= 29th Corps (People's Republic of China) =

29th Corps (1949–50) 29th Army Corps (1969–85)
- Active: February 1949 – November 1950, June 1969 – August 1985
- Country: (China)
- Part of: Fuzhou Military Region
- Garrison/HQ: Putian, Fujian
- Engagements: Chinese Civil War

The 29th Corps (Chinese: 第29军) was a military formation of the Chinese People's Liberation Army in 1949–50 and 1969–85.

== 1st Formation ==
The 29th Corps was activated in February 1949 from 11th Column, Huadong Field Army. The Corps was composed of the 85th Division, 86th Division and 87th Division.

The Corps took part in the Chinese Civil War, including the Battle of Kinmen.

In November 1950 the corps was inactivated and converted as Railway Public Security Command.

- 85th Division was transferred to Huadong Navy Command, later converted to Sailor Infantry Division;
- 86th Division was transferred to PLAAF and inactivated in 1951;
- 87th Division was transferred to Fujian Military Districts control, later converted to 13th Public Security Division.

== 2nd Formation ==
Following the Zhenbao Island Incident, 27th Army Corps and 28th Army Corps stationing in Fujian province moved to northern China to strengthen the defense of Beijing, which left a defense gap in Fujian area for the Republic of China Army. Therefore, in June 1969, 29th Army Corps (Chinese: 陆军第29军) was activated in Lianjiang, Fujian province.

As of its activation, the army corps was composed of:

- 85th Army Division;
- 86th Army Division;
- 87th Army Division.

In November 1969 the Army Corps HQ moved to Putian. The Army Corps Headquarters also took command of 92nd Army Division, 2nd Independent Division of Fujian Provincial Military District, 2nd and 3rd Garrison Division of Fuzhou Military Region.

In April 1975, 2nd Independent Division of Fujian Provincial Military District detached from the Army Corps. By then the army corps was composed of:

- 85th Army Division;
- 86th Army Division;
- 87th Army Division;
- 2nd Garrison Division of Fuzhou Military Region;
- 3rd Garrison Division of Fuzhou Military Region;
- Tank Regiment;
- Artillery Regiment;
- Anti-Aircraft Artillery Regiment.

In August 1985 the army corps was disbanded.

- 85th Army Division was disbanded;
- 86th Army Division was transferred to 31st Army as a southern motorized infantry division;
- 87th Army Division was disbanded.
