= Chu Qing =

Chinese politician

- 楚青
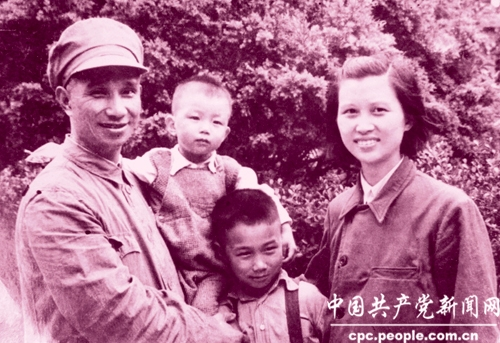
- Chu Qing with Su Yu and their sons in Shanghai, September 1949
- Born: Zhan Yongzhu; March 1923; Yangzhou, Jiangsu, China
- Died: 21 February 2016 (aged 92); Beijing, China
- Education: Provincial Yangzhou Middle School
- Occupations: Soldier, civil servant
- Political party: Chinese Communist Party
- Spouse: Su Yu (m. 1941; died 1984)
- Children: Su Rongsheng; Su Hansheng; Su Huining
- Relatives: Chen Xiaolu (son-in-law)

Chu Qing (Chinese: 楚青; pinyin: Chǔ Qīng, March 1923 – 21 February 2016), born Zhan Yongzhu, was a Chinese soldier and civil servant who served in the New Fourth Army during the Second Sino-Japanese War and the Chinese Civil War and later worked in the Ministry of Commerce. She was the wife of General Su Yu, and after his death she compiled and edited his memoirs and military writings.

== Early life and education ==
Chu was born Zhan Yongzhu in March 1923 in Yangzhou, Jiangsu. Her father, Zhan Keming, was a banker. After primary school, she entered the Provincial Yangzhou Middle School. After Yangzhou fell to Japanese forces in December 1937 during the Second Sino-Japanese War, her family fled to Shanghai, where she studied at the school's Shanghai branch class.

== New Fourth Army ==
In November 1938, Chu reached the headquarters of the New Fourth Army at Zhangjiadu in southern Anhui, where she joined the army's training corps and its headquarters shorthand training class. In March 1939, at the age of 16, she joined the Chinese Communist Party. In the spring of 1939, she met Su Yu, who was then a commander in the New Fourth Army. After completing the shorthand course, she was one of three women from her class of eight assigned to the army's Jiangnan Command, where Su Yu was deputy commander.

During the Second Sino-Japanese War and second-half of the Chinese Civil War, Chu worked as a stenographer, confidential secretary, secretary, staff officer and party branch secretary in units including the Jiangnan and Subei commands, the New Fourth Army's 1st Division, its headquarters at Huanghuatang, the party's Central China Bureau, the Jiangsu–Zhejiang Military Region, the Central China Military Region, the East China Field Army and the party committee of Jinan. She took part in anti-"mopping-up" operations in southern and central Jiangsu, the battle of Huangqiao, three campaigns against Nationalist forces at Tianmu Mountain and the central Jiangsu campaign. During the civil war, she was present at the battles of Suqian, southern Shandong, Laiwu and Menglianggu, and she crossed the Yangtze River three times.

== Civilian career ==
In 1952, Chu left the army and transferred to civilian work at the All-China Federation of Supply and Marketing Cooperatives and the Ministry of Commerce. She served there as a deputy section chief and section chief in the planning bureau, as deputy director of the bureau and as head of the ministry's policy research office. She later worked as a secretary at the Academy of Military Sciences. She retired as a cadre of deputy army rank in the General Office of the Central Military Commission.

In 1958, Su Yu was wrongly criticised at an enlarged meeting of the Central Military Commission, and Chu, who had not known of the matter beforehand, later helped him draft self-criticisms with which she disagreed. After Su Yu died in 1984, Chu and the family scattered his ashes at more than 20 places where he had fought. She campaigned for his rehabilitation and compiled or edited his writings, including Su Yu's War Memoirs, Su Yu on the Huaihai Campaign, The Collected Military Writings of Su Yu and Su Yu on the War of Resistance in Central Jiangsu.

== Personal life ==
Su Yu courted Chu for several years, and she initially turned him down, telling him that she did not want to think about personal matters while the country was at war. They married on 26 December 1941 at Shizhuang in Rudong County, Jiangsu, the headquarters of the New Fourth Army's 1st Division, when she was 18 and he was 34. They remained together for more than 40 years. After his death, she also wrote a lament for him and a poem about their life together.

Chu and Su Yu had two sons, Su Rongsheng and Su Hansheng, and a daughter, Su Huining. Su Rongsheng became a lieutenant general in the PLA, and Su Hansheng served in the navy. Su Huining married Chen Xiaolu, the son of Marshal Chen Yi.

Chu died in Beijing on 21 February 2016. Her farewell ceremony was held in Beijing on 25 February 2016, and Xi Jinping, Yu Zhengsheng, Liu Yandong, Fan Changlong and Xu Qiliang sent wreaths. Children of other revolutionary leaders, including Liu Yuan, Zhu Heping and Xi Yuanping, attended the ceremony.
