= 12th Coastal Defense Division =

87th Division (1949–52) 13th Public Security Division (1952–57) 13th Garrison Division (1957-69) 2nd Garrison Division of Fuzhou Military Region (1969-85) 12th Garrison Division of Nanjing Military Region (1985-92) 12th Coastal Defense Division (1992-2017) 303rd Coastal Defense Brigade (2017-)
- Active: 1949.2 -
- Country: China
- Allegiance: Chinese Communist Party
- Branch: People's Liberation Army Ground Force
- Type: Infantry
- Size: Brigade
- Part of: Fujian Provincial Military District
- Garrison/HQ: Changle, Fujian
- Engagements: Chinese Civil War

Commanders
- Notable commanders: Xu Jiatun

The 87th Division (Chinese: 第87师) was created in February 1949 under the Regulation of the Redesignations of All Organizations and Units of the Army, issued by Central Military Commission on November 1, 1948, basing on the 33rd Brigade, 11th Column of the Huadong Field Army, which was activated in April 1948.

The division was part of the 29th Corps. Under the flag of the 87th Division, it was engaged in several battles in the Chinese Civil War, including the Shanghai Campaign.

The division was then composed of:

- 259th Regiment
- 260th Regiment
- 261st Regiment

In October 1950 the division was transferred to Fujian Military Region's control with the disbandment of the 29th Corps.

In July 1952, the division was reconstituted as the 13th Public Security Division(Chinese: 公安第13师). The division was mainly tasked with the defense of Pingtan Island and Nanri Island in Fujian. The division was under the control of Public Security Troops Command, Huadong Military Region.

The division was then composed of:

- 37th Public Security Regiment
- 38th Public Security Regiment
- 39th Public Security Regiment

In June 1956, the division was reconstituted into a garrison formation. In February 1957 the division was reorganized as the 13th Garrison Division(Chinese: 守备第13师).

In November 1969, the division was renamed as 2nd Garrison Division of Fuzhou Military Region(Chinese: 福州军区守备第2师).

In September 1985, following the disbandment of Fuzhou Military Region, the division was redesignated as 12th Garrison Division of Nanjing Military Region(Chinese: 南京军区守备第12师).

In 1992, the division was reconstituted as 12th Coastal Defense Division(Chinese: 海防第12师). The division was then composed of:

- 45th Coastal Defense Regiment - former 261st
- 45th Coastal Defense Regiment - former 259th
- 45th Coastal Defense Regiment - former 260th

In April 2017 the division was reduced as the 303rd Coastal Defense Brigade(Chinese: 海防第303旅). It is now serving as a coastal defense formation of the Eastern Theatre Command Ground Forces.
