= 92nd Motorized Infantry Brigade =

92nd Division (1949–53) 92nd Infantry Division (1953–60) 92nd Army Division (1960-85) 92nd Infantry Division (1985-98) 92nd Motorized Infantry Brigade (1998-2017) 92nd Combined Arms Brigade (2017-)
- Active: 1949.2 -
- Country: People's Republic of China
- Branch: People's Liberation Army Ground Force
- Type: Motorized Infantry
- Size: Brigade
- Part of: 73rd Group Army
- Garrison/HQ: Quanzhou, Fujian
- Engagements: Chinese Civil War

The 92nd Division (Chinese: 第92师) was created in February 1949 under the Regulation of the Redesignations of All Organizations and Units of the Army, issued by Central Military Commission on November 1, 1948, basing on the 38th Division, 13th Column of the Huadong Field Army. Its history can be traced to the New 6th Division, Jiaodong Military District, formed in March 1947.

The division was part of the 31st Corps. Under the flag of the 92nd Division, it was engaged in several major battles in the Chinese Civil War, including the Huaihai Campaign and Shanghai Campaign.

In July 1950, Artillery Regiment, 92nd Division was activated, which was later renamed as 372nd Artillery Regiment in 1953.

In April 1960 the division was renamed as 92nd Army Division (Chinese: 陆军第92师). It was then composed of:

- 274th Regiment
- 275th Regiment
- 276th Regiment
- 372nd Artillery Regiment

In June 1969, 372nd Artillery Regiment was renamed as Artillery Regiment, 92nd Army Division.

From November 1969 to April 1975, the division was temporarily transferred to under 29th Army Corps' control and garrisoned in Nan'an, Fujian. In April 1975 the division was attached to the 31st Army Corps again and moved to Quanzhou, Fujian.

In 1985, the division was renamed as 92nd Infantry Division(Chinese: 步兵第92师) and reconstituted as a southern infantry division, category B:

- 276th Regiment was disbanded;
- 261st Regiment was attached from the disbanding 87th Army Division.

The division was then composed of:

- 274th Regiment
- 275th Regiment
- 261st Regiment
- Artillery Regiment

In November 1998 the division was reduced and reconstituted as 92nd Motorized Infantry Brigade(Chinese: 摩托化步兵第92旅).

In 2017 the brigade was reconstituted as 92nd Light Combined Arms Brigade(Chinese: 轻型合成第92旅). It is now a maneuvering part of PLA 73rd Group Army
