= 83rd Infantry Division (People's Republic of China) =

83rd Division (1949–53) 83rd Infantry Division (1953–60) 83rd Army Division (1960-85) 83rd Infantry Division (1985-98) 83rd Reserve Infantry Division (1998-)
- Active: 1949.2 -
- Country: People's Republic of China
- Branch: People's Liberation Army Ground Force
- Type: Infantry
- Size: Division
- Part of: Shanxi Provincial Military District
- Garrison/HQ: Yuncheng, Shanxi
- Engagements: Chinese Civil War

The 83rd Division (Chinese: 第83师) was created in February 1949 under the Regulation of the Redesignations of All Organizations and Units of the Army, issued by Central Military Commission on November 1, 1948, basing on the 29th Division, 10th Column of the Huadong Field Army. Its history can be traced to the 11th Division, Shandong Military Region, formed in November 1946.

The division was part of the 28th Corps. Under the flag of the 83rd Division, it was engaged in several major battles in the Chinese Civil War, including the Menglianggu Campaign, Laiwu Campaign, Jinan Campaign, Huaihai Campaign and Shanghai Campaign.

In July 1950, Artillery Regiment, 83rd Division was activated, which was later renamed as 363rd Artillery Regiment in 1953.

In October 1952, 249th Regiment, 83rd Division was decimated in the Battle of Nanri Island.

In 1958 the division took part in the shelling of Kinmen Islands.

In April 1960 the division was renamed as 83rd Army Division (Chinese: 陆军第83师). It was then composed of:

- 247th Regiment
- 248th Regiment
- 249th Regiment
- 363rd Artillery Regiment

In November 1969, the division was redeployed to Yuncheng, Shanxi along with the 28th Army Corps. In December 363rd Artillery Regiment was renamed as Artillery Regiment, 83rd Army Division.

In August 1985 the division was reconstituted as a northern infantry division, category B and renamed as 82nd Infantry Division (Chinese: 步兵第82师). The division was then composed of:

- 247th Infantry Regiment
- 248th Infantry Regiment
- 249th Infantry Regiment
- Artillery Regiment

In 1998, the division was transferred to Shanxi Provincial Military District's control and reorganized as 83rd Reserve Infantry Division of Shanxi Provincial Military District(Chinese: 山西省军区预备役步兵第83师). By then the division was composed of:

- 247th Infantry Regiment
- 248th Infantry Regiment
- Tank Regiment - converted from the 249th Infantry Regiment
- Artillery Regiment
- Anti-Aircraft Artillery Regiment

In November 2004, the division merged with the Reserve Infantry Division of Shanxi Provincial Military District, during which it reconstituted its 249th Regiment and Artillery Regiment.

Since then the division was composed of:

- 247th Infantry Regiment
- 248th Infantry Regiment
- 249th Infantry Regiment
- Tank Regiment
- Artillery Regiment
- Anti-Aircraft Artillery Regiment

The division is now a reserve unit under the control of the Shanxi Provincial Military District
