= 2nd Garrison Division of Nanjing Military Region =

85th Division (1949–52) Sailor Infantry Division (1952–54) Marine Division (1954–57) 11th Garrison Division (1957-60) 2nd Security Division (1960–70) 2nd Garrison Division of Nanjing Military Region (1970–85)
- Active: 1949.2 - 1985
- Country: People's Republic of China
- Branch: People's Liberation Army
- Type: Division
- Role: Infantry, Marines, Garrison
- Part of: 29th Corps
- Engagements: Chinese Civil War

The 85th Division (Chinese: 第85师) was created in February 1949 under the Regulation of the Redesignations of All Organizations and Units of the Army, issued by Central Military Commission on November 1, 1948, basing on the 31st Brigade, 11th Column of Huadong Field Army. Its history could be traced to 31st Brigade, 7th Column of Huazhong Field Army formed in September 1946.

Under the flag of 29th Corps it took part in the Chinese Civil War. Its 253rd Regiment suffered heavy loss in the battle of Kinmen.

The division was transferred to Fuzhou Military Region's control after the disbandment of 29th Corps in October 1950.

In May 1952 the division was reorganized and renamed as Sailor Infantry Division (Chinese: 水兵师) or Seaman Division. Maritime historian David G Muller identified this move as part of the People's Republic of China's ambitions to capture Taiwan by amphibious assault. In December 1954 the division was further converted to Marine Division (Chinese: 海军陆战师), being the first division of People's Liberation Army Marine Corps.

In February 1955, Amphibious Training Tank Regiment of the Huadong Navy (former 51st Amphibious Tank Regiment of 26th Tank Division) was attached to the division.

In August 1957 the division was re-organized and renamed as 11th Garrison Division (Chinese: 守备第11师). The division station at Pinghu, Zhejiang.

In June 1960 the division absorbed 14th Border Defense Regiment, moved to Shanghai Security District and renamed as 2nd Security Division (Chinese: 警备第2师). Its Amphibious Tank Regiment was detached. The division was then composed of:

- 68th Garrison Regiment;
- 69th Garrison Regiment;
- Artillery Regiment;
- Amphibious Tank Regiment.

In 1970 it became as 2nd Garrison Division of Nanjing Military Region (Chinese: 南京军区守备第2师).

In 1985 the division was disbanded.
