= Su Yu =

Chinese military commander, general of the People's Liberation Army

Senior General Su Yu
- 粟裕
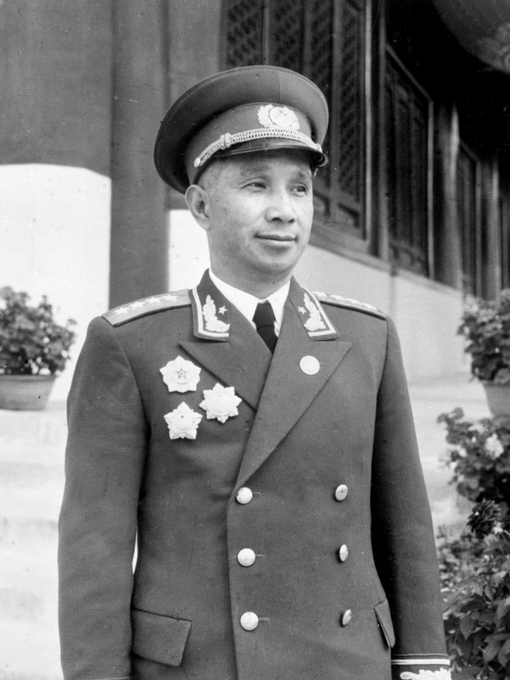
- Su Yu in his Senior General uniform (1955)

Personal details
- Born: August 10, 1907 Huitong, Hunan, Qing China
- Died: February 5, 1984 (aged 76) Beijing, China
- Party: Chinese Communist Party
- Nickname(s): "The Zhukov of China" (中国的朱可夫); 502 (military call sign)

Military service
- Allegiance: China
- Branch/service: People's Liberation Army Ground Force
- Years of service: 1927–1984
- Rank: Senior General of the People's Liberation Army
- Commands: Deputy Commander, PLA Eastern China Field Army; Chief of the General Staff, PLA General Staff Department
- Battles/wars: Northern Expedition; Chinese Civil War; Second Sino-Japanese War

Su Yu (Chinese: 粟裕; pinyin: Sù Yù; August 10, 1907 – February 5, 1984), courtesy name Yu (裕), was a Chinese general of the People's Liberation Army (PLA). He was one of the most prominent Communist commanders during the Chinese Civil War and the Second Sino-Japanese War, and was regarded as one of the PLA's most capable operational commanders. He served as deputy commander and principal operational planner of the East China Field Army under Chen Yi, playing a leading role in several major Communist victories. Su participated in the campaigns of the Chinese Red Army during the 1930s and served with the New Fourth Army during the Second Sino-Japanese War. During the Chinese Civil War, he played a central role in the Menglianggu campaign, the Huaihai campaign, the Yangtze River Crossing campaign, and the Shanghai Campaign. His planning and command contributed significantly to the destruction of major Kuomintang forces in eastern China and the Communist victory in the civil war.

After the establishment of the People's Republic of China in 1949, Su Yu held several senior military positions, including Chief of the General Staff from 1954 to 1958 and vice minister of national defense. He was awarded the rank of general in 1955 and later served in senior positions in the Academy of Military Science, where he contributed to the study and modernization of the PLA.

== Early life ==
Su Yu was born on 10 August 1907 in Fengmushujiao Village in Fulong Township, Huitong County, Hunan Province, to an ethnic Dong family. He was the third child among six siblings. Su's father was Su Zhouheng (粟周亨) and his mother was Liang Manmei (梁满妹). He began his education at a traditional private school in 1913, where he studied classical texts such as the Three Character Classic, Hundred Family Surnames, Doctrine of the Mean and Classic of Poetry. In 1918, banditry in rural Huitong forced his family to move to the county seat. Su Yu continued his education at the local Model Primary School and later at a higher primary school. Although he performed well academically, his father required him to manage the family accounts, which disrupted his studies and resulted in him repeating grades.

As a student, Su was influenced by growing opposition to the Beiyang warlord forces stationed in the area. In January 1924, he left home and moved to Changde, where he continued his education. In the spring of 1925, he was admitted to Hunan Provincial Second Normal School in Changde. There, he joined the Students' Association, which was associated with the Chinese Communist movement. During the Northern Expedition, he and other students secretly circulated communist literature and helped raise funds to acquire weapons and ammunition in support of the advancing National Revolutionary Army. In 1926, Su participated in student protests against the expulsion of Teng Daiyuan, an incident that became known as the "Second Normal School Incident". He joined the Chinese Communist Youth League in November 1926 and became a member of the Chinese Communist Party the following year.

== Chinese Civil War (1927–1937) ==
In 1927, following the April 12 incident, Su was transferred to Wuchang and assigned to the training unit of the 24th Division under Ye Ting. He received military training and later became a squad leader in the unit’s guard force. He participated in the Nanchang Uprising on 1 August 1927 and subsequently accompanied the communist forces southward. He took part in several battles in Jiangxi and Guangdong before joining Zhu De’s forces in southern Hunan, where he served as a company political instructor and participated in the Xiangnan Uprising and local land reform.

In April 1928, Su reached Jinggangshan, where Zhu De’s forces joined Mao Zedong’s troops to form the Fourth Army of the Chinese Red Army. He subsequently held several company-level command and political positions. In 1929, he was tasked with protecting Mao while he conducted political investigations in western Fujian. By 1930, Su had risen to command a detachment of the 12th Red Army and participated in military operations against Nationalist forces, including the second attempt to capture Changsha. From 1930, he held increasingly senior command positions in the Red Army. He served as commander of the 64th Division during the First and Second Encirclement Campaigns and participated in the Third Encirclement Campaign. In 1931, he became chief of staff of the Fourth Army and later commanded the Red Army’s Training Division.

In 1933, Su Yu was appointed chief of staff of the 11th Red Army. He was seriously wounded in the left arm during the Battle of Xiaoshi in Jiangxi that year, leaving his left arm permanently disabled. In 1934, he became chief of staff of the Red 10th Army Corps. Following its defeat at Huaiyu Mountain, Su led a small force to break through the encirclement and subsequently conducted guerrilla warfare in southwestern Zhejiang. In January 1935, he became commander of the newly formed Vanguard Division, which established a guerrilla base in the region.

== Second Sino-Japanese War ==
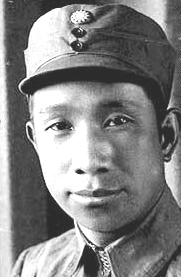
Su as deputy commander of the Second Detachment of the New Fourth Army in the early stages of the Second Sino-Japanese War

After the outbreak of the Second Sino-Japanese War in 1937, Su joined the New Fourth Army and became deputy commander of its Second Detachment. He led a successful ambush against Japanese forces in southern Jiangsu during the Battle of Weigang in June 1938, which became his first victory against the Japanese. In 1939, he continued to command successful ambushes at Japanese forces in Shuiyang, Hengshan, Guandoumen and Litouqiao.

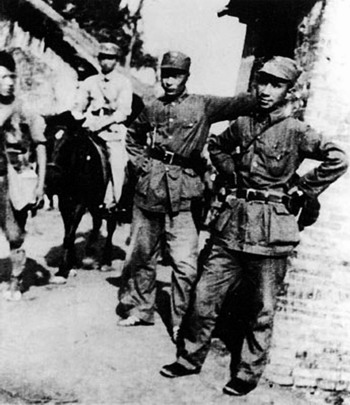
Chen Yi and Su Yu on the eve of the Battle of Huangqiao

In 1940, he moved his forces into northern Jiangsu and helped establish the Subei (Northern Jiangsu) anti-Japanese base area in Jiangsu. He commanded the Battle of Huangqiao in October, defeating a major Nationalist force and strengthening the New Fourth Army's position in the region. In March 1944, Su oversaw the Battle of Cheqiao, a major victory against Japanese and collaborationist forces. The battle strengthened Communist control in central Jiangsu and was followed by a series of further offensives that reportedly eliminated more than 50,000 Japanese and collaborationist troops and captured or forced the abandonment of more than 60 strongpoints

In December 1944, Su led the main force of the New Fourth Army’s 1st Division across the Yangtze River and became commander and political commissar of the Su-Zhe (Jiangsu-Zhejiang) Military Region, later also serving as secretary of the Su-Zhe Regional Party Committee. He consolidated the Communist anti-Japanese bases in southern Jiangsu and eastern Zhejiang, and established a new base in western Zhejiang. From March to June 1945, New Fourth Army forces fought three engagements against Nationalist forces in the Tianmu Mountain region of western Zhejiang, particularly around Xiaofeng (present-day Anji County). All three ended in victories for the New Fourth Army. The campaigns demonstrated Su’s ability to transition from guerrilla warfare to large-scale conventional operations and were regarded by the Communist leadership as an important example of field command. Mao Zedong reportedly praised Su Yu’s military ability, predicting that he could eventually command an army of 400,000–500,000 troops.

== Chinese Civil War (1945–1949) ==
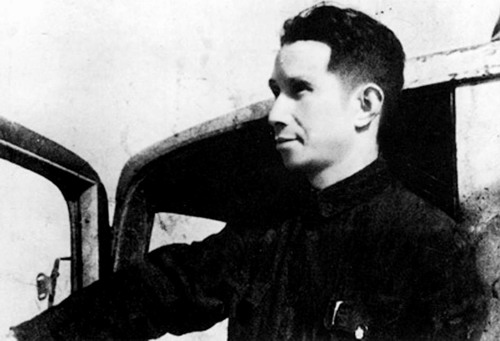
Su Yu in Battle of Suzhong (Central Jiangsu)

After Japan's surrender in August 1945, Su Yu anticipated that renewed conflict between the Kuomintang and the Chinese Communist Party was likely. He argued that Communist forces should withdraw from southern Jiangsu and establish new bases farther north. In October, he led more than 65,000 troops from the Su-Zhe Military Region across the Yangtze River into central Jiangsu. He subsequently became commander of the Central Jiangsu Military Region and helped reorganize the Central China Field Army.

After negotiations between the Kuomintang and Communist Party broke down, Su advocated fighting the Nationalist forces within the Communist-controlled areas of central Jiangsu. From July to August 1946, he commanded the Central Jiangsu Campaign, consisting of seven major engagements. The campaign resulted in more than 53,000 Nationalist casualties or captures and became known as the "Seven Victories in Seven Battles of Central Jiangsu." In December 1946, he commanded Communist forces in the Battle of Northern Jiangsu, destroying the headquarters and most of three and a half brigades of the Nationalist 69th Division. In January 1947, he commanded the Lunan Campaign in southern Shandong, in which Communist forces defeated several Nationalist formations, including the 26th Division and First Rapid Column. More than 53,000 Nationalist troops were reported killed or captured, along with large quantities of equipment, including 24 tanks and 217 artillery pieces.

As deputy commander of the newly established East China Field Army, Su planned and directed the Battle of Laiwu in February 1947. Communist forces surrounded and destroyed the main body of the Nationalist formation commanded by Li Xianzhou, with more than 60,000 troops reported eliminated or captured. The victory further strengthened Communist control of Shandong. In May 1947, Su commanded the East China Field Army during the Battle of Menglianggu. Using maneuver and deception, Communist forces isolated the Nationalist 74th Division, one of the Nationalist Army's elite formations. The division was destroyed after being surrounded at Menglianggu, with its commander Zhang Lingfu killed. The battle became one of the best-known Communist victories of the Chinese Civil War.

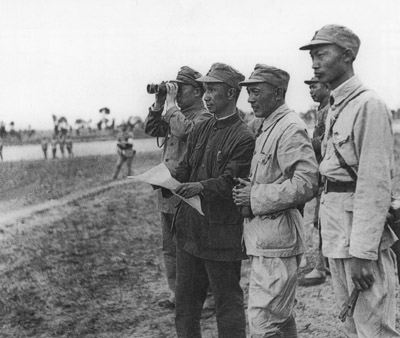
Su Yu, holding map and wearing dark uniform, surveying the battlefield before the Menglianggu Campaign in 1947.

After the East China Field Army shifted to operations outside its main base areas in July 1947, Su commanded the forces that launched the Battle of Shatuji in Shandong on September, inflicting a major defeat on the Nationalist 57th Division and helping reverse the unfavorable situation in the East China theater. In June 1948, he redirected his forces toward Kaifeng after abandoning an earlier plan to attack the Nationalist 5th Army. Communist forces captured Kaifeng on June 22 after several days of fighting and subsequently defeated the Nationalist forces sent to relieve the city. The wider Eastern Henan Campaign lasted about 20 days and resulted in more than 50,000 Nationalist casualties, deaths or surrenders. In September 1948, Su directed the East China Field Army's operations during the Battle of Jinan, coordinating both the assault on the city and efforts to block Nationalist reinforcements. Communist forces captured Jinan after eight days of fighting, while more than 60,000 Nationalist troops were reported killed or captured. The victory demonstrated the People's Liberation Army's growing ability to capture heavily defended cities and preceded the major campaigns that brought the civil war toward its conclusion.

Following the capture of Jinan, Su Yu proposed a major campaign in the Huaihai region. His strategic proposals contributed to the formation and unified command of the Huaihai Campaign, which became one of the decisive campaigns of the Chinese Civil War. It was at his suggestion on January 22, 1948, that the two armies of Liu Bocheng and Su followed a sudden-concentrate, sudden-disperse strategy that led to this decisive victory in late 1948. The campaign lasted from November 1948 to January 1949. Communist forces destroyed or induced the surrender of approximately 555,000 Nationalist troops. Su's East China Field Army accounted for about 440,000 of these casualties or captures and also provided forces that helped encircle Huang Wei's army. Mao Zedong subsequently praised Su as having made the most important contribution to the Huaihai Campaign.

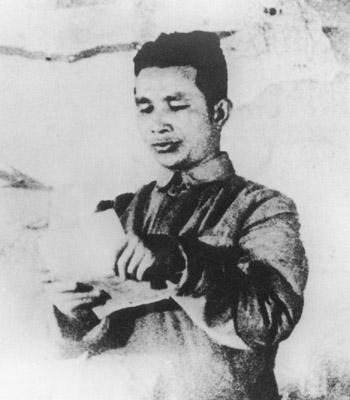
Su announces the order for the Yangtze River Crossing Operation to the Third Field Army (1949))

In January 1949, the East China Field Army was reorganized as the Third Field Army, with Su appointed deputy commander. During the Yangtze Crossing Campaign in April, he and Zhang Zhen commanded the eastern group of approximately 350,000 troops. Communist forces crossed the Yangtze on April 21 and entered Nanjing two days later. Su subsequently directed the Shanghai Campaign. Approximately 420,000 Communist troops surrounded the city using coordinated attacks from several directions. Shanghai fell on 27 May 1949 and on the same day, Su took office as the deputy director of the newly established Shanghai Military Control Commission of the People's Liberation Army. On 29 May 1949, the People's Liberation Army captured Xikou and Fenghua, the birthplace of Chiang Kai-shek. The next day, it captured Chongming Island, marking the final major Communist victory in eastern China.

Following the capture of Shanghai, Su Yu participated in planning further operations in southeastern China and preparations for a possible campaign against Taiwan. He chaired a June 1949 meeting on the military occupation of Fujian and the capture of coastal islands, while the Communist leadership also instructed him to study preparations for an operation against Taiwan.

== After the establishment of the PRC ==
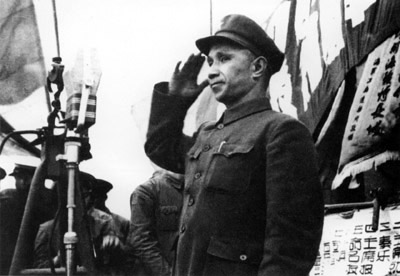
Su Yu delivering speech at the first anniversary celebration of the founding of the East Sea Fleet of the People's Liberation Army Navy (1950)

After the establishment of the People's Republic of China on 1 October 1949, Su attended the founding ceremony in Beijing and was appointed a member of the Central People's Government's People's Revolutionary Military Commission later that month. He returned to Nanjing in October and continued to oversee military operations in eastern China, including preparations for the capture of the Zhoushan Islands. He was also appointed director of the committee responsible for planning the campaign to capture Taiwan and made several reports to Mao Zedong and Zhou Enlai on the proposed operation. The plan was subsequently postponed following the Communist defeat at the Battle of Guningtou in 1949 and outbreak of the Korean War in 1950 led to its indefinite suspension. In July 1950, Su was appointed commander and political commissar of the Northeast Border Defense Army, which was being prepared for possible deployment to Korea. However, a recurrence of hypertension, gastrointestinal illness and Ménière's disease prevented him from assuming the post and in the end, Peng Dehuai was selected. After treatment in Qingdao and later the Soviet Union, he returned to China in 1951 and became deputy chief of the General Staff and deputy commander of the East China Military Region.

From 1952, Su served as acting head of the General Staff Department during Nie Rongzhen's absence for medical treatment. He was formally appointed Chief of the People's Liberation Army General Staff Department in November 1954. In this position, he played an important role in the modernization and reorganization of the armed forces, including the development of different military branches, the strengthening of the navy and air force, and the reorganization of military regions. He was made a da jiang (Grand General) in 1955, one of ten men to receive this second-highest rank.

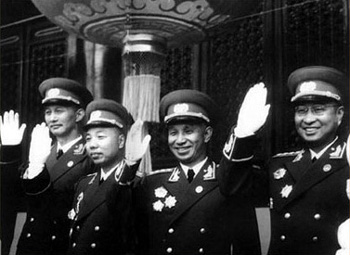
Hong Xuezhi, Xiao Hua, Su Yu, and Chen Geng wearing their new Type 55 dress uniforms in 1955 (left to right)

In April 1957, he was sent by the central leadership to Sichuan to assess the suppression of armed unrest in ethnic minority areas and advise on military preparations for the implementation of democratic reforms. He visited Chengdu, Ya'an, Xichang, Liangshan and other areas, emphasizing coordination between the party, government, military and civilian authorities and the importance of political and mass work. He subsequently organized meetings with military commanders from several regions to exchange experience and coordinate operations. In 1958, Su was subjected to criticism during an enlarged Central Military Commission meeting and was accused of "bourgeois individualism" and dogmatism. He was removed as Chief of the General Staff and appointed Vice Minister of National Defense and deputy director of the Academy of Military Sciences, where he subsequently took responsibility for much of its day-to-day work. Despite the criticism, Su continued to hold senior positions and remained involved in military affairs. During the 1959 Lushan Conference, he declined to use the political campaign against Peng Dehuai as an opportunity to raise his own case.

During the Cultural Revolution, Su was brought into the State Council's work in 1967 to help stabilize the country's defense-industrial sector. He became head of the military administration group overseeing the defense industries and participated in the State Council's work, with responsibilities covering railways, transport, telecommunications, ports, shipbuilding and defense production. He travelled extensively to inspect major ports and worked to maintain the functioning of the defense-industrial system amid political upheaval. He also intervened on several occasions to protect military and civilian officials from persecution and provided testimony affirming the historical records of those who had been investigated. Su continued to contribute to national defense planning during the late 1960s and 1970s. He advised on the development of advanced military technology, modernization of the defense industries and preparations for a possible conflict with the Soviet Union. In 1972, he became First Political Commissar of the Academy of Military Sciences and its Party Committee First Secretary, where he promoted the study and development of Mao Zedong's military thought and military dialectics.

In 1975, Su was appointed a member of the Standing Committee of the Fourth National People's Congress. He conducted extensive inspections of military units across China and reported on the stability and organization of the armed forces. He also submitted recommendations concerning the defense of Hainan Island and continued to resist political interference in military affairs during the final years of the Cultural Revolution. Following the end of the Cultural Revolution, he participated in the rehabilitation of officials who had been persecuted during the political campaigns. In 1978, he represented the Academy of Military Sciences' Party Committee in formally correcting the cases of several wrongly persecuted officials.

In January 1979, Su Yu delivered reports on methods of warfare during the initial stages of a future conflict. His analysis attracted considerable international attention; Australian defense intelligence official Paul Dibb later described him as one of China's principal strategic voices. Later that year, Su Yu visited Japan as senior adviser to the "China-Japan Friendship" ship delegation, which sailed to Japanese cities such as Tokyo, Nagoya, Osaka, Nagasaki, etc. In 1980, he was elected Vice Chairman of the Standing Committee of the National People's Congress. Su also sought formal rehabilitation for the criticism he had received in 1958. In October 1979, he submitted an appeal to the Central Committee requesting that the accusations against him be withdrawn. Although efforts to address the case continued during the following years, a formal resolution was not reached during his lifetime. In his later years, he published The Memoirs of Su Yu (粟裕回忆录).

In 1980, China adopted a new Military Strategic Guideline that envisioned using a combined arms approach and positional warfare to defend against a potential invasion by the Soviet Union. In Su's analysis, positional defenses would be beneficial because the Soviet Union would be disinclined to use tactical nuclear weapons for fear of destroying spoils of war and making itself unable to use captured cities as forward bases. Su also contended that the Soviet Union would view the use of nuclear weapons as extremely costly, because "we also have nuclear weapons, if you attack we attack, there is danger that all will suffer great losses, so it cannot but have some hesitation." Su also expected that once nuclear weapons were used, escalation would be impossible to avoid, because "it is very hard for any limits to exist, so tactical scale could develop into strategic scale" use.

Su Yu died in Beijing on 5 February 1984, aged 77. In accordance with his wishes, no funeral ceremony was held and his ashes were scattered in several provinces and cities where he had fought during his military career. In 1987, the Chinese military encyclopedia formally described the 1958 criticism of Su Yu as erroneous. In December 1994, the Central Military Commission officially acknowledged that he had been wrongly criticized in 1958 and described the episode as a historical error. This formally concluded the long-running case against him.

== Family ==
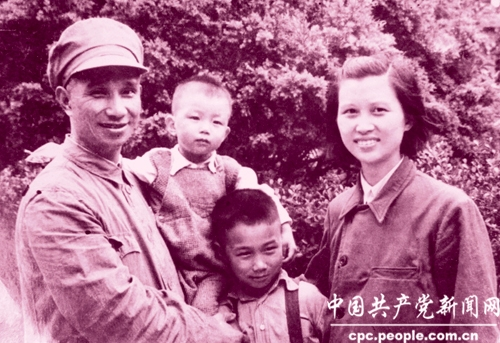
Su Yu, Chu Qing, and their two sons Su Rongsheng and Su Hansheng in Shanghai, September 1949

Su Yu identified himself as Han Chinese throughout his lifetime and continued to do so until his death in 1984. During the 1951 National Day celebrations, Mao Zedong asked him whether he was from an ethnic minority and whether he was Miao. Su replied that he was Han Chinese. In 1986, two years after Su’s death, the county government of Huitong County investigated the ethnic origins of the Su clan following requests from local Dong residents. The investigation concluded that the Su clan were descendants of Dong people who had migrated from Tongdao County in Hunan. As a result, the Dong ethnic identity of the Su clan, including Su Yu’s family, was officially restored.

Su Yu married Chu Qing (楚青) in February 1941. They had three children, all of whom joined the PLA. The eldest son Su Rongsheng (粟戎生) was born in 1942, followed by the second son Su Hansheng (粟寒生), and the youngest, a daughter Su Huining (粟惠宁), who married Chen Xiaolu (陈小鲁) in August 1975. Chen Xiaolu was the youngest son of Chen Yi who was Su Yu's direct superior during wartime. According to Su Rongsheng, Su Yu was an extremely strict father. When Su Rongsheng was only three years old, Su Yu forced him to learn how to swim by giving him only a piece of bamboo as a float, and pushed him into the water in front of his mother, and prohibited anyone from attempting to save Su Rongsheng. Su Yu's wife, Chu Qing was outraged and asked Su Yu angrily whether he was not worried about Su Rongsheng being drowned. But Su Yu answered that Su Rongsheng would have never learned how to swim any other way and besides, he was not being drowned. Aged 20, Su Rongsheng joined the PLA and remained in service for 45 years, rising from an ordinary soldier to a lieutenant general when he retired as the deputy commander-in-chief of Beijing Military District at age 65.

== Awards and honors ==
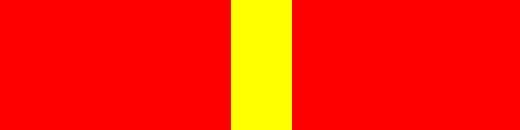
Order of August 1 (1st Class Medal) (1955)
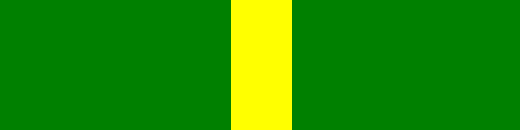
Order of Independence and Freedom (1st Class Medal) (1955)
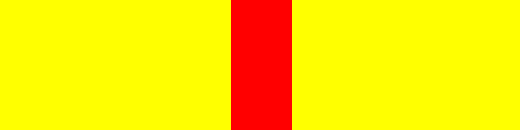
Order of Liberation (1st Class Medal) (1955)

== See also ==
- List of officers of the People's Liberation Army

Military offices
Preceded by Marshal Nie Rongzhen	PLA Chief of the General Staff; 1954–1958	Succeeded by Senior General Huang Kecheng
