= Demokrat Leonov =

Soviet Border Troops colonel (1926–1969)

Demokrat Vladimirovich Leonov
- Born: 1 April 1926; Baku, Azerbaijan SSR, Soviet Union
- Died: 15 March 1969 (aged 42); Damansky Island, Russian SFSR, Soviet Union
- Military career
- Allegiance: Soviet Union
- Branch: Soviet Border Troops
- Service years: 1943–1969
- Rank: Colonel
- Conflicts: World War II; Sino-Soviet border conflict †
- Awards: Hero of the Soviet Union; Order of Lenin

Demokrat Vladimirovich Leonov (Russian: Демократ Владимирович Леонов; 1 April 1926 – 15 March 1969) was a Soviet Border Troops colonel and a Hero of the Soviet Union, who was killed in action during the 1969 Sino-Soviet border conflict.

== Biography ==
Leonov was born on 1 April 1926 in Baku. His father served as a Border Guard.

After finishing 9th grade of school in 1943, Leonov began serving as a member of the Soviet Border Troops, when the Second World War was ongoing. He did not see any front line combat during the war. In 1947, he joined the Communist Party of Soviet Union and graduated from the Military Institute of the Ministry of Internal Affairs in 1954. Upon graduation, he was assigned to the South Caucasus region, and four years later he became chief of staff of the border detachment at the Transcaucasian Military District.

In 1968, Leonov was transferred to the city of Iman in Primorsky Krai, where he received the administrative position of chief of the 57th Border Detachment.

In March 1969, hostilities between China and Soviet Union erupted in the vicinity of Damansky Island on the Ussuri (Wusuli) River, near Manchuria. On 15 March Leonov led a group of three T-62 tanks of the 135th Motorized Rifle Division to provide support to an army unit against the People's Liberation Army units. However, his tank was disabled by a PLA grenade launcher, injuring him. Leonov was killed after being shot directly in the heart by a Chinese sniper as he was leaving his disabled tank. The conflict ended on 11 September 1969 with a ceasefire and a return to the status quo.

Leonov was buried with military honors at a memorial in the city of Iman (currently known as Dalnerechensk), where frontier-guards who died during the Sino-Soviet border conflict on Damansky Island are buried.

== Awards and honors ==
Hero of the Soviet Union (By the decree of the Presidium of the Supreme Soviet of the USSR of 21 March 1969, posthumously)
Order of Lenin (21 March 1969, posthumously)
Medal "For Battle Merit"
Medal "For Distinction in Guarding the State Border of the USSR"
Medal "For the Victory over Germany in the Great Patriotic War 1941–1945" (1945)
Jubilee Medal "Twenty Years of Victory in the Great Patriotic War 1941–1945" (1965)
Jubilee Medal "30 Years of the Soviet Army and Navy" (1948)
Jubilee Medal "40 Years of the Armed Forces of the USSR" (1958)
Jubilee Medal "50 Years of the Armed Forces of the USSR" (1968)
Medal "For Impeccable Service", 1st class
Medal "For Impeccable Service", 2nd class

- Honorary State Security Officer

A street in Vladivostok is named after Leonov. A factory ship based at Petropavlovsk-Kamchatsky was also named in honor of him. A secondary school in the city of Magadan bore the name of Leonov, and a memorial plaque in honor of him was installed at a secondary school in the city of Arkhangelsk.
