= Fang Kaitai =

Chinese mathematician and statistician (born 1940)

- Born: 1940 (age 85–86); Taizhou, Jiangsu, China
- Education: Peking University
- Known for: Elliptical distributions Generalized multivariate analysis Uniform experimental designs
- Awards: Elected Member of the ISI; Fellow of the IMS, HKSS, and ASA; President's Award for Outstanding Performance in Scholarly Work, HKBU; most excellent book in China (Government Information and Publication Administration).
- Scientific career
- Fields: Mathematics; Statistics
- Workplaces: Hong Kong Baptist University, Chinese Academy of Sciences
- Doctoral advisor: Pao-Lu Hsu
- Other academic advisors: Minyi Yue
- Notable students: A. M. Elsawah, Chen Hang-feng, Fan Jianqing, Quan Hui, Wu Yue-hua, Xu Jing-Iun, Zhang Hong-qing

Chinese name
- Traditional Chinese: 方開泰
- Simplified Chinese: 方开泰
Transcriptions
Standard Mandarin
- Hanyu Pinyin: Fāng Kāitài
- Wade–Giles: Fang^{1} K'ai^{1}-t'ai^{4}

Fang Kaitai (Chinese: 方开泰; born 1940), also known as Kai-Tai Fang, is a Chinese mathematician and statistician who has helped to develop generalized multivariate analysis, which extends classical multivariate analysis beyond the multivariate normal distribution to more general elliptical distributions. He has also contributed to the design of experiments.

== Selected university offices and honors ==
Fang is Director of Institute of Statistics and Computational Intelligence and Emeritus Professor at Hong Kong Baptist University, after having been Full Professor of the Institute of Applied Mathematics of the Chinese Academy of Sciences. He is an Elected Fellow (or Elected Member) of the Institute of Mathematical Statistics, of the International Statistical Institute (ISI), of the American Statistical Association (ASA), and of the Hong Kong Statistical Society (HKSS). The Hong Kong Baptist University honored Professor Fang with the President's Award for Outstanding Performance in Scholarly Work in 2001. Fang and Zhang's book Generalized multivariate analysis was honored as a "most excellent book in China" by the Government Information and Publication Administration.

== Biography ==
Fang's early life is described by Agnes Loie in a volume published on his 65th birthday. Fang was born in 1940 in Taizhou in the province of Jiangsu in China. He graduated from Jiangsu's Yangzhou High School.

=== University studies and the Cultural Revolution ===
In 1957 he studied mathematics at Peking University, after which he entered the graduate program at the Institute of Mathematics of the Chinese Academy of Sciences, in Beijing. His doctoral supervisor was Pao-Lu Hsu, who suggested that Fang provide a multivariate generalization and correction of a univariate result, which had been given an incomplete proof in a Russian paper. With two weeks' work, Fang's submitted his extensions, which were declared by Hsu to suffice for his dissertation. Unfortunately, this paper remained unpublished for 19 years because the Cultural Revolution destroyed academic publishing in China. Fang reported that his studies were halted for the ten years of the Cultural Revolution, which lasted from 1966 to 1976.

After graduating from Peking University, he undertook postgraduate studies at the Institute of Mathematics of Academia Sinica, which had less "political chaos" than Peking University, according to Fang. There, as a postgraduate researcher, Fang was supervised by Minyi Yue. In 1965, he was assigned to the Anshan Steel and Iron Company, where he gave lectures to engineers and worked on nonlinear regression, before being sent to a rural village to work as a laborer for the rest of 1965 and 1966. In 1972 Fang and other staff at the Academy of Sciences promoted the use of experimental design to improve Tsingtao Beer.

=== Revival of academic life ===
Fang was successively appointed to be assistant researcher and assistant professor in 1978. He then joined the Institute of Applied Mathematics of the Chinese Academy of Sciences, and he became Associate Professor in 1980 and associate director of the institute in 1984. He was appointed full professor in 1986.

== Multivariate analysis ==
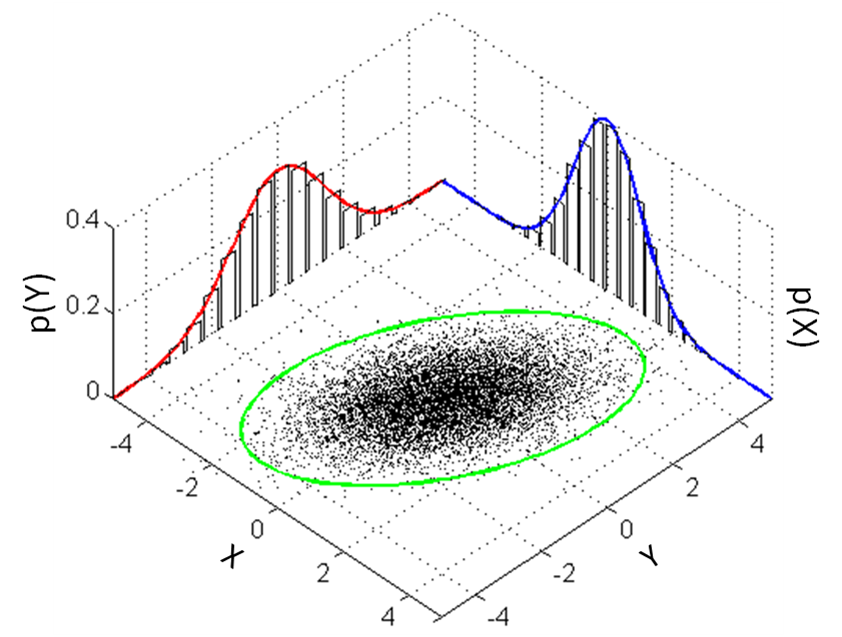
Fang has contributed to the theory of elliptical distributions, like bivariate normal distribution (pictured), which have elliptical contours.

In mathematical statistics, Fang has published textbooks and monographs in multivariate analysis. In particular, his books have extended classical multivariate analysis beyond the multivariate normal distribution to a generalized multivariate analysis using more general elliptical distributions, which have elliptically contoured distributions.

His book on Generalized multivariate analysis (with Zhang) has extensive results on multivariate analysis for elliptical distributions, to which T. W. Anderson refers readers of his An introduction to multivariate statistical analysis (3rd ed., 2003). The Fang and Zhang monograph used matrix differential calculus. One of Generalized multivariate analysis's innovations was its extensive use of the multilinear algebra, particularly of the Kronecker product and of vectorization, according to Kollo and von Rosen. Fang and Zhang's Generalized multivariate analysis was honored as a "most excellent book in China" by the Government Information and Publication Administration.

== Combinatorial design and experiments: uniform designs ==
Fang also has conducted research in the design of experiments. In 1972, he worked with the Tsingdao Beer factory and other factories. He and other mathematical statisticians at the Chinese Academy of Sciences promoted the industrial use of orthogonal designs. Orthogonal designs are discussed in the books and papers of Fang on "uniform designs" and also by other authors.

Fang recognized that high-dimensional combinatorial designs, which had been used for numerical integration on the unit cube by Hua Luogeng and Wang Yuan, could be used to study interaction, for example, in factorial experiments and response surface methodology. Collaborating with Wang led to Fang's uniform designs, which have been used also in computer simulations.
