= Order Number One (Lin Biao) =

Military emergency order

Order Number One by Lin Biao (simplified Chinese: 林副主席第一个号令; traditional Chinese: 林副主席第一個號令) was a military emergency order issued by Lin Biao, then Vice Chairman of the Chinese Communist Party and Vice President of the Central Military Commission, on October 18, 1969. The order required all personnel of the People's Liberation Army to enter the emergency state of combat readiness and to prepare for the imminent attack including nuclear strike from the Soviet Union.

== History ==
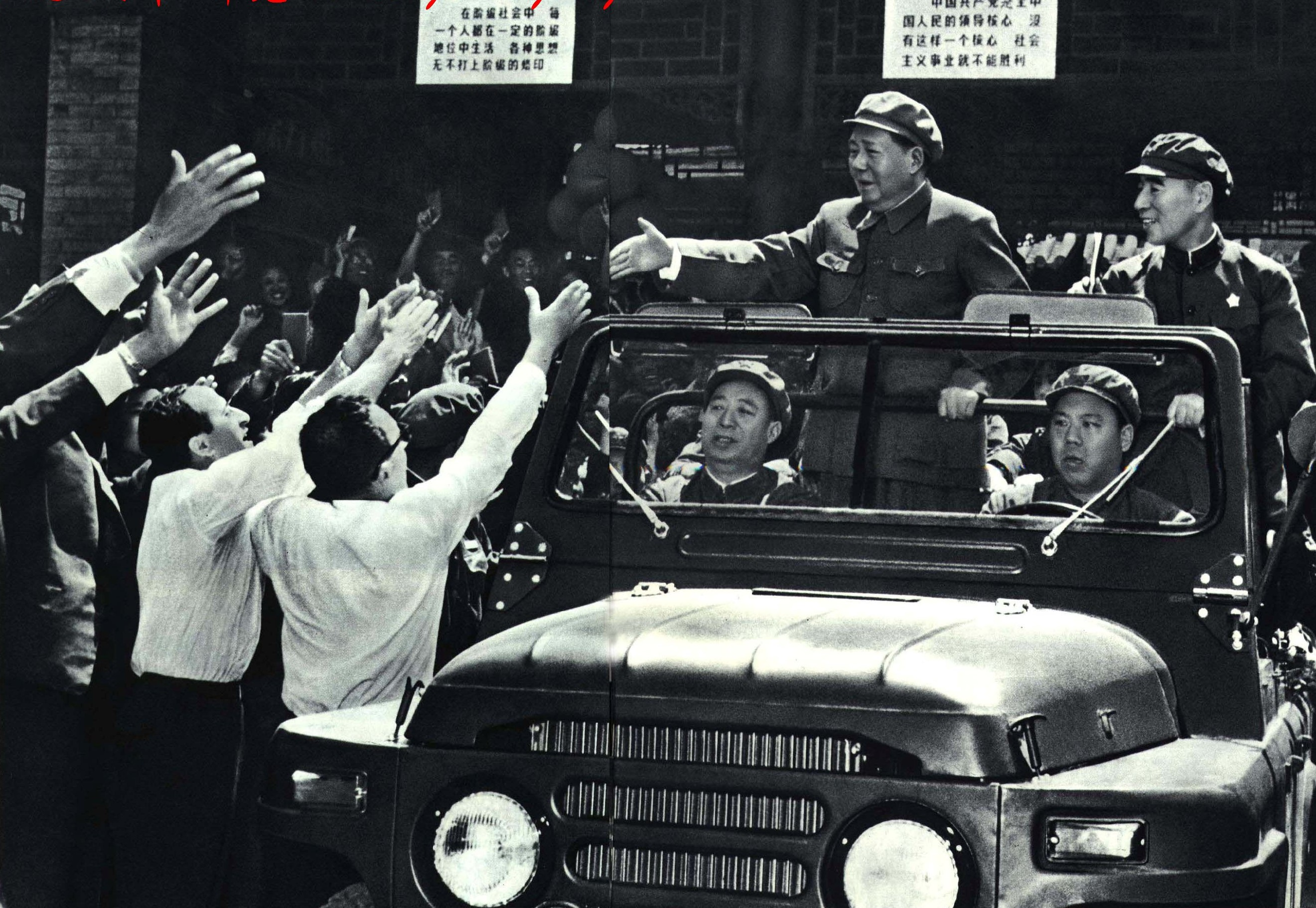
Mao Zedong and Lin Biao in a car (1967)

With the Sino-Soviet split in the 1960s, the tension between the two countries reached its climax after the Zhenbao Island Incident in March 1969. The Soviet Union planned to launch a large-scale nuclear strike against China. Meanwhile, Lin Biao was named the successor of Chairman Mao Zedong at the 9th National Congress of the Chinese Communist Party (CCP) in April 1969, during which the CCP leaders were also preparing for the war with the Soviet.

On October 14, 1969, the Central Committee of the CCP released an urgent evacuation order to the Party and state leaders in Beijing, requiring all leaders to leave Beijing by October 20 given the high likelihood of an imminent Soviet nuclear attack. Mao travelled to Wuhan and Lin travelled to Suzhou, while Premier Zhou Enlai remaining in charge in Beijing. On October 17, Lin Biao issued an emergency order to put all PLA personnel on alert; on the next day, Lin's followers including Huang Yongsheng released the order as "Order Number One" by Vice President Lin, and all PLA members henceforth entered the emergency state of combat readiness. This was the first time in the history of the People's Republic of China (since 1949) that its nuclear force, the Second Artillery Corp, was on full alert.

== Aftermath ==
After the Lin Biao Incident on September 14, 1971, his "Order Number One" in 1969 was viewed by some as an evidence of Lin's intention to usurp Mao Zedong's leadership or even a coup. According to some sources, Lin only reported to Mao regarding "Order Number One" on October 19, 1969, after the order had been released to PLA, and upon hearing the report, Mao's immediate comment was that the order should be burned.

== See also ==
- Sino-Soviet border conflict
- Sino-Soviet split
- Cultural Revolution
