= 86th Division (1st Formation) (People's Republic of China) =

86th Division (1949–51)
- Active: 1949.2 – 1951.2
- Country: People's Republic of China
- Branch: People's Liberation Army
- Type: Division
- Role: Infantry
- Part of: 29th Corps
- Engagements: Chinese Civil War

The 86th Division (Chinese: 第86师) was created in February 1949 under the Regulation of the Redesignations of All Organizations and Units of the Army, issued by Central Military Commission on November 1, 1948, basing on the 32nd Brigade, 11th Column of the Huadong Field Army formed in May 1947.

The division was a part with 29th Corps. It took part in several major battles during the Chinese Civil War, including Lianshui Campaign, Huaihai Campaign, Shanghai Campaign, Fuzhou Campaign and Zhangxia Campaign.

The division was composed of 256th, 257th and 258th Infantry Regiments.

In June 1950, Artillery Regiment, 86th Division was activated.

In October the division was transferred to PLAAF control after 29th Corps' disbandment.

In February 1951 the division was inactivated:

- Headquarters, 86th Division was converted to Headquarters, 11th Aviation Division;
- 256th and 258th Infantry Regiments were converted to 31st and 33rd Aviation Regiments of 11th Aviation Division, respectively;
- 257th Infantry Regiment was converted to 49th Aviation Regiment of 17th Aviation Division;
- Artillery Regiment, 86th Division was converted to 3rd Aviation Prior Course Contingent of the PLAAF.
