= Wang Yuan (mathematician) =

Chinese mathematician (1930–2021)

- Born: 29 April 1930; Lanxi, Zhejiang, China
- Died: 14 May 2021 (aged 91); Beijing, China
- Education: Zhejiang University
- Known for: Number theory, History of mathematics, Numerical analysis, Design of experiments
- Scientific career
- Fields: Mathematics
- Workplaces: Chinese Academy of Sciences
- Doctoral advisor: Hua Luogeng
- Notable students: Shou-Wu Zhang

Wang Yuan (Chinese: 王元; pinyin: Wáng Yuán; 29 April 1930 – 14 May 2021) was a Chinese mathematician and writer known for his contributions to the Goldbach conjecture. He was a president of the Chinese Mathematical Society and head of the Institute of Mathematics, Chinese Academy of Sciences.

== Life ==
Wang was born in Lanxi, Zhejiang, China. His father was a magistrate in the local government. Because of the Japanese invasion (the Second Sino-Japanese War), Wang's family had to move away from Zhejiang Province, and finally arrived at the southeast city Kunming in Yunnan in 1938. 1942, Wang's father rose to the position of Chief Secretary of the Academia Sinica. 1946 after the Japanese surrender, his family moved to the capital city, Nanjing. 1946–1949, Wang's father was the Acting Director of the institute. In 1949, Wang separated with his father, who went to Taiwan.

Wang entered Yingshi University (later merged into National Chekiang University, now Zhejiang University) in Hangzhou, and graduated from the Department of Mathematics in 1952. He then earned a position in the Institute of Mathematics, Academia Sinica. Hua Luogeng was his academic adviser and one of his closest collaborators.

In 1966, Wang's career was interrupted by the Cultural Revolution. He was unable to work for more than five years, until 1972. During this time, Wang was harassed and put through interrogation.

In 1978, Wang was back to his professorship, in the Institute of Mathematics at the Chinese Academy of Sciences. In 1980, he was elected to be a member of Chinese Academy of Science. 1988–1992, he was the president of the Chinese Mathematical Society. Wang also worked in the United States for a period of time. He visited the Institute of Advanced Studies and taught at the University of Colorado.

Wang advised Shou-Wu Zhang when he studied at the Chinese Academy of Sciences for his master's degree from 1983 to 1986.

Wang is the father of Chinese American computer scientist James Z. Wang.

== Research ==
=== Number theory ===
Wang's research focused on the area of number theory, especially in the Goldbach conjecture, through sieve theory and the Hardy-Littlewood circle method. He obtained a series of important results in the field of number theory.

=== Numerical integration and statistics ===
With Hua Luogeng (华罗庚, alternatively Hua Loo-Keng), he developed high-dimensional combinatorial designs for numerical integration on the unit cube. Their work came to the attention of the statistician Kai-Tai Fang, who realized that their results could be used in the design of experiments. In particular, their results could be used to investigate interaction, for example, in factorial experiments and response surface methodology. Collaborating with Fang led to uniform designs, which have been used also in computer simulations.

=== Books ===
- Wang, Yuan (1991). Diophantine equations and inequalities in algebraic number fields. Berlin: Springer-Verlag. doi:10.1007/978-3-642-58171-7. ISBN 9783642634895. OCLC 851809136.
- Wang, Yuan (2005). Wang, Yuan (ed.). Selected papers of Wang Yuan. Singapore: World Scientific. ISBN 9812561978. OCLC 717731203.
- Fang, Kai-Tai; Wang, Yuan (1993). Number-theoretic methods in statistics. Chapman and Hall Monographs on Statistics and Applied Probability. Vol. 51. CRC Press. ISBN 0412465205. OCLC 246555560. Archived from the original on 5 March 2017.
