= 28th Group Army =

28th Corps (1949-60) 28th Army Corps (1960-85) 28th Army (1985-98)
- Active: 1949 - 1998
- Country: (China)
- Part of: Beijing Military Region
- Garrison/HQ: Datong, Shanxi
- Engagements: Chinese Civil War; Battle of Guningtou; Korean War; Vietnam War

The 28th Group Army was an army corps of the Chinese People's Liberation Army that existed from 1949 to 1998. From 1952 to 1971, the 28th Army was based in Putian, Fujian and belonged to the Fujian Military Region. From 1971 to 1998, this army corps belonged to the Beijing Military Region and was based in Shanxi Province, initially in Houma and then in Datong. At the time of its dissolution in 1998, the 28th Army was composed of the 82nd, 83rd and 205th Infantry Divisions, the 7th Armored Division, an artillery brigade, an anti-aircraft brigade, an engineer regiment, a communication regiment and a reconnaissance battalion. The army corps’ unit ID number was 51366.

== History ==
=== Formation and lineage ===
The 28th Group Army was formed in February 1949 out of the 10th Column of the East China Field Army and consisted of the 82nd, 83rd and 84th Divisions.

The 28th Army traces its lineage to the Eighth Route Army’s guerilla units in the Bohai Military District of Shandong during the Second Sino-Japanese War. After the end of World War II, most units of the Bohai Military Districts were relocated to Manchuria but the remaining units were reorganized into the 7th and 11th Divisions of the Shandong People’s Liberation Army in 1946. At the outset of the Chinese Civil War in February 1947, these two divisions became the 10th Column of the East China Field Army, with 116,000 troops, under the command of General Song Shilun. In 1947, the 10th Column defeated Li Xianzhou’s Nationalist forces in the Battle of Laiwu and then participated in the Battles of Taian and Menglianggu in April and May. The 10th Column then covered the advance of the Jin-Ji-Lu-Yu Field Army into the Dabie Mountains in June and spent the fall fighting along the Longhai Railway.

In early 1948, the 10th Column fought in the border region of southern Henan, northern Anhui, and northern Jiangsu. In the summer and early fall, the 10th Column participated in the capture of Kaifeng and Jinan. and, in the winter of 1948, the Liaoshen Campaign.

When the 10th Column became the 28th Army in February 1949, the unit had 34,000 troops.

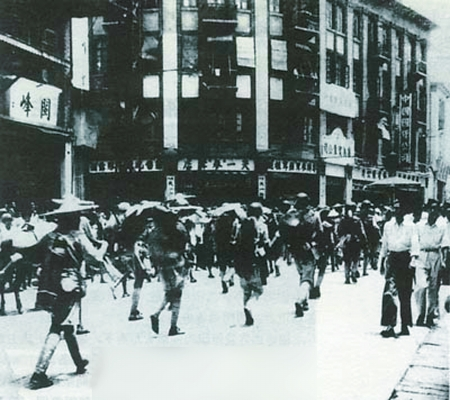
The 28th Army entering Fuzhou on August 17, 1949.

=== Operations after formation ===
In April 1949, the 28th Army crossed the Yangtze River at Jiangyin and captured Taicang and Jiading in the Shanghai Campaign. In July, the army entered Fujian and in October, captured Fuzhou, Fuqing and Pingtan. The invasion of Kinmen Island ended in failure and the 28th Army lost all 9,086 troops contributed to the mission. At the end of 1949, the 28th Army was tasked with “bandit suppression” in Fujian. In 1952, the 28th Army was headquartered at Putian and belonged to the Fujian Military Region.

After the outbreak of Sino-Soviet Border clashes in 1969, the 28th Army was relocated from Putian north to Houma, Shanxi in 1971. In 1985, headquarters were moved to Datong and the 84th Division was dissolved.

=== Tiananmen protests of 1989 ===
The 28th Army was notable for its passive enforcement of the martial law order against the Tiananmen Square protests of 1989. The 28th Army, led by commander He Yanran and political commissar Zhang Mingchun and based in Datong, Shanxi Province, received the mobilization order on May 19 and led the 82nd and 83rd Divisions by motorized transport to Beijing. Like other PLA units trying to enforce martial law, the 28th Army's advance into the city was blocked by students and residents. The 28th Army retreated to Yanqing County northwest of Beijing's city centre.

When ordered to enter the city on June 3, the 28th encountered protesting residents along route but did not open fire and missed the deadline to reach Tiananmen Square by 5:30 am on June 4. At 7:00am, the 28th Army ran into a throng of angry residents at Muxidi on West Chang'an Avenue west of the Square. The residents told the soldiers of the killings from earlier in the morning and showed blood stained shirts of victims. At noon, Liu Huaqing, the commander of the martial law enforcement action, ordered Wang Hai, head of the PLA Air Force, to fly over Muxidi in by helicopter and order by loud speaker the 28th Army to counterattack. But on the ground, the commanders of the 28th refused to comply. Instead the troops abandoned their positions en masse. By 5:00 pm, many had retreated into the Military Museum of the Chinese People's Revolution nearby. Of all units involved in the crackdown, the 28th Army lost by far the most equipment, as 74 vehicles including 31 armored personnel and two communications vehicles were burned. The unit was later removed and ordered to undergo six months of reorganization. Afterwards, all commanding officers were demoted and reassigned to other units.

Commander He Yanran was court-martialled and demoted. Political commissar Zhang Mingchun was demoted to political commissar of the Jilin Military District. Chief of Staff Qiu Jinkai was demoted to the Guizhou Military District, but was re-elevated in 1993 to become the deputy commander of the 27th Army. He became the commander of the 27th Army and held the position for a decade. In 2004, Qiu became the chief of staff of the Beijing Military Region and in 2005 became the deputy commander of the military region as well as the commander of the Beijing Garrison.

=== Dissolution ===
In 1998, the 28th Army was dissolved as a unit with the 82nd Motorized Infantry Division assigned to the 63rd Army, and the 7th Tank Division, reorganized as the 7th Armored Brigade, assigned to the 65th Army. The 83rd Infantry Division became a local reserve division in Shanxi. The 205th Division, downsized to a brigade, was assigned to the Inner Mongolia Military District.
