= Yangzhou High School of Jiangsu Province =

- 江苏省扬州中学
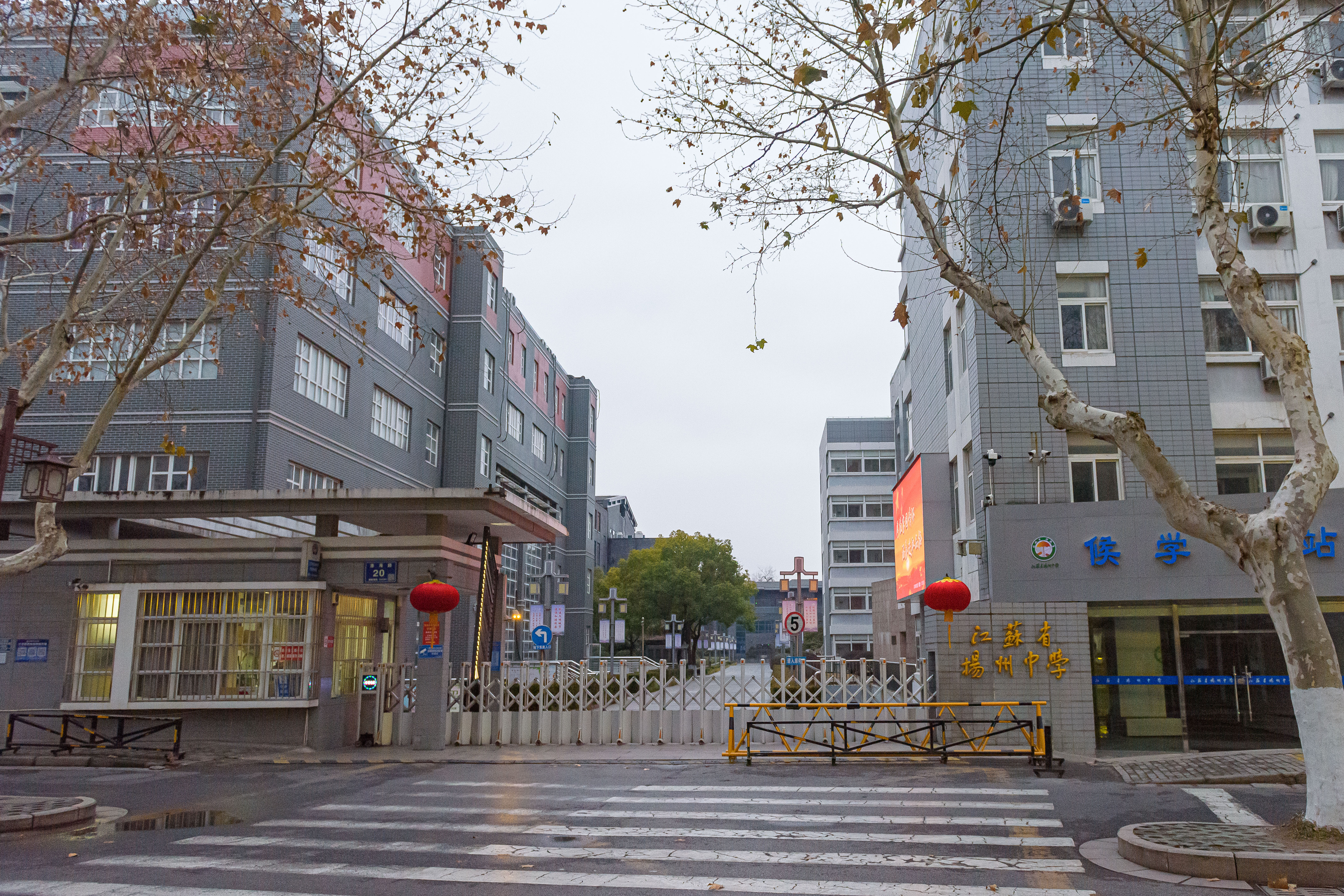
- Yangzhou, Jiangsu; China

Information
- Type: Public
- Established: 1902
- Principal: Xue Yirong
- Enrollment: 2200
- Website: www.yzzx.org

Yangzhou High School of Jiangsu Province (Chinese: 江苏省扬州中学) is a high school in Yangzhou, Jiangsu, China. It grew out of Yidong School, which was established in 1902.

== Notable alumni ==
- Professor Kai-Tai Fang, a mathematical statistician.
- Hu Qiaomu, former member of the Politburo of the Chinese Communist Party
- Jiang Zemin, former General Secretary of the Chinese Communist Party
