= 2nd Independent Division of Fujian Provincial Military District =

2nd Independent Division of Fujian Provincial Military District (1966–76) Independent Division of Fujian Provincial Military District (1976–80)
- Active: 1966.4 - 1980.12
- Country: People's Republic of China
- Branch: People's Liberation Army
- Type: Division
- Role: Infantry
- Garrison/HQ: Nanping, Fujian

2nd Independent Division of Fujian Provincial Military District (Chinese: 福建省军区独立第2师) was formed in April 1966 from the Public Security Contingent of Fujian province. The division was composed of three regiments (4th to 6th). The division stationed in Putian, Fujian.

From November 1969 the division was transferred to 29th Army Corps.

In April 1975 the division moved to Nanping for security mission.

In February 1976 the division was renamed as Independent Division of Fujian Provincial Military District (Chinese: 福建省军区独立师). Its 4th, 5th and 6th regiments were renamed as 1st, 2nd and 3rd Infantry Regiments. Artillery Regiment was formed in the same month.

In December 1980 the division was disbanded.
