= 87th Division (2nd Formation) (People's Republic of China) =

215th Division (1949–52) 215th Infantry Division (1952–60) 215th Army Division (1960–69) 89th Army Division (1969–76) 87th Army Division (1976–85)
- Active: 1949.11 – 1985.10
- Country: People's Republic of China
- Branch: People's Liberation Army
- Type: Division
- Role: Infantry
- Part of: 29th Army Corps
- Engagements: Chinese Civil War

The 215th Division (Chinese: 第215师) was created in November 1949 under the Regulation of the Redesignations of All Organizations and Units of the Army, issued by Central Military Commission on November 1, 1948, basing on the 2nd Division, 1st Corps, 1st Army Group of the People's Liberation Army of the Nationalist Party of China. Its history can be traced to the 177th Division, 38th Corps of the National Revolutionary Army formed in March 1937, which defected along with the 1st Army Group of Republic of China Army in August 1948. During its history in NRA, it took part in several major battles in the Second Sino-Japanese War.

The division is part of 52nd Corps. Under the flag of 215th division it took part in the Chinese Civil War. In September 1951 the division was transferred to 21st Army Group's control following 52nd Corps' disbandment. In October 21st Army Group was reorganized as 55th Corps. In 1952 the division was renamed as 215th Infantry Division (Chinese: 步兵第215师). By then the division was composed of:

- 643rd Infantry Regiment;
- 644th Infantry Regiment;
- 645th Infantry Regiment;
- 544th Artillery Regiment.

In 1960 the division was renamed as 215th Army Division (Chinese: 陆军第215师).

In October 1969 the division was detached from the Army Corps and transferred to Fuzhou Military Region's control. In December the division was renamed as 89th Army Division (Chinese: 陆军第89师), and all its regiments were renamed as follows:

- 265th Infantry Regiment (former 643rd);
- 266th Infantry Regiment (former 644th);
- 267th Infantry Regiment (former 645th);
- Artillery Regiment (former 544th).

In April 1975 the division was transferred to 29th Army Corps' control.

In February 1976 the division was renamed as 87th Army Division (Chinese: 陆军第87师), and all its regiments were renamed as follows:

- 259th Infantry Regiment (former 265th);
- 260th Infantry Regiment (former 266th);
- 261st Infantry Regiment (former 267th);
- Artillery Regiment.

In October 1985 the division was disbanded: its divisional HQ and artillery regiment was re-organized as 3rd Artillery Brigade of Nanjing Military Region; its 261st Infantry Regiment was transferred to 92nd Infantry Division.
