= Li Xianzhou =

- Born: 1894 Jinan, Shandong
- Died: October 22, 1988 (aged 93–94) Jinan, Shandong
- Allegiance: Republic of China
- Branch: (Republic of China (1912–1949)) National Revolutionary Army
- Rank: Lieutenant General
- Conflicts: Northern Expedition; Second Sino-Japanese War; Chinese Civil War

Li Xianzhou (李仙洲) (1894 - October 22, 1988) was a Kuomintang general from Shandong. He was a graduate of the Whampoa Military Academy.

== 2nd phase of the Chinese Civil War ==
After the victory of the Anti-Japanese War in 1945, he was transferred to Jinan as Deputy Commander-in-Chief of the Second Appeasement District. In February 1947, the 46th Division and the 73rd Army were ordered to attack Laiwu and Xintai from Mingshui and Zichuan, preparing to attack the East China Field Army from north to south. The East China Field Army launched the Battle of Laiwu and was framed by Communist spy Han Liancheng. Li Xianzhou led all the divisions with more than 65,000 people. Li Xianzhou himself was captured and Wang Yaowu scolded afterwards: "60,000 pigs wouldn't even have capitulated in just half a day. " He was later detained as a war criminal, reformed and educated, and was released on amnesty by the Supreme People's Court in November 1960. He died in his hometown at the age of 94.
