= Sino-Soviet border conflict =

Undeclared conflict between China and the Soviet Union

- Part of the Cold War and the Sino-Soviet split
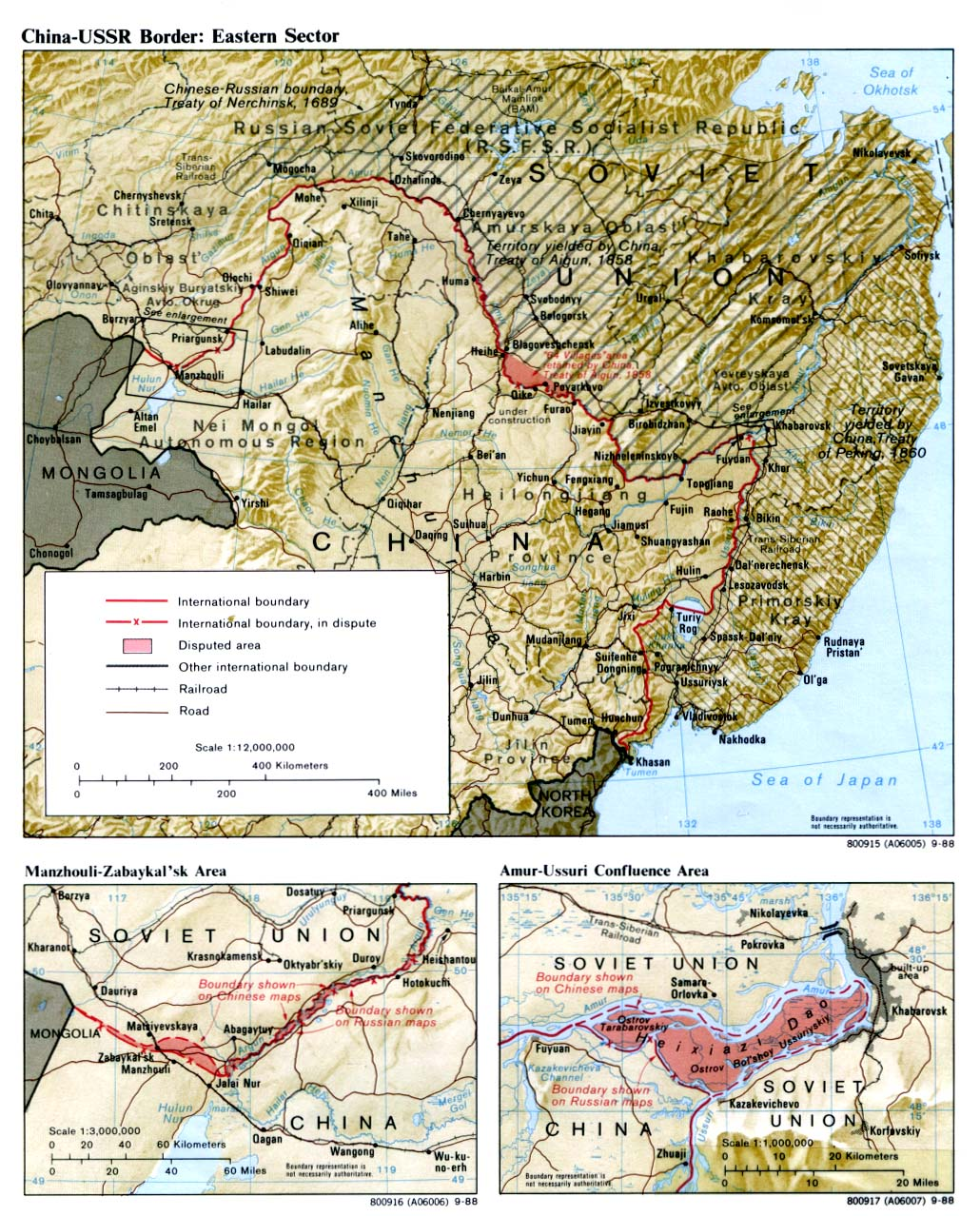
- Disputed areas in the Argun and Amur rivers. Damansky/Zhenbao is to the south-east, north of the lake.
Date	2 March – 11 September 1969 (6 months, 1 week and 2 days)
Location	Border between China and the Soviet Union
Result	Soviet victory
Territorial changes	Status quo ante bellum

Belligerents
Soviet Union	China

Commanders and leaders
Leonid Brezhnev	Mao Zedong

Strength
658,002	814,003

Casualties and losses
Soviet sources: 58 killed 95 wounded Chinese sources: 27 tanks/APCs destroyed 1 command car Dozens of trucks destroyed One Soviet T-62 tank captured	Chinese sources: 72 killed 68 wounded Soviet sources: 800 killed

The Sino-Soviet border conflict, also known as the Sino-Soviet crisis, was a seven-month undeclared military conflict between the Soviet Union and China in 1969, following the Sino-Soviet split. The most serious border clash, which brought the world's two largest communist states to the brink of war, occurred near Damansky (Zhenbao) Island on the Ussuri (Wusuli) River in Manchuria. Clashes also took place in Xinjiang.

In 1964, the Chinese revisited the matter of the Sino-Soviet border demarcated in the 19th century, claiming the region of Outer Manchuria originally ceded by the Qing dynasty to the Russian Empire by way of unequal treaties. Negotiations broke down amid heightening tensions and both sides began dramatically increasing military presence along the border. Sino-Soviet relations worsened further following the Soviet invasion of Czechoslovakia in 1968. Border confrontations escalated in March 1969 when a group of People's Liberation Army (PLA) troops launched a surprise attack on Soviet border guards on Zhenbao Island in Manchuria, resulting in dozens of casualties on both sides. Soviet leadership feared that despite superior nuclear and conventional weapons technology, the Soviet Army would struggle against the PLA's numbers, guerrilla warfare experience, and people's war doctrine. Historians have suggested Mao Zedong provoked the clash to further the radical sentiments of the Cultural Revolution or to elevate China's international standing towards the Cold War's two superpowers.

Further clashes occurred in August at Tielieketi in Xinjiang and raised the prospect of an all-out nuclear exchange. The crisis de-escalated after Soviet Premier Alexei Kosygin met with Chinese Premier Zhou Enlai on 11 September in Beijing, and a ceasefire was ordered with a return to the status quo ante bellum. In October, the Soviet Union contemplated a massive nuclear strike on China, prompting a government and military evacuation of Beijing.

To counterbalance the Soviet threat, the Chinese government sought a rapprochement with the United States. This resulted in a secret visit to China by Henry Kissinger in 1971, which in turn paved the way for President Richard Nixon's official visit to China in 1972. Sino-Soviet relations remained sour after the conflict despite the re-opening of border negotiations, which continued inconclusively for a decade. Serious talks did not occur until 1991, when an agreement was reached shortly before the fall of the Soviet Union. The border issues were conclusively resolved between China and Russia following a treaty signed in 2003 and an additional agreement in 2008.

== Background ==
Disputes between China and Russia on border issues date back to the eighteenth century.

=== History ===
Under the governorship of Sheng Shicai (1933–1944) in Northwest China's Xinjiang Province, China's Kuomintang recognized for the first time the ethnic category of a Uyghur people by following the Soviet ethnic policy. That ethnogenesis of a "national" people eligible for territorialized autonomy broadly benefited the Soviet Union, which organized conferences in Fergana and Semirechye (in Soviet Central Asia) to cause "revolution" in Altishahr (southern Xinjiang) and Dzungaria (northern Xinjiang).

Both the Soviet Union and the White Movement covertly allied with the Ili National Army to fight the Kuomintang in the Three Districts Revolution. Although the mostly Muslim Uyghur rebels participated in pogroms against Han Chinese generally, the turmoil eventually resulted in the replacement of Kuomintang rule in Xinjiang with that of the Chinese Communist Party.

In 1949, the People's Republic of China and the Soviet Union formed an alliance and both countries accepted the status quo along their border. In 1951, the two countries signed a Border Rivers Navigation Agreement.

Sino-Soviet border conflict
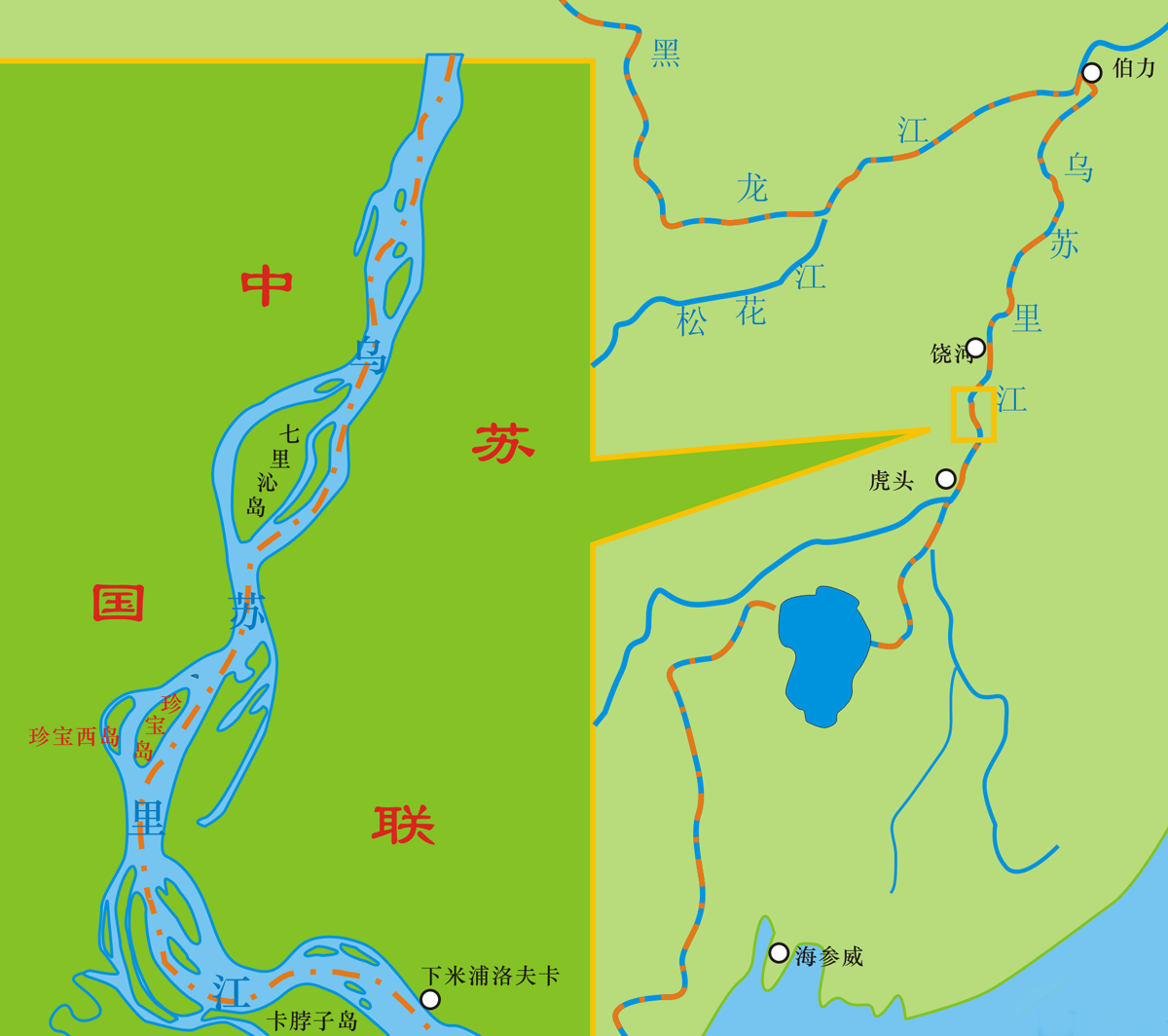
- Zhenbao Island and the border

Chinese name
- Traditional Chinese: 中蘇邊界衝突
- Simplified Chinese: 中苏边界冲突
Transcriptions
Standard Mandarin
- Hanyu Pinyin: Zhōng Sū biānjiè chōngtū
- IPA: [ʈʂʊ́ŋ sú pjɛ́ntɕjê ʈʂʰʊ́ŋtʰú]
Yue: Cantonese
- Jyutping: Zung1 Sou1 bin1gaai3 cung1dat6

Alternative Chinese name
- Traditional Chinese: 珍寶島自衛反擊戰
- Simplified Chinese: 珍宝岛自卫反击战
- Literal meaning: Zhenbao Island self-defense
Transcriptions
Standard Mandarin
- Hanyu Pinyin: Zhēnbǎo dǎo zìwèi fǎnjí zhàn

Russian name
- Russian: Пограничный конфликт на острове Даманском
- Romanization: Pograničnyj konflikt na ostrove Damanskom

As the Sino-Soviet split developed in the 1960s, border tensions emerged. Amid heightening tensions, the Soviet Union and China began border talks. Although the Soviet Union had yielded all of the territory of the Japanese puppet state of Manchukuo to the Chinese Communists in 1945, which decisively assisted them during the Chinese Civil War, the Chinese now demanded territorial concessions on the basis that the 19th-century treaties transferring ownership of the sparsely populated Outer Manchuria, concluded by Qing dynasty China and the Russian Empire, were "Unequal Treaties" and amounted to the annexation of rightful Chinese territory. Moscow would not accept that interpretation, but by 1964, both sides had reached a preliminary agreement on the eastern section of the border, including Zhenbao Island, which would be handed over to China.

In July 1964, CCP chairman Mao Zedong, in a meeting with the Japanese Socialist Party delegation, stated that Russia had unilaterally incorporated vast territories in Siberia and the Far East as far as Kamchatka. He stated that China and Russia still had not resolved this issue. The comments were leaked to the public. Outraged, Soviet Premier Nikita Khrushchev refused to approve the border agreement.

=== Geography ===
The border dispute in the west centered on 52,000 square kilometres (20,000 sq mi) of Soviet-controlled land in the Pamirs that lay on the border of Xinjiang and the Tajik Soviet Socialist Republic. In 1892, the Russian Empire and the Qing Dynasty had agreed that the border would consist of the ridge of the Sarikol Range, but the exact border remained contentious throughout the 20th century. In the 1960s, the Chinese began to insist that the Soviet Union evacuate the region.

From around 1900, after the Treaty of Peking (1860) had assigned Outer Manchuria (Primorskiy Kray) to Russia, the eastern part of the Sino-Soviet border had mainly been demarcated by three rivers, the Argun River from the tripartite junction with Mongolia to the north tip of China, running southwest to northeast, then the Amur River to Khabarovsk from northwest to southeast, where it was joined by the Ussuri River running south to north:

The modern method (used for the past 200 years) of demarcating a river boundary between states today is to set the boundary at either the median line (ligne médiane) of the river or around the area most suitable for navigation under what is known as the 'thalweg principle'.

There is nothing in either the 1858 or the 1860 treaty to suggest the border is anywhere other than the thalweg.

China claimed the islands, as they were on the Chinese side of the river if they were demarcated according to international law by using shipping lanes. The Soviets claimed and already effectively controlled almost every island along the rivers.

Russia and subsequently the Soviet Union claimed all the islands in both rivers including those that were Chinese according to the thalweg principle. In the 1991 treaty, Russia largely conceded that these islands were Chinese, but Bolshoy Ussuriysky Island, at the confluence of the Amur and the Ussuri Rivers, had become part of the Russian city of Khabarovsk, and China agreed that about two-thirds of the island should remain Russian.

=== Chinese and Soviet governments' views ===
The Soviets had possessed nuclear weapons for a longer time than the Chinese and so the Chinese adopted an asymmetric deterrence strategy that threatened a large conventional people's war in response to a Soviet counterforce nuclear first strike. Chinese numerical superiority was the basis of its strategy to deter a Soviet nuclear attack. Since 1949, Chinese strategy, as articulated by Mao, emphasized the superiority of "man over weapons". Although weapons were certainly an important component of warfare, Mao argued that they were "not the decisive factor; it is people, not things, that are decisive. The contest of strength is not only a contest of military and economic power, but also a contest of human power and morale." To Mao, "non-material" factors like "creativity, flexibility and high morale" were also "critical determinants in warfare".

The Soviets were not confident that they could win such a conflict. A Chinese incursion could threaten Blagoveshchensk, Vladivostok, and Khabarovsk, as well as crucial nodes of the Trans-Siberian Railroad, all close to the border. While the Chinese lacked nuclear missiles, a few of their nuclear-capable aircraft might reach Soviet targets. According to Arkady Shevchenko, a high-ranking Soviet defector to the United States, "The Politburo was terrified that the Chinese might make a mass intrusion into Soviet territory". A nightmare vision of invasion by millions of Chinese made the Soviet leaders almost frantic: "Despite our overwhelming superiority in weaponry, it would not be easy for the USSR to cope with an assault of this magnitude". China's "vast population and deep knowledge and experience in guerrilla warfare" would nearly certainly cause the Soviets' launching of an attack on China's nuclear program to end in both states being "mired in an endless war".

Concerns about Chinese manpower and its people's war strategy ran so deep that some bureaucrats in Moscow argued that the only way to defend against a massive conventional onslaught was to use nuclear weapons. Some even advocated deploying nuclear mines along the Sino-Soviet border. By threatening to initiate a prolonged conventional conflict in retaliation for a nuclear strike, Beijing used an asymmetric deterrence strategy that was intended to convince Moscow that the costs of an attack would outweigh the benefits.

China had found its strategic rationale. While most Soviet military specialists did not fear a Chinese nuclear reprisal and believed that China's arsenal was too small, rudimentary, and vulnerable to survive a first strike and to carry out a retaliatory attack, China's massive conventional army caused great concern.

Nikolai Ogarkov, a senior Soviet military officer, believed that a massive nuclear attack "would inevitably mean world war". Even a limited counterforce strike on China's nuclear facilities was dangerous, Ogarkov argued, because a few nuclear weapons would "hardly annihilate" a country the size of China, which, in response, would "fight unrelentingly".

The USSR had watched with disbelief the chaos and attacks on Soviet citizens in China during the Cultural Revolution, which increased fears of Chinese unpredictability. Soviets were aware of their numerical inferiority; Leonid Brezhnev cited Mao's infamous speech at the 1957 International Meeting of Communist and Workers Parties, in which he said "I'm not afraid of nuclear war" because even if half of all Chinese died, "there are still 300 million people left". "How will the war between the USSR and China end?", one popular Russian joke asked: "With the unconditional surrender of the USSR after it has taken 400 million Chinese as prisoners of war". Many dark jokes alluded to a future in which Russians would have to learn Chinese. Famous dissident Andrei Amalrik predicted in Will the Soviet Union Surve Until 1984? (1970) that war with China would begin within ten years and cause the USSR's collapse.

== Eastern border: Heilongjiang (1969) ==
The Soviet Border Service started to report an intensifying Chinese military activity in the region in the early 1960s. Tensions at first built slowly, but the Cultural Revolution made them rise much faster. The number of troops on both sides of the Sino-Soviet border increased dramatically after 1964. Militarily, in 1961, the Soviets had 225,000 men and 200 aircraft at the border. In 1968, there were 375,000 men, 1,200 aircraft and 120 medium-range missiles. China had 1.5 million men stationed at the border and had tested its first nuclear weapon (the 596 Test in October 1964, at Lop Nur basin). Both sides' political rhetoric was increasingly hostile.

The key moment in escalating Sino-Soviet tensions was the Soviet invasion of Czechoslovakia on 20–21 August 1968 and the proclamation of the Brezhnev Doctrine that the Soviets had the right to overthrow any communist government that was diverging from what was defined by the Kremlin. Mao saw the Brezhnev Doctrine as the ideological justification for a Soviet invasion of China to overthrow him and launched a massive propaganda campaign attacking the invasion of Czechoslovakia, although he had condemned the Prague Spring as "revisionism". On 21 August 1968, the Romanian leader, Nicolae Ceaușescu, gave a speech in Revolution Square in Bucharest that denounced the invasion of Czechoslovakia. It was widely seen both in Romania and abroad as virtual declaration of independence from the Soviet Union. Romania began to move away from the Soviet sphere of influence, towards the Chinese sphere of influence.

Speaking at a banquet held at the Romanian embassy in Beijing on 23 August 1968, Zhou Enlai denounced the Soviet Union for "fascist politics, great power chauvinism, national egoism and social imperialism". He went on to compare the invasion of Czechoslovakia to the Americans in the Vietnam War and more pointedly to the policies of Adolf Hitler towards Czechoslovakia in 1938 to 1939. Zhou ended his speech with a barely veiled call for the people of Czechoslovakia to wage guerrilla war against the Red Army.

The Chinese historian Li Danhui wrote, "Already in 1968, China began preparations to create a small war on the border." She noted that prior to March 1969, the Chinese troops had twice attempted to provoke a clash along the border, "but the Soviets, feeling weak, did not accept the Chinese challenge and retreated." Another Chinese historian, Yang Kuisong, wrote, "There were already significant preparations in 1968, but the Russians did not come, so the planned ambush was not successful."

=== Battle of Zhenbao (Damansky) Island ===
Zhenbao (Damansky) Island incident
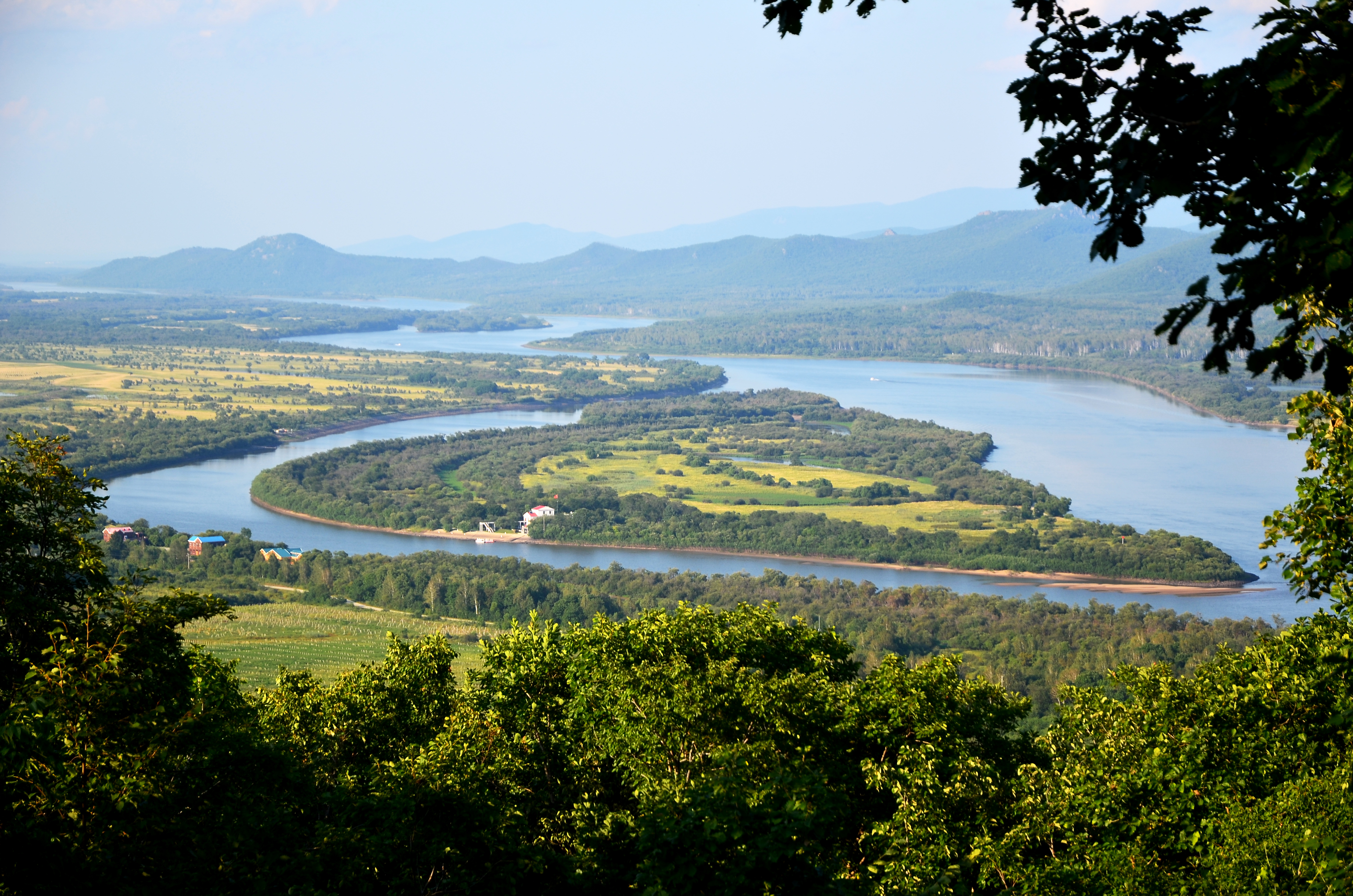
- Zhenbao (Damansky) Island
Date	2–17 March 1969 (2 weeks and 1 day)
Location	Zhenbao (Damansky) Island, Ussuri River
Result	Indecisive; both sides claim victory

Belligerents
China	Soviet Union

Commanders and leaders
Sun Yuguo; Chen Xilian	Oleg Losik; Demokrat Leonov †

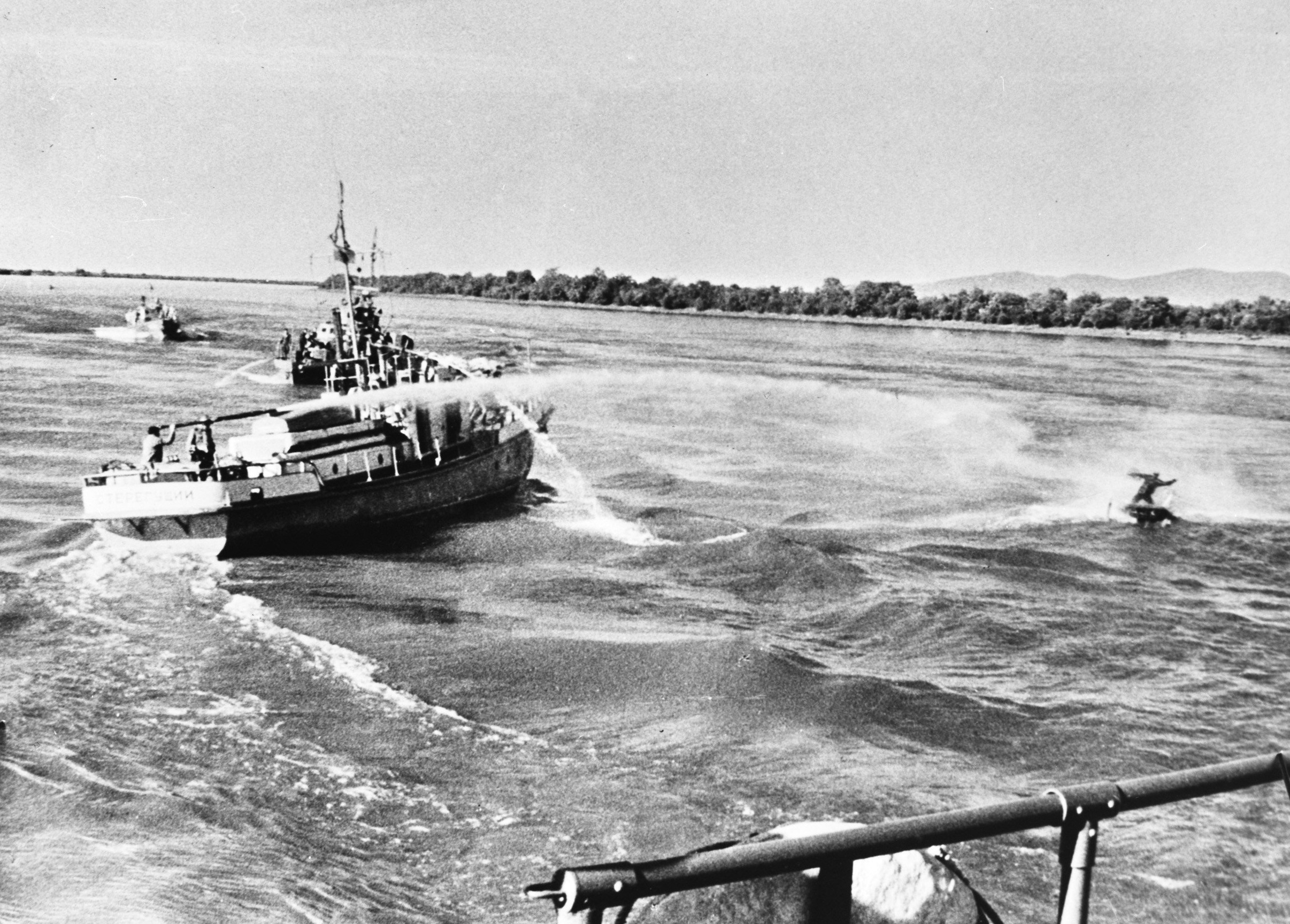
A Soviet ship using a water cannon against a Chinese fisherman on the Ussuri River, 6 May 1969

On 2 March 1969, a group of People's Liberation Army troops ambushed Soviet border guards on Zhenbao Island. According to Chinese sources, the Soviets suffered 58 dead and wounded. The Chinese losses were reported as 29 dead. According to Soviet sources, at least 248 Chinese troops were killed on the island and on the frozen river, and 32 Soviet border guards were killed, with 14 wounded.

Both sides have since blamed the other for the start of the conflict. However, a scholarly consensus has emerged that the border crisis had been a premeditated act of aggression orchestrated by the Chinese side. The American scholar Lyle J. Goldstein noted that Russian documents released since the glasnost era paint an unflattering picture of the Red Army command in the Far East with senior generals surprised by the outbreak of the fighting and of Red Army units haphazardly committed to action in a piecemeal style, but all of the documents speak of the Chinese as the aggressors. Most Chinese historians agree that on 2 March 1969, Chinese forces planned and executed an ambush, which took the Soviets completely by surprise. The reasons for the Chinese leadership to opt for such an offensive measure against the Soviets remains a disputed question.

According to Robinson, who based his analysis mostly on Soviet sources due to the lack of factual reports from the Chinese at the time of writing, on 2 March around 11:00 Chinese forces ambushed an unsuspecting Soviet border patrol on the island and inflicted heavy losses on the patrol. Shortly, Soviet reinforcements arrived from the nearby outpost and allegedly pinned the Chinese down, surrounded them for a time and then forced the remaining Chinese to retreat to their side of the bank. The entire battle lasted about two hours. Both sides claimed victory, however, neither force remained permanently on the island after the battle was over, although the Soviets periodically moved off and on at will.

Robinson wrote that it is not clear who began a battle of 15 March. Both sides claimed that the other side attacked their early-morning patrol. The battle started around 09:45 or 10:00 with artillery fire from the Chinese bank. Initially an outnumbering Chinese force managed to make Soviets to either leave the island entirely or withdraw to its eastern extremity. A consequent counterattack by Russian tanks and mechanized infantry supported by three waves of intense artillery fire at 13:00 apparently broke the Chinese positions on the island and the Chinese retreated to their own bank. The battle was over at 19:00. Soviets did not follow up the Chinese retreat with large-scale garrisoning of the island, although they continued intense patrolling.

There is an alternative interpretation of the events. The Cultural Revolution increased tensions between China and the Soviets, which led to brawls between border patrols. On 27 December 1968, several Soviet armored vehicles landed on Zhenbao Island, and Soviet soldiers used sticks to beat Chinese soldiers. On 23 January 1969, another violent conflict occurred on the island, and 28 Chinese soldiers were reportedly wounded. From 6 to 25 February 1969, five more similar incidents occurred, and shooting broke out in March 1969. According to the Chinese version of events, at 08:40 on the 2 March 1969, 30 Chinese border patrol personnel split into two groups approached the island and were met by about 70 Soviet soldiers along with one truck and reinforced with two armoured vehicles attempting to encircle the Chinese patrol. The Chinese claim the Soviets had opened fire at 09:17. The Soviets responded with tanks, armoured personnel carriers (APCs), and artillery bombardment. Over three days, the PLA successfully halted Soviet penetration and eventually evicted all Soviet troops from Zhenbao Island. During the skirmish, the Chinese deployed two reinforced infantry platoons with artillery support. Chinese sources state the Soviets deployed some 60 soldiers and six BTR-60 amphibious APCs, and in a second attack, some 100 troops backed up by 10 tanks and 14 APCs including artillery. The PLA had prepared for that confrontation for two to three months.

From among the units, the Chinese selected 900 soldiers commanded by army staff members with combat experience. They were provided with special training and special equipment and were secretly dispatched to take position on Zhenbao Island in advance. Chinese General Chen Xilian stated the Chinese had won a clear victory on the battlefield.

On 15 March, initial Soviet attacks were repulsed after suffering heavy losses. The Soviet border troops did not fight again, a battalion under Lieutenant Colonel Smirnov from the 135th Motorized Infantry Division went on the attack. The battalion, which came under heavy machine gun fire from the Chinese, sustained heavy losses and withdrew from the island. By the end of 15 March Soviet General Oleg Losik ordered to deploy then-secret BM-21 "Grad" multiple rocket launchers. The Soviets fired 10,000 artillery rounds in a nine-hour engagement with the Chinese along with 36 sorties. Soviet officials believed the attack was devastating for the Chinese troops and materials, which could not be verified by Chinese sources. The Chinese troops left their positions on the island, and the Soviets withdrew to their positions on the Russian bank of the Ussuri River. Vladimir Gorodinsky claims that the main group of Chinese troops near the island did not suffer any significant losses as a result of the usage of BM-21 due to a mistake in the calculation by the Headquarters of the Rocket Forces. He claims that after 21:00, the Chinese began firing heavy mortars not only at the island but at the Soviet territory as well and Major V. Nesov, commander of the 135th Motorized Infantry Division, was forced to order the division and frontier guards to retreat 4–5 kilometers inland to avoid casualties. Maxwell notes that much of academic writing about the Zhenbao incident still argues that it resulted from an unprovoked aggressive action by China and that the USSR was unquestionably the victor.

On 16 March, the Soviets entered the island to collect their dead, with the Chinese holding their fire. On 17 March, the Soviets tried to recover a disabled T-62 tank from the island, but their effort was repelled by Chinese artillery. On 21 March, the Soviets sent a demolition team in an attempt to destroy the tank. The Chinese opened fire and thwarted the Soviet attempt. With the help of divers from the Chinese navy, the PLA pulled the T-62 tank onshore. The tank was later given to the Chinese Military Museum.

The periods just before and after the Damanski Island clashes were marked by a sudden increase in Soviet spy satellites launched, presumably to surveil Chinese forces. Ten satellites were orbited from 25 February to 23 April, six from Plesetsk Cosmodrome and four from Tyuratam, compared to just two in the prior two months and six in the subsequent months in 1969, and compared to six total in the same two-month period in 1968.

As relations further deteriorated after the battle, Lin Biao issued Order No. 1 to "strengthen combat readiness to prevent an enemy surprise strike". Among the measures taken, China's three top secret nuclear production plants, which were close to the border with the Soviet Union, relocated to Third Front areas.

Until 1991, the island remained contested. According to Chinese sources, the Chinese had built barracks and conducted constant presence on the island since August 1969. Ryabushkin claims that the Soviet border guards had continued to thwart all Chinese attempts to land on it until 10 September when they were ordered to cease fire, effectively surrendering the island, in preparation for the Kosygin-Zhou talks that happened on 11 September.

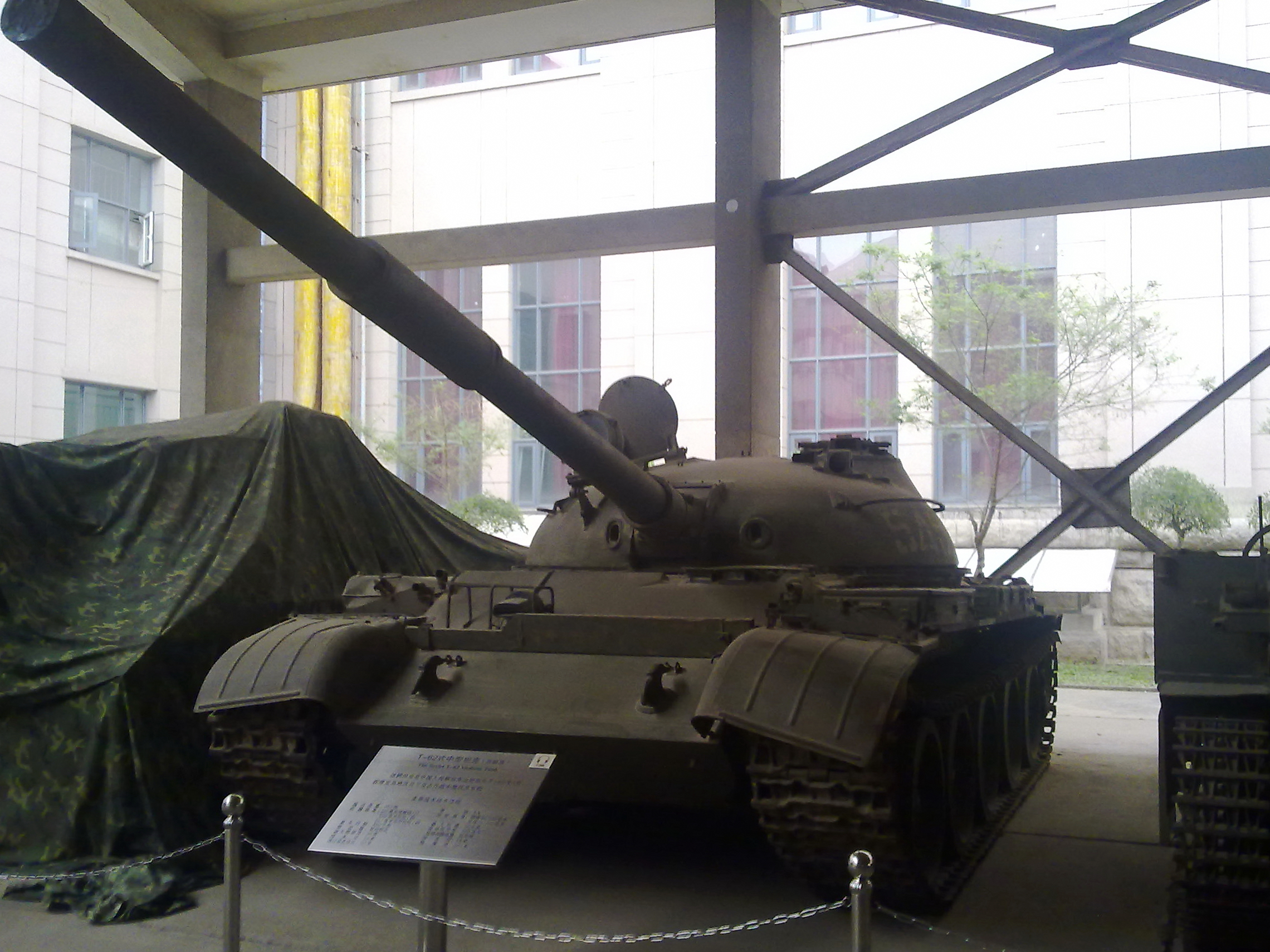
The Soviet T-62 tank that was captured by the Chinese during the 1969 clash is now on display at the Military Museum of the Chinese People's Revolution.

=== Soviet combat heroes ===
Five Soviet soldiers were awarded the top honour of Hero of the Soviet Union for bravery and valor during the Damansky conflict. Colonel Demokrat Leonov led the group of four T-62 tanks in a counterattack on 15 March and was killed by a Chinese sniper when he was leaving a destroyed vehicle.

Senior Lieutenant Vitaly Bubenin led a relief mission of 23 soldiers from the nearby border guard's outpost and conducted a BTR-60 raid into the Chinese rear that allegedly left 248 attackers dead. Junior Sergeant Yuri Babansky assumed command in a battle on 2 March, when the enemy had a 10–1 superiority, and when Senior Lieutenant Ivan Strelnikov was killed. Babansky later led combat search-and-rescue teams, which retrieved the bodies of Strelnikov and Leonov. Junior Sergeant Vladimir Orekhov took part in the 15 March battle. As a machine gunner, he was part of the first attacking line against the Chinese forces encamped on the island. He destroyed the enemy machine gun nest and was wounded twice, but he continued to fight until he died of his wounds. High military orders of Lenin, the Red Banner, the Red Star and Glory were awarded to 54 soldiers and officers, and the medals "For Courage" and "For Battle Merit" to 94 border guards and servicemen.

=== Chinese combat heroes ===
During the Zhenbao Island clashes with the Soviet Army in March 1969 one Chinese RPG team, Hua Yujie and his assistant Yu Haichang destroyed four Soviet APCs and achieved more than ten kills. Hua and Yu received the accolade "Combat Hero" from the CMC, and their action was commemorated on a postage stamp.

== Diplomacy ==
On 17 March 1969, an emergency meeting of the Warsaw Pact was called in Budapest by Brezhnev with the aim of condemning China. Romania's Ceaușescu refused, despite considerable Soviet pressure, to sign the statement condemning China. Ceaușescu's intransigence led to no statement being issued, which was widely seen as a Soviet diplomatic defeat. The next day, a meeting of the delegations representing 66 communist parties in Moscow discussed the preparations for a world summit in Moscow on 5 June 1969. A Soviet motion to condemn China failed, with the delegations representing the communist parties of Romania, Italy, Spain, Switzerland and Austria all supporting the Chinese position that it was the Soviet Union that had attacked China, rather than vice versa.

On 21 March, Soviet Premier Alexei Kosygin tried to phone Mao with the aim of discussing a ceasefire. The Chinese operator who took Kosygin's call called him a "revisionist element" and hung up. Zhou, who wanted to take up Kosygin's ceasefire offer, was shocked by what he regarded as Mao's recklessness: "The two countries are at war, one cannot chop the messenger." Diplomats from the Soviet embassy in Beijing spent much of 22 March in vain trying to get hold of Mao's private phone number so that Kosygin could call him to discuss peace. On 22 March, Mao had a meeting with the four marshals who commanded the Chinese troops in the border regions with the Soviet Union to begin preparations for a possible all-out war. Zhou repeatedly urged Mao to discuss a ceasefire but agreed with Mao's refusal to take phone calls from Kosygin. In an effort to placate Zhou, Mao told him, "Immediately prepare to hold diplomatic negotiations."

Between 1 and 24 April, the 9th National Congress of the Chinese Communist Party took place, and Mao proclaimed the official end of the Cultural Revolution, which he had begun in May 1966. Despite the official end of the Cultural Revolution, the Congress elected to key positions followers of the ultraleftist factions associated with Mao's powerful wife, Jiang Qing, and Defense Minister Lin Biao. Both Jiang and Lin favored a hard line towards the Soviet Union.

Meanwhile, Mao had ordered preparations for a "defense in depth" along the border because real fears had arisen of the border crisis escalating into all-out war. On 1 May, in a bid to repair China's image abroad, which had been badly damaged by the Cultural Revolution, Mao invited diplomats from several Third World nations to attend the May Day celebrations in Beijing. To the assembled diplomats, Mao formally apologized for the attacks by the Red Guards on diplomats in China and the smashing up of the embassies in Beijing in 1967. Mao claimed not to be aware of the fact that the Red Guards had been beating up and sometimes killing foreigners living in China during the Cultural Revolution. Also, Mao announced that for the first time since the Cultural Revolution, he would send out ambassadors to represent China abroad (most Chinese ambassadors had been recalled and executed during the Cultural Revolution with no replacements having been sent). By then, Mao had felt that China's isolation caused by the Cultural Revolution had become a problem since China was now on the brink of a war with the Soviet Union.

On 5 May, Kosygin traveled to India, which was strongly against China, to discuss with Prime Minister Indira Gandhi the possibility of a Soviet-Indian alliance against China. Between 14 and 19 May, Nikolai Podgorny visited North Korea to try to pull Kim Il Sung away from the Chinese orbit. Kim declined to move away from China, and in a show of support for Mao, North Korea sent no delegation to the world conference of communist parties that was held in Moscow in June.

On 17 June, US Senate Majority Leader Mike Mansfield, who had long been an advocate of normalizing American relations with China, wrote a letter, in consultation with the White House, that urged Mao to allow him to visit China and to meet with Mao to discuss measures to improve Sino-American relations. The letter was sent to King Norodom Sihanouk of Cambodia with the request to pass it on to Mao, and by 26 July, Mansfield's letter had arrived in Beijing. The Chinese reply was harsh, with Zhou giving a speech accusing the US of "aggression" in Vietnam and of "occupation" of Taiwan, which Zhou asserted was rightfully a part of China. On 1 August, US President Richard Nixon visited Pakistan, a close ally of China since both were anti-Indian, to ask General Yahya Khan to pass a message to Mao that he wanted to normalize relations with China, especially due to the crisis with the Soviet Union.

On 2–3 August, Nixon visited Romania to meet with Ceaușescu and ask him to pass along the same message to Mao. Ceaușescu agreed to do so, and on 7 September, Romanian Prime Minister Ion Gheorghe Maurer, who was in Hanoi to attend the funeral of Ho Chi Minh, took Zhou aside to tell him that Nixon wanted an opening to China.

== Western border: Xinjiang (1969) ==
Tielieketi incident
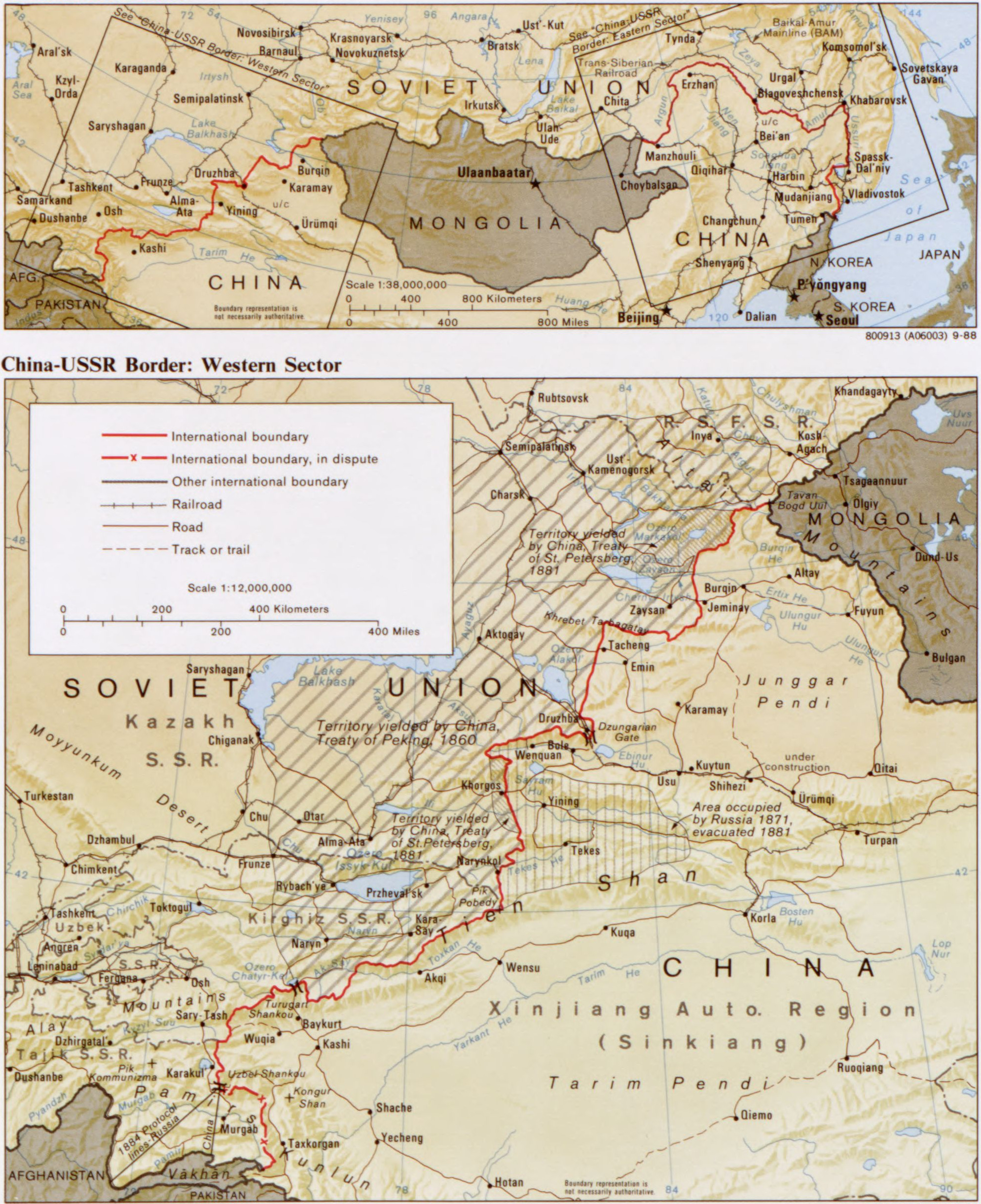
- Western part of the China-USSR border, 1988 map
Date	13 August 1969
Location	Tielieketi, Tacheng, Xinjiang
Result	Soviet victory
Territorial changes	None

Belligerents
China	Soviet Union

Commanders and leaders
Long Shujin; Fan Jinzhong; Pei Yingzhang	Vladimir Puchkov

Strength
100	300

Casualties and losses
28 killed; 1 captured; 40 wounded	2 killed; 10 wounded

=== Background ===
Soviet historiography, more specifically "Uyghur Studies," was increasingly politicized to match the tension of the Sino-Soviet split of the 1960s and the 1970s. One Soviet Turkologist, Tursun Rakhminov, who worked for the Soviet Communist Party, argued that the modern Uyghurs had founded the ancient Toquz Oghuz Country (744–840), the Kara-Khanid Khanate (840–1212), and so forth. The premodern states' wars against Chinese dynasties were cast as struggles for national liberation by the Uyghur ethnic group. Soviet historiography was not consistent on those issues; when Sino-Soviet relations were warmer, for example, the Three Districts Revolution was portrayed by Soviet historians as part of opposition to the Kuomintang during the Chinese Civil War, not as an anti-Chinese bid for national liberation. The Soviets also encouraged migration of Uyghurs to its territory in Kazakhstan, along the 4,380 km (2,738 mi) border. In May 1962, 60,000 Uyghurs from Xinjiang Province crossed the frontier into the Soviet Union to flee the famine and economic chaos of the Great Leap Forward.

=== Xinjiang clashes ===
On 10 June, 50 Soviet soldiers attacked Chinese forces in Xinjiang. On 13 August, approximately 300 Soviet soldiers supported by tanks and two helicopters attacked and defeated Chinese forces in Tielieketi. The heightened tensions raised the prospect of an all-out nuclear exchange between China and the Soviet Union. As in February, the clashes sparked a renewed increase in reconnaissance satellite launches, with an acceleration after the 10 June combat, and four launched in the three weeks following the 13 August attack.

== Ho Chi Minh's funeral ==
The decisive event that stopped the crisis from escalating into all-out war was the death of Ho Chi Minh on 2 September 1969. His funeral was attended by both Zhou and Kosygin, albeit at different times. Zhou flew out of Hanoi to avoid being in the same room as Kosygin. The possibility of North Vietnam's leading supporters going to war with each other alarmed the North Vietnamese. During the funeral, messages were exchanged between the Soviets and the Chinese via the North Vietnamese. Meanwhile, Nixon's message via Maurer had reached the Chinese, and it was decided in Beijing to "whet the appetite of the Americans" by making China appear stronger.

Zhou argued that a war with the Soviets would weaken China's hand towards the United States. The Chinese were more interested in the possibility of a rapprochement with the United States as a way of acquiring Taiwan than in having the United States ally with them against the Soviet Union. After Kosygin had attended Ho's funeral, the airplane taking him back to Moscow was denied permission to use Chinese air space, which forced it to land for refuelling in Calcutta. In India, Kosygin received the message via the Indian government that the Chinese were willing to discuss peace, which caused him to fly back to Beijing instead.

== Assessment ==
=== State of near war ===
In the early 1960s, the United States had "probed" the level of Soviet interest in joint action against Chinese nuclear weapons facilities; the Soviets were only willing to persuade China to sign the Partial Test Ban Treaty of 1963. Now the Soviets probed what the US reaction would be if the Soviets attacked the facilities. Whether this was part of an attempt to intimidate China, a real Soviet contingency plan, or both is unclear, but the Soviets approached other foreign governments, and the leadership of Communist parties in several countries; the intention was likely to have them communicate the Soviet nuclear threat to China. Noting that "neither side wishes the inflamed border situation to get out of hand", the Central Intelligence Agency (CIA) in August 1969 described the conflict as having "explosive potential" in the President's Daily Briefing. The agency stated that "the potential for a war between them clearly exists", including a Soviet attack on Chinese nuclear facilities, and China "appears to view the USSR as its most immediate enemy". Allen S. Whiting suggested that the Soviets might feel forced to use tactical nuclear weapons against Chinese human wave attacks after a strike on nuclear facilities.

The Chinese did not believe that a Soviet nuclear attack was likely until 27 August, when CIA director Richard Helms announced that the Soviets had asked foreign governments what their reaction would be to a preemptive attack on China. Although Helms did not include the Soviet probe to the US in the announcement, to China the announcement meant that the US took the Soviet probes seriously, so the threat of an imminent Soviet attack must be real. The United States took steps to ready its nuclear bombers.

These steps surprised Mao and prompted Chinese leaders to evacuate Beijing. China sought to reduce the tension and engaged with the Soviet side during Ho Chi Minh's funeral. On 11 September, Kosygin, on his way back from the funeral of Ho Chi Minh, stopped over in Beijing for talks with his Chinese counterpart, Zhou. Symbolic of the frosty relations between the two communist countries, the talks were held at Beijing Airport. Both agreed to return ambassadors who had been recalled and to begin border negotiations. On 23 and 29 September 1969, China conducted two unannounced nuclear weapons tests, with the second one a 3 MT thermonuclear device, to verify its nuclear strike capacity.

=== Possible reasons for attack ===
The interpretation of the reasoning and consequences of the conflict differs. Western historians believe that the events at Zhenbao Island and the subsequent border clashes in Xinjiang were caused mainly by Mao's use of Chinese local military superiority to satisfy domestic political imperatives in 1969. Yang Kuisong concludes that "the [Sino-Soviet] military clashes were primarily the result of Mao Zedong's domestic mobilization strategies, connected to his worries about the development of the Cultural Revolution."

Russian historians point out that the consequences of the conflict stem directly from a Chinese desire to take a leading role in the world and to strengthen ties with the United States. According to the 2004 Russian documentary film, Damansky Island Year 1969, Mao sought to elevate his country from the world's periphery and to place it at the centre of world politics. Other analysts state that the Chinese intended their attack on Zhenbao to deter future Soviet invasions by demonstrating that China could not be "bullied".

=== Result ===
Most scholars and analysts describe this conflict to have resulted in a Soviet victory, because the conflict was not over what a final border deal between the USSR and China would look like. Instead, it concerned whether they would hold talks over the border at all. The outcome favored the USSR as China unwillingly submitted to negotiations over the border. The conflict ended on 20 October 1969 after the Chinese agreed with regards to negotiations over the border.

=== Aftermath ===
Seen against the background of the Strategic Arms Limitation Talks between Brezhnev and Nixon, the Damansky incident could serve the double purpose of undermining the Soviet image of a peace-loving country if the Soviets chose to respond by a massive military operation against the invaders. If they demonstrated Soviet weakness, the Chinese attack could have been left without response. The killing of Soviet servicemen on the border signaled to the US that China had graduated into high politics and was ready to talk.

After the conflict, the US showed interest in strengthening ties with the Chinese government by secretly sending Henry Kissinger to China for a meeting with Zhou in 1971, during the so-called Ping Pong Diplomacy. That paved the way for Nixon to visit China and meet with Mao in 1972.

Sino-Soviet relations remained sour after the conflict, despite the border talks, which began in 1969 and continued inconclusively for a decade. Domestically, the threat of war caused by the border clashes inaugurated a new stage in the Cultural Revolution: China's thorough militarization. The 9th National Congress of the Chinese Communist Party, held in the aftermath of the Zhenbao incident, confirmed Defense Minister Lin Biao as Mao's heir apparent. Following the events of 1969, the Soviets further increased their forces along the Sino-Soviet border and in the Mongolian People's Republic.

Overall, the Sino-Soviet confrontation, which reached its peak in 1969, paved the way to a profound transformation in the international political system.

== Border negotiations: 1990s–2000s ==
Serious border demarcation negotiations did not occur until shortly before the fall of the Soviet Union in 1991. The 1991 Sino–Soviet Border Agreement was witnessed by General Secretary of the Chinese Communist Party Jiang Zemin and General Secretary of the Communist Party of the Soviet Union Mikhail Gorbachev on May 16, 1991 during Jiang's official visit to the Soviet Union. In particular, both sides agreed that Zhenbao belonged to China. (Both sides claimed the island to be under their control at the time of the agreement.) On 17 October 1995, an agreement over the last 54-kilometre (34 mi) stretch of the border was reached, but the question of control over three islands in the Amur and Argun rivers was left to be settled later.

On 16 July 2001, Russia and China signed the 2001 Sino-Russian Treaty of Friendship. Article 9 of the treaty has similarities to NATO's Article 5 in that it commits both parties, when one is threatened, to "immediately hold contacts and consultations in order to eliminate such threats".

In a border agreement between Russia and China signed on 14 October 2003, the final dispute was resolved. China was granted control over Tarabarov Island (Yinlong Island), Zhenbao Island, and around 50% of Bolshoy Ussuriysky Island (Heixiazi Island), near Khabarovsk. The Standing Committee of the National People's Congress ratified the agreement for China on 27 April 2005, and the Russian Duma followed suit on 20 May. On 2 June, Foreign Minister of China, Li Zhaoxing and his Russian counterpart, Sergei Lavrov, exchanged the ratification documents from their respective governments.

On 21 July 2008, Chinese Foreign Minister Yang Jiechi and his Russian counterpart, Lavrov, signed an additional Sino-Russian Border Line Agreement, marking the acceptance of the demarcation of the eastern portion of the Chinese-Russian border in Beijing, China. An additional protocol with a map affiliated on the eastern part of the borders both countries share was signed. The agreement also includes the Chinese gain of ownership of Yinlong / Tarabarov Island and half of Heixiazi / Bolshoi Ussuriysky Island.

In the 21st century, the Chinese Communist Party's version of the conflict, which is present on many official Party websites, describes the events of March 1969 as a Soviet aggression against China.

== See also ==
- History of the Soviet Union (1964–1982)
- History of the People's Republic of China
- Foreign relations of China
- Soviet invasion of Xinjiang
- Islamic rebellion in Xinjiang (1937)
- Battle of Baitag Bogd
- Soviet–Japanese border conflicts
- Renaming of geographical objects in the Russian Far East

== Sources ==
- Goldstein, Lyle J. (2001). "Return to Zhenbao Island: Who Started Shooting and Why it Matters". The China Quarterly. 168: 985–97. doi:10.1017/S0009443901000572. S2CID 153798597.
- Goldstein, Lyle (Spring 2003). "Do Nascent WMD Arsenals Deter? The Sino-Soviet Crisis of 1969". Political Science Quarterly. 118 (1): 53–80. doi:10.1002/j.1538-165X.2003.tb00386.x.
- Yang, Kuisong (2000). "The Sino-Soviet Border Clash of 1969: From Zhenbao Island to Sino-American Rapprochement". Cold War History. 1: 21–52. doi:10.1080/713999906. S2CID 155018048.
- Lüthi, Lorenz (June 2012). "Restoring Chaos to History: Sino-Soviet-American Relations, 1969". The China Quarterly. 210: 378–398. doi:10.1017/S030574101200046X. S2CID 154455199.
- Rea, Kenneth (September 1975). "Peking and the Brezhnev Doctrine". Asian Affairs. 3 (1): 22–30. doi:10.1080/00927678.1975.10554159.
- Robinson, Thomas W. (1972). "The Sino-Soviet Border Dispute: Background, Development, and the March 1969 Clashes". American Political Science Review. 66 (4): 1175–1202. doi:10.2307/1957173. JSTOR 1957173. S2CID 147383804.
