= Third Field Army =

- Active: 1949 to 1950
- Country: Republic of China; People's Republic of China
- Allegiance: Chinese Communist Party
- Branch: People's Liberation Army
- Type: Light infantry
- Size: 825,000 troops
- Garrison/HQ: Central Military Commission of the Chinese Communist Party
- March: Eighth Route Army March
- Equipment: Chiang Kai-shek rifle Hanyang 88; Type 38 rifle Type 41 75 mm mountain gun Mauser C96; Thompson submachine gun M3 submachine gun
- Engagements: Second Sino-Japanese War; Chinese Civil War

Commanders
- Ceremonial chief: Chairman of the Central Military Commission
- Notable commanders: Marshal Chen Yi; General Su Yu

Insignia
- Armband: Liberation Army emblem

The Third Field Army was one of the five main forces of the Chinese Communist Party's People's Liberation Army during the Chinese Civil War. It was established in early 1949. Initially known as the East China Field Army, it was formed by the New Fourth Army and the Eighth Route Army troops stationed in Shandong Province, a gradual adaptation of the expansion.

It took control of the troops in eastern China, with Chen Yi as its commander. It comprised the 7th, 8th, 9th, and 10th Armies plus the headquarters of the special technical troops, with a total of 580,000 men.

Forces associated with the Third Field Army included:

- The 7th Army, Commander Wang Jian'an, political commissar Tan Qilong, chief of staff Li Yingxi:
  - 21st Corps (including 61, 62, 63rd Divisions), commander Teng Haiqing, political commissar Kang Zhiqiang
  - 22nd Corps (including the 64th, 65th, 66th Divisions), commander Sun Jixian, political commissar Ding Qiusheng
  - 23rd Corps (including 67th, 68th, 69th Divisions), commander Tao Yong, political commissar Lu Sheng
  - 35th Corps (including 103, 104, 105th Divisions), commander Wu Huawen, political commissar He Kexi
- The 8th Army, Commander Chen Shiju, political commissar Yuan Zhongxian, chief of staff He Yixiang
  - 24th Corps (including the 70, 71, 72 Divisions), commander Wang Bicheng, political commissar Liao Haiguang
  - 25th Corps (including the 73rd, 74th and 75th divisions), commander Cheng Jun, political commissar Huang Huoxing
  - 26th Corps (including 76, 77, 78th Divisions), commander Zhang Renchu, political commissar Wang Yiping
  - 34th Corps (including the first 100, 101, 102 Divisions), commander He Jifeng, political commissar Zhao Qimin
- The 9th Army, Commander Song Shilun, political commissar Guo Huaruo, chief of staff Qin Jian
  - 20th Corps (including 58, 59, 60th Divisions), commander Liu Fei, political commissar Chen Shifu
  - 27th Corps (including the 79, 80, 81 divisions), commander Nie Fengzhi, political commissar Liu Haotian
  - 30th Army(including 88, 89, 90th Divisions), commander Xie Zhenhua, political commissar Li Ganhui
  - 33rd Army (including the 97th, 98th, 99th Divisions), commander Zhang Kexia, political commissar Han Nianlong
- The 10th Army, Commander Ye Fei, political commissar Wei Guoqing, Chief of Staff Chen Qingxian
  - 28th Corps (including the 82nd, 83rd, 84th Divisions), commander Zhu Shaoqing
  - 29th Corps (including 85, 86, 87th Divisions), commander Hu Bingyun, political commissar Zhang Fan
  - 31st Corps (including 91st, 92, 93rd Divisions), commander Zhou Zhijian, political commissar Chen Huatang
- Directly under the jurisdiction of Third Field Army
  - 32nd Corps (including the 94th Division, 95th Division), commander Tan Xilin, political commissar Peng Lin
  - Special forces column, commander Chen Ruiting, political commissar Zhang Kai
  - Guangdong-Guangxi Column (March 1947 - March 1949), commander Zeng Sheng, political commissar Lei Jingtian

In August 1950 the force was redesignated the East China Military Region.
