= Shanghai Campaign =

1949 Chinese military campaign

- Part of Chinese Civil War
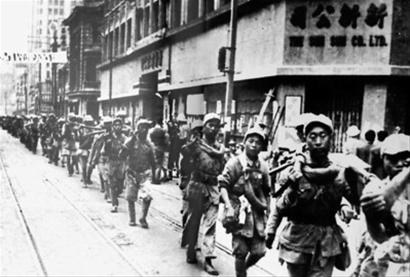
- People's Liberation Army troops on Nanjing Road, Shanghai, on May 23, 1949
Date	May 12, 1949 – June 2, 1949 (3 weeks)
Location	Shanghai, Republic of China
Result	Communist victory

Belligerents
(Republic of China (1912–1949)) Republic of China	Chinese Communist Party

Commanders and leaders
Tang Enbo; Liu Yuzhang; Liu Changyi (surrendered); Chou Tse-jou; Fang Chih	Chen Yi; Su Yu

Units involved
Republic of China Army: 21st Army; 51st Army; 52nd Army; 54th Army; 75th Army; 123rd Army; 12th Army; 35th Army; Nanking-Shanghai Garrison Corps	People's Liberation Army: The 20th Army of the IX Corps; The 23rd Army of the VII Corps; The 25th Army of the VIII Corps; The 26th Army of the X Corps; The 27th Army of the IX Corps; The 28th Army of the X Corps; The 29th Army of the X Corps; The 30th Army of the IX Corps; The 31st Army of the IX Corps; The 33rd Army of the X Corps; The Artillery Column

Strength
210,000	290,000

Casualties and losses
153,000 (included those who surrendered and defected)	34,000 (8,000 killed; 24,122 wounded; 1,951 missing)

The Shanghai Campaign was a series of battles fought between the nationalists and the Chinese Communist Party (CCP) in 1949 for the control of Shanghai, the largest city in China in the latter stage of the Chinese Civil War, and resulted in the city being taken over by the communists, who enjoyed numerical superiority.

== Prelude ==
With a population of six million, Shanghai was the largest city in China in 1949 and provided around a third of the total GDP of China by that time.

== Defending force: the nationalist strategy ==
The nationalist commander divided the city into two sectors along the Huangpu River. The western half of the city and the surrounding regions including Taicang, Kunshan, Jiaxing, and Golden Mountain Jinshan, were defended by a total of 20 divisions (including all of the armored force) belonging to the 21st Army, the 51st Army, the 52nd Army, the 54th Army, the 75th Army and the 123rd Army. The 12th Army and the 35th Army totaled five divisions and the naval and air assets were tasked to defend Pudong, with emphasis on regions included Wusong, Yuepu (月浦), Yanghang (杨行), Liuhang (刘行), Dachang (大场), Gaohang (高行), and Gaoqiao, in order to secure the escape route via sea. The nationalist force defending the city totaled more than 210,000. The buildings in the city were perfect defending positions which were further boosted by large amount of the concrete bunkers built.

== Attacking force: the communist strategy ==
The PLA 3rd Field Army under the commander-in-chief Chen Yi and deputy commander-in-chief Su Yu was tasked to take the city. The communists massed more than 290,000 troops totaled 10 armies to attack the city, while the communist 2nd Field Army under the commander-in-chief Liu Bocheng and political commissar Deng Xiaoping massed at Jinhua and Dongxiang (东乡) via Zhejiang-Jiangxi railway, in order to prevent any foreign intervention that never came. The primary goal of the communists was to take the city with minimal damage to the city and minimal civilian casualties, so that future reconstruction would be easy by utilizing the existing infrastructure and skilled labor force. To prevent the defenders from transferring large amount of wealth via sea, a pincer movement would be launched from both the east and west, targeting Wusong, so that the defenders' escape route via sea would be cut and the city would be attacked afterward and by isolating the defenders into separate pockets, and then the city would be taken by decimating the isolated defenders.

One prong of the communist pincer movement included the 26th Army, the 28th Army, the 29th Army, the 33rd Army of the communist X Corps and a part of the communist Artillery Column attacking from Changshu and Suzhou toward Kunshan, Taicang, and Jiading, eventually reaching Wusong, thus blocking off the defenders' escape route via sea by cutting off the traffic of Huangpu River. Afterward, this prong of the pincer movement would attack the city from northwest.

The other prong of the communist pincer movement included the 20th Army, the 27th Army, 30th Army, and the 31st Army of the communist IX Corps and a part of communist Artillery Column. Two armies would attack from Nanxun and Wujiang, toward Fengxian, Nanhui, Chuansha regions near/in Pudong, helping the communist X Corps to blockade the Wusong after approaching Gaoqiao. Another two armies would group at the regions south of Songjiang and east of Jiaxing, taking Qingpu when the situation permitted, and then attack the city from the east, south and west.

In case of the defenders were successful in transferring materials away from the city, the attackers also prepared large amount of food and coal for the civilian population, and over 5,000 communist civilian cadres were also drafted to take over the administrative functions after the city was taken.

== Order of battle ==
Defenders: Republic of China Armed Forces order of battle:

- The 21st Army
- The 51st Army
- The 52nd Army
- The 54th Army
- The 75th Army
- The 123rd Army
- The 12th Army
- The 35th Army
- The 1st Naval District
- Air Force units
- 5 Traffic Police Divisions

Attackers: People's Liberation Army order of battle:

- The 20th Army of the IX Corps
- The 23rd Army of the VII Corps
- The 25th Army of the VIII Corps
- The 26th Army of the X Corps
- The 27th Army of the IX Corps
- The 28th Army of the X Corps
- The 29th Army of the X Corps
- The 30th Army of the IX Corps
- The 31st Army of the IX Corps
- The 33rd Army of the X Corps
- The Artillery Column

== First stage ==
The campaign began on May 12, 1949, when the planned assaults on the outer defense perimeters of the city had begun. Two days later, the communist IX Corps succeeded in taking regions included Pinghu, Jinshanwei (金山卫), Fengxian, Nanhui, Qingpu, Songjiang, threatened the flank of the defenders at Chuansha. The nationalist 51st Army was forced to be redeployed from the city to strengthen the defense of Bailonggang (白龙港), Lin's Family's Pier (Linjia Matou, 林家码头) and other positions at outer defensive zones. Meanwhile, the communist X Corps succeeded in taking Taicang, Kunshan, Jiading, and Liuhe, and continued their attack on Yuepu, Yanghang, and Liuhang. However, from their concrete bunkers and with the help of naval and air support, the defenders held on and when the nationalist 99th Division of the 21st Army was redeployed from the city to Yuepu, Yanghang, and Liuhang for reinforcement, the defenders was able to beat back the attackers.

After the setback, the Communists adjusted their tactic by adopting small formations to take one bunker at a time, and with the rapid utilization of the experienced gained in fighting against the fortified positions consisted of concrete bunkers, the speed of attack was greatly accelerated. By May 19, 1949, the communist X Corps had managed to take Yuepu and the International Broadcasting Station, and annihilated the defenders stationed at Liuhang. Meanwhile, the communist IX Corps had managed to take Zhoupu (周浦) and Chuansha, and completely annihilated the nationalist 51st Army defending Bailonggang, and isolated the nationalist 12th Army at Gaoqiao, while cutting off the links between the nationalist 37 Army at Pudong with other nationalist units via land.

== Second stage ==
To secure the escape route via sea, the nationalist 75th Army was redeployed from the city to reinforce Gaoqiao, but after two armies and a division were withdrawn from the city to reinforce the positions of outer defensive perimeters, there was not enough force within the city to suppress the civilians who vehemently opposed the destruction of the city and organized themselves to protect infrastructure facilities within the city. As a result, the nationalist plan of destroying the city and transferring the wealth was not carried out fully as it had planned. The defenders' naval assets also faced great difficulties in that it was forced to fight on the attacker's turf: the inland riverine navigational channels were simply too narrow for the naval vessels to maneuver and they become sitting ducks for the communist's long range shore batteries. After many extraordinarily brave but completely futile engagements by the outgunned nationalist naval assets which resulted in seven nationalist naval vessels damaged, it was painfully obvious that the naval asset must withdraw in the hopeless fights. When the nationalist naval fleet was forced to withdraw on May 23, 1949, the communist's attempt to cut off the defenders' maritime escape route succeeded, and the sea to the east of Gaoqiao was blockaded by the PLA.

After ten days of fierce fighting, the defenders suffered more than 20,000 casualties and lost all of the positions in the outer defensive perimeters. However, this might not be a bad thing because the defenders were able to concentrate their force in the city. The attacking army was well aware of this situation and adjusted their tactic once again: the 23rd Army of the communist VII Corps and the 25th Army of the communist VIII Corps were assigned to help the communist IX Corps and X Corps to take the city.

== Third stage ==
The assault on the city begun at the night of May 23, 1949 when the communist 29th Army took the high ground in the southern suburb under the cover of darkness, while the communist 28th Army penetrated to Wusong and shelled the pier. On May 24, 1949, the communist 20th Army took Pudong and the communist 27th Army took the train station at Xujiahui and Hongqiao. The nationalist commander-in-chief, Tang Enbo already boarded naval ships on May 18, 1949, realized the inevitable and in order to strengthen the defense around the pier at Wusong, ordered the surviving 6th Division of the nationalist 75th Army at Gaoqiao to withdraw to Yuepu, and the nationalist units north of Suzhou Creek to withdraw to Wusong, for the preparation to withdraw via sea.

Under the cover of darkness, the communist 23rd Army and the 27th Army penetrated the city from Xujiahui and Longhua respectively while the communist 20th Army crossed the Huangpu River at Gaochangmiao (高昌庙) and by the dawn of May 25, 1949, everything south of the Suzhou Creek was firmly under the communist control. The communist's offensive continued during the day with the communist 26th Army took Dachang and Jiangwan, and the communist 25th Army and the 29th Army took Wusong and Baoshan, while the communist 28th Army and the 33rd Army took Yanghang. At night, the communist 27th Army, 23rd Army and a portion of the 20th Army crossed the Suzhou Creek under the cover of darkness, and regions north of the creek fell into the attackers' hands. The deputy commander of the Shanghai defense, the commander of the Shanghai garrison, General Liu Changyi (刘昌义) was forced to surrender.

At the night of May 25, 1949, the communist 31st Army took Gaoqiao with the help of the communist 30th Army after fierce battle, and by the noon of May 26, 1949, the last defense in Pudong was wiped out. By May 27, 1949, the city had fallen into the communist control. Soon afterward, the communist 25th Army launched its assault on Chongming Island and badly mauled the defending force, and by June 2, 1949, the campaign had ended with the communist victory completed.

== Outcome ==
The campaign had cost the city's defenders heavily. 50,000 defenders including the nationalist commander-in-chief Tang Enbo managed to escape via sea, but the entire 37th Army, the 51st Army and the 5 Traffic Police Divisions were defeated, while the nationalist 12th Army, 21st Army, 52nd Army, 75th Army, and the 123rd Army were badly mauled. Total nationalist casualties numbered more than 153,000. In addition to the city, more than 1,370 artillery pieces of various caliber, 1,161 automobiles, 11 naval vessels and 119 tanks and armored vehicles were captured intact.

Another mistake committed by the nationalists was strategic in nature: spending too many resources defending a political symbol instead of focusing on evacuating the city and transferring the wealth. Much of the nationalists’ military resources were spent at Shanghai, leaving other regions vulnerable, and the communist VII Corps was able to take advantage by seizing Ningbo and Wenzhou during the campaign. As a result, not only was the city lost to the communists in a relatively intact state, along with a great portion of its wealth, but many other surrounding regions also fell, enriching the communist forces.

The Communist entry into Shanghai was warmly received. Communist forces were ordered to disturb the city as little as possible, and soldiers slept on the streets rather than disturb people in their homes. Employees of the Central Bank of China placed posters stating: "Confiscate the properties of the privileged families and bureaucratic capitalists!" on the walls of the building. Administrative function began to return to normal on the third day of the city's capture, with 300 truckloads of political workers and officials entering into Shanghai to take over industrial, financial and telecommunications services.

== See also ==
- Outline of the Chinese Civil War
- National Revolutionary Army
- History of the People's Liberation Army
