= 1st Independent Division of Jiangsu Provincial Military District (1st Formation) =

Independent Division of Jiangsu Provincial Military District (1964–66) 1st Independent Division of Jiangsu Provincial Military District (1966–75)
- Active: 1964.12 - 1975.4
- Country: People's Republic of China
- Branch: People's Liberation Army
- Type: Division
- Role: Infantry
- Garrison/HQ: Nantong, Jiangsu province

Independent Division of Jiangsu Provincial Military District (Chinese: 江苏省军区独立师)(1st Formation) was formed on December 26, 1964, from the 539th Infantry Regiment of the disbanding 180th Army Division. The division was then composed of 3 infantry regiments (1st to 3rd) and a machine-gun artillery battalion.

From 1965 the division HQ stationed at Zhenjiang, Jiangsu province.

In September 1966, the division was renamed as 1st Independent Division of Jiangsu Provincial Military District (Chinese: 江苏省军区独立第1师) following 2nd Independent Division of Jiangsu Provincial Military District's formation.

In March 1968, 70th and 75th Garrison Regiment was attached to the division, and the division was attached to 60th Army Corps.

In October 1969, 105th Infantry Regiment of 181st Army Division was attached to the division, and the divisional HQ moved to Binhai for coastal defense mission of Lianyungang. Machine-gun Artillery Battalion was expanded to Artillery Regiment.

In April 1970 the division was transferred to Jiangsu Provincial Military District's control, while 70th and 75th Garrison Regiments detached.

On March 25, 1975, the division was inactivated and became Wenzhou Military Sub-district.
