= 178th Division =

178th Division may refer to:

- 178th Division (1st Formation) (People's Republic of China), 1949–1952
- 178th Division (2nd Formation) (People's Republic of China), 1967–1985
- 178th Rifle Division, Soviet Union

== See also ==
- List of military divisions by number
- 178th Regiment (disambiguation)
- 178th (disambiguation)
