= 181st Armed Police Division =

Military Formation of the Peoples Armed Police of the People's Republic of China

181st Division (1949–53) 181st Infantry Division (1953–60) 181st Army Division (1960–69) 180th Army Division (1969-85) 181st Army Division (1985) 181st Infantry Division (1985-96) 181st Armed Police Division (1996-2017)
- Active: 1949.2 - 2017
- Country: People's Republic of China
- Branch: People's Armed Police
- Type: Division
- Role: Gendarmerie; Rapid Reaction Force
- Nickname: Pi's Brigade
- Engagements: Chinese Civil War; Korean War; Vietnam War; 2008 Sichuan earthquake relief efforts; July 2009 Ürümqi riots

Commanders
- Notable commanders: Pi Dingjun

The 181st Division (Chinese: 第181师) is a military formation of the People's Armed Police of the People's Republic of China. It was created in February 1949 under the Regulation of the Redesignations of All Organizations and Units of the Army, issued by Central Military Commission on November 1, 1948, basing on the 37th Brigade, 13th Column of the Huabei Military Region Field Force. Its history could be traced to the Yuxi Independent Anti-Japanese Detachment of the Eighth Route Army in Western Anhui, which was formed by the 3rd and 35th Regiments of the Taihang Military Region, activated September 6, 1944.

During the Sino-Japanese War and the Chinese Civil War, the unit was made famous for its commander, Pi Dingjun(Chinese: 皮定均) and obtained the nickname of "Pi's Brigade"(Chinese: 皮旅). It was the only unit that was combat effective after the obliteration of the Central Plains Liberated Area in late 1945.

The division was part of 61st Corps. Under the flag of the 181st division, it took part in many major battles in the Chinese Civil War, including the Menglianggu Campaign, Linfen Campaign, Jinzhong Campaign, and Taiyuan Campaign.

The division was composed of the 541st, 542nd, and 543rd regiments as of its formation.

In November 1950, the division was transferred to 60th Corps's control following the 61st Corps' disbandment.

In March 1951, the division was transferred to the 60th Corps and served in the Korean War as a part of the People's Volunteer Army.

In September 1953, the division left Korea and returned to China. During its deployment, it allegedly inflicted 16,754 casualties on the confronting UN Forces.

The division was then garrisoned in Chu County, Anhui Province.

In November 1953, the 587th Artillery Regiment was activated and attached to the division.

In 1954 it served as an exercise and demonstration formation.

In February 1955, the 283rd Tank Self-Propelled Artillery Regiment was attached to the division from the 78th Infantry Division, now reconstituted into a coastal defense unit.

From April 1960, the division was renamed as the 181st Army Division(Chinese: 陆军第181师) and became a showcase unit for foreign delegations. By then the division was composed of:

- 541st Regiment
- 542nd Regiment
- 543rd Regiment
- 587th Artillery Regiment
- 283rd Tank Self-Propelled Artillery Regiment

In February 1961, the 283rd Tank Self-Propelled Artillery Regiment detached from the division to join the 179th Army Division.

In December 1964, 538th Regiment was attached to the division from the disbanding 180th Army Division.

From May 1967 to January 1968, Anti-Aircraft Artillery Battalion, 181st Army Division was deployed to the North Vietnam to defend against US air campaigns. The battalion participated in 12 engagements with no alleged kills.

In July 1967, 538th Regiment detached from the division to join the newly activated 178th Army Division.

In February, 105th Regiment was attached to the division.

In August 1969, 587th Artillery Regiment was renamed the Artillery Regiment, Army 181st Division.

On October 10, 1969, 105th Regiment detached from the division to join the 1st Independent Division of Jiangsu Provincial Military District.

On December 8, 1969, the division was redesignated as the 180th Army Division(Chinese: 陆军第180师). All its regiments were then redesignated:

- 541st Regiment was redesignated as the 538th Regiment;
- 542nd Regiment was redesignated as the 539th Regiment;
- 543rd Regiment was redesignated as the 540th Regiment.

In January 1985, the division was redesignated as the 181st Army Division(Chinese: 陆军第181师). All its regiments were then redesignated:

- 538th Regiment was redesignated as the 541st Regiment;
- 539th Regiment was redesignated as the 542nd Regiment;
- 540th Regiment was redesignated as the 543rd Regiment.

In September 1985, the division was redesignated as the 181st Infantry Division(Chinese: 步兵第181师) and reconstituted as a northern infantry division, category B. The division was transferred to the 1st Army following 60th Army Corps' disbandment.

The division was then composed of:

- 541st Infantry Regiment
- 542nd Infantry Regiment
- 543rd Infantry Regiment
- Artillery Regiment

In 1996 the division was transferred to the People's Armed Police' control and reconstituted as the 181st Armed Police Division(Chinese: 武警第181师). The division was then composed of:

- 541st Armed Police Regiment
- 542nd Armed Police Regiment
- 543rd Armed Police Regiment
- 711th Armed Police Regiment

In 2008 the division was deployed to Sichuan to assist with relief efforts after the 2008 Sichuan earthquake.

On 8 July 2009 the division was deployed to Ürümqi to deal with the July 2009 Ürümqi riots.

In 2017, the division was deactivated along with other PAP mobile divisions and merged into the 2nd Mobile Contingent.
