= Typhoon Fred =

Pacific typhoon in 1994

Typhoon Fred (Susang)
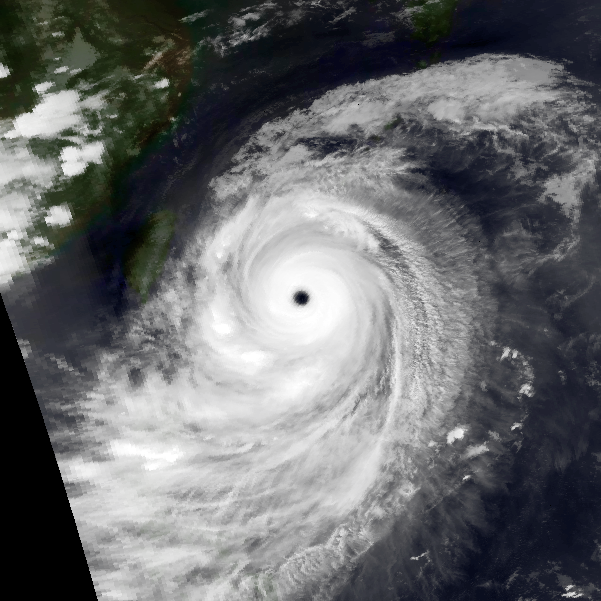
- Fred at peak intensity on August 19

Meteorological history
- Formed: August 14, 1994
- Remnant low: August 22, 1994
- Dissipated: August 26, 1994

Very strong typhoon
- 10-minute sustained (JMA)
- Highest winds: 185 km/h (115 mph)
- Lowest pressure: 925 hPa (mbar); 27.32 inHg

Category 4-equivalent super typhoon
- 1-minute sustained (SSHWS/JTWC)
- Highest winds: 240 km/h (150 mph)
- Lowest pressure: 910 hPa (mbar); 26.87 inHg

Overall effects
- Fatalities: 3,063 total
- Damage: $1.19 billion (1994 USD)
- Areas affected: Taiwan; Japan; China
- IBTrACS
- Part of the 1994 Pacific typhoon season

Typhoon Fred, known in the Philippines as Super Typhoon Susang, was a powerful tropical cyclone that caused extensive damage in southeastern China in mid-August 1994. Regarded as the worst typhoon to affect Zhejiang in 160 years, it originated as an area of disturbed weather over the open West Pacific on August 13. The system moved west-southwest and developed into a tropical depression on August 14. Early on August 15, it intensified into a tropical storm. Fred intensified at a steady rate over the course of several days while moving toward the west. The storm intensified into a typhoon on August 16 and into a super typhoon three days later. Late on August 19, the Japan Meteorological Agency (JMA), the principal organization in the West Pacific, estimated 10-minute sustained winds of 185 km/h (115 mph). The Joint Typhoon Warning Center (JTWC), meanwhile, assessed 1-minute sustained winds of 240 km/h (150 mph). After peaking in intensity, Fred veered to the north of Taiwan and struck the China mainland near Wenzhou early on August 21. The system degraded once inland and dissipated near Wuhan on August 22.

As Fred moved between Taiwan and Japan, it produced fringe effects in both countries. In Japan, heavy rainfall and strong winds caused damage to buildings and crops. This damage was exacerbated by an F2 tornado that injured 14 people. In Taiwan, severe weather left thousands without utilities and caused damage primarily to crops. A landslide killed three people, and two others went missing. The most significant impact by far occurred in southeastern China, particularly in Zhejiang Province. A significant storm surge combined with astronomical high tides to inflict catastrophic damage to coastal infrastructure. Protection mechanisms failed, allowing an overwhelming surge of water to flow into 189 towns, including the port city of Wenzhou.

In conjunction with flooding induced by swollen rivers, these floods impacted some 11 million people, of which 2.11 million were stranded by water. The combination of wind and rain damaged 700,000 homes and collapsed 100,000 more. Thousands of kilometers of electricity lines, embankment, and highway were damaged. Up to 300,000 ha (741,000 acres) of land were damaged, and some 367,000 livestock were killed. Along the storm path, 1,815 casualties were recorded, including 1,248 deaths, primarily focused on Zhejiang, totaling 3,063 deaths. The damage total reached $1.19 billion, almost all of which occurred in China.

== Meteorological history ==
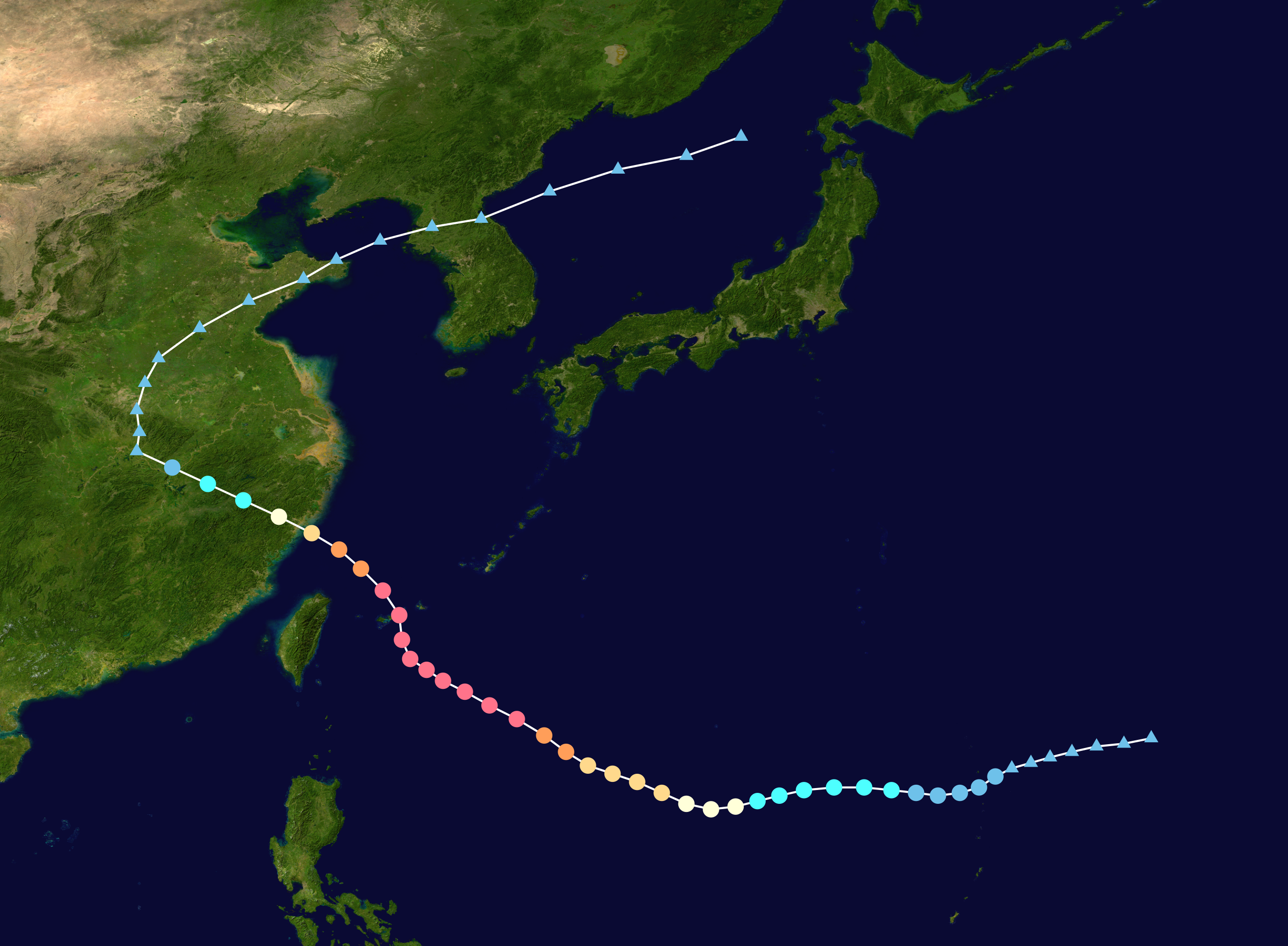
Map plotting the storm's track and intensity, according to the Saffir–Simpson scale Map key Saffir–Simpson scale Tropical depression (≤38 mph, ≤62 km/h) Tropical storm (39–73 mph, 63–118 km/h) Category 1 (74–95 mph, 119–153 km/h) Category 2 (96–110 mph, 154–177 km/h) Category 3 (111–129 mph, 178–208 km/h) Category 4 (130–156 mph, 209–251 km/h) Category 5 (≥157 mph, ≥252 km/h) Unknown Storm type Tropical cyclone Subtropical cyclone Extratropical cyclone, remnant low, tropical disturbance, or monsoon depression

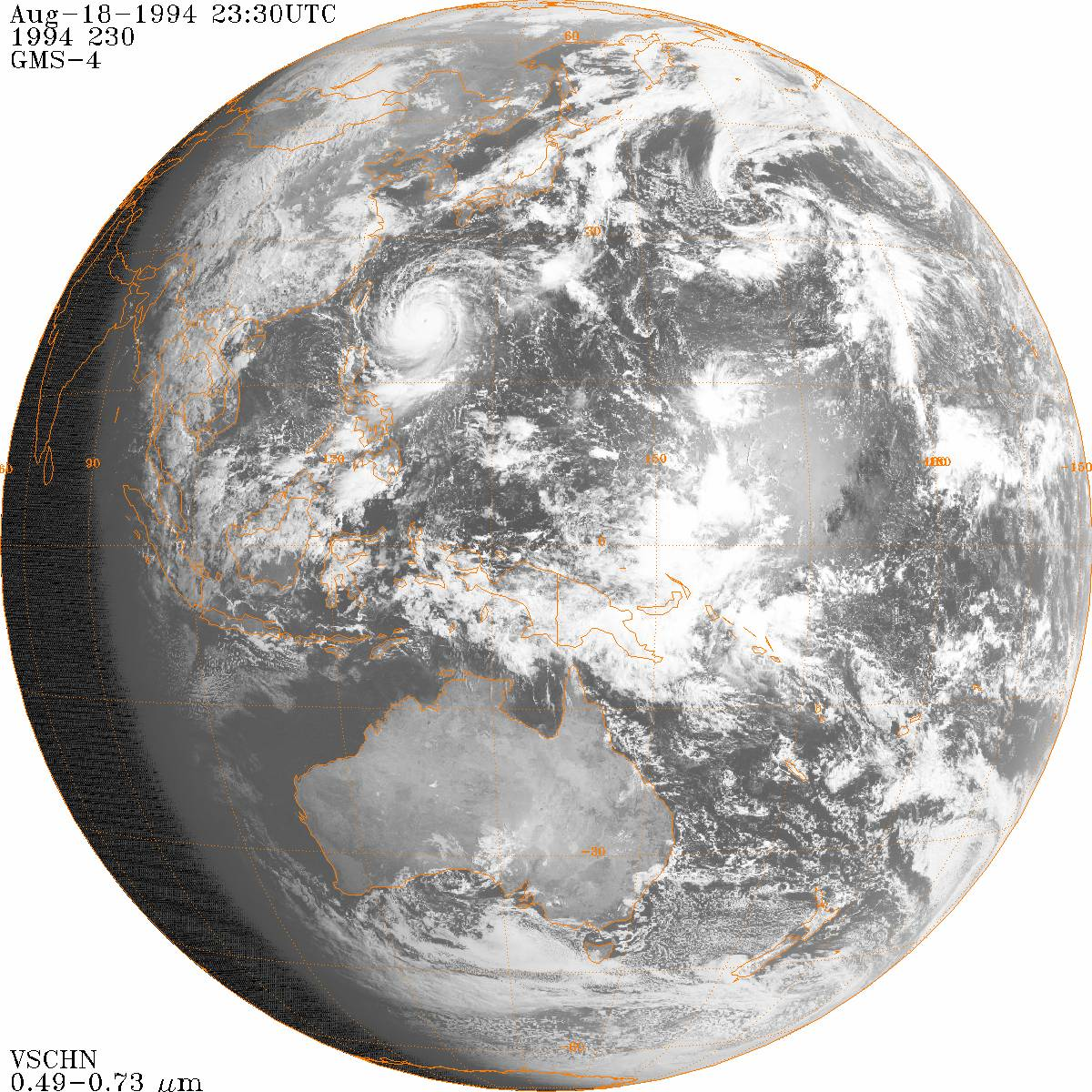
The Earth on August 19, with Super Typhoon Fred on the left.

At 06:00 UTC on August 13, the JTWC issued their first significant tropical weather advisory on a nascent area of disturbed weather over the open West Pacific basin. The system initially embarked on a west-southwest track, moving along the southern side of a mid-level subtropical ridge. At 00:00 UTC on August 14, the JMA began monitoring the system. Four hours later, the JTWC issued a Tropical Cyclone Formation Alert, which was followed by their first advisory on newly formed Tropical Depression 19W at 06:00 UTC. Owing to its continued development, the tropical depression was upgraded to Tropical Storm Fred by both the JMA and JTWC early on August 15.

Most super typhoons in the West Pacific undergo at least one period of rapid intensification to reach their high-end intensities. Fred, however, only steadily intensified along its path across the basin. A tropical upper-tropospheric trough moved in tandem to the north of the storm, although it is unclear what effect this feature may have had on the cyclone's strength. At 18:00 UTC on August 16, the JMA upgraded Fred to a typhoon, a move replicated by the JTWC later that night as the storm first developed an eye on a weather satellite. By late on August 19, Fred had further developed into a super typhoon. The JTWC estimated peak winds of 240 km/h (150 mph) and a minimum barometric pressure of 27.32 inHg (925 mb) at this time. The JMA, meanwhile, assigned 10-minute sustained winds of 185 km/h (115 mph).

As Fred intensified, its eye diameter did not shrink, a trait uncharacteristic compared to most typhoons. In fact, the size of its eye varied considerably, from as small as 21 km (13 mi) to as large as 71 km (44 mi) in diameter. The system's original course moved in the direction of Taiwan. While it was about 460 km (290 mi) southwest of Okinawa, however, Fred rapidly veered toward the north-northwest. As the system abruptly changed direction, it began to weaken quickly according to its shrinking eye on satellite and surface observations scattered throughout the southern Ryukyu Islands. However, this rate of weakening slowed as the typhoon made its final approach to the coastline of China. During the early hours of August 21, Fred made landfall about 20 km (12 mi) south-southeast of Wenzhou. It continued inland, weakening to a severe tropical storm early on August 22, and dissipating over the Yangtze River valley near Wuhan around 06:00 UTC that day. The remnants of the storm curved northeast in combination with an approaching weather front, and impacts from those systems reached Japan on August 26–27.

== Preparations and impact ==
=== Japan ===
Across the southern Ryukyu Islands of Japan, Fred produced heavy rain and strong winds on August 19–21. Precipitation was greatest on Ishigaki-jim, reaching 222 mm (8.7 in) in Kabira Bay and 211 mm (8.3 in) at Ishigaki Airport. On Miyako-jima, wind gusts reached 187 km/h (116 mph). The storm destroyed 6 power utility poles and 827 power lines, leaving 11,200 customers without service. An F2 tornado produced by the typhoon struck Irabu-jima on August 20, destroying 1 home, damaging 34 others, and injuring 14 people. The tornado was estimated to be no more than 150 m (490 ft) wide and traveled along a 8.5 km (5.3 mi) path. Damage throughout Miyako-jima reached ¥705.85 million. A minimum pressure of 27.73 inHg (939.1 mbar) was observed on Ishigaki-jima. Sustained winds on Iriomote-jima reached 116 km/h (72 mph) with gusts recorded at 175 km/h (109 mph) shortly before the anemometer failed. Across the island, two buildings were destroyed while seventeen others suffered extensive damage. Landslides blocked off two roads, creating traffic difficulties. Power outages affected 227 customers. Damage across Iriomote-jima amounted to ¥439.98 million, including agricultural damage that reached ¥388.24 million. A plume of moisture associated with the typhoon extended northeast toward another area of low pressure and led to locally heavy rainfall up to 252 mm (9.9 in) in Ibaraki Prefecture. Approximately, 100 buildings were affected by the floods, 1 of which was destroyed. The extratropical remnants of Fred brought heavy rain to Hokkaido on August 26–27. Rainfall of 96 mm (3.8 in) in Imakane caused flooding which damaged agricultural institutions. Losses reached ¥5.885 million in the Hiyama Subprefecture.

=== Taiwan ===
In advance of Typhoon Fred, some 130 illegal Chinese deckhands working on Taiwanese fishing boats were allowed to take shelter on the island. Prior to Fred, these workers – hired as cheap labor and harbored on floating hotels – were barred from entering Taiwan. However, following the deaths of several deckhands caused by a previous typhoon that capsized a ship offshore, these workers were allowed to seek refuge onshore. The cyclone's core remained north of the island, but Taiwan nonetheless felt peripheral effects from the storm. Along the coastline, maximum significant wave heights reached 7.59 m (24.9 ft). These waves induced a significant drop in phytoplankton along the northern coastline of Taiwan, disturbing coastal marine ecosystems. Across Taiwan, domestic air traffic was disrupted on the day of Fred's closest approach, but international air traffic, most rail, and most highway traffic remained minimally affected. Authorities in the northern portion of the country released water from reservoirs to prevent overflowing. This move followed a series of three typhoons that affected the region earlier in 1994, causing excessive flooding that left 20 people dead and $346 million in damage across the central and southern portions of Taiwan. Fred produced 180 mm (7.1 in) of rain across the northern sections of the island. The severe weather left 100,000 families without power and 21,000 households without telephone service. About NT$22 million in agricultural products were destroyed. Three people were killed when a landslide collapsed a portion of a highway; this was one of many landslides observed in the wake of the storm. Two people went missing, including a 17-year-old boy last seen at a pier in Taitung County. Another person was injured. The compounded effects of Fred and previous cyclones raised concerns that Taiwan's third quarter GDP growth would be negatively affected.

=== China ===
As the storm approached, the Zhejiang Provincial Military Command urged officers of the People's Liberation Army to be on full alert, and contingents began evacuating residents. Fred's arrival came after a series of devastating floods throughout Southern China killed over 4,000 people and caused $6.1 billion in damage over preceding months. The typhoon's effects were concentrated in the Zhejiang, Jiangsu, and Fujian provinces across the southeastern section of China, where Fred was described as the region's worst in 160 years and contributed to the most severe flooding across the southeastern provinces in 70 years. A total of 1,815 casualties were recorded, and 1,248 people were killed. Total damage reached $1.18 billion.

The vast majority of damage and death in association with the typhoon occurred across the Zhejiang Province. As Fred approached, it produced tidal waves up to 12 m (39 ft) which sunk 700 fishing vessels and damaged 900 more. This included a 1,000 ton fishing boat which was driven into a seawall. Storm surge associated with the storm combined with local high astronomical tides to produce a cascading failure of coastal infrastructure throughout the Zhejiang province. Within hours of the storm's landfall, nearly all first-tier seawalls collapsed, causing subsequent failure in second-tier seawalls and eventually third-tier seawalls as well. Over 520 km (320 mi) of dike was damaged, nearly half of which was destroyed. The overwhelming surge of water flowed into 189 towns. The floods moved through homes at night, when many people could not flee. As a result, 1,216 of the storm's deaths were concentrated in the Zhejiang province.

In the port city of Wenzhou, 3,370 embankments were broken, severing the city's power and water supply and disrupting travel by land, sea, and air. The waiting hall of the Wenzhou Longwan International Airport was flooded to a depth of 1.5 m (4.9 ft), and the building was shut down for at least 15 days due to the destruction of critical equipment. Furthermore, the combination of the surge and ongoing rainfall led to the overflowing of the Oujiang River, which soon consumed the fragile seawall that protected the most prosperous portions of Wenzhou. Tides in the affluent areas rose to 1.5–2.5 m (4.9–8.2 ft), causing additional, severe flood damage to homes and businesses. A ship washed into the city's roads. At the mouth of the Oujiang River, Lingkun, Jiangxin, and Qidu islands were submerged by a tide of 2–3 m (6.6–9.8 ft) above ground level and remained inundated until the next day. The floods prompted a shortage of vegetables throughout the city's market. Trees were downed, train tracks were cut off, and roads were washed out or covered by mudslides. Port facilities floated out to sea as significant erosion affected the coastline. The tide levels in Wenzhou and Rui'an exceeded historically measured high tides by 0.65 m (2.1 ft) and 0.21 m (0.69 ft), respectively. The tide level in the Longwan District peaked at a height estimated to occur every 200 years.

In total, Fred affected 48 counties, causing impact to over 11 million people. Up to 300,000 ha (741,000 acres) of land were damaged. Torrential rainfall, spread across four days and lasting up to 43 consecutive hours in some places, totaled to 678 mm (26.7 in). About 2.11 million people were stranded by floods, and an additional 56,000 people were evacuated. Wind gusts as measured in Yuhuan reached 179 km/h (111 mph). The combination of wind and flood laid waste to numerous structures, with 700,000 housing units damaged and an additional 100,000 units collapsed. The storm ruined about 141,130 ha (348,750 acres) of farmland. It damaged 4,681 km (2,909 mi) of electricity lines, 2,397 km (1,489 mi) of embankment, and 1,056 km (656 mi) of highway. In the Zhejiang province, about a quarter of its 42 million people were affected. Some 425 ha (1,050 acres) of fish farm were destroyed, and 367,000 heads of livestock were lost. Irrigation works were damaged. In the neighboring Jiangsu Province, trees were likewise toppled, electric poles were downed, and cotton fields were flattened in the cities of Shanghai and Suzhou.

In the aftermath of the storm, the Government of China did not immediately request international assistance. Instead, local and regional authorities organized shelter and provided food for victims. President Jiang Zemin and Premier Li Peng dispatched a delegation of high-ranking Chinese leaders to inspect damage and express sympathy to the victims of the storm. Special work teams began the process of restoring electricity, telephone, railway service, and overarching transport throughout the region. Soldiers assisted in rescue effort as well. The Red Cross Society of China distributed relief items and organized mobile medical teams. Residents lined up at the Huangshi Village to receive rice provided by the government. The Secretary of the Provincial Party Committee Li Zemin, and the former secretary Wang Siai, in addition to the mayor of the district, Chen Xiaohua, all toured damage in the Longwan District. The Chinese leader heading flood relief, Chen Junsheng, warned officials to be on alert for profiteering and looting. He also suggested improving health services to stave off outbreaks of cholera or dysentery.

Fred followed a series of significant weather disasters across China during the first six months of China. Combined, these events led to a 25 percent increase in market prices. Fearing that these price increases would disillusion the Chinese citizenry toward the objectives of the government, the country's government issued an urgent statement calling for measures to reduce the prices of vegetables, pork, and other foods as fears spread that a food scarcity in China would become a global issue. The Ministry of Agriculture in Beijing sought to minimize grain losses in particular, which had already suffered severe losses in preceding months as the worst drought in 60 years affected portions of China. The country pledged there would be no additional adjustments in the second half of the year following Fred. Despite efforts to quell uncertainty, the Chinese government nonetheless faced questions regarding its effectiveness following the catastrophes. While market-oriented reforms implemented by Deng Xiaoping boosted rural and urban prosperity alike, the dismantling of communes restricted the ease of constructing dams, dikes, and water irrigation channels, resulting in a steady degradation of rural infrastructure. The effects of overcrowding resulted in the construction of homes in flood prone areas. These moves amplified Fred's destructiveness.

== See also ==
- Typhoon Doug (1994)
- Typhoon Haitang (2005)
- Typhoon Haikui (2012)
