= 178th =

178th is the ordinal form of the number 178. 178th or One hundred and seventy-eighth may also refer to:

- A fraction, 1/178, equal to one of 178 equal parts

== Geography ==
- 178th meridian east, a line of longitude
- 178th meridian west, a line of longitude

== Military ==
- 178th (2/1st Nottinghamshire and Derbyshire) Brigade, British Army
- 178th Division (1st Formation) (People's Republic of China)
- 178th Division (2nd Formation) (People's Republic of China)
- 178th Rifle Division, Red Army
- 178th Regiment (disambiguation)

== See also ==
- June 27, 178th day of the year in a standard year
