= 179th Brigade =

179th Brigade may refer to:

- 179th Motorized Infantry Brigade (People's Republic of China)
- 179th (2/4th London) Brigade, United Kingdom
- 179th (Deptford) Brigade, Royal Field Artillery, United Kingdom

== See also ==
- 179th Regiment (disambiguation)
