= Chengdu campaign =

1949 campaign of the Chinese Civil War

- Part of the Cross-Strait conflict and Chinese Civil War
Date	December 11–27, 1949
Location	Chengdu, Sichuan Province
Result	Communists capture Chengdu

Belligerents
Republic of China	People's Republic of China

Commanders and leaders
(Taiwan) Hu Zongnan	(China) Liu Bocheng (China) Deng Xiaoping (China) He Long

Strength
ROCA 55th Division	180th Division of PLA 60th Army

The Chengdu campaign was the capture of Chengdu by the People's Republic of China (Communists) in December 1949 during the Chinese Civil War. The city was the national capital of the Republic of China (Nationalists) and provincial capital of the southwestern Chinese province of Sichuan. The campaign was the Southwestern China campaign, also considered part of the Campaign to Suppress Bandits in Southwestern China.

== Battle of Jianmenguan ==
Jianmen Pass (Jianmen Guan, 剑门关) is a key 50-meter wide mountain pass between Shaanxi and Sichuan. The ROC fortified the pass with bunkers during the Civil War in preparation for a PRC attack. The PRC captured nearby Guangyuan on December 14, 1949. The PRC's 540th Regiment (of 180th Division, 60th Army, 18th Army Group) was assigned to take the pass, which it reached after a 40 km three day forced march through the mountains. The initial attack destroyed a company of the defending ROC 55th Division. Two of the 540th Regiment's battalions approached under the cover of darkness to 50 meters of the pass 10:00 PM; the remaining battalion outflanked the defenses by moving through the mountains. The attackers crossed a final ravine with a log and overwhelmed the defenders. The PRC captured 300 prisoners.

The ROC retreated and abandoned Jiange in the afternoon of December 18, 1949. The way was cleared for the PRC to push deeper into Sichuan.

== See also ==
- National Revolutionary Army
- History of the People's Liberation Army
