= 179th Motorized Infantry Brigade =

179th Division (1949–53) 179th Infantry Division (1953–60) 179th Army Division (1960-85) 179th Infantry Division (1985-98) 179th Motorized Infantry Brigade(1998-2017) 179th Combined Arms Brigade
- Active: 1949.2 -
- Country: People's Republic of China
- Branch: People's Liberation Army, People's Volunteer Army
- Type: Brigade
- Role: Infantry
- Part of: 71st Group Army
- Nickname: Linfen Brigade
- Engagements: Chinese Civil War, Korean War

Commanders
- Notable commanders: Chen Bingde

The 179th Division (Chinese: 第179师) was created in February 1949 under the Regulation of the Redesignations of All Organizations and Units of the Army, issued by Central Military Commission on November 1, 1948, basing on the 23rd Brigade, 8th Column of the Huabei Military Region Field Force. Its history could be traced to the 23rd Brigade of Taiyue Military District, activated in December 1945.

The division was part of 60th Corps. Under the flag of the 179th division, it took part in many major battles in the Chinese Civil War, including the Linfen Campaign, Jinzhong Campaign, Taiyuan Campaign, and Chengdu Campaign. The division (then brigade) became the first unit that breached into the city perimeter during the Linfen Campaign, and received the honorific title of Linfen Brigade(Chinese: 临汾旅) after that.

In March 1951, the division was deployed into Korea as a part of the People's Volunteer Army along with the 60th Corps. In September 1953, the division left Korea.

The division was then garrisoned in Bengbu, Anhui Province.

In November 1953, the 559th Artillery Regiment was activated and attached to the division.

From April 1960, the division was renamed as the 179th Army Division(Chinese: 陆军第179师). By then the division was composed of:

- 535th Regiment
- 536th Regiment
- 537th Regiment
- 559th Artillery Regiment

In January 1961, the division was defined as one of the first ten combat alert divisions.

In February 1961, the 283rd Tank Self-Propelled Artillery Regiment joined the division from the 181st Army Division.

From July 1962, the division maintained as a northern division, category A.

From June to November 1962, the division was deployed to Fujian Province for counter-invasion operation against the ROC Army. The invasion did not happen and the 179th returned to its barracks in November.

On September 30, 1967, 283rd Tank Self-Propelled Artillery Regiment detached from the division to join the newly-activated 9th Tank Division.

In August 1969, 566th Artillery Regiment was renamed the Artillery Regiment, 179th Army Division.

In September 1985, the division was redesignated as the 179th Infantry Division(Chinese: 步兵第179师) and reconstituted as a northern infantry division, category B. The division was transferred to the 12th Army following 60th Army Corps' disbandment.

In 1989, 535th Regiment was reconstituted as the Special Security Regiment of the Nanjing Military Region.

In 1998 the division was reduced and reorganized as the 179th Motorized Infantry Brigade(Chinese: 摩托化步兵第179旅).

In April 2017, the brigade was reorganized as the 179th Light Combined Arms Brigade(Chinese: 轻型合成第179旅).

The brigade now stations in Nanjing, Jiangsu Province, as a maneuvering part of PLA 72nd Army.
