= Chinese spring offensive =

Korean War offensive conducted by the Chinese PVA

Coordinates: 37.9427°N 126.9392°E

Chinese spring offensive of 1951
- Part of the Korean War
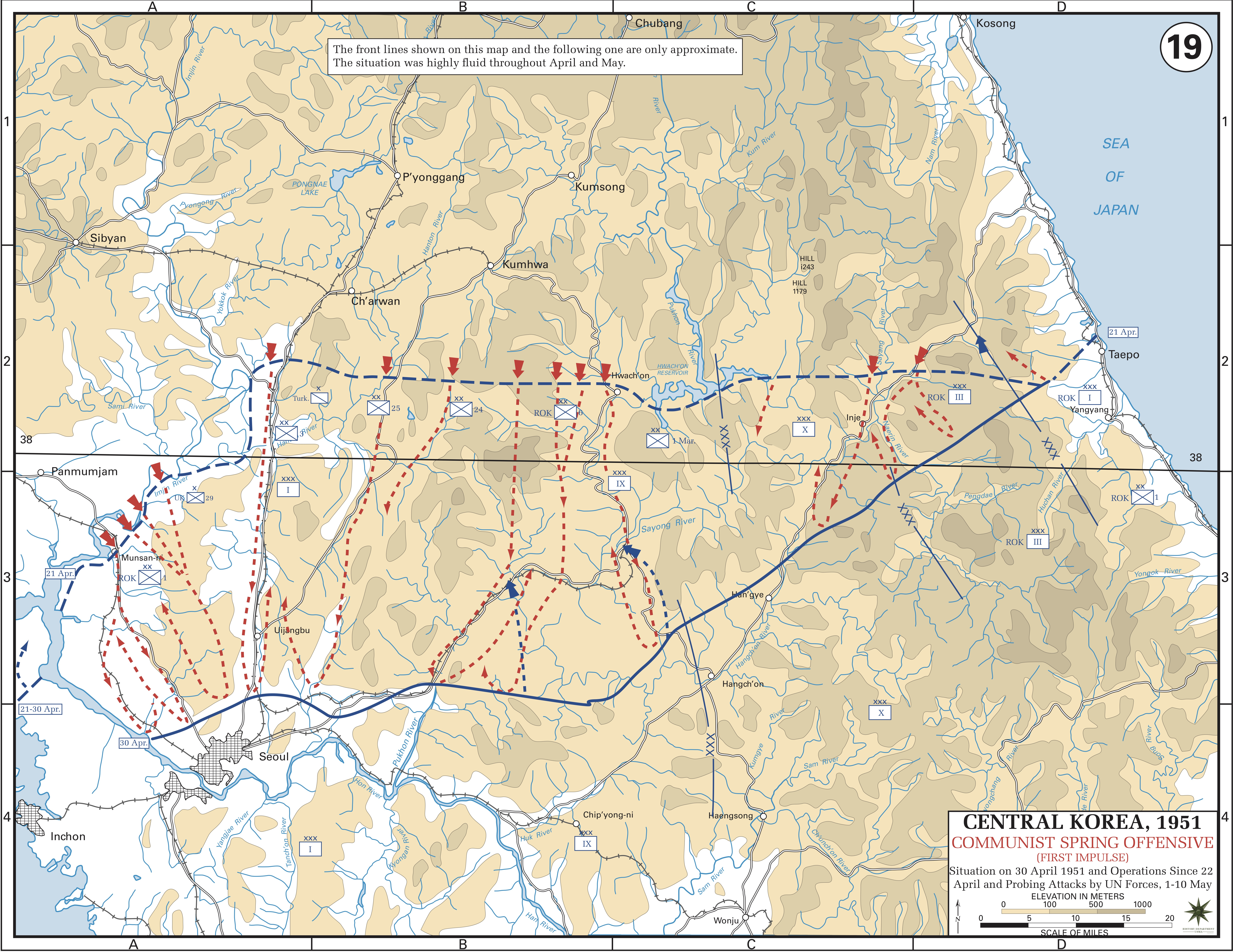
- Map of the offensive, showing the PVA/KPA gains
Date	22 April – 22 May 1951
Location	near the 38th Parallel, Korea
Result	United Nations victory: Chinese forces fail to recapture Seoul; UN launches a counteroffensive in May

Belligerents
United Nations (UNC): Australia; Belgium; Canada; South Korea; Luxembourg; New Zealand; Philippines; Turkey; United Kingdom; United States	China; North Korea

Commanders and leaders
(United Nations) Matthew Ridgway (United States) James Van Fleet	(China) Peng Dehuai (North Korea) Choi Yong-kun

Units involved
(United States) Eighth Army	(China) People's Volunteer Army (North Korea) Korean People's Army

Strength
418,500: (United States) 245,000; (First Republic of Korea) 152,000; (United Kingdom) 11,500; (Philippines) 1,500; 10,000 from other UN countries	739,000: (China) 542,000; (North Korea) 197,000

Casualties and losses
UN sources: 15,769 total casualties: (United States) 1,200+ killed 10 missing; (United Kingdom) 141 killed 522 captured; (Australia) 32 killed 3 captured; (Philippines) 16 killed 6 missing; (Belgium) 12 killed; (Canada) 12 killed; (New Zealand) 2 killed; (First Republic of Korea) unknown; Chinese estimate: 82,769 total casualties	Chinese sources: 85,000–90,000 killed or wounded (Chinese only); 17,000 captured UN estimate: 110,000–160,609 total casualties (Chinese and North Korean)

The Chinese spring offensive (Chinese: 中国春季攻势), also known as the Chinese Fifth Phase Offensive (Chinese: 第五次战役), was a military operation conducted by the Chinese People's Volunteer Army (PVA) during the Korean War. Mobilizing three field armies totaling 700,000 men for the operation, the Chinese command conducted their largest offensive operation since their Second Phase Offensive in November and December 1950. The operation took place in the spring of 1951 and aimed at permanently driving the United Nations Command (UNC) forces off the Korean peninsula.

The offensive's first thrust fell upon the units of US I Corps and US IX Corps on 22 April but was halted at the No-Name Line north of Seoul by 30 April. On 15 May 1951, the PVA and Korean People's Army (KPA) commenced the second impulse of the spring offensive and attacked the Republic of Korea Army (ROK) and US X Corps in the east. Although initially successful, they were halted by 22 May. On 20 May, perceiving that the enemy were overextended, the US Eighth Army counterattacked the exhausted PVA/KPA forces, inflicting heavy losses.

== Background ==
=== Chinese intervention ===
North Korea invaded South Korea on 25 June 1950. But after having conquered much of southern Korea, the KPA suffered crushing defeats after losing much of their army at the Battle of the Pusan Perimeter in early September. Outflanked by the landing at Incheon on 15 September, Eighth Army broke out of the Pusan Perimeter starting on 16 September and pursued the KPA north; in October they crossed the 38th Parallel, the dividing line between North and South Korea and invaded North Korea in turn. The Chinese government warned that to safeguard their national sovereignty, they would militarily intervene in Korea if American forces crossed the parallel. However, US president Harry Truman dismissed the warning.

As the UN forces raced to the Yalu River after capturing Pyongyang on 19 October, the Chinese launched their first offensive of the war on 25 October. Undeterred, UN Commander Douglas MacArthur initiated the Home-by-Christmas offensive aimed at unifying Korea. In response, the Chinese launched their Second Phase Offensive on 25 November that forced the UN forces to retreat from North Korea in December 1950, carrying the war back south of the 38th Parallel, with Seoul being abandoned to the PVA/KPA on 4 January 1951. Reeling from these defeats, the UN Command sought to commence ceasefire negotiations with the Chinese government in January 1951, but Mao Zedong and his colleagues ardently refused; as a result, the United Nations General Assembly passed Resolution 498 on 1 February, condemning China as an aggressor, and demanded that its forces withdraw from Korea.

=== UN counteroffensives ===
The UN Command, under new commander Matthew Ridgway, began counterattacks in late January 1951 that retook Seoul from the PVA/KPA on 16 March and brought the fighting to the hills situated along the 38th Parallel. PVA commanders launched a counterattack in mid-February, with their Fourth Phase Campaign, but after gaining ground, this too was halted by UN troops in the Battle of Hoengsong and the Battle of Chipyong-ni. The PVA by this time had been badly mauled, and were worn out from incessant combat and exhaustion and their supply lines had been constantly bombed, further weakening their fighting capabilities due to lack of food and supplies.

In mid-April 1951 UN forces in the central front in Korea were engaged in Operation Dauntless to advance UN positions from the Kansas Line 2–6 miles (3.2–9.7 km) north of the 38th Parallel to positions 10–20 miles (16–32 km) north of the 38th Parallel designated the Wyoming Line which would threaten the PVA/KPA logistics hub marked out by the towns of Pyonggang, Ch'orwon and Kumhwa named the Iron Triangle. The advance by US I and IX Corps was to menace the Triangle, not invest it and if struck by strong enemy attacks during or after the advance, the two Corps were to return to the Kansas Line.

US Eighth Army intelligence on 18 April warned that a PVA/KPA attack was likely any time between 20 April and 1 May but on 21 April Eighth Army commander General James Van Fleet decided to continue the Dauntless advance.

I Corps' final Dauntless objectives lay in the zones of the US 25th and 24th Infantry Divisions stretching north of the Utah Line (which arched 11 miles (18 km) above Kansas between the Imjin River and the eastern slopes of Kungmang Mountain, its trace resting on the prominent Kumhak, Kwangdok and Paegun mountain masses) to Ch'orwon and Kumhwa at the base of the Iron Triangle. Leading the IX Corps' advance were the ROK 6th Division and the US 1st Marine Division. In their sector the Wyoming Line curved southeast from the Kumhwa area to the Hwacheon Reservoir. On 21 April the two divisions moved 2–5 miles (3.2–8.0 km) above the Kansas Line against almost no opposition. Immediately west, the 24th Division did not test the opposition below Kumhwa, but deliberately stood fast in the Kwangdok-san ridges to allow the neighboring ROK 6th Division to come abreast. In the Pogae-san heights, the 25th Division attacked toward Ch'orwon, but made no substantial progress after receiving increasing artillery fire during the day and becoming involved in hard fights right at the Utah Line, especially in the zone of the Turkish Brigade along Route 33. Neither Corps developed evidence of enemy offensive preparations during the day. The absence of opposition in the IX Corps' zone only confirmed the recent patrol reports of PVA/KPA withdrawal. Below the Iron Triangle, the resistance that began to stiffen on 19 April had been expected to grow progressively heavier as I Corps' forces moved above the Utah Line. On the Imjin River front, daylight patrols working above the river again found only a scattering of PVA. I Corps' commander General Frank W. Milburn concluded in an evening wrap-up report to Van Fleet that the "enemy attitude remains defensive."

On 21 April, the Eighth Army G-2 (intelligence officer) reported that his information still was not firm enough to "indicate the nearness" of the impending enemy offensive with any degree of certainty. A worrisome fact, as he earlier had pointed out to Van Fleet, was that a lack of offensive signs did not necessarily mean that the opening of the offensive was distant. In preparing past attacks, PVA forces had successfully concealed their locations until they moved into forward assembly areas immediately before they attacked. In the US X Corps' zone north and northeast of Yanggu, US 2nd and 7th Infantry Division patrols, after several days of nearly fruitless searches, located several groups of 600-1000 KPA immediately above the Corps' front. These groups suggested, as X Corps' commander General Edward Almond reported to Van Fleet, that a relief or reinforcement of enemy units was taking place.

Aerial reconnaissance after daybreak on 22 April, reported a general forward displacement of enemy formations from rear assemblies northwest of I Corps and north of both I and IX Corps, also extensive troop movements, both north and south, on the roads above Yanggu and Inje east of the Hwacheon Reservoir. Though air strikes punished the moving troops bodies, air observers reported the southward march of enemy groups with increasing frequency during the day. On the basis of the sightings west of the Hwacheon Reservoir, it appeared that the enemy forces approaching I Corps would mass evenly across the Corps' front while those moving toward IX Corps would concentrate on the front of the ROK 6th Division.

For the scheduled advance to the Alabama Line east of the Hwacheon Reservoir, the X Corps/ROK III Corps boundary was to be shifted 4 miles (6.4 km) west at noon on 23 April, to give the ROK III Corps, which had been operating with only the ROK 3rd Division on line, a two-division front. The III Corps' reserve division, the ROK 7th Division, began occupying the added frontage on the 22nd, its 5th Regiment relieving the ROK 36th Regiment, 5th Division and the X Corps' right early in the evening. On 23 April, the incoming division's 3rd Regiment was to move into a 2 miles (3.2 km) gap directly above Inje between the 5th Regiment and the 35th Regiment, now the right flank unit of the 5th Division. The latter's 36th Regiment meanwhile assembled 3 miles (4.8 km) below its former position in preparation for moving west into the redrawn 5th Division zone the following day as the remainder of the ROK 7th Division came into its new area. A similar shifting of KPA forces above the X and ROK III Corps was indicated when the ROK 5th Division, previously in contact with the KPA 45th Division, III Corps above Inje, captured a member of the KPA 12th Division, V Corps. Farther east, the ROK 3rd Division, which had had almost no contact since reaching the Kansas Line, received hard local attacks that drove in its outposts and pressed its main line before easing in the evening of 22 April. Thus the KPA III Corps could be shifting west toward the reservoir and the KPA V Corps returning to the line from a point above Inje eastward.

On 22 April, as I and IX Corps continued their advance toward the Wyoming Line. The progress of the attack resembled that on the previous day, IX Corps' forces making easy moves of 2–3 miles (3.2–4.8 km), the two I Corps divisions being limited to shorter gains by heavier resistance. On the east flank of the advance, the Hwacheon Dam, defended so stoutly by PVA 39th Army forces only a few days earlier, fell to the 1st Korean Marine Corps Regiment (1st KMC) without a fight. But a PVA captive taken elsewhere in the 1st Marine Division zone during the afternoon told interrogators that an attack would open before the day was out. In mid-afternoon the ROK 6th Division captured several members of the PVA 60th Division and, immediately west, the US 24th Infantry Division took captives from the PVA 59th Division. These two divisions belonged to the fresh 20th Army. The full IX Army Group had reached the front. In the US 25th Infantry Division's zone on the west flank of the advance, six PVA who blundered into the hands of the Turkish Brigade along Route 33 during the afternoon were members of a survey party from the PVA 2nd Motorized Artillery Division. The division's guns, according to the officer in charge, were being positioned to support an attack scheduled to start after dark.

== Planning ==
PVA Commander-in-Chief Peng Dehuai and the rest of his command, determined to evict the UN forces from Korea permanently, reformed his frontline forces and amassed a strike force of three field armies and three KPA corps, totaling 700,000 men. Of these, he ordered 270,000 from the III, IX and XIX Army Groups to be directed for an assault towards Seoul, while the rest were deployed elsewhere on the battlefront with 214,000 men serving as their strategic reserve to be committed for support purposes. The PVA III and XIX Armies, under orders from Chairman Mao Zedong, began to enter Korea in February 1951, alongside four field artillery divisions, two long range artillery divisions, four anti-aircraft divisions, one multiple rocket launcher division, and four tank regiments equipped with the T-34-85, marking the first time the Chinese had deployed such weapons in the war.

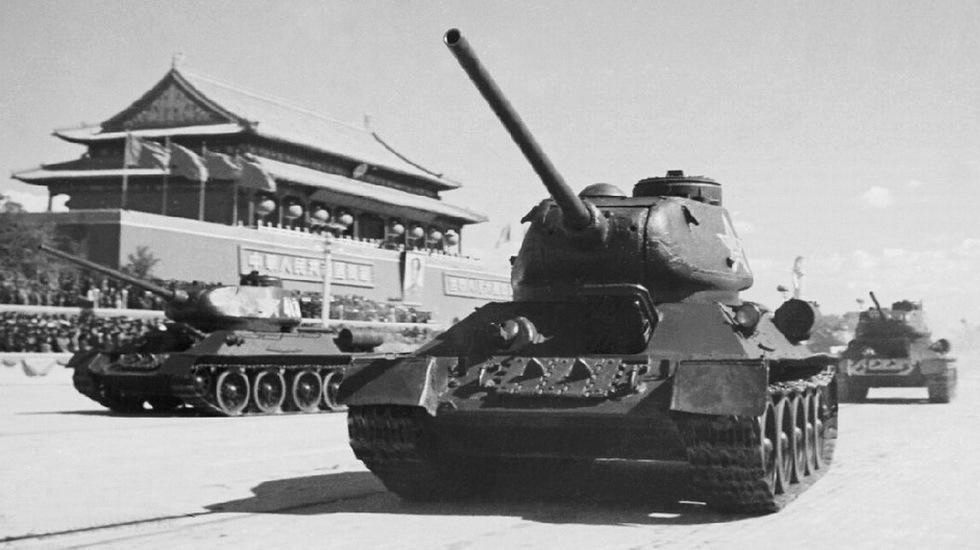
Chinese T-34-85 tank.

The immediate objective of the ground attack was Seoul, whose capture Peng reportedly promised to Mao as a May Day gift. Peng planned to converge on the city, employing principally his fresh III, IX and XIX Army Groups. From above the Imjin on the west wing of the main effort, the XIX Army Group was to attack southeast toward Seoul, crossing the river on a 12 miles (19 km) front centered on the Korangp’o-ri bend and advancing on the capital through a narrowing zone between Routes 1 and 33. The group commander, Yang Teh-chih, planned to cross the Imjin with two armies, the 64th between Route 1 and the town of Korangp’o-ri, the 63rd between Korangp’o-ri and the confluence of the Imjin and Hantan Rivers. Yang's deployment would pit the 64th Army against the bulk of the ROK 1st Division and the 63rd Army against the British 29th Brigade occupying the left half of the US 3rd Infantry Division’s sector. Out of the ground between the Imjin and Chorwon, the III Army Group was to advance south on the Route 33 axis, its three armies attacking abreast in columns of divisions. Nearest the Imjin, the 15th Army had a narrow zone between the river and Route 33 projecting through the area occupied by the US 65th Infantry Regiment. Along Route 33 and east of it, the 12th Army and 60th Army at group center and left were to attack through ground held by the Philippine 10th Battalion Combat Team on the right flank of the US 3rd Infantry Division and through the Pogae-san ridges occupied by the Turkish Brigade and US 24th Infantry Regiment in the sector of the US 25th Infantry Division. On the left of the main effort, the IX Army Group was to advance southwest out of the Kumhwa area, guiding on Route 3. Sung Shih-lun, the group commander, set the 27th Army on his right for an attack astride Route 3. The 27th thus initially would be advancing in a zone centered on the boundary between the US 25th and 24th Infantry Divisions. Similarly, the 20th Army on the group's left would attack along the US I-IX Corps boundary through portions of the 24th Division and ROK 6th Division sectors. Peng's plan included auxiliary attacks along each flank of the main effort and another east of the Hwacheon Reservoir. In the west, KPA I Corps was to move southeast toward Seoul over Route 1 and through the ground between the road and the Han River, but its leading forces displacing forward from behind the Ryesong River would not reach the Imjin in time to participate in the opening attack on the ROK 1st Division. In the area adjacent to the Hwacheon Dam, the somewhat worn 39th and 40th Armies of the XIII Army Group were to assist with holding attacks on either side of Route 17 in the eastern portion of the ROK 6th Division's sector and the sector of the US 1st Marine Division.

In what would be essentially a separate effort east of the Hwacheon Reservoir, KPA forces were to strike for Yanggu and Inje, where breakthroughs could open up Routes 29 and 24 leading southwestward to Chuncheon and Hongcheon. KPA III Corps, whose 1st, 15th and 45th Divisions had been holding the entire eastern front except for the coastal area, had sidestepped westward into a narrow zone abutting on the reservoir for the attack in the Yanggu area. Moving south through the upper Soyang River valley from its assembly at Komisong, KPA V Corps had deployed in the vacated ground for the attack toward Inje. V Corps' commander, General Pang, chose to attack with his seasoned, if understrength, 6th and 12th Divisions, keeping in reserve the 32nd, a nearly full strength but green division that had replaced the 7th while the Corps was in Komisong. III Corps' commander General Yu elected a different course, committing only the 45th Division in what would be its first offensive of the war, perhaps because it had a strength of 8600 men, more than twice the strength of either of Yu's other divisions. The deployment of the 45th Division set it against the US 23rd Infantry Regiment, 2nd Infantry Division at the edge of the reservoir above Yanggu and the 17th and 32nd Infantry Regiments of the 7th Infantry Division in the adjacent ground to the east. On the opposite wing of the KPA effort, the KPA 6th Division faced the ROK 3rd Division. At center, the 12th Division was poised for an attack in a zone straddling the US X Corps-ROK III Corps boundary and leading directly to Inje.

== Battle ==
=== First offensive (22–30 April) ===
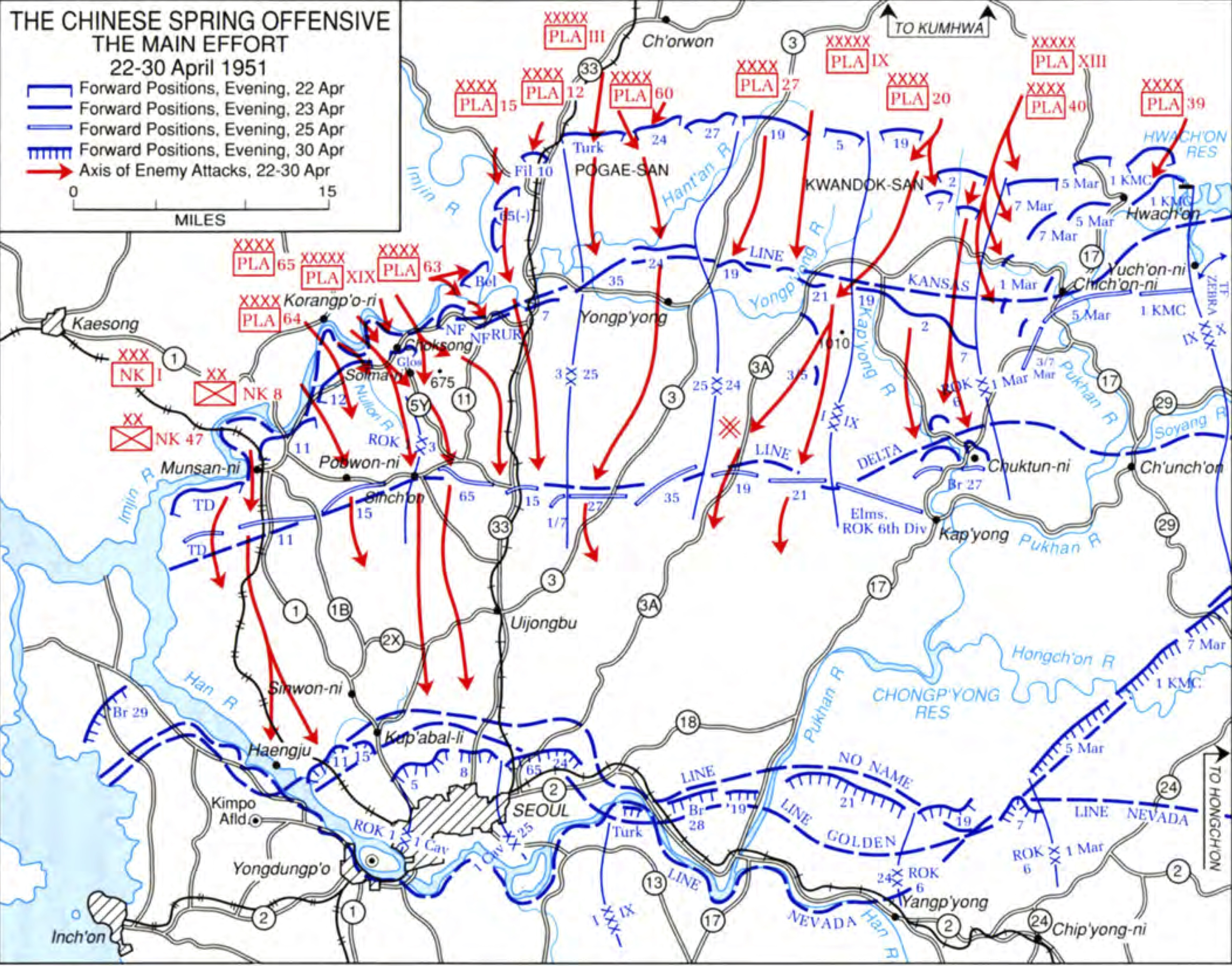
The spring offensive, western front

==== ROK 6th Division collapses (22 April) ====
During the afternoon of 22 April, IX Corps' airborne artillery observers located and brought down fire on a large enemy force concentrated ahead of the ROK 6th Division. Anticipating an attack, General Chang halted his division's advance toward the Wyoming Line about 16:00 and ordered his forward regiments, the 19th and 2nd, to develop defensive positions tied in with each other and with the 24th Division and 1st Marine Division on their respective outside flanks. Chang moved his reserve 7th Regiment into supporting positions immediately behind the 2nd Regiment, ahead of which more enemy forces had been observed than ahead of the 19th Regiment. Placing reserves so close to the front went against the recommendation of his Korean Military Advisory Group (KMAG) adviser, but Chang intended that this show of support would counter uneasiness that had begun to spread among his line forces at word of a probable PVA attack.

IX Corps' commander General William M. Hoge moved three Corps' artillery units forward during the afternoon to help the 1st Marine Division and, in particular, to reinforce the support being given the ROK 6th Division by the New Zealand artillery; Company C, 2nd Chemical Mortar Battalion; and the division's own 27th Field Artillery Battalion. The Corps' latest ground gains had opened Route 17 in the 1st Marine Division's sector far enough north to allow use of a twisting, narrowly confined valley road branching west off Route 17 near the village of Chich’on-ni into the ROK 6th Division's rear area. The 92nd Armored Field Artillery Battalion moved up Route 17 and out the minor road to the west edge of the Marine sector from where its 155 mm self-propelled howitzers could support both the Marines and the ROK. The 987th Armored Field Artillery Battalion and 2nd Rocket Field Artillery Battery, both equipped with 105 mm howitzers, used the winding valley road to reach the right half of the ROK sector, where they took position behind the 7th Regiment near the ROK artillery and US 4.2-inch mortars.

For reasons that never became clear, the ROK 2nd and 19th Regiments failed to develop the defensive positions ordered by Chang. With numerous gaps and open outside flanks, the division front was vulnerable to infiltration, and the nearby reserves were almost as subject to attack as were the forward units. Forces of the PVA 60th Division, 20th Army, hit Chang's lines about 20:00. Without artillery support and with little other supporting fire, units of the 179th Regiment, 60th Division, struck the inside battalion of the 2nd Regiment. Forces following punched through a central gap, some veering west and east behind the 19th and 2nd Regiments, others continuing south toward the 7th Regiment. Within minutes both line regiments were in full flight. Caught up in the rush of troops from the 2nd Regiment, the 7th Regiment joined the wild retreat. Abandoned weapons, vehicles, and equipment littered vacated positions and lines of drift as the South Koreans streamed south, east, and west, rapidly uncovering the fire support units. The New Zealand artillery supporting the 19th Regiment in the west managed to withdraw with guns and equipment intact down the Kapyong River valley to a position 4 miles (6.4 km) north of the 27th British Commonwealth Brigade assembled near Kapyong town. To the east, PVA following the 2nd and 7th Regiments caught the ROK 27th Field Artillery Battalion in position. Under fire, its members abandoned guns and joined the southerly surge of infantrymen. The US support units pulled out all weapons and equipment, but came under fire as they moved east on their narrow access road to join the 92nd Armored Field Artillery Battalion. Hampered further by ROK troops, trucks and equipment cluttering and finally blocking the poor road, Company C, 2nd Chemical Mortar Battalion, and the 2nd Rocket Field Artillery Battery reached the 92nd with none of their principal weapons, the 987th Armored Field Artillery Battalion with about half its equipment.

Having lost radio and wire communications with his regimental commanders soon after the panic began, Chang was hard pressed to regain control of his forces, even when they outdistanced the PVA pursuit after midnight. Traveling rear areas throughout the night, Chang and his staff established a degree of order near dawn, collecting about 2,500 members of his three regiments some 10 miles (16 km) south of the division's original front. To the same depth, the ROK rout had peeled open the flanks of the 24th Division to the west and 1st Marine Division to the east. At the first indication of the ROK retreat, the 1st Marine Division commander, General Smith, had begun to shore up his left flank, drawing a battalion from the 1st Marines in reserve near Chuncheon and sending it out the valley road from Chich’on-ni to establish defenses tied in with the 92nd Armored Field Artillery Battalion. En route aboard trucks before midnight, the 1st Battalion struggled west against a current of retreating South Koreans and scarcely managed to establish a position before dawn. Operating in a zone coinciding with the eastern third of the ROK 6th Division sector and the western edge of the Marine sector, the 40th Army of the XIII Army Group was well situated to exploit the exposed Marine flank. The 120th Division at the army's left, in particular, had virtually the entire night to move deep into the vacated ROK sector and sweep behind the Marine front. But, either unaware of the opportunity to envelop the Marines or, more likely, unable to change course rapidly, the 120th attempted only local frontal assaults on the 7th Marines west of Hwacheon town, none of which penetrated or forced a withdrawal. Farther east, forces of the 115th Division, 39th Army, penetrated the 1st Korean Marine Corps Regiment above the Hwacheon Dam and slashed southwestward to occupy heights commanding the town of Hwacheon in the 5th Marines’ central sector; American and ROK counterattacks eliminated this penetration near dawn, and the 115th made no further attempt to take the dam or town.

Eager to close ranks as the IX Corps' front quieted after daylight on the 23rd, Hoge ordered the ROK 6th Division to occupy positions on the Kansas Line, 3 miles (4.8 km) north of the area in which Chang was reassembling his forces. The 1st Marine Division was to pull back against the Pukhan River to a line anchored near the Hwacheon Dam and curving southwest to a juncture with the ROK. Manning the long curve would require the commitment of the entire 1st Marine Division, and even then he would not be able to set up a solid front. Chang faced no small task in recovering troops who had scattered east and west into adjacent sectors, reorganizing his entire division, and then moving his nervous forces north toward the PVA. But the adjustments, if achieved, would retain control of the Hwach’on Dam, eliminate the Marines’ open left flank, and join the two IX Corps divisions with a minimum of movement.

==== Cheorwon and Kumhwa (22–23 April) ====
At the right of US I Corps, the PVA 59th Division, 20th Army, though kept under artillery fire while massing in the Kwandok-san ridges below Kumhwa, struck hard at the center of the US 24th Infantry Division. Leading forces opened a gap between the 19th and 5th Infantry Regiments; reinforcements widened the attack, but concentrated on moving through the gap and down a ridge behind the inside battalion of the 19th Infantry. Pressure on the adjacent battalion of the 5th Infantry forced it to withdraw almost 1 mile (1.6 km). Quick to follow, the PVA reengaged the battalion within an hour. Regimental reserves took up blocking positions on the flanks of the PVA penetration and helped to confine it, but General Blackshear M. Bryan’s attempt to move part of his reserve 21st Infantry Regiment from the Kansas Line north onto high ground at the point of penetration failed when PVA occupied the ground first. By daylight the PVA drove almost 3 miles (4.8 km) through the center of the division. Bryan withdrew his line regiments down the sides of the PVA wedge into positions below it, where, though kept under pressure at center, they were able to stand. Meanwhile, on learning of the ROK 6th Division's retreat on his right, Bryan set the 21st Infantry in blocking positions along the endangered flank. The Eighth Army Ranger Company, attached to the 21st, patrolled east in search of PVA approaching the flank but made no contact.

In the Pogae-san ridges below Cheorwon, the PVA 2nd Motorized Artillery Division prepared the way for infantry attacks on the 25th Division with a three-hour bombardment, dropping most of its fire on the Turkish Brigade along Route 33. On the east wing of the III Army Group, the 179th Division, 60th Army, attacked behind the fire about midnight, its bulk hitting the Turks, some forces spilling over against the 24th Infantry at division center. The latter bent back the left of the 24th's line while the forces attacking the Turkish position penetrated at several points and so intermingled themselves that artillery units supporting the brigade were forced to stop firing lest they hit Turks as well as Chinese. Further fragmented by persistent attacks through the night, the Turkish position by morning consisted mainly of surrounded or partially surrounded company perimeters, and PVA penetrating between the Turks and the curled-back left flank of the 24th Infantry moved almost 2 miles (3.2 km) behind the division's front. Ahead of the 27th Infantry Regiment on the division's right, PVA forces (apparently the westernmost forces of the 27th Army) massed and began their approach at first light, but heavy defensive fire shattered the formation within half an hour, and the PVA attempted no further attack on the regiment. Near dawn General Joseph S. Bradley ordered the 24th and 27th Infantry Regiments to withdraw 2 miles (3.2 km) and instructed the Turkish Brigade to leave the line and reorganize south of the Hantan River. The 35th Infantry Regiment came out of reserve to take over the Turkish sector. The Turks fought their way off the front during the morning and, except for one company that had been virtually wiped out, assembled below the Hantan in better condition than Bradley had expected. The PVA followed neither the Turks nor the two regiments, and the division sector quieted as Bradley developed his new line.

==== Imjin River (22–25 April) ====
General Robert H. Soule, the 3rd Infantry Division commander considered the Division's front along the Imjin between Korangp’o-ri and Route 33 to be particularly vulnerable to attack, not only because the line was long and thin with gaps between defensive positions but also because it lay generally alongside and at no great distance from Route 33, his main axis of communications. The 65th Infantry and the attached Philippine 10th Battalion Combat Team occupied the right half of the line, with the Filipinos on the outside flank along Route 33 and the 2nd and 3rd Battalions facing northwest and west along the Imjin. In regimental reserve, the 1st Battalion was located along Route 33 just above the Hant’an River. The British 29th Brigade with the Belgian Battalion attached held the remainder of the division's line.

The 29th Infantry Brigade consisted of three British and the Belgian Battalion supported by tanks and artillery. Despite facing a numerically superior enemy, the brigade held its positions for three days, repelling several human wave attacks and inflicting more than 10,000 casualties in the process. After being encircled, however, the 1st Battalion Gloucestershire Regiment, nicknamed the 'Glosters', was nearly destroyed and those surviving were captured. In the course of the battle, the brigade suffered 1,091 casualties, including 622 of the Glosters. This was considered by the PVA as one of their spectacular feats of arms during the war, although their casualties were nearly ten times that of their adversaries. The loss of the regiment caused much controversy in Britain and within the UN Command.

==== Hwacheon (22–24 April) ====
With the collapse of the ROK 6th Division a 10 miles (16 km) penetration was created and the US 1st Marine Division was in serious jeopardy. At 21:30 the duty officer at the 1st Marine Division command post was informed that the PVA had penetrated ROK defenses and were headed toward Marine lines. Not long after the message arrived the vanguard of a long line of demoralized ROK soldiers began filing in. By 22:24 the impact of the disaster on the left was apparent, so all plans to resume the Operation Dauntless attack the next day were abruptly canceled. The 1st Marine Division and attached 1st Korean Marine Corps Regiment came under attack from the PVA 120th Division at 02:00 on 23 April and with help from supporting arms successfully defended their positions until the morning when they were ordered to retreat to the Pendleton Line at 09:35 on 23 April to avoid being surrounded. The Marines successfully withdrew under fire towards the Pukhan River and Chuncheon. The PVA attacked the new Marine positions on the night of 23-24 April but were repulsed.

==== Withdrawal to the Kansas Line (22–23 April) ====
Considering the forward I Corps' and IX Corps' positions untenable, opened to envelopment as they were by the flight of the ROK 6th Division, Van Fleet about mid-morning on 23 April ordered General Frank W. Milburn and Hoge to withdraw and directed all Corps' commanders to develop defenses in depth along the Kansas Line. At the same time, Van Fleet cancelled the advance to the Alabama Line which was to have been opened on the 24th by forces east of the Hwachon Reservoir. For the forces east of the reservoir, the initial task created by Van Fleet's order was to block a KPA salient being driven into the Kansas Line. Above Yanggu, adjacent to the reservoir, the inexperienced KPA 45th Division had attacked during the night behind mortar and artillery barrages, but had made only a few local gains against the 32nd Infantry on the right flank of the 7th Division. On the east flank of the enemy attack, the KPA 6th Division was more successful in assaults on the ROK 3rd Division. Forcing its left and center units to the southwest, by mid-morning on the 23rd the KPA had pushed the ROK 3rd Division well back from Route 24, partially opening the way to Inje.

A bigger threat to Inje materialized at the right flank of US X Corps, where the KPA 12th Division caught X Corps and ROK III Corps part way through the shift of divisions required for the now canceled advance to the Alabama Line. The 12th Division struck the ROK 35th Regiment, 5th Division at midnight on the 22nd and began sliding forces into the 2 miles (3.2 km) gap between the 35th and the 5th Regiment of the ROK 7th Division to the east. By first light the 35th Regiment abandoned its position and fell back in disorder almost to the Soyang River below Inje. Taken under frontal attack and threatened with encirclement by the KPA working through the gap, the 5th Regiment followed suit but withdrew in better order, falling back gradually while still in contact toward a line 2 miles (3.2 km) above Inje. During the day, Colonel Min Ki Shik, in command of the ROK 5th Division, took charge of all forces in the Inje area, which now included the 3rd Regiment, 7th Division, and organized defenses above Inje generally in the area toward which the 5th Regiment was withdrawing. By evening of the 23rd Colonel Min set the 27th, 36th and 3rd Regiments on the line while the 35th Regiment continued to reorganize behind it and the 5th Regiment continued to withdraw toward it.

As the initial IX Corps step to the rear Hoge let stand his plan to pull the 1st Marine Division onto a line curving from the Hwacheon Dam southwestward along the Pukhan River and to push the ROK 6th Division north onto the Kansas Line. This would not be an easy maneuver because it would require the Marines disengaging under fire and making several river crossings. To do this, Smith had to restore tactical unity prior to movement. The 1st Marines was reunited on the morning of the 24th when 1st Battalion, 1st Marines, which had been hotly engaged while attached to the 7th Marines for the past few days, rejoined the regiment. Concurrently, the 3rd Battalion, 1st Marines, conducted a fighting withdrawal protected by Marine, Navy and Air Force air strikes and artillery fire by Marine and Army units. The battered 3rd Battalion passed through the 2nd Battalion and then both units fought their way back to the high ground covering the river crossing. The regiment was under continuous fire during the entire movement and suffered numerous casualties en route. At the same time, 3rd Battalion, 7th Marines, set up farther south on Hill 696 to defend the Chuncheon-Kapyong road as well as the southern ferry sites. This key position, the southernmost high ground, dominated the Chuncheon Corridor and the Pukhan River and would be one of the last positions vacated. On the right, the 5th Marines and the Korean Marine battalion pulled back harassed by only scattered resistance. The resultant shortening of the division front allowed Smith to pull the 7th Marines out of the lines and use it as the division reserve. By the evening of 24 April, the 1st Marine Division's lines resembled a fishhook with the Korean Marines at the eye in the north, the 5th Marines forming the shank, and the 1st Marines at the curved barb in the south. The 7th Marines, less the 3rd Battalion, was charged with rear area security and its 1st and 2d Battalions were positioned to protect river crossings along the route to Chuncheon as well as the town itself.

The 1st Marines again bore the brunt of PVA probes on the night of 24–25 April, but accurate close-in fires by 105 mm and 155 mm howitzers kept potential attackers at a distance. The 2nd Battalion repelled a PVA company in the only major action of the evening. But the PVA were still lurking in the west as became evident when patrols departing friendly lines in that area quickly struck an enemy hornet's nest the following morning. One such patrol was pinned down less than 200 yards (180 m) from friendly lines. Another platoon suffered 18 casualties and had to be extricated from an ambush by tanks. On the other hand, 5th Marines and Korean Marine scouts ventured 1 mile (1.6 km) to the north without contact. Air and artillery plastered the western flank, but PVA machine gun, mortar, and artillery fire continued to hit Marine positions. In the 1st Marines' zone PVA gunners found the 3rd Battalion command post, wounding the regiment and battalion commanders. Major Trompeter took over the battalion. Colonel McAlister refused evacuation and remained in command of the regiment. It was obvious the PVA were biding their time until they could gather enough strength for another try at the Marine lines. There was continual pressure, but the 11th Marines artillery harassment and interdiction fires, direct fire by Marine tanks, and an air umbrella prevented a major assault. PVA action was limited to only a few weak probes and a handful of mortar rounds as the marines moved back. The 1st Marine Division reached the modified Kansas Line in good order, despite suffering more than 300 casualties in the last 48 hours. The month of April cost the Marines 933 casualties (93 killed, 830 wounded and 10 missing), most lost during the offensive. The 92nd Armored Field Artillery Battalion and the units that had joined it after scrambling out of the ROK 6th Division's sector withdrew to the vicinity of Chich’on-ni, where the bulk of the Marine division's artillery, the 11th Marine Regiment, was clustered. Hoge directed the 92nd, which absorbed the members of the weaponless 2nd Rocket Field Artillery Battery, and the half-equipped 987th Field Artillery Battalion to reinforce the fires of the 11th Marines. Company C, 2nd Chemical Mortar Battalion, out of action for lack of weapons and equipment, left the division sector for refurbishing.

Since the ROK 6th Division had lost its artillery support during the debacle of the previous night, Hoge directed the British 27th Brigade to recommit the New Zealand artillery and transferred the 213th Field Artillery Battalion from a reinforcing mission in the Marine sector to support the ROK. During the afternoon the New Zealand unit, accompanied by the Middlesex battalion for protection, moved up the valley of the Kapyong River while the 213th circled out of the Marine sector and moved up the valley of a Kapyong tributary in the eastern portion of the ROK sector. Meanwhile, as the day wore on, the move of the ROK 6th Division north to the Kansas Line appeared less and less probable. Still reorganizing the division at midday, Chang informed IX Corps' headquarters that he would have his forces on the line by 17:00. But as that hour approached, no part of the division had yet moved forward. Wary of another failing performance by Chang's division, Hoge in midafternoon ordered the British 27th Brigade to block the Kapyong River valley behind the ROK to prevent enemy forces from coursing down the valley and cutting Route 17 at Kapyong town. Brigadier Burke was to establish the blocking position along the trace of line Delta 4 miles (6.4 km) north of town where the Kapyong River flowing from the northwest was joined by the tributary from the northeast just above a large bend turning the Kapyong southwest toward the Pukhan. From hill masses rising on either side of the junction of the Kapyong and its tributary the commonwealth forces could cover both valley approaches.

Hoge directed the 1st Marine Division to withdraw to the Kansas Line the following morning. This move would shorten the front enough for the bulk of one regiment to be taken off the line and sent south to defend Chuncheon.

Along the eastern portion of the I Corps' line, the 25th Division, whose front had quieted after daylight on the 23rd, was on the Kansas Line by midafternoon. The 35th and 24th Infantry Regiments reoccupied the division's former positions on the ridges between the Hantan and Yongp’yong rivers while the 27th Infantry and Turkish Brigade assembled immediately behind the Yongp’yong. At the far Corps' right, the PVA maintained pressure against the center of the 24th Division, mainly against the 19th Infantry, and attempted to follow the division's withdrawal but gave up after suffering heavy casualties to the covering artillery fire. The division occupied the Kansas Line about 18:00, the 19th and 21st Infantry Regiments on left and right, the 5th Infantry in reserve about 5 miles (8.0 km) behind the line. Later, on receiving word that the ROK 6th Division would not move north onto the Kansas Line, the 21st Infantry covered its right as far as possible with its reserve battalion, and Bryan deepened the protection by moving a battalion of the 5th Infantry into blocking positions along the east flank.

Under Soule's plan for pulling back the 3rd Division's rightmost forces, the 7th Infantry was to occupy the division's eastern sector of the Kansas Line. Protected on the west by the Belgian battalion, the 65th Infantry Regiment was to leapfrog off the Utah Line, pass through the 7th Infantry via Route 33, and assemble in division reserve near Route 33's junction with Route 11. Exactly how the Belgians would then get out of the Imjin angle was yet to be determined. The battalions of the 65th Infantry began bounding off the Utah Line about noon, moving easily as the PVA opposite made no attempt to follow. Except for the tanks supporting the Belgian battalion, the division reserves stationed earlier above the Hantan dropped below the river during the 65th's leapfrog action. No interference materialized out of the Imjin angle as the Belgians, though heavily engaged, held their ground with the assistance of air strikes and artillery and tank fire. Bringing up the regimental rear, the 3rd Battalion, 65th Infantry, reinforced by the 3rd Reconnaissance Company and 64th Tank Battalion, occupied a position blocking Route 33 just above the Hantan, which was to be held until the Belgian battalion had withdrawn from Hill 194. In considering ways to get the Belgian battalion out of the Imjin angle, Brigadier Brodie early in the afternoon proposed to Soule that the Belgians destroy their vehicles and withdraw east across the Imjin off the back side of Hill 194. But Soule believed that the bridge area could be opened for the vehicles by attacking Hill 257 from the south. About 14:00 he ordered the 1st Battalion, 7th Infantry, to make the attack and instructed the Philippine 10th Battalion Combat Team, then leading the 65th Infantry off the Utah Line, to join the 29th Brigade and take over the 1st Battalion's previously assigned mission of occupying a position in the gap between the Fusilier and Gloster battalions. In carrying out its original mission, the 1st Battalion, with a platoon of regimental tanks attached, by 14:00 had moved up Route 11 behind the Fusiliers, turned its three rifle companies west on a wide front, and begun sweeping the slopes rising to Hill 675, the peak of Kamak Mountain, in the gap area. It was 1800 before the commander, Lt. Col. Frederick C. Weyand, could reassemble the battalion and open the attack on Hill 257 to the north. Once above the Fusilier-Ulster lines, the battalion came under heavy fire from the flanks and front and had to fight off PVA groups who attempted to knock out the supporting tanks with grenades and shaped charges. By 20:00 the battalion had gained no more than a foothold in the 257 hill mass. In the Belgian withdrawal, begun as the attack on Hill 257 opened, the bulk of the battalion moved off the back side of Hill 194 and waded the Imjin under the cover of artillery fire and air strikes. Harassed by mortar fire until they ascended the steep east bank, the Belgian infantry by 18:30 were out of contact and en route east to Route 33 and then south to an assembly area to await the battalion's vehicles. In column, drivers raced the vehicles over the Imjin bridge while the 7th Infantry tankers sent to the Belgians during the morning fired on the slopes of Hill 257 to the south and the 1st Battalion, 7th Infantry, moved into the hill mass from the opposite direction. Incoming fire from Hill 257 destroyed four trucks but was generally weak. Although it had not cleared 257, Colonel Weyand's battalion apparently had distracted most of the PVA holding the hill. Once the last vehicle had crossed the bridge about 20:00, the motor column followed the track along the Hantan to reach Route 33. Troops and vehicles reunited, the Belgian battalion moved south and assembled near the Routes 33-11 junction. Behind the Belgians, the 3rd Battalion, 65th Infantry, 64th Tank Battalion and 3rd Reconnaissance Company left their Hantan blocking position, the 3rd Battalion joining the 7th Infantry on the Kansas Line, the tankers and reconnaissance troops assembling close to 3rd Division headquarters near the Routes 33-11 junction. With considerable difficulty the 1st Battalion, 7th Infantry, meanwhile disengaged at Hill 257 and returned to the 7th's sector of the Kansas Line, where it went into reserve. Ahead of all these movements, the Philippine 10th Battalion Combat Team, en route to occupy the gap in the 29th Brigade's lines, reached the brigade headquarters area along Route 11 about 20:00, too late in the day for it to attempt to take position between the Fusilier and Gloster battalions.

The withdrawal to the Kansas Line and other force adjustments swung the 3rd Division south like a gate hinged on the west at the position of the Gloster battalion, which, after consolidating forces in the Solma-ri area, had remained quiet throughout the day except for meeting engagements between patrols in Company B's sector at the far right. Both the 64th and 63rd Armies, however, had built up forces below the Imjin to the front and flanks of the battalion. To the left of the Glosters, the 192nd Division, 64th Army, had begun to ford the Imjim at three points on the Korangp’o-ri bend by daybreak. Sighted by air observers, the crossing operation was shut off by 11:00 by air strikes and artillery fire, and most of the PVA who had crossed by that time hesitated in areas not far below the river. A few company-size groups moved south and tested positions of the 12th Regiment at the right of the ROK 1st Division but were turned back by noon. Sorties by two task forces of ROK infantry and tanks of the 73rd Tank Battalion, which was attached to the 1st Division, punished PVA forces ahead of ROK lines until dusk. One task force estimated that it killed 3,000 PVA. Gloster forces on Hill 235 meanwhile caught sight of PVA on the near high ground in the gap between the battalion and the ROK 12th Regiment. They had come either from the Korangp’o-ri bend or out of the Gloster Crossing area, where, despite British mortar and artillery fire, the 187th Division, and apparently the 189th Division, pushed additional forces over the Imjin. To the northeast, units of the 187th and 188th Divisions continued to enter the gap between the Glosters and Fusiliers, directing their movement mainly toward Hill 675. Some forces worked through each gap and reached Route 5Y early in the afternoon. An attack by these forces on the Gloster supply point along the road made clear that the battalion at Solma-ri had been surrounded.

Given this penetration and the buildup of PVA below the Imjin in the west and given, in particular, the frail central position of the ROK 6th Division and open ground on either side of it, which invited envelopments both west and east, it was doubtful that I and IX Corps lines as they stood at dark on the 23rd could be held against the next surge of PVA attacks. Earlier in the day a number of officers had recommended long withdrawals to Van Fleet to gain time to organize stronger defenses. One division commander in I Corps had proposed falling back to the Golden Line just above Seoul. But Van Fleet had refused to give ground voluntarily in deep withdrawals. While by no means assuming a stand-or-die position, the enemy, he insisted, would have to "take all he gets."

==== KPA captures Inje (24 April) ====
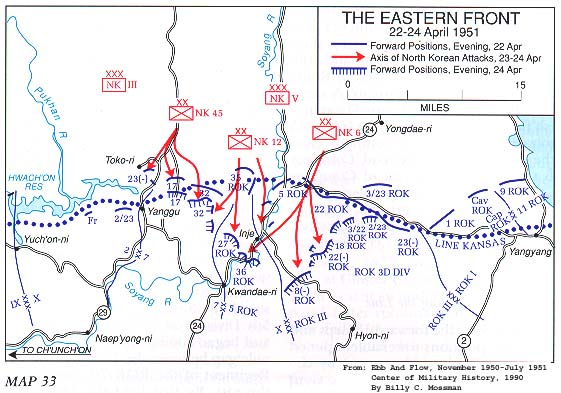
Spring offensive, eastern front

In the X Corps' sector to the east of the Marines, an attack opened near dawn on the 24th by the KPA 12th Division thoroughly disorganized the ROK 5th Division and carried the KPA through Inje by mid-morning. The KPA 6th Division at the same time continued to push the left and center units of ROK III Corps away from Route 24. The two KPA divisions reduced the pressure of their attacks only after their point units had driven 2–5 miles (3.2–8.0 km) below Inje. Given some respite, the ROK forces were able to organize defenses strong enough to hold off the two KPA divisions' continuing but weaker attempts to deepen and widen their salient. To the northeast, the KPA 45th Division again displayed its inexperience on the 24th in unsuccessful attacks on the US 32nd Infantry, 7th Division at the immediate left of the ROK 5th Division and against the 23rd Infantry, 2nd Division anchoring the X Corps’ west flank above the eastern tip of the Hwacheon Reservoir. Opposite the 23rd Infantry, some 400 troops of the 45th made the mistake of assembling in a steep-sided draw near the village of Tokko-ri in full view of an artillery forward observer with Company C. The observer brought down a battalion time on target barrage of fifteen volleys using rounds tipped with variable time fuses. Afterward the observer saw just two KPA come out of the draw. The only ground gained by the 45th Division during the day was when the 32nd Infantry pulled back to ridgetop positions that allowed it to tie in with the ROK 5th Division below Inje and thus contain the KPA salient along its southwestern shoulder.

As a result of the 1st Marine Division's withdrawal to the Kansas Line, Almond late on the 24th ordered changes in 2nd Division dispositions. On the morning of 25 April the 23rd Infantry was to drop back to positions just below the eastern tip of the Hwacheon Reservoir, a move that would place the regiment on the exact trace of the Kansas Line; beginning on the 25th General Clark L. Ruffner was to make daily physical contact with the Marine Division's right flank located near the village of Yuch’on-ni at the western tip of the reservoir. The latter step was a hedge against the possibility that enemy forces might penetrate the right of the Marine line and make a flanking or enveloping move against X Corps through the otherwise unoccupied ground below the reservoir. To screen this ground and maintain contact with the Marines, Ruffner organized Task Force Zebra under the commander of the division's 72nd Tank Battalion, Lt. Col. Elbridge L. Brubaker. Included in the task force were a platoon of tanks from the 72nd, the 2nd Reconnaissance Company, the division's attached Netherlands and French Battalions, and, later, the 1st Ranger Company. Almond on the morning of the 25th ordered an afternoon attack by the ROK 5th Division to retake Inje and the high ground immediately above the town as a first step in regaining the Kansas Line. As worked out by Almond with General Yu, the leftmost units of ROK III Corps were to join the advance. Yu's attack-for reasons not clear-did not materialize, and although the ROK 5th Division recaptured Inje, enemy pressure forced the unit to return to its original positions below the town. Almond planned to attack again on the 26th, but, as he would soon learn, any attempt to retake the Kansas Line was for the time being out of the question as a result of a second failing performance by the ROK 6th Division at Kapyong.

==== PVA attacks the Kansas Line (23–24 April) ====
Following the withdrawal of the US 24th and 25th Infantry Divisions the PVA finally reestablished contact with small, groping attacks near midnight on the 23rd. Almost at the same hour, far harder attacks struck the ROK 1st Division and British 29th Brigade along the Imjin, particularly their neighboring interior units, the 12th ROK Regiment and the British brigade's isolated Gloster battalion at Solma-ri. The midnight exploratory probes in the eastern half of the Corps' sector developed into strong but not overpowering daytime assaults by three divisions against the 24th Infantry on the right of the 25th Division and on the entire front of the 24th Division. The 179th Division seized Hill 664, the highest ground in the 24th Infantry sector, but failed in daylong attacks to dislodge the regiment and two reinforcing battalions of the 27th Infantry from a new line established in the foothills of the high feature. Forces of the 80th and 59th Divisions kept the 24th Division's front under pressure all day, but only the 80th attacking the 19th Infantry made any penetrations, all shallow. Counterattacks by regimental reserve forces eliminated all of them. Of more concern was a visible enemy buildup in front of the division, particularly ahead of the 21st Infantry on the right flank.

To the left of the Glosters, the 64th Army had shown little of the clumsiness with which its 192nd Division opened operations against the ROK 1st Division. Driving out of its shallow bridgehead inside the Imjin River's Korangp’o-ri bend at midnight on the 23rd, the 192nd Division slowly, but persistently, forced the 12th Regiment at the right of the ROK line to give ground. The pressure on the ROK increased around dawn, after the 190th Division crossed the Imjin at several points southwest of Korangp’o-ri town and sent units down the boundary between the ROK 11th and 12th Regiments. Also crossing the Imjin during the night in the Korangp’o-ri bend area, the 189th Division of the 63rd Army advanced southeast on a course taking it into the gap between the ROK 12th Regiment and the Gloster battalion on Hill 235. By noon a battalion leading the attack of the 190th Division drove a wedge more than 1 mile (1.6 km) deep between the 11th and 12th Regiments. General Kang countered by sending a tank-infantry force, two battalions of his reserve 15th ROK Regiment and Company A, 73rd Heavy Tank Battalion against the penetration. By evening the task force drove out the PVA and established defensive positions in the gap that had been opened between the 11th and 12th Regiments. By that time the 192nd Division had pressed back the 12th Regiment roughly 3 miles (4.8 km) to the southwest of its original positions, widening by the same distance the gap between the ROK division and the Gloster battalion on Hill 235. The 189th Division, after brushing the right flank of the 12th Regiment, meanwhile began passing through the widening gap between the ROK and Glosters. As the 12th Regiment gave ground during the afternoon, Milburn ordered his lone reserve, the US 15th Infantry, 3rd Division, out of its assembly on the northwest outskirts of Seoul into positions 6 miles (9.7 km) behind the ROK to block a secondary road, Route 1B, which if the PVA reached would afford them an easy path to Route 1 and Seoul. Milburn shortly diverted the 1st Battalion of the 15th to clear Route 2X, a lateral secondary road connecting Route 1 to Route 3 at Uijeongbu, after receiving a report that 250 infiltrating PVA had set up a roadblock about 7 miles (11 km) west of Uijeongbu. The 1st Battalion located the PVA force at 18:00, killing 20 before the remaining PVA broke away into nearby hills. With darkness approaching, the battalion commander elected to await morning before attempting to clear the surrounding area. Meanwhile, as Milburn committed his only reserve unit, air observers and agents working in the area along Route 1 above the Imjin reported enemy forces moving south toward the river. KPA I Corps appeared ready to open its supporting attack along the west flank of the main PVA drive.

Well before daylight on the 25th Milburn became convinced that I Corps would have to give up the Kansas Line. As suspected, KPA I Corps was joining the offensive, although its initial move ended abruptly when its 8th Division attempted to cross the Imjin over the railroad bridge near Munsan-ni and was blown back with high losses from artillery fire and air attacks. However the PVA 190th and 192nd Divisions attacking in strength just after midnight drove the ROK 1st Division back another 1 mile (1.6 km) before giving respite, widening still more the gap between the ROK and Glosters. The 189th Division continued, if slowly, to pass through the gap. Before midnight the entire front of the 3rd Division was under assault.

By dark on the 24th there had been no enemy action against the 7th Infantry deployed along Route 33 at the right of the 3rd Division. With the sector quiet, the 1st Battalion, 7th Infantry, had no difficulty in replacing the 3rd Battalion, 65th Infantry, at the center of the regimental front in mid-afternoon to allow the latter to join its regiment near the 29th British Brigade command post in preparation for the scheduled attack to relieve the Gloster battalion. But after unproductive opening attacks on the 65th Infantry and Philippine 10th Battalion Combat Team and a slow approach to the Kansas Line, the PVA 29th Division opened more effective assaults on the 7th Infantry between 20:00 and midnight of the 24th. Two regiments of the division attacking across the Hantan River hit all three battalions of the regiment. Hardest hit was the 2nd Battalion on the right flank, which by 02:30 on the 25th was surrounded. On orders of the regimental commander, the battalion gradually infiltrated south in small groups and reassembled some 4 miles (6.4 km) below the Kansas Line around daylight. The 1st and 3rd Battalions held their ground but remained under pressure throughout the night.

In the eastern half of the Corps' sector, the remainder of the PVA 29th Division, the 179th Division and the 81st Division opened and steadily intensified attacks on the 25th Division between dusk and midnight. Simultaneous with frontal assaults on the 35th Infantry at the left, forces of the 29th Division apparently coming out of the adjacent sector of the 7th Infantry to the west drew close enough to place fire on the regimental command post and supporting artillery units. On the right, PVA penetrated and scattered the 1st Battalion, 24th Infantry. Unable to restore the position, Bradley pulled the 24th Infantry and 27th Infantry onto a new line about 1 mile (1.6 km) to the south but gained no respite as the PVA followed closely.

In the 24th Division sector at Corps' right, two PVA companies infiltrated the positions of the 19th Infantry during the night. But a greater danger was posed by the 60th Division, which, after again routing the ROK 6th Division, reached and attacked the right flank of the 21st Infantry. The 21st bent its line and tied it to the position of its reserve battalion on the flank. But the 60th, if it should shift to the south past the refused flank and the blocking position set up by the battalion of the 5th Infantry, could slip into the division and Corps' rear area through the big opening created by the ROK 6th Division's second retreat. Because of this danger on his exposed right flank, the continuing and effective heavy pressure on the 25th Division, and the threat of a major enemy penetration through the wide gap between the ROK 1st Division and 3rd Division, Milburn at 05:00 on the 25th ordered a withdrawal to the Delta Line, which, as set out in previously prepared Corps' plans, lay 4–12 miles (6.4–19.3 km), west to east, below the Kansas Line. He instructed the 24th and 25th Divisions to begin their withdrawals at 08:00 but directed the ROK 1st Division and 3rd Division not to withdraw until the surrounded Gloster battalion had been extricated. He specifically instructed Soule to get the Glosters out before withdrawing, "even if you have to counterattack."

==== Kapyong (22–27 April) ====
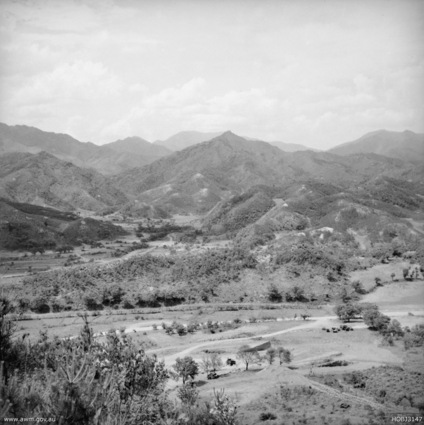
Kapyŏng River, South Korea. This area witnessed one of the offensive's engagements during the Battle of Kapyong.

In the Kapyong sector, the offensive saw the 27th British Commonwealth Brigade establish blocking positions in the Kapyong Valley, also one of the key routes south to the capital, Seoul. The two forward battalions—3rd Battalion, Royal Australian Regiment (3 RAR) and 2nd Battalion, Princess Patricia's Canadian Light Infantry (2 PPCLI)—occupied positions astride the valley and hastily developed defences on 23 April. As thousands of ROK soldiers began to withdraw through the valley, the PVA infiltrated the brigade position under the cover of darkness, and assaulted the 3 RAR on Hill 504 during the evening and into the following day. Although heavily outnumbered, the 27th Brigade held their positions into the afternoon before the 3 RAR withdrew to positions in the rear of the brigade on the evening of 24 April, with both sides having suffered heavy casualties. The PVA then turned their attention to the 2 PPCLI on Hill 677, now surrounded and without resupply of ammunition or medical equipment. During a fierce night battle the PVA were unable to dislodge the 2 PPCLI and sustained enormous casualties, mostly from artillery fire directed onto the 2 PPCLI positions from 16 New Zealand Field Regiment about five miles distant. The fighting helped blunt the PVA offensive and the actions of the 2 PPCLI and the 3 RAR at Kapyong prevented a breakthrough on the United Nations Command central front, the potential encirclement of US forces in Korea, and ultimately the capture of Seoul. The two battalions of about 700 men each bore the brunt of the assault and stopped two PVA divisions, a total of about 20,000 men, during the hard-fought defensive battle. On late 25 April, the PVA largely withdrew back up the valley to their north, in order to regroup for the second impulse of the offensive.

==== Withdrawal to the Delta Line (25 April) ====
With the Yongp’yong River at its back, the US 25th Infantry Division faced a canalized withdrawal over two bridges in the southeastern corner of its sector, one on Route 3, the other at Yongp’yong town 2 miles (3.2 km) to the west. Earlier, after the PVA had captured Hill 664 3 miles (4.8 km) directly north of the Route 3 crossing, Bradley had set the 3rd Battalion, 27th Infantry, in a blocking position above the bridge. For the withdrawal he ordered all of the 27th Infantry to cover both river crossings while first the 24th Infantry and then the 35th Infantry pulled back, the 24th using the Route 3 bridge, the 35th using the crossing at Yongp’yong town. To cover the withdrawing 27th Infantry, Bradley deployed his attached Turkish Brigade along Route 3 5 miles (8.0 km) below the Yongp’yong River. Despite the difficulty of withdrawing while heavily engaged, Bradley's forces succeeded in breaking contact with small losses. By early evening the 27th Infantry and 35th Infantry were deployed on the Delta Line, left to right, with the Turkish Brigade and 24th Infantry assembled close behind the line.

In the 24th Division sector, Bryan deployed the 5th Infantry along secondary Route 3A 3 miles (4.8 km) behind the Kansas Line to cover the withdrawal of the 19th and 21st Regiments. Attached to the 5th in support were the 555th Field Artillery Battalion and Company D, 6th Medium Tank Battalion. Also directed by Bryan to join the covering force was the 8th Ranger Company, which, as an attachment to the 21st Infantry, had been patrolling to the east in search of PVA coming out of the IX Corps' sector and currently was in an isolated position atop Hill 1010 about 0.5 miles (0.80 km) off the right flank of the 21st. But before the Rangers could make their move, they were surrounded and attacked by forces of the PVA 60th Division. The 3rd Battalion, 5th Infantry, which Bryan earlier had placed in a blocking position along his east flank, meanwhile observed PVA moving south and west past its position. The 60th Division obviously had found and was moving into the open flank. First the 19th Infantry, then the 21st Infantry, broke contact and withdrew without difficulty. By 18:30 both regiments were in position on the Delta Line and were deployed as before, the 19th on the left, the 21st on the right. Once on the Delta Line, the 21st Infantry was engaged by PVA moving in from the northeast but turned back these forces with no loss of ground. Later in the evening the 21st made contact with the ROK 6th Division, which Hoge had managed to redeploy at the left of the IX Corps' sector of the Delta Line. Lt. Col. Arthur H. Wilson, Jr., the 5th Infantry commander, was forced to delay his withdrawal until the 8th Ranger Company, which was attempting to fight its way out of its encircled position, reached him. To assist the attempt, Wilson sent five tanks toward Hill 1010. En route, the tankers met and took aboard 65 Rangers, most of them wounded. They were all who had survived the breakout attempt. It was late afternoon before the tankers returned with the Rangers and Wilson got his forces in march order for withdrawing down Route 3A through the positions of the 19th Infantry and into an assembly area four miles behind the Delta Line. The 3rd Battalion led the way south, followed by the 555th Field Artillery Battalion, 1st Battalion, 2nd Battalion, and, as rearguard, Company D, 6th Medium Tank Battalion. A few mortar rounds exploded around the 3rd Battalion as it cleared a defile about 0.5 miles (0.80 km) from the Delta Line. Battalion members assumed that these were registration rounds fired by the 19th Infantry. Actually, they were the opening shots of a large PVA force occupying the ridges along both sides of the road from the defile north for more than 1 mile (1.6 km). A crescendo of PVA small arms, machine gun, recoilless rifle and mortar fire brought the remainder of Wilson's column to an abrupt halt and began to take a toll of men, weapons, and vehicles. Hardest hit was the 555th Field Artillery Battalion. Its return fire, including direct fire from its howitzers, silenced the PVA along the west side of the road; but the fire from obviously larger numbers of PVA on the east side grew in volume and kept most of Wilson's column pinned down. Three attacks by forces of the 1st Battalion were broken up, as was an attempt by the 2nd Battalion to deploy. An attack from the south by Company A, 6th Medium Tank Battalion and a company from the 19th Infantry failed at the narrow lower end of the defile at a cost of two tanks and the infantrymen riding them. Searching for a way around the roadblock, rearguard tankers from Company D meanwhile found a track branching west off Route 3A 1 mile (1.6 km) north of the defile and a connecting road leading south to be free of PVA. Moving out under continuing fire, but not pursued by the PVA, Wilson's forces followed the roundabout route and escaped without further losses, reaching the lines of the 19th Infantry shortly after dark. During the night, aircraft and artillery bombarded the weapons, vehicles, and equipment left behind: seven tanks, five from Company D, 6th Medium Tank Battalion, and two from the 5th Infantry's regimental tank company; 11 howitzers from the 555th Field Artillery Battalion; and a host of trucks, more than 60 from the 555th alone. The artillerymen also suffered the most personnel casualties. The initial count was 100 killed, wounded and missing, a figure somewhat reduced later as stragglers regained 24th Division lines over the next two days.

==== Withdrawal to the No-Name Line (26–28 April) ====
Milburn intended to make no stubborn or prolonged defense of the Delta Line. He considered it only a phase line to be occupied briefly in the I Corps’ withdrawal to the Golden Line. He planned to mark out additional phase lines between Delta and Golden so that in each step of the withdrawal displacing artillery units would remain within range of the line being vacated and could provide continuous support to infantry units as they withdrew. Each move to the rear was to be made in daylight so that any enemy forces following the withdrawal could be hit most effectively with artillery fire and air strikes. Milburn ordered the next withdrawal at midmorning on the 26th after attacks opened during the night by KPA I Corps and PVA XIX Army Group made inroads along the western portion of his Delta front. Hardest hit were the ROK 11th Regiment, 1st Division along Route 1 and the US 65th Infantry at the left of the 3rd Division. The PVA also entered a 5 miles (8.0 km) gap between the ROK 1st and US 3rd Divisions but made no immediate attempt to move deep. The next position to be occupied by I Corps lay 2–5 miles (3.2–8.0 km) below the Delta Line, generally on a line centered on and slightly above Uijeongbu.

Hoge ordered conforming adjustments of the IX Corps' line. The ROK 6th Division was to withdraw and tie in with the new right flank of the I Corps. Eastward, the British 28th Brigade was to reoccupy the hill masses previously held by the Canadians and Australians above Kapyong; the 1st Marine Division was to pull back from the Kansas Line to positions straddling the Pukhan, running through the northern outskirts of Chuncheon, and following the lower bank of the Soyang River. Since the Marines' withdrawal otherwise would leave X Corps with an open left flank, Almond was obliged to order the US 2nd and 7th Divisions away from the Hwacheon Reservoir and the west shoulder of the KPA salient in the Inje area. The new line to be occupied by Almond's forces looped northeast from a junction with the 1st Marine Division along the Soyang to a point 2 miles (3.2 km) below Yanggu, then fell off to the southeast to the existing position of the ROK 5th Division below Inje.

Although the I Corps' withdrawal, and thus the chain reaction eastward, was prompted by the heavy enemy pressure in the Corps' western sector, there was evidence by 26 April that the main effort of the enemy offensive was beginning to falter. Enemy killed by infantry and artillery fire and air strikes on the I Corps' front were estimated to number almost 48,000, approximately the strength of five divisions. Intelligence information indicated that the stand of the Gloster Battalion against forces of the 63rd Army and the early fumbling of the 64th Army had upset the attack schedule of the XIX Army Group and that the group commander was committing the 65th Army in an attempt to save the situation. But in this and other commitments of reserves, according to prisoner of war interrogations, enemy commanders were confused and their orders vague. With only the west sector of the Eighth Army front under any serious threat, and that beginning to show signs of lessening, Van Fleet on the 26th established an additional trans-peninsula defense line that in the central and eastern sectors lay well north of the Nevada Line, the final line set out in the 12 April withdrawal plan. The new line incorporated the fortifications of the Golden Line arching above the outskirts of Seoul. Eastward, it bulged across the Pukhan River 5 miles (8.0 km) above its confluence with the Han, then turned steeply northeast, crossing Route 29 10 miles (16 km) below Chuncheon and cutting Route 24 15 miles (24 km) south of Inje. Continuing to angle northeast, the line touched the east coast just above Yangyang. Implicit in Van Fleet's insistence on thorough coordination between Corps during the withdrawal to the new line was that its occupation would be governed by the movement of US I Corps against the continuing PVA pressure on its front. Van Fleet's assignment of Corps' sectors along the line made US IX Corps responsible for defending the Pukhan and Han corridors; consequently, the US 24th Infantry Division, currently located directly above that area, was to pass to IX Corps control on the 27th. When, contrary to custom, Van Fleet gave the line no name, it became known as the No-Name Line.

Of concern to Van Fleet after US I Corps pulled back from the Imjin was the possibility that PVA/KPA forces would cross the Han River estuary unseen west of Munsan-ni and sweep down the Kimpo peninsula behind Seoul, overrunning Inchon, Kimpo Airfield and Seoul airport in the process. On 25 April he had asked the commander of the west coast group of the United States Navy Task Force 95 to keep the possible crossing site under surveillance, and on the 26th planes from the group's carriers began to fly over the area while in transit to and from close support targets. The cruiser USS Toledo meanwhile steamed for the Inchon area from the Sea of Japan to provide gunfire support.

PVA/KPA forces reaching the I Corps' phase line after dark on the 26th attacked in each division sector except that of the 24th on the Corps' right. On the front of the 25th Division, the PVA concentrated an assault between two companies of the 27th Infantry, some reaching as far as 1 mile (1.6 km) behind the line before regimental reserves contained them. A radar-directed bomb strike brought down at the point of penetration and ground fire delivered under light provided by a flare ship eliminated the PVA force. In a repetition of the pattern of PVA/KPA attacks on I Corps' Delta front the previous night, the hardest assaults struck the ROK 1st Division and 65th Infantry at the left of the 3rd Division's position west of Uijeongbu. Artillery fire and air strikes helped contain penetrations of the 65th's line and forced the PVA to withdraw. PVA attacking the 15th Regiment at the right of the ROK 1st Division's line forced a 2 miles (3.2 km) withdrawal before the ROK were able to block the advance. KPA attacking down Route 1 against the 11th Regiment and against the tank destroyer battalion west of the road broke through the lines of both units and took a particularly high toll of tank destroyer troops before ROK counterattacks supported by US tanks stopped the advance.

At 06:00 on the 27th, the 24th Division passed to IX Corps' control, as had been directed by Van Fleet, and what had been the boundary between the 24th and 25th Divisions became the new Corps' boundary. Shortly afterward, Milburn ordered his remaining forces to withdraw to the next phase line, which would be the last occupied by I Corps before it moved onto the Golden Line. West to east, the phase line lay 1–7 miles (1.6–11.3 km) above the Golden Line, touching the Han near the village of Haengju located almost due north of Kimpo airfield below the river, cutting Route 1 and a minor road from the north near the village of Kup’abal-li, crossing Route 3 4 miles (6.4 km) south of Uijeongbu, and also intersecting a minor road along the new Corps boundary that below the phase line and the Golden Line joined Route 2 reaching Seoul from the east. Following suit, Hoge ordered back the left of IX Corps. The 24th Division, to which Hoge attached the ROK 6th Division and British 28th Brigade, was to take position adjoining the new I Corps' line and stretching along the lower bank of the Pukhan toward the Chuncheon-Soyang River position of the 1st Marine Division.

On I Corps' right, the two line regiments of the 25th Division had some difficulty in getting off the first phase line. The 27th Infantry ran into enemy groups that had got behind the regiment during the night, and PVA closely following the 35th Infantry took that regiment under assault when it set up a covering position to help the 27th Infantry disengage. It was well into the afternoon before the two regiments could break away. Bradley deployed the same two regiments on the second phase line. In preparation for further withdrawal, Bradley set the Turkish Brigade in a covering position midway between the phase line and the Golden Line and assembled the 24th Infantry behind the Golden Line fortifications.

On the 26th Milburn had reinforced the US 3rd Division with the US 7th Cavalry Regiment. In preparation for the withdrawal on the 27th, Soule deployed the 7th Cavalry at the left rear of the division as a precaution which proved fortuitous against a flanking attack by XIX Army Group forces who were continuing to press hard against the adjacent ROK 15th Regiment, 1st Division. The cavalrymen fended off a PVA attack from the northeast that lasted into the afternoon. Along the second phase line, Soule meanwhile deployed his 7th and 15th Regiments at center and right and assembled the 65th Infantry in reserve. He later set the 7th Cavalry on line at the left. The continuing pressure kept the ROK 1st Division pinned in position until late afternoon, then diminished enough to allow the ROK to begin the difficult task of disengaging while under attack. Enemy forces, however, failed to follow the withdrawal. Along the second phase line, Kang deployed the 11th, 15th and 12th Regiments west to east and set out screening forces well to the front. Enemy forces did not regain contact during the night. Milburn nevertheless expected an eventual follow up in strength and ordered his forces to occupy the Golden Line on the 28th. Again in chain reaction, Milburn's withdrawal order set in motion the move to the No-Name Line by UN forces to the east.

From the outset of the offensive Van Fleet had believed that a strong effort should be made to retain possession of Seoul, not only to gain the tactical advantage in maintaining a foothold above the Han River, but also to prevent psychological damage to the Korean people. To give up the capital a third time, he believed, "would ruin the spirit of the nation." His determination to fight for the city lay behind his refusal to allow the Eighth Army simply to surrender ground in deep withdrawals and behind his order of 23 April directing a strong stand on the Kansas Line. Defeated in the latter effort, mainly by the failures of the ROK 6th Division, he had laid out the No-Name Line in the belief that a successful defense of its segment along the Pukhan corridor would improve his chances of holding Seoul and that the corridor area could be used as a springboard to recapture the capital if the forces defending the city itself were pushed out. In the central and eastern sectors, where enemy attacks had clearly lost their momentum by 26 April, the occupation of the No-Name Line would obviate relinquishing territory voluntarily, as was the case with the withdrawal to the Nevada Line as prescribed in the 12 April withdrawal plan.

Convinced by the morning of the 28th that the main enemy effort in the west was wearing out, Van Fleet informed Corps commanders that he intended to hold firmly on the No-Name Line. They were to conduct an active defense of the line, making full use of artillery in conjunction with armored counterattacks. Though members of his staff considered it a tactical mistake to risk having forces trapped against the north bank of the Han, Van Fleet insisted that there would be no withdrawal from the line unless extreme enemy pressure clearly imperiled Eighth Army positions, and then only if he himself ordered it. In case Van Fleet had to call a withdrawal from the No-Name Line, Eighth Army was to retire to the Waco Line, a move which would still hold the bulk of the army well above the Nevada Line. In the west, the Waco Line followed the Nevada trace along the lower bank of the Han; in the central and eastern areas, it lay 9–18 miles (14–29 km) below the No-Name Line. Van Fleet issued instructions for occupying the Waco Line "For planning purposes only," late on the 28th.

As I Corps' forces began their withdrawal to the Golden Line at midmorning on the 28th, KPA in regimental strength were sighted massing near Haengju, the Han River village above Kimpo airfield, apparently in preparation for crossing the river. The massed fire of two artillery battalions and 8-inch fire from the USS Toledo, now stationed just off Inchon, inflicted heavy casualties on the KPA and forced the survivors to withdraw. A PVA battalion attacking the 7th Cavalry below Uijeongbu early in the morning, but soon breaking contact after failing to penetrate and patrols investigating the positions of the 25th Division around noon were the only other enemy actions along the I Corps' front during the day.

The ROK 1st Division, which had scarcely more than 1 mile (1.6 km) to withdraw, reached the Golden Line early in the day. Assigned a narrow sector from the Han to a point just short of Route 1, Kang was able to hold his 12th Regiment and tank destroyer battalion in reserve. The 11th and 15th Regiments manning the Golden fortifications were able to use a battalion each in outpost lines, organizing these units about 2 miles (3.2 km) to the northwest. Behind the 3rd Division, the US 1st Cavalry Division occupied Golden positions between and including Routes 1 and 3. Milburn ordered Soule to return the 7th Cavalry to the 1st Cavalry Division, to assemble the 3rd Division less the 65th Infantry in Seoul in Corps' reserve, and to prepare counterattack plans. Milburn attached the 65th Infantry to the 25th Division so that Bradley, using the 65th and his own reserve, the 24th Infantry, could man the eastern sector of the Golden Line while the remainder of his division was withdrawing.

==== Defending the No-Name Line (28–30 April) ====
As deployed for the defense of Seoul by evening of the 28th, I Corps had six regiments on line and the same number assembled in and on the edges of the city. Below the Han to meet any enemy attempt to envelop Seoul were the British 29th Brigade at the base of the Kimpo peninsula in the west and the Turkish Brigade on the east flank. With adequate reserves, fortified defenses, and a narrower front that allowed heavier concentrations of artillery fire, the Corps was in a position far stronger than any it had occupied since the beginning of the offensive. In contrast, there was further evidence that the enemy's offensive strength was weakening. The most recent prisoners taken had only one day's rations or none at all. Interrogation of these captives revealed that local foraging produced very little food and that resupply had collapsed under the Far East Air Forces' interdiction of enemy rear areas. The steady air attacks also had seriously impeded the forward movement of artillery. Confusion and disorganization among enemy forces appeared to be increasing. Commanders were issuing only such general instructions as "go to Seoul" and "go as far to the south as possible." On one occasion, according to prisoners, reserve forces ordered forward moved south under the impression that Seoul already had fallen. One factor in the deterioration was a high casualty rate among political officers-especially at company level-on whom the PVA depended so heavily for maintaining troop motivation and discipline.

The KPA 8th Division assisted on its left by PVA in what appeared to be regimental strength struck the outpost line of the ROK 1st Division shortly before midnight on the 28th. Accurate defensive fire, especially from tanks, artillery, and the guns of the USS Toledo, broke up the attack before enemy assault forces could get through the outpost line and reach the main ROK positions. Tank-infantry forces sent out by Kang after daylight followed and fired on retreating enemy groups for 2 miles (3.2 km), observing 900-1000 KPA/PVA dead along the route. The 8th Division's attack proved to be the only serious enemy attempt to break through the Golden Line fortifications. Another effort appeared to be in the offing during the day of the 29th when patrols and air observers reported a large enemy buildup on the front of the 25th Division, but heavy artillery fire and air attacks delivered after dark broke up the enemy force. Division patrols searching the enemy concentration area after daylight on the 30th found an estimated 1000 enemy dead. Across the Corps' front, patrols moving as much as 6 miles (9.7 km) above the Golden Line on the 30th made only minor contacts. On the basis of the patrol findings, Milburn reported to Van Fleet that the enemy forces on his front were staying out of artillery range while regrouping and resupplying for further attacks. Actually a general PVA/KPA withdrawal was beginning.

==== Assessing the First Phase ====
In dropping back to the No-Name Line, Eighth Army forces since 22 April had given up about 35 miles (56 km) of territory in the I and IX Corps sectors and about 20 miles (32 km) in the sectors of X and ROK III Corps. Logistical planning completed in anticipation of the enemy offensive had kept line units well furnished with all classes of supplies during the attacks and at the same time had prevented any loss of stocks stored in major supply points during the withdrawal. Gearing removal operations to the phased rearward movements, service forces had shifted supplies and equipment southward to predetermined locations from which line units could be readily resupplied without risking the loss of supply points to advancing enemy forces. Steady rail movements and back loading aboard ships had all but cleared Inchon of supplies by the 30th and LSTs were standing by to take aboard the 2nd Engineer Special Brigade and 10,000 South Koreans who had been operating the port. Against the possibility that Inch’on would have to be given up, Ridgway on the 30th took steps to forestall a repetition of the heavy damage done to the port when it was abandoned in January, damage that had served only to hinder use of the port after it was recaptured in March. Ridgway instructed Van Fleet not to demolish port facilities if it became necessary to evacuate Inchon again, but to leave it to UN naval forces to prevent the enemy from using the port.

Among US Army divisions, casualties suffered between 22 and 29 April totaled 314 killed and 1,600 wounded. In both number and rate, these losses were scarcely more than half the casualties suffered among the divisions engaged for a comparable period of time during the PVA Second Phase Offensive. Among a variety of estimates, an Eighth Army headquarters report for the eight-day period from evening of the 22nd to evening of the 30th listed 13,349 known enemy dead, 23,829 estimated enemy dead and 246 taken captive. This report included information obtained daily from UN ground units only. At UN headquarters in Tokyo, the estimate was that enemy forces suffered between 75,000 and 80,000 killed and wounded, 50,000 of these in the Seoul sector. Other estimates listed 71,712 enemy casualties on the I Corps' front and 8,009 in the IX Corps sector. Although none of the estimates was certifiable, PVA/KPA losses were unquestionably huge. Notwithstanding the high enemy losses, Van Fleet cautioned on 1 May that the enemy had the men to "Attack again as hard as before or harder." The total strength of PVA forces in Korea as of that date was believed to be about 542,000 and that of KPA forces to be over 197,000. The 1 May estimate in Ridgway's headquarters credited the PVA/KPA with having 300,000 men currently in position to attack, most of these on the central front.

=== Interregnum (1–14 May) ===
Intent on confronting PVA/KPA forces with the most formidable defenses yet, on 30 April Van Fleet ordered the length of the No-Name Line fortified like its Golden Line segment around Seoul. Fortifications were to include log and sandbag bunkers, multiple bands of barbed wire with antipersonnel mines interspersed, and 55-gallon drums of Napalm mixed with gasoline set out in front of defensive positions and rigged for detonation from the bunkers. Van Fleet also wanted provision made for counterattacking quickly once the enemy had been turned back.

Van Fleet expected the PVA/KPA's next principal effort to come either in the west, as had the main force of the April attacks, or on his central front. Judging the Uijeongbu-Seoul, Pukhan River and Chuncheon-Hongcheon corridors to be the most likely axes of advance, he shifted forces by 4 May to place most of his strength and all US divisions in the western and central sectors and aligned I, IX and X Corps so that each was responsible for one of these avenues. Deployed around Seoul, I Corps blocked the Uijeongbu approach with the ROK 1st, 1st Cavalry, and 25th Divisions on line and the 3rd Division and British 29th Brigade in reserve. IX Corps, its sector narrowed by a westward shift of its right boundary, now had the British 28th Brigade, 24th Division, ROK 2d Division, ROK 6th Division and 7th Division west to east on the No-Name Line and the 187th Airborne Regimental Combat Team in reserve for defense against an enemy strike down or out of the Pukhan River valley. In the left portion of the X Corps' sector, the 1st Marine Division and the 2nd Division, less the bulk of the 23rd Infantry in Corps' reserve, covered the Chuncheon-Hongcheon axis. Though the concentration of strength in the western and central areas left the remainder of the front comparatively thin, Van Fleet believed that the six ROK divisions in the east-the 5th and 7th in the right portion of the X Corps' sector, the 9th and 3rd in the ROK III Corps' sector, and the Capital and 11th in the ROK I Corps' sector, could hold the line since opposing KPA forces were weak and the terrain barriers of the higher Taebaek Mountains favored defense.

Along with his 30 April instructions for the defense of the No-Name Line, Van Fleet ordered intensive patrolling to locate and identify PVA/KPA formations as they continued to move out of contact. Patrols searching 3–5 miles (4.8–8.0 km) above the front during the first two days of May, however, encountered no major PVA/KPA force except at the I Corps' left where ROK 1st Division patrols found the KPA 8th Division deployed along Route 1. To deepen the search in the west and central areas, Van Fleet ordered patrol bases set up 5–6 miles (8.0–9.7 km) out along a line reaching east as far as Route 24 in the X Corps' sector. Each division fronted by this line was to establish a regimental combat team in a base position organized for perimeter defense. Patrols operating from the bases could work farther north with full fire support, and the forward positions would deepen the defense in the sectors where Van Fleet expected to be most heavily attacked. While the fortification of the No-Name Line continued, the front east of Route 24 was to be advanced 6–15 miles (9.7–24.1 km) to the Missouri Line, both to restore contact and to clear a stretch of Route 24 and a connecting secondary road angling east to the coast for use as a supply route by the ROK divisions defending the sector. Van Fleet also directed a foray to destroy KPA forces in the I Corps' west sector after the 8th Division stopped short the ROK 12th Regiment, 1st Division's attempt to establish a patrol base up Route 1 on 4 May.

The six ROK divisions in the east opened the advance toward the Missouri Line on 7 May. Along the coast, ROK I Corps' forces met almost no opposition, and on the 9th the ROK 11th Division's tank destroyer battalion advanced some 16 miles (26 km) beyond the Missouri Line to occupy the town of Kansong, where Route 24 ended in a junction with the coastal highway. Forces of the ROK 5th Division on the left flank of the advance in the X Corps' zone reached the Missouri Line the same day. The other four divisions, though still as much as 10 miles (16 km) short of the line on the 9th, had made long daily gains against scattered delaying forces. In the west, the bulk of the ROK 1st Division advancing up Route 1 between 7 and 9 May levered KPA forces out of successive positions and finally forced them into a general withdrawal. Setting the 15th Regiment in a patrol base 6 miles (9.7 km) up Route 1, Kang pulled his remaining forces back into his No-Name Line fortifications.

From other bases in the I, IX and X Corps' sectors, patrols doubled the depth of their previous reconnaissance, but had no more success in making firm contact than had patrols working from the No-Name Line. Available intelligence in-formation indicated that the PVA 64th, 12th, 60th and 20th Armies were completely off the west and west central fronts for refurbishing and that each of the four armies still in those sectors, the 65th 63rd, 15th and 27th, had only one division forward as a screen while remaining divisions prepared to resume the offensive. Since there were no firm indications that the resumption was an immediate prospect, however, Van Fleet on 9 May issued plans for returning the Eighth Army to the Kansas Line. In the first phase of the return I, IX and X Corps were to attack, tentatively on the 12th, towards the Topeka Line running from Munsan-ni east through Chuncheon, then northeast toward Inje. ROK III Corps and ROK I Corps in the east meanwhile were to continue their attack to the Missouri Line, a step which would carry them above the Kansas Line.

Van Fleet decided against the Topeka Line advance on the 11th after changes in the intelligence picture indicated that PVA/KPA forces were within a few days of reopening their offensive. Air observation of enemy troops where none previously had been seen suggested forward movements under cover of darkness, reports told of large enemy reconnaissance patrols, and both agents and prisoners alleged an early resumption of the offensive. Extensive smoke screens rose north of the 38th Parallel ahead of IX Corps and above the Hwacheon Reservoir in the X Corps' sector. Drawing Van Fleet's particular notice were reports that five PVA armies, the 60th, 15th, 12th, 27th and 20th, were massing west of the Pukhan for a major attack in the west central sector. In further instructions for defense, Van Fleet ordered the No-Name Line fortifications improved and directed Hoge to give special attention to the Pukhan corridor, where the heaviest enemy buildup was reported. Hoge was to place the bulk of IX Corps' artillery on that flank. "I want to stop the Chinese here and hurt him," Van Fleet told Hoge. "I welcome his attack and want to be strong enough in position and fire power to defeat him." Lavish artillery fire, in particular, was to be used. If gun positions could be kept supplied with ammunition, Van Fleet wanted five times the normal day of fire expended against enemy attacks. As calculated by his G-4, Colonel Stebbins, the "Van Fleet day of fire" could be supported for at least seven days, although transportation could become a problem since Stebbins could not haul other supplies while handling that amount of ammunition. Rations and petroleum products already stocked in Corps' sectors, however, would last for more than seven days.

Immediate army reserves for the advance to the Topeka Line were to have been the 3rd Division, to be withdrawn from I Corps, and the Canadian 25th Infantry Brigade, which had reached Korea on 5 May. Having undergone extensive training at Fort Lewis, Washington, the brigade would be ready to join operations after brief tune-up exercises in the Pusan area. Though the Topeka advance was off, Van Fleet ordered the Canadians to move north, beginning on 15 May, to Kumnyangjang-ni, 25 miles (40 km) southeast of Seoul, and prepare to counter any enemy penetration in the Pukhan or Seoul-Suwon corridors. The 3rd Division was still to pass to army reserve and organize forces capable of reinforcing or counterattacking in the I, IX or X Corps sectors in at least regimental combat team strength on six hours’ notice. Beginning on the 11th, the 15th Regimental Combat Team assembled near Ich’on, at the intersection of Routes 13 and 20 35 miles (56 km) southeast of Seoul, ready to move on call into the X Corps' sector; for operations in support of IX Corps, the 65th Regimental Combat Team assembled near Kyongan-ni, 20 miles (32 km) southeast of Seoul and directly below the Pukhan River corridor; and the 7th Regimental Combat Team assembled in Seoul for missions in the I Corps' sector.

The six ROK divisions on the eastern front were to stay forward of the No-Name Line but were not to make further attempt to occupy the Missouri Line In the X Corps sector, the ROK 5th and 7th Divisions, whose forces had all but reached the Soyang River southwest of Inje, were to fortify their present positions. ROK III Corps and ROK I Corps were to set their four divisions in fortified defenses between the lower bank of the Soyang south of Inje and the town of Kangson-ni, 5 miles (8.0 km) north of Yang-yang on the coast, after conducting spoiling attacks on 12 May in the two principal communications centers ahead of them, Inje and Yongdae-ri, the latter located on Route 24 5 miles (8.0 km) northeast of Inje. The reconnaissance company of the ROK 9th Division already had entered Inje without a fight during the afternoon of the 11th and dispersed an enemy force about 1 mile (1.6 km) beyond the town before retiring on the 12th, but other forces of the two ROK corps were prevented by distance and moderate resistance from reaching the objectives of their attacks in the one day allotted for them.

Light contact along the remainder of the front revealed little about PVA/KPA dispositions, but the composite of reports from air observers, agents, civilians, and prisoners made clear by 13 May that major PVA forces had begun to shift eastward from the west and west-central sectors. Steady rain and fog all but eliminated further air observation on 14 and 15 May; poor visibility also hampered ground patrols; and a IX Corps' reconnaissance-in-force by the 187th Airborne Regimental Combat Team up the valley northeast of Kapyong toward what was believed to be a large concentration of enemy forces had to be cancelled shortly after it started on the 15th because of the rain and poor road conditions. As much as could be determined by 16 May was that the eastward shift probably extended to the Chuncheon area. A few reports tracing the shift indicated that some PVA units would move beyond Chuncheon. According to a PVA medical officer captured northeast of Seoul on 10 May, the 12th Army and two other armies were scheduled to leave the west central area late on the 10th, march east for four days, then attack the US 2nd Division and the ROK divisions on the eastern front. Another captive taken on the 13th in the same general area said that the 15th Army was to march east for three days and attack the 2nd Division in conjunction with KPA attacks on the ROK front. Large enemy groups reported by X Corps' observers to be moving east as far as Yanggu on the 11th and 12th were believed to be PVA, and a deserter from the engineer battalion of the 80th Division, 27th Army, picked up on the 13th in the Chuncheon area stated that his battalion had been bridging the Pukhan. The X Corps intelligence officer believed it most likely, however, that the forces moving east of the Pukhan as far as Yanggu were from the 39th Army or 40th Army, both of which had been in the east central sector for some time. In any event, he considered major PVA operations on the eastern front to be impracticable. Given the logistical difficulties the PVA experienced in supporting offensive operations even in the Seoul area, where the distance to their rear supply bases was shortest and where the roads were more numerous and in better condition than anywhere else, he doubted that they would commit a large force in the eastern mountains where a supply line could not be maintained and where living off the land would be almost impossible. The Eighth Army intelligence staff as of 16 May had no corroborating evidence of the reported movement east of the Pukhan and even had some doubt that the PVA shift extended as far east as Chuncheon.

According to the consensus of current estimates of PVA/KPA dispositions as of the 16th, KPA I Corps on the west had spread forces eastward toward Route 33, taking over ground previously occupied by the PVA XIX Army Group. The 65th Army astride Route 33 north of Uijeongbu and the 63rd Army in the adjacent ground to the east formed the new front of the XIX Army Group. Reports placed the 64th Army northwest of the 65th. West to east, the 60th, 15th and 12th Armies were believed to occupy the new front of the III Army Group from a point above the Pukhan River in the vicinity of Kapyong eastward almost to Chuncheon. More tentatively located, the 20th and 27th Armies of the IX Army Group were reported to be off the front in the area north of Chuncheon and the group's 26th Army possibly in the same vicinity. The XIII Army Group apparently was still on the east central front, its 40th Army astride Route 17 just above Chuncheon and the 39th Army next to the east with its bulk between the Hwacheon Reservoir and the Soyang River and light forces occupying a bridgehead below the Soyang between Chuncheon and the river town of Naep’yong-ni some 10 miles (16 km) upstream to the northeast. On the basis of these dispositions, Van Fleet continued to believe that the main enemy effort would come in the west central sector, probably toward the Han River corridor, and would be made by five armies, the 60th, 15th, 12th, 27th and 20th. He also anticipated strong attacks toward Seoul over Route 1 and through the Uijeongbu corridor as well as another on the Chuncheon-Hongcheon axis.

=== Second offensive (15–22 May) ===
Even though the PVA forces lost the strategic initiative after the first offensive per Peng's reports, Mao still insisted that the second phase of the offensive be carried out. On 15 May 1951, the PVA Command recommenced the Second Spring Offensive and attacked the ROK and US X Corps in the east at the Soyang River with 150,000 men. After taking the Hwacheon Reservoir and gaining initial success, they were halted by 20 May.

== Aftermath ==
The spring offensive would be the last all-out offensive operation of the PVA for the duration of the war. Their objective to permanently drive the UN out of Korea had failed. The UN soon launched its May–June 1951 counteroffensive which erased all gains of the spring offensive and returned the UN forces to Line Kansas approximately 2–6 miles (3.2–9.7 km) north of the 38th Parallel, while some UN units advanced further north. A series of smaller offensives north of Seoul in October 1951 followed as the UN established the Jamestown Line as the main line of resistance.

The presence of UN forces at the northeast of the 38th Parallel, prompted the PVA Command to plan a limited offensive dubbed the "Sixth Phase Campaign". But the armistice negotiations that began on 10 July 1951 at Kaesong forced both sides to dig in at their respective positions across the 38th Parallel.

== See also ==
- Operation Dauntless
- UN May–June 1951 counteroffensive
- Gloucestershire Regiment

== Bibliography ==
- Appleman, Roy (1990). Ridgway Duels for Korea. Military History Series. Vol. 18. College Station, Texas: Texas A&M University Press. ISBN 978-0-89096-432-3.
- Coulthard-Clark, Chris (2001). The Encyclopaedia of Australia's Battles (Second ed.). Crows Nest, New South Wales: Allen and Unwin. ISBN 978-1-86508-634-7.
- Hu, Guang Zheng (胡光正); Ma, Shan Ying (马善营) (1987). Chinese People's Volunteer Army Order of Battle (中国人民志愿军序列) (in Chinese). Beijing: Chinese People's Liberation Army Publishing House. OCLC 298945765.
- Offner, Arnold A. (2002). Another Such Victory: President Truman and the Cold War, 1945–1953. Stanford, CA: Stanford University Press. ISBN 0-8047-4774-1.
- O'Neill, Robert (1985). Australia in the Korean War 1950–53: Combat Operations. Vol. II. Canberra, Australian Capital Territory: Australian War Memorial. ISBN 978-0-642-04330-6.
- Millett, Allan R. (2010). The War for Korea, 1950–1951: They Came From the North. Lawrence, KS: University Press of Kansas. ISBN 978-0-7006-1709-8.
- Johnston, William (2003). A War of Patrols: Canadian Army Operations in Korea. Vancouver, British Columbia: UBC Press. ISBN 978-0-7748-1008-1.
- Stokesbury, James L. (1990). A Short History of the Korean War. New York: Harper Perennial. ISBN 978-0-688-09513-0.
- Zhang, Shu Guang (1995). Mao's Military Romanticism: China and the Korean War, 1950–1953. Lawrence, Kansas: University Press of Kansas. ISBN 978-0-7006-0723-5.
- Zhang, Xiao Ming (2004). Red Wings Over the Yalu: China, the Soviet Union, and the Air War in Korea. College Station, TX: Texas A&M University Press. ISBN 1-58544-201-1.
