= 178th Division (1st Formation) (People's Republic of China) =

178th Division (1949–52)
- Active: 1949.2 - 1952.3
- Country: People's Republic of China
- Branch: People's Liberation Army
- Type: Division
- Role: Infantry
- Part of: 60th Corps
- Garrison/HQ: Mianyang, Sichuan
- Engagements: Chinese Civil War

The 178th Division (Chinese: 第178师) was created in November 1948 under the Regulation of the Redesignations of All Organizations and Units of the Army, issued by Central Military Commission on November 1, 1948, basing on the 22nd Brigade, 8th Column of Huabei Military District. Its history could be traced to 2nd Independent Brigade of Jiluyu Military District formed in August 1947.

The division was a part of 60th Corps. Under the flag of 178th it took part in the Chinese Civil War, including the Chengdu Campaign.

The division was composed of 532nd, 533rd and 534th Infantry Regiments.

In February 1950, the division was combined with Mianyang Military Sub-district. Its 532nd and 533rd Infantry Regiments moved to Chengdu as local garrison force.

In March 1952 the division was disbanded:

- 532nd Infantry Regiment was converted to 19th Public Security Regiment of Chuanxi Military District;
- 534th Infantry Regiment was converted to 20th Public Security Regiment of Chuanxi Military District;
- 533rd Infantry Regiment was utilized to activate the 28th Aviation Division.
