= 2nd Independent Division of Jiangsu Provincial Military District =

2nd Independent Division of Jiangsu Provincial Military District (1966–76)
- Active: 1966.9 - 1976.5
- Country: People's Republic of China
- Branch: People's Liberation Army
- Type: Division
- Role: Infantry

2nd Independent Division of Jiangsu Provincial Military District (Chinese: 江苏省军区独立第2师) was formed in September 1966 from the Public Security Contingent of Jiangsu province. The division was composed of six regiments (1st to 6th).

In May 1976, the division was disbanded.
