= 73rd Division (2nd Formation) (People's Republic of China) =

73rd Army Division (1969-78)
- Active: 1969.10 - 1978.12
- Country: People's Republic of China
- Branch: People's Liberation Army
- Type: Division
- Role: Infantry
- Part of: 60th Army Corps
- Garrison/HQ: Huoqiu, Anhui

The 73rd Army Division (Chinese: 陆军第73师)(2nd Formation) was organized in October 1969 at Chengxihu Farm in Huoqiu, Anhui province. In December 1969 the division was officially designated as 73rd Army Division.

The division was a part of 60th Army Corps. As its activation the division was composed of following regiments:

- 217th Infantry Regiment;
- 218th Infantry Regiment;
- 219th Infantry Regiment;
- Artillery Regiment.

The division conducts agricultural construction missions until December 1978, when the division was disbanded and absorbed by Chengxihu Farm.
