= 1st Independent Division of Zhejiang Provincial Military District (2nd Formation) =

Independent Division of Anhui Provincial Military District (1964–66) 1st Independent Division of Anhui Provincial Military District (1966–75) 1st Independent Division of Zhejiang Provincial Military District (1975-76) Independent Division of Zhejiang Provincial Military District (1976-80)
- Active: 1964.12 - 1980.12
- Country: People's Republic of China
- Branch: People's Liberation Army
- Type: Division
- Role: Infantry

Independent Division of Anhui Provincial Military District (Chinese: 安徽省军区独立师)(1st Formation) was formed in December 1964 from the 540th Infantry Regiment and 560th Artillery Regiment of the disbanding 180th Army Division. The division was then composed of 3 infantry regiments (1st to 3rd).

In June 1966 the division was renamed as 1st Independent Division of Anhui Provincial Military District (Chinese: 安徽省军区独立第1师) after 2nd Independent Division of Anhui Provincial Military District's formation.

From September 1967 to November 14, 1969, it was put under command of 12th Army Corps, after which the division returned to Anhui Provincial Military District's control.

On May 25, 1975, the division exchanged its designation and position with 1st Independent Division of Zhejiang Provincial Military District and became the second formation of 1st Independent Division of Zhejiang Provincial Military District (Chinese: 浙江省军区独立第1师).

The division was then stationed in Zhuji, Zhejiang.

In May 1976 the division was renamed as Independent Division of Zhejiang Provincial Military District(Chinese: 浙江省军区独立师) following 2nd Independent Division of Zhejiang Provincial Military District (People's Republic of China)'s disbandment. Artillery Regiment of the disbanding 74th Army Division was attached to the division.

In December 1980, the division's headquarters were disbanded and the three remaining regiments were merged with other local military units to form the core of the Zhejiang Provincial People's Armed Police (PAP) Corps.
