= Linfen Campaign =

Campaign during the Chinese Civil War

- Part of Chinese Civil War
Date	March 7, 1948 – May 18, 1948
Location	Linfen, Shanxi, China 37°42′N 112°24′E
Result	Communist victory

Belligerents
Flag of the National Revolutionary Army National Revolutionary Army	PLA Chinese Red Army

Commanders and leaders
Liang Peihuang	Xu Xiangqian

Strength
25,000	53,000

Casualties and losses
25,000	15,000

Linfen Campaign (临汾战役) was a series of battles fought between the communists and the nationalists during the Chinese Civil War to control the city of Linfen, and resulted in the communist victory.

== Prelude ==
After the Yuncheng Campaign (运城战役), Linfen was the only nationalist stronghold left in southern Shanxi. Linfen was ideal to defend: the city wall was 15 metres tall and 10 metres wide at the top, 25–30 metres wide at the bottom, and at the section of the Eastern Pass (Dong Guan, 东关), there was a second wall of the same size, providing additional protection. There were a total of 31 clusters of bunkers around the city and additional strongholds within 3–7 km range in the outskirt. There were deep ditches both outside and inside city wall, and fortifications within the city. Located on the eastern bank of Fen River, the east, north and south directions were wide open, with little cover for the attacking enemy to hide.

The nationalist strategy was to hold on until reinforcement arrived and then counterattack, while the communist strategy was to take the city primarily using tunnels since the communists lacked heavy artillery pieces.

== Order of battle ==
Defenders totaling 25,000: nationalist order of battle:

- The 66th Division deployed in positions outside the city
- The 30th Brigade
- The artillery battalion of the 27th Brigade
- Two Security Brigades
- Two Training Regiments
- Security forces of adjacent 15 counties withdrew into the city of Linfen

Attackers totaling 53,000: communist order of battle:

- The 8th Column
- The 13th Column
- Units of the Taiyue (太岳) Military District

== First stage ==
The nationalists begun to airlift the 30th Brigade to Luochuan (洛川) from Linfen on March 6, 1948, to strengthen the nationalist force in northwestern China. In order to prevent this, the communists decided to launch the campaign early and on March 7, 1948, the communist 24th Brigade of the 8th Column took the airfield south of Linfen after destroying two aircraft, thus cutoff the aerial link of the city. The nationalists were forced to give up the airlift plan and the city was attacked by the enemy from three sides: east, north and south. The nationalist strongholds in the outskirt of Linfen including Cui Family's Bump (Cui Jia Geda, 崔家疙瘩), Train Station (Huoche Zhan, 火车站), High River Hotel (Gao He Dian, 高河店) and Official Yao's Temple (Yao Guan Miao, 尧官庙) fell into the enemy hands, and the nationalist futile attempt to counterattack and retake these strongholds were beaten back for more than thirty times. Afterward, the enemy approached the outer city of Linfen, the Eastern Pass (Dong Guan, 东关), which was the barrier for Linfen, and the nationalists desperately attempted to hold on this critical defensive stronghold.

From March 23, 1948 – March 27, 1948, the nationalist defenders twice successfully beaten back the attacks on Eastern Pass (Dong Guan, 东关) by the communist 13th Column. On April 1, 1948, the enemy adjusted tactic and the communist 37th Brigade of the 13th Column attacked from southeast and the communist 23rd Brigade of the 8th Column attacked from northeast simultaneously, while the 4 tunnels were dug toward the city wall. On April 10, 1948, three of the four tunnels were filled with explosives and detonated simultaneously, succeeding in collapsing the city wall of the Eastern Pass (Dong Guan, 东关) section, and attacking communist 37th Brigade of the 13th Column and the communist 23rd Brigade of the 8th Column were able to swiftly taking the Eastern Pass (Dong Guan, 东关), the outer city of Linfen, badly mauling the local defenders, the nationalist 66th Division.

== Second stage ==
On April 16, 1948, the battle mostly had switched to underground when the communist 8th Column and Taiyue (太岳) Military District at eastern outskirt of Linfen and the 13th Column at southern outskirt of Linfen begun to dig 15 tunnels toward the city wall and an additional 40+ tunnels for cover. Taking the lesson learned from the loss of Eastern Pass (Dong Guan, 东关), the defenders also begun to dig tunnels to counter the underground threat. In addition, under the cover of shelling with incendiary rounds and gas attacks, the nationalist 30th Brigade counterattacked the enemy with air cover. Although the nationalist counterattack was beaten back the enemy, and the nationalists did succeed in destroying most of the enemy tunnels.

On May 1, 1948, the Xu Xiangqian changed their tactic by deploying the communist 13th Column to the east of the city to assist the communist 8th Column to attack the city, while the 22nd Brigade of the communist 8th Column and the 39th Brigade of the communist 13th Column were deployed to assist the communist regiment of the Taiyue (太岳) Military District on the western bank of the Fen River to blockade the escape route of the fleeing enemy. On May 16, 1948, the 23rd Brigade of the 8th Column succeeded in extending two 110-metre-long (360 ft) tunnels directly under the city wall, filling one with 6,000 kg black dynamite and the other with 3,500 kg dynamite. On May 15, 1948, at 7:50 PM, the dynamites were detonated, blowing up two 50-metre-wide (160 ft) gaps in the city wall and the assault team of the 69th Regiment of the communist 23rd Brigade was the first to ventured into the city and other communist units soon followed under the cover of heavy artillery fire. After fierce street fights, the battle ended after midnight when all of the defenders were either killed or captured, and the campaign concluded.

== Outcome ==
The entire nationalist garrison of Linfen was lost, including the Commander-in-chief, Liang Peihuang 梁培璜, who was captured alive by the enemy. The fall of Linfen meant that the last nationalist stronghold in southern Shanxi was finally eliminated. The communist victory of Linfen Campaign resulted in the linking up of the Lüliang communist base and Taiyue (太岳) communist base, and the entire southern Shanxi region falling into the communist hands. The communist 23rd Brigade of the 8th Column played a significant role in the taking of Linfen and was honored as Linfen Brigade after the campaign.

== See also ==
- Outline of the Chinese Civil War
- National Revolutionary Army
- History of the People's Liberation Army
