= 60th Corps (China) =

The 60th Corps was a military formation of the People's Liberation Army. During the Korean War it formed part of the CPV/PLA III Army Group.

When initially formed in February 1949, it likely consisted of the 178th Division (1st Formation) (People's Republic of China), 179th Division, and 180th Division.

In Korea the 60th Corps comprised the 179th Division, 180th, and 181st Divisions.

During what the Chinese call the 5th campaign (May, 1950), the CPV suffered its largest loss: the 180th Division was totally destroyed. Roughly 3,000 men escaped earlier (including the division commander and other high-ranking officers), but the majority of the division were killed or captured. During the final days of the 5th campaign, the main body of the 180th Division was encircled during a United States Army counterattack, and after days of hard fighting, the division fragmented, and regiments fled in all directions. Soldiers either desert or are abandoned by their officers during failed attempts to wage guerilla warfare without support from locals. Finally, out of ammunition and food, some five thousand soldiers are captured, including the Division Commissar Pei Shan. The division commander and other officers who escaped were subsequently investigated and demoted back in China.

During its deployment in Korea from 1952 the 33rd Division was attached to 12th Corps, then the 60th Corps, taking part in the 1953 Summer Offensive.

The army left Korea in October 1953.

The army was active in the Nanjing Military Region until disbanded in late 1985.

From 1954 to 1960, the corps was composed of:

- 179th Division
- 180th Division
- 181st Division
- 167th Artillery Regiment
- 85th Anti-Aircraft Artillery Regiment

In April 1960, the corps was renamed as 60th Army Corps(Chinese: 陆军第60军).

In 1961, the 180th Army Division detached from the army to the 5th Institution, Ministry of Defense's control. In 1962 the division returned to the army corps' control and was disbanded in late 1964.

From then the division was composed of:

- 179th Army Division
- 181st Army Division
- 167th Artillery Regiment
- 85th Anti-Aircraft Artillery Regiment

In July 1967, the 178th Army Division was activated and attached to the corps.

In 1969, designation numbers were dropped from artillery units, and the 181st Army Division was redesignated as the 180th Army Division. By then the corps was composed of:

- 178th Army Division
- 179th Army Division
- 180th Army Division
- Artillery Regiment
- Anti-Aircraft Artillery Regiment

In 1970, 73rd Army Division was attached to the corps.

In May 1976, 38th Tank Regiment, 10th Tank Division attached to the army corps and reconstituted as Tank Regiment, 60th Army Corps.

In December 1978, the 73rd Army Division was disbanded.

In 1983, the 10th Tank Division and the 66th Anti-Aircraft Artillery Division were attached to the army corps.

In September 1985, the army corps was disbanded:

- 178th Army Division was disbanded; Headquarters, 178th Army Division was converted to Headquarters, Artillery Brigade of 1st Army.
- 179th Army Division was transferred to 12th Army's control.
- 180th Army Division was transferred to 1st Army's control and redesignated as the 181st Infantry Division.
- 10th Tank Division was transferred to 1st Army's control.
- 66th Anti-Aircraft Artillery Division was transferred to 1st Army's control and reconstituted as the Anti-Aircraft Artillery Brigade, 1st Army.
- Tank Regiment, 60th Army Corps was transferred to the 10th Tank Division as the 38th Tank Regiment again.
- Artillery Regiment and Anti-Aircraft Regiment, 60th Army Corps were disbanded.
