= 180th Division (People's Republic of China) =

180th Division (1949–53) 180th Infantry Division (1953–60) 180th Army Division (1960–64)
- Active: 1949.2 - 1964.12
- Country: People's Republic of China
- Branch: People's Liberation Army, People's Volunteer Army
- Type: Division
- Role: Infantry
- Part of: 60th Corps
- Engagements: Chinese Civil War

The 180th Division was created in February 1949 under the Regulation of the Redesignations of All Organizations and Units of the Army, issued by Central Military Commission on November 1, 1948, basing on the 24th Brigade, 8th Column of Huabei Military Region. Its history could be traced to 24th Brigade, 8th Column of Jinjiluyu Field Army formed in July 1947.

The division was part of 60th Corps. Under the flag of 180th division it took part in the Chinese Civil War. Before the Korean War it was stationed in Chengdu, Sichuan.

From March 1951 the division entered Korea as a part of the People's Volunteer Army during the Korean War with a standard strength of approximately 10,000 men.

During what the Chinese call the 5th campaign (22 April 1951 – 10 June 1951), the PVA/CPV suffered its largest loss during the war: the 180th Division of the 60th Army was destroyed. Roughly 3,000 men escaped earlier (including the division commander and other high-ranking officers), but the majority of the division were killed or captured. During the final days of the 5th campaign, the main body of the 180th Division was encircled during a UN counterattack, and after a few days of hard fighting, the division was fragmented, and regiments fled in all directions. Soldiers either deserted or were abandoned by their officers during failed attempts to wage guerilla warfare without support from locals. Finally, out of ammunition and food, some 5,000 soldiers were captured. The division commander and other officers who escaped were subsequently investigated and demoted back in China.

Most of those captured from the 180th Division were sent to Koje Island, 25 miles southwest of Pusan, including the Division Commissar Pei Shan. Since many of the officers were former Nationalist Chinese Army Military cadets many chose to join their former units and complete their training in Taiwan. A large portion remained in Taiwan after the Korean War.

The remaining part of the division absorbed 3 replacement regiments and took part in the Battle of Kumsong. In September 1953 it pulled out from Korea. In 1953 it renamed as 180th Infantry Division.

In April 1960 the division was renamed as 180th Army Division. By then the division was composed of:

- 538th Infantry Regiment;
- 539th Infantry Regiment;
- 540th Infantry Regiment;
- 560th Artillery Regiment.

On December 20, 1964, the division was disbanded in Anhui Province. The 540th Infantry and 560th Artillery Regiments formed the basis for the Independent Division of Anhui Provincial Military District.
