= 178th Division (2nd Formation) (People's Republic of China) =

178th Army Division (1967-85)
- Active: 1967.7 - 1985.9
- Country: People's Republic of China
- Branch: People's Liberation Army
- Type: Division
- Role: Infantry
- Part of: 60th Army Corps
- Garrison/HQ: Suzhou, Jiangsu

The 178th Army Division (Chinese: 陆军第178师)(2nd Formation) was activated on July 1, 1967 at Chengxihu Farm in Huoqiu, Anhui province.

The division was a part of 60th Army Corps. As its activation the division was a behind-the-enemy-line formation, composing of 4 infantry regiments:

- 532nd Infantry Regiment (former 543rd);
- 533rd Infantry Regiment;
- 534th Infantry Regiment;
- 538th Infantry Regiment.

The division conducts agricultural construction missions until October 1969, when it was replaced by the activating 73rd Army Division and moved to Suzhou, Jiangsu as a combat alert unit. By that time the division was converted to a field-army formation, and its 538th Infantry Regiment was reorganized as Artillery Regiment, 178th Army Division. Since then the division was composed of:

- 532nd Infantry Regiment;
- 533rd Infantry Regiment;
- 534th Infantry Regiment;
- Artillery Regiment.

In September 1985 the division was disbanded. Headquarters, 178th Army Division was converted to Headquarters, Artillery Brigade of 1st Army.
