= Battle of Paro Lake =

1951 battle in the Korean War

- Part of the Korean War
Date	May 26–30, 1951
Location	Hwacheon, Paro Lake, South Korea.
Result	United Nations victory

Belligerents
United Nations: South Korea	China

Commanders and leaders
(First Republic of Korea) Chang Do-yong	(China) Fu Chongbi

Units involved
(First Republic of Korea) 6th Infantry Division: 2nd Regiment; 7th Regiment; 19th Regiment	(China) 63rd Corps: 187 Division; 188 Division; 189 Division

Casualties and losses
107 killed 494 wounded 33 missing	According to the War Memorial of Korea or Committee of Warfare in History (1983): ~5,000 killed; According to some Korean records: 3,000~21,550 killed, more from the POWs

The Battle of Paro Lake (Korean: 파로호 전투, Chinese: 破虏湖战役) took place during the Korean War. It was fought between elements of the Republic of Korea Army 6th Infantry Division and elements of the People's Volunteer Army (PVA) 63rd Corps between May 26 and 30, 1951. The claims of the Korean and U.S. military are different from those of the Chinese military. Paro Lake is a name that arose after this battle. It is said that after the battle, the South Korean army threw numerous corpses of PVA soldiers into the river.

== Background ==
During the UN May–June 1951 counteroffensive the 6th Division was part of IX Corps operating on the central sector of the United Nations Command (UN) front above the Bukhan River and along the upper bank of the Hongch'on River.

On 26 May, X Corps' commander Lieutenant general William M. Hoge ordered the bulk of the 6th Division, which was being pinched out of its central zone by the converging attacks of other UN units, to move to the Corps' east flank and advance with the 7th Division to seize the Hwacheon town-Hwacheon Reservoir road center and block the escape of PVA forces. Leaving the 19th Regiment in the central zone to attack directly toward Chiam-ni (37.98°N 127.606°E) until pinched out, General Chang Do-yong assembled the remainder of his division in the Chuncheon area in preparation for a move up on the side of the 7th Division on 27 May.
