= UN May–June 1951 counteroffensive =

Military operation during the Korean War

- Part of the Korean War
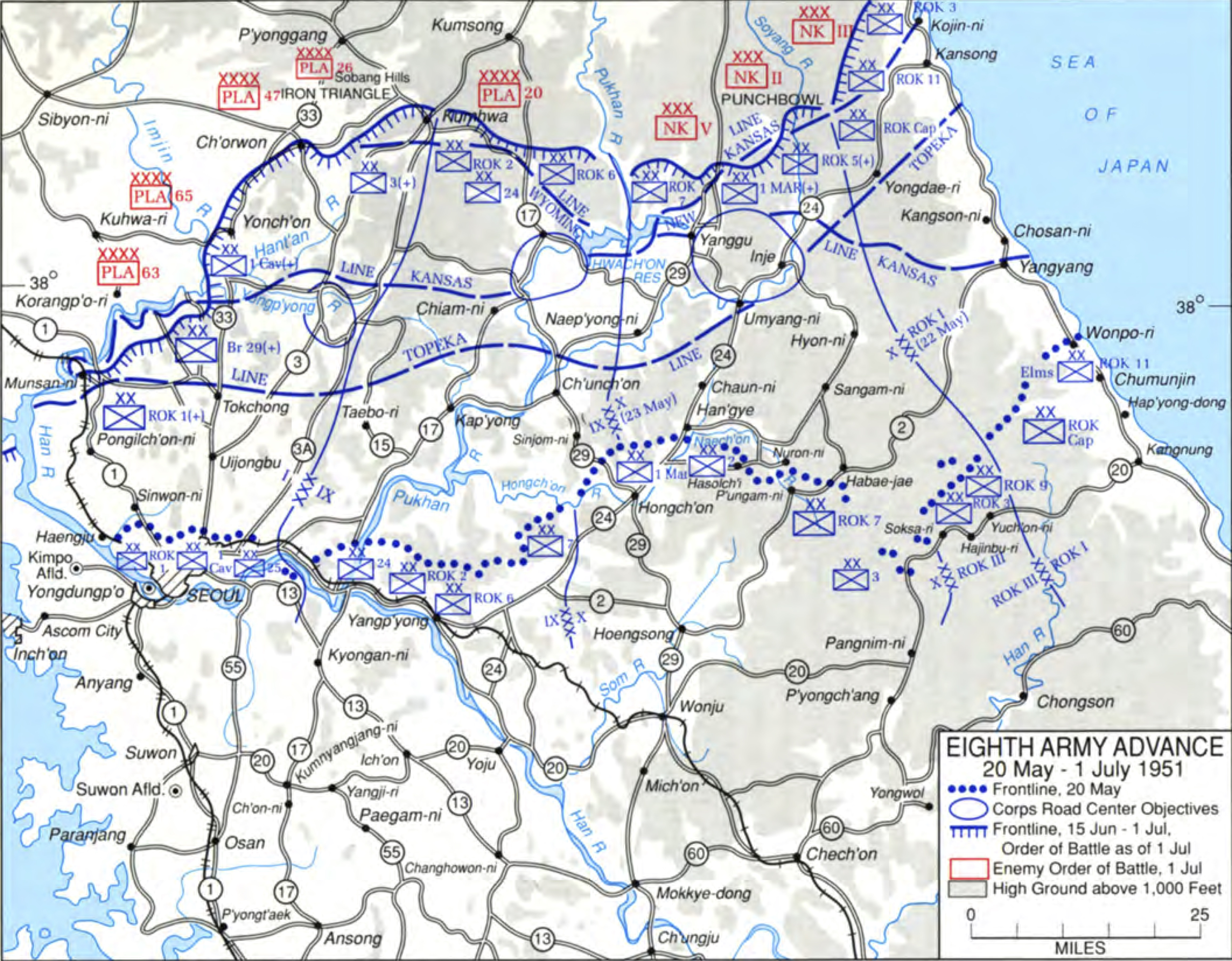
- UN May-June 1951 counteroffensive map
Date	20 May – 1 July 1951
Location	Imjin River and Hwach'on Reservoir
Result	UN partial victory: UN forces retake most territory lost in the Chinese spring offensive; Military stalemate following offensive

Belligerents
United Nations: United States; South Korea	China; North Korea

Commanders and leaders
(United Nations) Matthew Ridgway (United States) James Van Fleet	(China) Peng Dehuai

Strength
(United States) I Corps; IX Corps; X Corps (First Republic of Korea) I Corps; II Corps	(China) 12th Army; 15th Army; 27th Army; 63rd Army; 64th Army (North Korea) I Corps; II Corps; V Corps

The UN May–June 1951 counteroffensive was a military operation performed by the United Nations Command (UN) during the Korean War launched in response to the Chinese spring offensive of April-May 1951. It was the final large-scale offensive of the war that saw significant territorial changes.

By 19 May the second phase of the spring offensive, the Battle of the Soyang River, on the eastern section of the front, was losing momentum due to reinforcement of the UN forces, supply difficulties and mounting losses from UN air and artillery strikes. On 20 May the Chinese People's Volunteer Army (PVA) and Korean People's Army (KPA) began to withdraw after suffering heavy losses, simultaneously the UN launched their counteroffensive in the west and central portions of the front. On 24 May, once the PVA/KPA advance had been halted, the UN began a counteroffensive there also. In the west UN forces were unable to maintain contact with the PVA/KPA as they withdrew faster than the UN advance. In the central area the UN forces made contact with the PVA/KPA at chokepoints north of Chuncheon inflicting heavy losses. In the east UN forces had remained in contact with the PVA/KPA and progressively pushed them back north of the Soyang River.

By mid-June UN forces had reached Line Kansas approximately 2–6 miles (3.2–9.7 km) north of the 38th Parallel from which they had withdrawn at the start of the spring offensive and in some areas advanced to Line Wyoming further north. With the discussions for the start of ceasefire negotiations underway, the UN advance stopped on the Kansas-Wyoming Line which was fortified as the Main line of resistance and despite some limited attacks this would essentially remain the frontline throughout the next two years of stalemate.

== Background ==
On 18 May, in response to Chinese People's Volunteer Army (PVA) and Korean People's Army (KPA) attacks on the east of the front in the Battle of the Soyang River, UN commander General Matthew Ridgway suggested to US Eighth Army commander General James Van Fleet that he should attempt to relieve the pressure on his forces in the east by attacking in the west to threaten PVA/KPA lines of communication in the Iron Triangle. Ridgway recommended a two-division attack moving on the Route 33 axis towards Ch'orwon. He thought such an attack would have a good chance of succeeding since intelligence indicated that only four PVA armies occupied the 40 miles (64 km) sector of the front west of Chuncheon and since PVA commander Peng Dehuai would need at least a week or ten days to shift any material part of his mass from the east to oppose the advance. Nor had PVA/KPA forces on the western front shown much aggressiveness. PVA attacks had forced back some patrol base and outpost units and had tested the main line in both the US I Corps and US IX Corps sectors, but these attacks had been isolated affairs, not coordinated actions in a concerted holding operation.

Judging PVA/KPA forces in the east-central area to be clearly overextended after he reconnoitered the front on 19 May, Ridgway enlarged his concept to take advantage of their vulnerability and ordered Van Fleet to attack across the entire front. Agreeing that the PVA/KPA forces could be trapped, Van Fleet laid out an operation that he believed could produce decisive results if the attack moved fast enough. Though stabilizing the line in the east remained a problem, he now viewed that task with no great alarm even though PVA/KPA forces were deepening and strengthening their penetration. If for no other reason, he expected their logistical difficulties in the mountains to slow if not stop their advance within a matter of days; they would have created only a "long bag" that could closed behind them by rapid drives to block their main routes of resupply and withdrawal. Van Fleet's plan called for I Corps, IX Corps and part of the US 1st Marine Division at the left of US X Corps to advance on 20 May toward the Munsan-Chuncheon segment of Line Topeka. Once the Topeka segment was occupied, strikes to start closing the bag were to be made toward the Iron Triangle, one up Route 3 to secure a road center in the Yongp'yong River valley some 20 miles (32 km) above Uijongbu, another up Route 17 beyond Chuncheon to seize the complex of road junctions at the west end of the Hwacheon Reservoir.

== Attack ==
=== West-Central sector ===
On 20 May, with the objective of reaching the main bodies of PVA/KPA forces, including reserves, before they could organize for defensive action, I Corps' commander Lieutenant general Frank W. Milburn set his three divisions on courses for Line Topeka some 15 miles (24 km) above his Seoul defenses, aiming the Republic of Korea Army (ROKA) 1st Division toward Munsan, the US 1st Cavalry Division north through Uijongbu and up Route 33, and the US 25th Infantry Division north along Route 3 toward the road hub in the Yongp'yong River valley. To the east IX Corps commander Lieutenant general William M. Hoge had established an intermediate line, Georgia, whose central trace lay just above the lateral stretch of the Bukhan River dammed on the west to form the Chongpyong Reservoir and along the upper bank of the Hongch'on River emptying into the reservoir from the east. A rapid advance to Line Georgia, Hoge had believed, would allow his four divisions (the US 24th Infantry Division and the ROKA 2nd and 6th Divisions and the US 7th Infantry Division, arrayed west to east) to reach the PVA/KPA reserves.

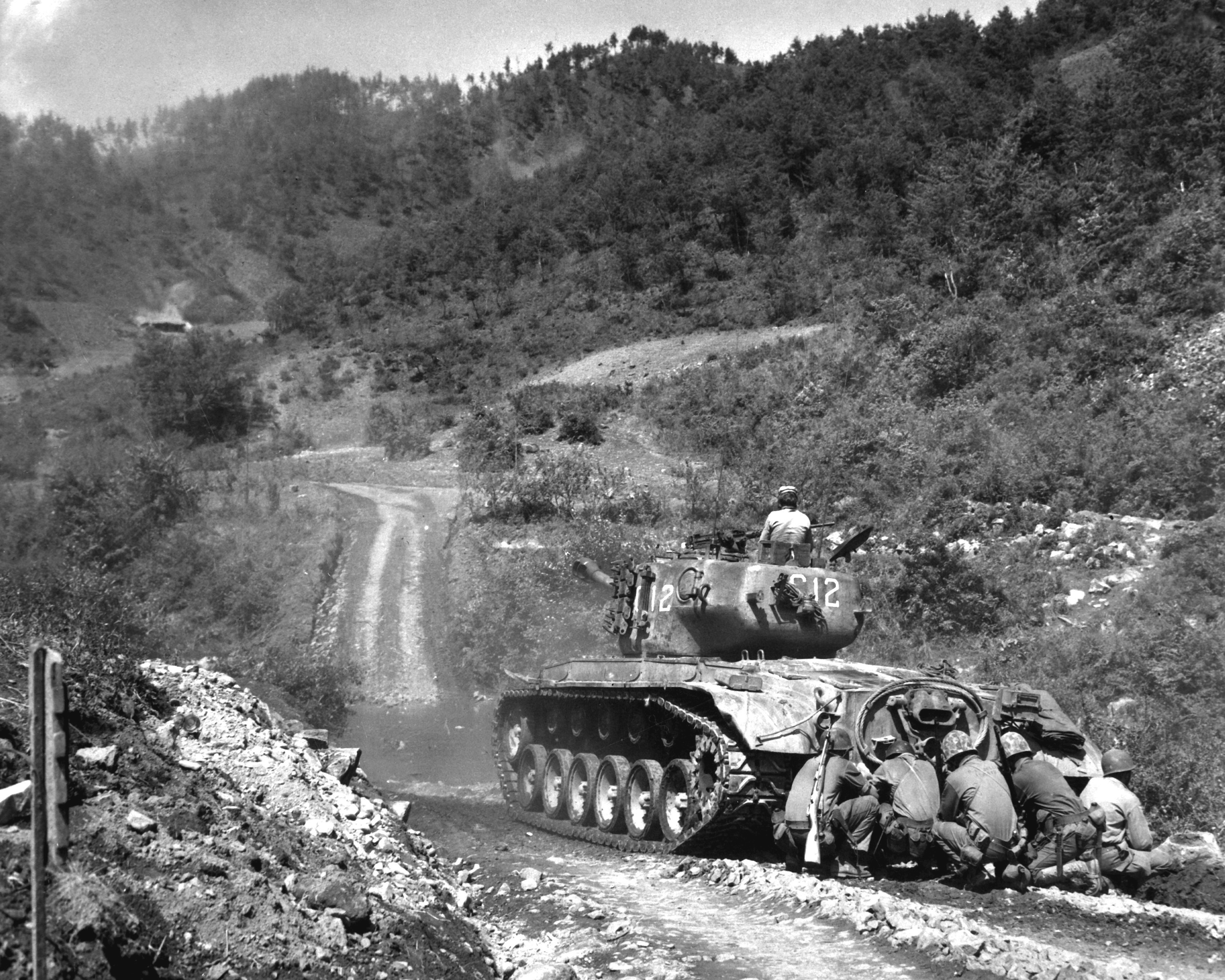
Marine infantrymen take cover behind a tank while it fires on Communist troops near Hongch'on

I Corps' forces had gained ground rapidly, especially the ROKA 1st Division, which entered Munsan-ni at midmorning on 21 May, and all three divisions were on or near Line Topeka by evening of 23 May. But the attack had amounted to a futile chase as the KPA I Corps and PVA 63rd Army retreated faster than the I Corps advanced. Tank and tank-infantry forces probing well to the front of the main body of the 25th Infantry Division consistently failed to make solid contact and raised doubt that the Yongp'yong River valley road hub more than 10 miles (16 km) ahead of the division could be taken in time to block PVA/KPA movement through it.

Despite light resistance, the IX Corps' attack from the outset had been more cautious than aggressive. After a short advance on 20 May, Hoge sharply reprimanded his division commanders for failing to push their attacks, but gains on 21 May were even shorter. Attempting again to accelerate the advance, Hoge directed his forces to employ pursuit tactics and move no less than 6 miles (9.7 km) on 22 May, a distance that would carry them 2 miles (3.2 km) to 3 miles (4.8 km) beyond Line Georgia, far enough, if done speedily enough, Hoge believed, to break through covering forces and make contact with the main bodies of withdrawing PVA. The attack on the 22nd, however, took his four divisions no farther than Line Georgia.

In new attack orders for 23 May, Hoge made zone adjustments, obliged to do so on his right by Van Fleet's orders moving the corps boundary east as X Corps joined the counterattack. The ROKA 7th Division, after advancing in its present zone for most of the day, was to relieve 1st Marine Division forces straddling Route 29 and prepare to attack on the Chuncheon-Hwacheon axis toward the road complex at the west end of the Hwacheon Reservoir. On his left, Hoge switched the zones of the 24th Infantry Division and ROKA 2nd Division and ordered 24th Division commander General Blackshear M. Bryan to send a task force northeast up Route 17 to seize Kap'yong while the remainder of his division followed astride the road. The ROKA 2nd Division, shifting to the Corps' left flank after Bryan's forces passed through it en route to Kap'yong, was to attack northwest along secondary Route 15 toward Taebo-ri.

Still trying to animate his forces, Hoge again directed pursuit tactics and authorized them to bypass enemy groups up to company in size. His divisions advanced easily on 23 May against an accelerating withdrawal by the PVA 63rd and 64th Armies, but few units gained more than 5 miles (8.0 km). In the deepest move, Bryan's task force of tanks and the 1st Battalion, 21st Infantry Regiment captured Kap'yong after meeting only a smattering of opposition along Route 17. Hoge nevertheless now had two American divisions positioned for advances over roads converging near the lower edge of his road center objective, the 7th Infantry Division below Chuncheon and the 24th at Kap'yong, whence a secondary valley road left Route 17 and ran northeast to rejoin it near the village of Chiam-ni (37.98°N 127.606°E).

=== Eastern sector ===
General Edward Almond's plan for the X Corps' counterattack commencing on 23 May amounted to an enlargement of limited attacks launched the day before. In the Soksa-ri (37.638°N 128.495°E) area, the 1st Battalion, 7th Infantry Regiment, had driven cross-country against hard resistance to a position commanding the lower end of a pass on the Soksa-ri-Habaejae (37.749°N 128.307°E) road about midway between the towns. Almond ordered the 3rd Infantry Division to point its general attack at the remainder of the 2 miles (3.2 km) pass and, farther north, at a road junction some 2 miles (3.2 km) due east of Habaejae where the Soksa-ri-Habaejae road connected with another road winding northeast through the higher Taebaek Mountains to Yangyang on the coast. The seizure of these objectives, ordered before the withdrawal of PVA/KPA forces from the Soksa-ri-Hajinbu-ri area became apparent, was aimed at blocking the two best roads behind the PVA. Almond reinforced the 3rd Division by attaching the ROKA 8th Division, now fully assembled in Chech'on, and also gave the ROKA 9th Division (received as a result of ROKA III Corps' inactivation on 22 May) to General Robert H. Soule along with the responsibility for the additional ground assigned to X Corps in the Hajinbu-ri area. About to attack with the approximation of a corps, Soule planned to send his 7th and 65th Regiments toward the pass and road junction, bring the damaged ROK 9th Division back into action in the Hajinbu-ri area, and keep the untried ROKA 8th Division in reserve.

Task Force Yoke, the mix of: the 2nd Battalion, 38th Infantry Regiment; the bulk of the ROKA 3rd Regiment; all but two companies of the 72nd Tank Battalion; a platoon of the 15th Infantry Regiment's tank company; a battery of the 300th Field Artillery Battalion; and a tactical air control party organized by Almond under the deputy corps commander, Colonel Ladue, had attacked through the lines of the ROKA 7th Division in the P'ungam-ni (37.714°N 128.184°E) area to seize the Habaejae road junction. A combination of difficult terrain, heavy, if spotty, resistance, and a foot-dragging performance by the South Korean troops had stopped Ladue 3 miles (4.8 km) short of his objective. For the general attack, Almond elected to replace the Yoke forces with Task Force Able, built around the 15th Regimental Combat Team (15th RCT), which was to be detached from the 3rd Division and operate under Corps' control. Once the Able force had taken Habaejae and the 3rd Division coming up from the south had captured the road junction 4 miles (6.4 km) to the east, the task force was to be dissolved and the 15th Infantry was to join the operations of its own division.

In what amounted to the beginning of one of two major spearheads of the corps counterattack, Almond on the afternoon of 22 May had sent the 187th Airborne Regimental Combat Team (187th RCT) up Route 24 to take the high ground around Han'gye (37.806°N 127.991°E). Passing through the 23rd Infantry, General Frank S. Bowen's forces, with a battalion of the 5th Marine Regiment and two battalions of the 9th Infantry Regiment moving forward on their flanks, had driven to their objective easily against light opposition. In the counterattack, the main effort was to be made on the Route 24 axis. The 2nd Infantry Division, with the 187th RCT attached, was to drive on Inje, the 1st Marine Division to advance on Yanggu. Almond's concept was that the two spearheads would trap the enemy forces east of Route 24 and lay them open to destruction by Corps forces advancing on the right.

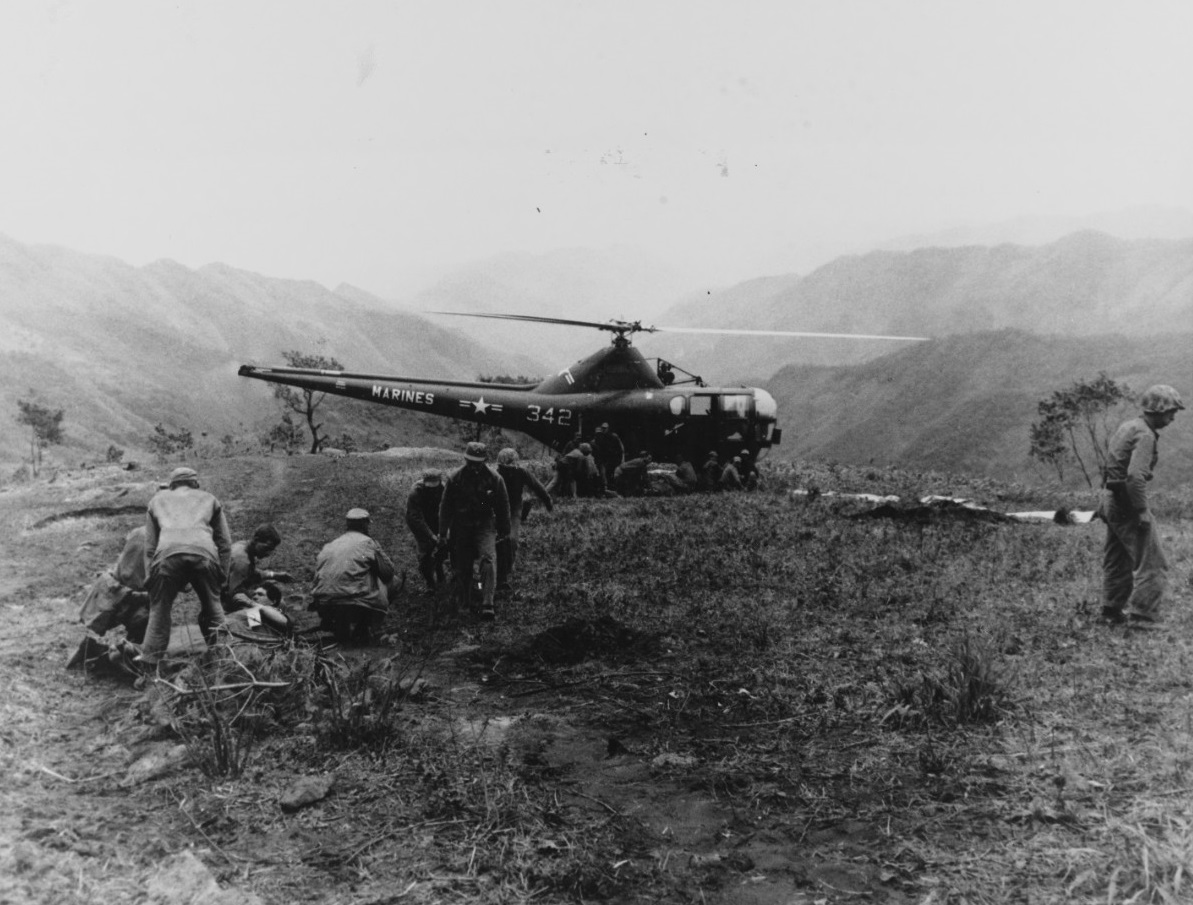
Marine helicopter evacuates wounded from Kari-san (Hill 1051)

In the drive on Yanggu, the opening attack of the 1st Marine Division along the west side of Route 24 carried the 1st and 5th Marine Regiments into the extremely rough ground rising toward Hill 1051 (37.871°N 127.956°E) (Kari-san). In a gain of about 4 miles (6.4 km), exhausting climbs and descents felled more Marines than did encounters with rearguard forces of the retreating PVA 15th Army. A highlight of the attack was the recovery of eleven wounded men of the 2nd Infantry Division by 5th Marine forces advancing within 1 mile (1.6 km) of Hill 1051.

For the 2nd Infantry Division's move on Inje, General Clark L. Ruffner assigned the main effort to the 187th RCT. With Company B of the 72nd Tank Battalion attached, Bowen's combat team was to take over the zone of the 23rd Infantry Regiment, which Almond had ordered into corps reserve, and attack up Route 24, initially (as Almond also had directed) to seize a bridge site on the Soyang River at Umyang-ni (37.966°N 128.076°E), 6 miles (9.7 km) southwest of the Inje road center. On a parallel course at the division's right, the 38th Infantry was to advance along the mountain road running northeast from P'ungam-ni to Hyon-ni (37.943°N 128.316°E) and then turning northwest to Inje. The 9th Infantry was to sweep the division's central area.

With the entire PVA 12th Army attempting to withdraw north between Route 24 and the P'ungam-ni-Hyon-ni road, 2nd Division forces advancing in that area on 23 May encountered only feeble delaying actions. Somewhat stouter, but not immovable blocking positions confronted the 38th Infantry on the right, where the PVA 80th Division of the 27th Army apparently was trying to hold open the Habaejae-Sangam-ni (37.875°N 128.257°E) segment of the road coming up from Soksa-ri. Yet Ruffner's opening attack was no great surge forward. Average gains of 4 miles (6.4 km) matched those of the 1st Marine Division and took the 2nd Division only as far as its nearest intermediate terrain objectives in the high ground confining the Naech'on River on the north and northeast.

As originally constituted for the attack to seize the Habaejae road junction, Task Force Able included the 15th RCT, the bulk of the ROKA 3rd Regiment, and a battery of the 300th Field Artillery Battalion, the last two units coming from the disbanded Task Force Yoke. With characteristic attention to custom-making assault forces, Almond reshaped the force late on 22 May, passing the South Koreans back to the ROKA 7th Division, which was to go into Corps' reserve, pulling the 3rd Battalion, 15th Infantry Regiment and returning it to 3rd Division control, and adding the headquarters and a company of the 2nd Division's 72nd Heavy Tank Battalion. It was mid-afternoon before Lieutenant colonel Thomas R. Yancey, the 15th RCT and task force commander, could organize the Able force and open the attack. The late start and rugged terrain, more than enemy opposition, held Yancey's gains on 23 May to little more than 1 mile (1.6 km), well short of Habaejae.

In the 3rd Division zone, the 1st Battalion, 7th Infantry, occupied the remainder of the pass north of Soksa-ri on 23 May while Soule maneuvered other units of his "corps" forward for the advance toward the road junction east of Habaejae. The 65th Infantry Regiment took position west of the 7th Infantry while the ROKA 9th Division brought up the rear in reserve. All contacts during the day were with KPA rearguards covering the PVA 81st Division and 93rd Regiment, 31st Division, as they withdrew to Habaejae.

It was obvious, especially in the I and IX Corps' zones, that a head start and fast marches so far had allowed the main enemy bodies to withdraw well out of the reach of the counterattack. Van Fleet was nevertheless confident that his forces, because of the light opposition to their advance, still had a better than even chance of blocking the enemy's main withdrawal routes and on 24 May pressed Milburn, Hoge and Almond to quicken the pace of their attacks to seize their road center objectives. Van Fleet saw a particularly good opportunity to trap and destroy forces of the KPA II, III and V Corps and PVA 12th, 20th and 27th Armies in the area east of Route 24 with a squeeze by X Corps and ROKA I Corps. Once Almond had captured the Yanggu-Inje area, he was to mount an attack northeast along Route 24 to the coast in concert with a northwestward drive by General Paik Sun-yup's ROKA I Corps forces. Success would depend on the speed of the two-pronged advance, especially on a rapid attack by X Corps to block enemy avenues of escape.

Milburn attempted to hurry I Corps with orders for a top-speed move to Line Kansas. Driving up Route 3 ahead of the general advance, the 89th Heavy Tank Battalion and a battalion of the 27th Infantry Regiment blocked the road hub on 25 May, and all three of Milburn's divisions reached Line Kansas on 27 May. But the attack, as from the outset, was a fruitless pursuit. Easily outstripping Milburn's forces, all major enemy formations on the I Corps front had withdrawn above the 38th Parallel in the east and across the Imjin River in the west.

=== Chuncheon ===
The IX Corps' objective on 24 May was Line Topeka, which in the 7th Division's new zone on the east wing lay just above Chuncheon. Aiming to ease the division's attack and thus accelerate its coming move on the Hwacheon road center, Hoge ordered General Claude Ferenbaugh to lead with a 15 miles (24 km) armored drive up Route 29 into Chuncheon. Following Ferenbaugh's instructions that the 32nd Infantry Regiment operating in the area straddling the road send a strong tank-infantry patrol to develop enemy defenses in Chuncheon and check the Soyang River above town for crossing sites, the commander of the 32nd shaped a small task force from the attached 7th Reconnaissance Company, a platoon of the regimental tank company, and a squad of engineers to be led by the reconnaissance company commander, Captain Charles E. Hazel. Task Force Hazel set out under orders simply to reconnoiter the Chuncheon area and return to regimental lines.

8 miles (13 km) below Chuncheon Task Force Hazel came under heavy small arms and machine gun fire from hills around the village of Sinjom-ni (37.757°N 127.78°E), where Route 29 began climbing to Wonch'ang pass cutting through the southern rim of the Chuncheon basin. The PVA 60th Army had set a regiment in blocking positions along with winding stretch of road from Sinjom-ni through the pass, but had not employed antitank weapons. His battalion not yet displaced far enough forward to be within range, the artillery observer with Hazel was unable to adjust fire onto the hills. After return fire on the hillsides by Hazel's gunners found few marks, Hazel ordered back the members of his force riding in thin-skinned jeeps and halftracks and continued up the road with eleven tanks. Once through the twisting pass under a hard but harmless pelting by rifle and machine gun fire, the armored column barreled into the Chuncheon basin and drove into the center of town late in the afternoon. Fanning out in twos and threes, Hazel's tankers searched the city and both sides of the Soyang, killing, capturing, or routing about 100 PVA and punishing a large force discovered running off the back side of Hill 302 hugging Chuncheon on the northeast. In a scramble to get away from the probing tanks, the PVA made no attempt to return fire.

As his tank crews cleared Chuncheon, Hazel received orders from his regimental commander to remain in town for the night. Two platoons of the regimental tank company were to reinforce him and bring along a resupply of rations, gasoline, and ammunition. Hazel took his force to the airstrip at the western edge of town where the flat ground allowed good fields of fire. While circling his tanks into a tight perimeter, he was asked by regiment if Ferenbaugh was with him. The division commander, his aide, and escorts had started up Route 29 in two jeeps some time earlier to contact Hazel's force, but there had been no word from the general since late afternoon. Hazel knew nothing of Ferenbaugh's whereabouts but could have correctly guessed that he had run into trouble at Sinjom-ni.

Ferenbaugh and his group had come under the guns of the PVA blocking force about 16:30. PVA fire swept the jeep carrying the escorts, leaving two dead and a third wounded sprawled in the road, and chased the general, his aide, and driver to cover and concealment among rocks and foliage on a hillside to the east. A division psychological warfare team en route to Chuncheon to broadcast a surrender appeal came on the scene three hours later and turned back to the lines of the 32nd Infantry, where they reported the ambush to 1st Lt. Ivan G. Stanaway, a platoon leader of the regimental tank company then lining up his platoon on the road to join Task Force Hazel. Taking his tanks forward immediately, Stanaway picked up the wounded escort and determined where the general was. Stanaway's crews found space to turn around and parked as close to the hillside as possible. There, under a peppering of small arms and machine gun fire, they buttoned up and waited until full dark, when Ferenbaugh and the men with him worked their way one at a time to Stanaway's tank and got in through the escape hatch. The three reached safety behind the 32nd Infantry's lines around 21:00.

Amid, and perhaps because of, the anxiety caused by the disappearance of Ferenbaugh, Task Force Hazel shortly before dark received withdrawal orders relayed from division headquarters. With the Sinjom-ni-Wonch'ang pass stretch of the road bordered by PVA, the prudent move was to pull the force below the PVA blocking position for resupply. Hazel again worked his column through PVA fire in the pass without harm except to prisoners riding atop the tanks, all but one of whom were hit. Hazel lost two tanks farther down the road, one that its crew put out of commission when it ran out of fuel, another that tumbled off the road into a deep gully in the darkness. At 32nd Infantry headquarters Hazel learned that his force, enlarged as arranged earlier, was to return to Chuncheon the next morning with a battalion of the 17th Infantry Regiment, coming out of division reserve, following to clear the PVA out of the pass and join the task force in town.

Though not the operation Hoge had in mind, Hazel's foray on 24 May had accomplished more than simply run some PVA out of town. Hazel's reinforced column returned to Chuncheon early on 25 May without encountering PVA along the road or in town. Air observers scanning the ground above Chuncheon after daylight found over 10,000 PVA jamming Route 17 and the secondary roads and trails leading to it. To the west and northwest of town they sighted another large mass of PVA, which they estimated in the thousands, moving through the ground between Route 17 and the Kap'yong-Chiam-ni road. Assuming that the tanks of Task Force Hazel entering Chuncheon on the 24th were the point of a large attack force following, the main PVA bodies had begun to swarm north during the night, to escape through Hwacheon town.

=== Chiam-ni and Hwacheon ===
Artillery fire and air strikes hit the retreating PVA from midmorning on added to the disorder of their withdrawal. By 09:30 Ferenbaugh had the full 17th Infantry motorized and en route to Chuncheon, whence about midday the regiment attacked north as the pursuit force following the PVA cramming Route 17 and as the right arm of an encircling move to bottle the PVA sighted to the west and northwest of town. Reaching around these forces on the west was the 21st Infantry Regiment moving up the Kap'yong-Chiam-ni road in the 24th Division zone. The juncture of the two regiments in the Chiam-ni area would block the PVA retreat, and by dark the two forces were within 6 miles (9.7 km) of doing so. Earlier, at midday, air observers located forces of the 12th and 15th Armies coming out of the X Corps' zone. The observers reported some 10–12,000 troops and numerous vehicles and artillery pieces moving in long columns through the ground below the Hwacheon Reservoir and heading northwest toward Hwacheon town. Artillery and an entire fighter group attacked these columns while Hoge moved to strengthen his attack to seize the Hwacheon town-Hwacheon Reservoir road center and block their escape. Hoge's orders, issued early on 26 May, called for the bulk of the ROKA 6th Division, which was being pinched out of its central zone by the converging attacks of the 17th and 21st Regiments, to move to the Corps' east flank and advance with the 7th Division to seize the road center. Leaving the 19th Regiment in the central zone to attack directly toward Chiam-ni until pinched out, General Chang Do-yong assembled the remainder of his division in the Chuncheon area in preparation for a move up on the side of the 7th Division on 27 May.

The spearhead 17th and 21st Regiments joined forces near Chiam-ni early on 26 May while in the general IX Corps' advance the ROKA 19th Regiment, 6th Division pushed north through scattered resistance and reached positions within 3 miles (4.8 km) of Chiam-ni. Three regiments thus penned the PVA between Route 17 and the Kap'yong-Chiam-ni road in a rough triangle formed by the two roads and the South Korean line. Heavy, low-hanging clouds held aircraft on the ground all day, but artillery fire pummeled the PVA continuously. While concentrating on trapping the PVA group, the 17th Infantry sent a tank-infantry patrol up Route 17 toward Hwacheon. 4 miles (6.4 km) below the town the patrol discovered the rear of the PVA force observed passing through that area the day before. The score for the day was thus one PVA force cornered and another, somewhat larger, lost.

As the 21st Infantry completed its advance to Chiam-ni, the regimental headquarters company and the medical company set up a joint perimeter away from any of the rifle companies 3 miles (4.8 km) southwest of Chiam-ni. Some 300 PVA attacking northwest after midnight against the arc of the perimeter manned by the medical company were thrown back with heavy casualties. Survivors withdrew to nearby high ground and sprayed the perimeter with machine gun fire, lifting it from time to time through the night as more PVA moved forward to attack. Each assault was turned back in close fighting. The 5th Infantry Regiment, arriving from the south around dawn, broke up the last force of PVA to approach the perimeter. The defending forces lost two killed and 20 wounded during the repeated attacks. PVA losses were 300 killed, an estimated 250 wounded and 450 captured.

Other PVA groups in battalion strength attempted to punch their way north out of the trap during the early morning of 27 May, but were knocked back by the forces blocking the way in the Chiam-ni area. After these failures there were no more organized efforts to escape, only confused clumps of PVA moving around in search of a way out. While the 17th and 21st Regiments turned north to join the general Corps' advance, mop-up operations by the 5th Infantry and ROKA 19th Regiment, 6th Division raised the prisoner toll to around 2,000. During a final sweep of the area by the 5th Infantry on 28 May, PVA taken captive, many of whom surrendered in large groups, brought the total to nearly 38,000.

Action in the general Corps' advance was concentrated along Route 17 where PVA fought hard to hold open the Hwacheon town-Hwacheon Reservoir escape route for the columns moving northwest out of the ground below the reservoir. Rain and heavy clouds that had kept aircraft on the ground finally lightened in the afternoon of 27 May, allowing air strikes along with artillery fire to take a heavy count of the PVA scurrying to get above Hwacheon. The 17th Infantry meanwhile fought up Route 17 through stubborn resistance and entered Hwacheon at 14:00, but a division of the PVA 20th Army blocked the regiment's attempts to advance north of town and east toward the reservoir. The ROKA 6th Division moving up on the right out of the Chuncheon area met no opposition, but advanced only a few miles through the rough ground below the western reaches of the reservoir. Much of the PVA/KPA's gateway to safety thus remained open.

On 28 May air observers reported the ground below the reservoir all but empty of PVA/KPA forces, and the ROKA 6th Division's move to the lake's western edge confirmed the PVA escape. The division of the 20th Army deployed north and east of Hwacheon town and another division encountered on the fronts of the 24th and ROKA 2nd Divisions to the west meanwhile showed well-organized defenses and a determination to resist any further IX Corps' advance toward the Iron Triangle. Although IX Corps had gained its road center objective too late to trap the PVA coming from the X Corps' zone, the overall estimate of enemy casualties during the Corps' counterattack, including the last three days of May, exceeded 62,000. Smaller losses during the Chinese offensive raised the Corps' estimate to more than 73,000, of which 44,705 were reported killed, 19,753 wounded and 8,749 captured. During all of May, IX Corps' units themselves suffered 341 killed, 2,011 wounded and 195 missing.

=== X Corps advance to the Soyang ===
On 24 May Almond ordered an armored attack up Route 24 by the 2nd Division to seize the Umyang-ni bridge site on the Soyang. Almond directed Ruffner to assemble a task force of two tank companies, an infantry battalion, and engineers at Han'gye and start up the road at noon. He instructed Ruffner to place the task force under the commander of the division's 72nd Tank Battalion, Brubaker, then in the P'ungam-ni area where his headquarters and one company had been with Task Force Yoke and Task Force Able.

Ruffner was pressed for time to open the operation within the few hours Almond allowed. While having Brubaker flown to Han'gye, Ruffner assigned the mission to the 187th RCT, already operating along Route 24, and the two nearest tank companies; B of the 72nd, already attached to the regiment, and B of the 64th, a 3rd Division unit given to the 2nd Division earlier in one of the many unit shifts made under Corps' orders. Bowen selected his 2nd Battalion for the operation and placed his executive officer, Colonel George H. Gerhart, in command of the task force.

Despite all the haste, it was almost 11:00 by the time Brubaker reached Bowen's command post, 12:30 before Gerhart issued final instructions, and 13:00 when Brubaker started the armored point of the task force up Route 24. The point commander, Major Charles A. Newman of Brubaker's staff, led his tank platoon, engineer platoon and reconnaissance squad up the road slowly, as directed by Gerhart, with engineers in the lead probing for mines. Around 14:00 Newman halted his tanks about 6 miles (9.7 km) above Han'gye while engineers checked the road ahead and while he took time to correct faulty radio communications with the reconnaissance squad. Arriving over the scene by helicopter, Almond, already unhappy over the tardy start of the operation, landed to learn the reason for the halt. He ordered Newman to forget communications, to move his tanks at 20 miles (32 km) an hour, and to "keep going until you hit a mine."

As Newman took his tanks forward in fifth gear, Almond flew south to check on the main body of the task force, which he found still forming. Exploding with impatience, he ordered Gerhart to get the tanks moving whether or not they had infantry support. When getting trucks out of the way and getting the last tanks out of the streambed onto the road took even more time, Almond relieved Brubaker of his battalion command. Despite pressure from the general, it was midafternoon before the tanks started forward with the rest of the task force following.

Newman's point force drove rapidly through clumps of Chinese visibly rattled by the appearance of tanks and came upon the rear of some 4,000 PVA scrambling north under punishing air attacks about 1 mile (1.6 km) below Umyang-ni. Finding room to deploy in a skirmish line, Newman's tank crews opened fire with all weapons as PVA broke for the hills on both sides of the road or fled north across the Soyang, leaving behind a litter of dead, supplies, pack animals, and vehicles. By 16:30 Newman's tankers entered Umyang-ni and took up positions to continue firing on enemy groups scurrying for safety both below and above the river. By the time the main body of Task Force Gerhart arrived two hours later, Newman's unit was in full possession of the bridge site.

With Task Force Gerhart occupying the lower bank of the Soyang, Almond late on 24 May issued instructions for attacks to carry out Van Fleet's earlier order for the two-pronged trap by X Corps and ROKA I Corps. Coming out of Corps' reserve, the 23rd Infantry moving up Route 24 on the morning of 25 May was to pass through the Task Force Gerhart and establish a bridgehead over the Soyang, throwing a treadway bridge over the river, then was to seize Inje to block large enemy groups that air observers had sighted withdrawing up the P'ungam-ni-Hyon-ni-Inje road. Behind these groups, the 38th Infantry was to continue its pursuit. In getting within 10 miles (16 km) of Hyon-ni on the 24th, that regiment had had as much trouble with the roadbed giving way under its tanks and with the sharp pitch of the bordering ridges as with knots of KPA delaying forces.

After the 23rd Infantry established the Soyang bridgehead, Task Force Gerhart and the remainder of the 187th RCT were to assemble under corps control just south of Umyang-ni to form Task Force Baker for a rapid drive over Route 24, beginning on the morning of 26 May, to seize Kansong (38.378°N 128.465°E) on the coast. The 2nd Division, less the 9th Infantry, which Almond ordered into X Corps' reserve and replaced in the area between Route 24 and the P'ungam-ni-Hyon-ni-Inje road with the ROKA 5th Division, was to continue clearing its zone. At the same time, the 23rd Infantry, following Task Force Baker, was to give particular attention to preventing enemy forces from moving above the Inje-Kansong segment of Route 24. In a further remodeling, Almond dissolved Task Force Able, as previously planned, and reassigned its zone to the 3rd Division, which, with the ROKA 9th and 8th Divisions still attached, was to continue clearing its wide east flank zone. On X Corps' opposite flank, the 1st Marine Division was to continue its drive along the west side of Route 24, a drive which again on 24 May had amounted to a plodding short advance, to capture the Yanggu area.

As part of the operation to seize the Umyang-ni bridge site and subsequently the Yanggu-Inje area, Almond had directed the 1st Marine Division to have a regiment follow Task Force Gerhart up Route 24 as far as 5 miles (8.0 km) below Umyang-ni where a lateral trail intersected from the east and continued northwest toward the Soyang. Veering off at the intersection, the Marine regiment was to occupy prominent high ground 4 miles (6.4 km) west of Umyang-ni to strengthen the hold on the bridge site and to control the trail, which Almond believed enemy forces would attempt to use as a withdrawal route. Thomas pulled the 7th Marine Regiment out of reserve for the mission, but because of a late start, a shortage of trucks and enemy resistance to the leading battalion on a hill bordering the road northwest of Chaun-ni, the regiment by nightfall was still some 7 miles (11 km) short of its objective. Along the east side of the road, the 187th RCT, less its battalion with Task Force Gerhart, also had made only short advances against scattered enemy groups during the day. Thus the lateral trail, now located about halfway between the front of the Marine and airborne troops and Task Force Gerhart at Umyang-ni, remained open.

Shortly before dark, air observers reported about 2,000 enemy troops moving west on the trail onto Route 24 and beyond. They were from PVA 12th Army units, which continued to cross the road during the night, their movement not again picked up by observers until midday on 25 May as they entered the ground below the Hwacheon Reservoir in the IX Corps' zone. To protect their passage across Route 24, the PVA 106th Regiment, 34th Division organized a deep position extending over 2 miles (3.2 km) below the road's intersection with the trail to hold off attacks from the south. With no position established to the north, the intersection was open to seizure by Task Force Gerhart. But Gerhart sent no forces down the road, even after all but one of 20 trucks sent back for supplies were destroyed and all but two of the drivers were killed at the PVA position.

Alerted by the ambush of the truck convoy, Ruffner ordered the 23rd Infantry to move forward at daylight to clear the roadblock. At each position of the deep block, forces of the PVA 106th Regiment fought a dogged defense until virtually annihilated. Regimental tanks broke through on the road and reached Task Force Gerhart in the afternoon, but darkness fell before the 23rd Infantry eliminated the 106th Regiment and reached the intersection to stop for the night. Attacking cross-country on the west flank of the 23rd Infantry, the 7th Marines met little resistance but moved no farther than to come abreast. Behind the roadblock, PVA 12th Army forces meanwhile had continued to stream across Route 24 and up the trail to the northwest until the 106th Regiment was all but wiped out. Then they avoided Task Force Gerhart by veering northeast, forded the Soyang, and headed toward Yanggu.

The 38th Infantry's pursuit of enemy groups escaping up the road through Hyon-ni to Inje on 25 May was halted by stubborn resistance from two KPA battalions deployed at the junction with the road coming up from Habaejae 2 miles (3.2 km) below Sangam-ni. Supporting artillery battalions reached out for the PVA/KPA withdrawing behind the block, but many of the groups were already well up the road and out of range. To supply further evidence that the withdrawal was outdistancing the pursuit, the 9th Infantry, moving through its central zone until relieved by the ROKA 35th Regiment, 5th Division, made almost no contact, and the reinforced 3rd Division encountered only light, scattered resistance as the 7th Infantry came up to the division's road junction objectives east of Habaejae and as attached ROKA forces on the extreme east flank moved into the ground above Route 20.

Still hopeful of trapping and eliminating sizable enemy groups below Route 24, Almond urged Thomas to accelerate the 1st Marine Division's advance on Yanggu and pressed Ruffner to bridge the Soyang and seize Inje so that Task Force Baker could form and open its drive on Kansong. Almond also added a shallower swing to his attempt to cut off enemy forces ahead of ROKA I Corps, ordering the 3rd Division to organize a reinforced regimental combat team as Task Force Charlie and send it over the road leading northeastward from the Habaejae area on the morning of 26 May to take Yangyang on the coast.

There was still one opportunity to intercept a sizable enemy force. After the rain lightened enough to allow aircraft aloft in the afternoon of the 26th, observers scanned the X Corps' zone. The Hyon-ni-Inje stretch of road and connecting roads running north and west beyond Inje remained swarming with PVA/KPA troops and vehicles. Artillery supporting the 38th Infantry was far enough forward to fire on the road up to 2 miles (3.2 km) beyond Hyon-ni, and during the remaining hours of daylight fighter-bombers attacked enemy groups in and around Inje while B-26s laced the forces between Inje and Hyon-ni with 13 tons of bombs, all producing a high score of casualties. The pursuit of the 38th Infantry, however, came to an abrupt halt 3 miles (4.8 km) short of Hyon-ni in the face of strong rearguard action by the KPA 19th Regiment, 13th Division. Below the 38th, the 3rd Division's Task Force Charlie built around the 7th Infantry Regiment moved only 4 miles (6.4 km) toward Yangyang before minefields and a destroyed bridge blocked any further advance. To the north along Route 24, the attack of the 23rd Infantry also was stopped short. Sweeping one enemy group off high ground bordering Route 24 below Umyang-ni, the regiment reached and crossed the Soyang before midday. Leaving a battalion to protect engineers while they bridged the river during the afternoon, Chiles sent the remainder of his regiment toward Inje. But the advance ended some 5 miles (8.0 km) from the town when stubborn KPA 12th Division forces held blocking positions until well past dark.

A swifter advance was clearly required if enemy passage through the Inje road center was to be blocked and any substantial part of the PVA/KPA throng on the Hyon-ni-Inje road rolled up from the south. The PVA 27th Army was already above Route 24 en route through the area above the Hwacheon Reservoir to take position behind the 20th Army along Route 17, and KPA V Corps was beginning to organize defenses between the reservoir and the outskirts of Inje. The latter's 6th Division entering the Yanggu area would oppose the 1st Marine Division, which on 26 May was still moving forces up to the Soyang for its attack on the town. As the 23rd Infantry had discovered, the 12th Division was coming in alongside the 6th to defend the ground reaching east to Inje. Still on the road below Inje, the 32nd Division was to move into a corps reserve position. Farthest south on the road, the KPA II Corps planned to deploy the 27th Division around Inje, the 2nd Division next to the east, and the 13th Division, currently covering X Corps' rear, on the east flank. Other than this jam of KPA troops between Hyon-ni and Inje, the only PVA/KPA forces still below Route 24 were stragglers and isolated groups that had become separated from their units in the confusion of the withdrawal.

Urging speedy attacks to bag the PVA/KPA forces remaining below Route 24, Almond directed Task Force Baker to lead the attack on Inje on 27 May, leaving bypassed enemy troops to the left and right of the road to the following 23rd Infantry, and to be prepared to proceed to Kansong in coordination with the advance of ROKA I Corps toward the same objective. Since Paik's forces had entered Yangyang on 26 May, Almond meanwhile canceled the Task Force Charlie attack toward the town.

Rain during the morning of 27 May and heavy low clouds throughout the day limited flights by air observers, but they were able to confirm a continuous PVA/KPA exodus to the north. They reported one group of some 7,000 moving along the Hyon-ni-Inje road ahead of the 38th Infantry. The regiment pursued with tanks on the road and an infantry battalion moving overland on each side. The remaining battalion was to move up after Hyon-ni was taken and, with the tanks, push on to Inje. But KPA blocking positions and minefields covered by fire so slowed the advance that Hyon-ni was not occupied until dusk, and the drive on Inje was postponed.

On Route 24, Task Force Baker fought through stubborn resistance and entered Inje at 14:30, but it was evening before the task force and two battalions of the following 23rd Infantry cleared the town. No time remained for the task force to drive on toward Kansong. To the west, the 7th Marines crossed the Soyang River to open the 1st Marine Division's northward attack to seize Yanggu, but though the regiment encountered only scattered enemy groups, it was still 6 miles (9.7 km) from the town at nightfall.

=== Operation Piledriver ===
Since it was obvious by 27 May that the slowness of the Eighth Army in seizing its road center objectives had allowed most major PVA units, mangled as they were, to escape entrapment, Van Fleet laid out Operation Piledriver to extend the reach of the counterattack. In the west, I and IX Corps were to seize Line Wyoming to cut PVA/KPA lines of communication at the base of the Iron Triangle and to block the main roads running southeast out of the triangle toward the Hwacheon Reservoir and Chuncheon. The weight of the western attack was to be in the I Corps' zone. Reinforced by the 3rd Division and its attached ROKA 9th Division, to be transferred from X Corps, and backed up by the 187th RCT, also to be taken from X Corps and placed in army reserve in Seoul, Milburn was to seize the Ch'orwon-Kumhwa area. In a narrowed IX Corps' zone, Hoge's forces were to occupy commanding ground beyond Hwacheon town to block the roads reaching southeast out of Kumhwa.

East of the reservoir, after completing operations to capture the Yanggu-Inje area and reach Kansong on the east coast, X Corps and ROKA I Corps were to seize and establish defensive positions along a newly drawn segment of Line Kansas running northeast from the reservoir across the southern rim of a hollow circle of mountains aptly called the Punchbowl to the coastal town of Kojin-ni (38.444°N 128.448°E), 5 miles (8.0 km) above Kansong. Following generally the same prominent ridge traced by earlier phase lines in the sector, the new Kansas segment lay well above Route 24. Once on the adjusted line, both Corps could use the road as their main supply route and, in addition, could receive supplies through the port at Kansong.

Van Fleet had in mind another use for Kansong as part of an operation he planned to open on 6 June to isolate and destroy PVA/KPA forces who had succeeded in withdrawing above Route 24 into the area northeast of the Hwacheon Reservoir. Under X Corps' control, part of the 1st Marine Division was to stage through Kansong for a quick shore-to-shore movement to establish a beachhead at the junction of Route 17 and the coastal road in the T'ongch'on area some 28 miles (45 km) to the north. The remainder of the division was to join the beachhead by moving up the coastal road. Once reassembled, the Marine division was to attack down Route 17 while IX Corps drove up the same road out of the Kumhwa area to seal off the area to the southeast. PVA/KPA forces caught in the trap were then to be systematically destroyed. Van Fleet needed Ridgway's approval for an operation of these proportions beyond Lines Kansas and Wyoming, and on 28 May he made that request, urging in his message that the "potentiality of enemy defeat should override any objections." Unconvinced that such was the case, Ridgway flew to Seoul late on the 28th. There he presented to Van Fleet all of the reasons why the T'ongch'on operation should not be undertaken. The sum of his reasons was that the possible benefits of the operation did not justify the risks entailed. The Eighth Army's mission, he reminded Van Fleet, was to exact maximum enemy losses at minimum cost while maintaining UN forces intact, and this mission could best be carried out in a gradual advance to Lines Kansas and Wyoming. In that connection, Ridgway did approve Van Fleet's adjustment of Line Kansas east of the Hwacheon Reservoir. Looking ahead to the time when the Eighth Army reached Lines Kansas and Wyoming, Ridgway before leaving Korea on 29 May instructed Van Fleet to prepare an estimate of the situation covering the next 60 days along with recommendations on operations. As he undertook this contingency planning, Van Fleet on 1 June directed his Corps commanders to fortify Lines Kansas and Wyoming upon reaching them and thereafter to conduct limited objective attacks, reconnaissance in force, and patrolling.

On 28 May to advance I Corps' right to Line Wyoming, Milburn planned an attack by three divisions, the 1st Cavalry Division moving along the west side of Route 33 to occupy the segment of the line slanting southwest of Ch'orwon to the Imjin River, the 3rd Division advancing on the Route 33 axis to take the Ch'orwon base of the Iron Triangle and the 25th Division attacking astride Route 3 to seize the triangle's eastern base at Kumhwa. In the IX Corps' zone, Hoge also organized a three-division attack to occupy the Wyoming trace reaching southeastward from Kumhwa to the Hwacheon Reservoir. Nearest Kumhwa, the ROKA 2nd Division and the 7th Division were to seize Wyoming objectives along and above the stretch of Route 17 leading northwest into the Iron Triangle from Hwacheon town. On the right, the ROKA 6th Division was to advance above the western half of the Hwacheon Reservoir between Route 17 and the Bukhan River.

While Milburn and Hoge planned attacks to start on 3 June in the I Corps' zone and 5 June in the IX Corps' zone, forces edging above Line Kansas in preliminary advances in both Corps zones encountered stiff opposition. As Ridgway had predicted, the PVA were determined to hold the Iron Triangle and adjacent ground as long as possible. Then drenching rains during the last two days of May began to turn roads into boggy tracks and, along with low clouds and fog, limited close air support and both air and ground observation. Two clear days followed, but as the full attacks got under way on 3 June rainstorms returned to hamper operations through the 5th.

Aided by the bad weather, PVA delaying forces fighting doggedly from dug-in regimental positions arranged in depth held the advance to a crawl through 8 June, then finally gave way under the pressure and began a phased withdrawal, moving north in what air observers estimated as battalion-size groups. Against declining resistance and in drier weather, the assault divisions occupied their Line Wyoming objectives between 9 and 11 June. In the I Corps' zone, Milburn sent tank-infantry patrols up each side of the Iron Triangle on 13 June to investigate P'yonggang at its apex. The patrols met no resistance en route and found P'yonggang deserted. The PVA defenders of the triangle had taken up positions in commanding ground northeast and northwest of the town. IX Corps' forces reconnoitering northeast of Kumhwa located PVA defenses below the town of Kumsong. Rimmed on the north by PVA and on the south by the I and IX Corps, the coveted road complex in the Iron Triangle area now lay largely unusable in no-man's land.

East of the Hwacheon Reservoir, KPA forces opposing the X Corps' advance gave ground even more grudgingly than the PVA in the Iron Triangle. It was the end of May before the 1st Marine Division captured Yanggu and longer before other Corps' forces completed mop-up operations in the ground east of Inje and Hyon-ni. Two regiments of Marines moved north of Yanggu on 1 June, but only on the 4th could Almond open a coordinated attack by the 1st Marine Division and ROKA 5th Division toward Line Kansas and the Punchbowl some 6 miles (9.7 km) above the Corps front. By that date ROKA I Corps, advancing three divisions abreast along the east coast, had driven through spotty resistance and occupied its Line Kansas segment slanting across the first high ridge above Route 24. Having far outdistanced X Corps, Paik was obliged to defend his inland flank in strength against the possibility of PVA/KPA attacks from the direction of the Punchbowl.

The 6 miles (9.7 km) attack to the Punchbowl involved Almond's forces in some of the most difficult conditions of combat. In some areas, sharply pitched axial ridges limited advances to extremely narrow fronts; in others, repetitions of steep transverse ridges forced assault troops to make arduous climbs and descents over and over again. The two main arterial roads, through the Sochon River valley in the west and the Soyang River valley in the east, were heavily mined. Other access roads, the few that existed, winding through the mountains were narrow and required substantial engineering work before supply trucks could use them. Spates of rain frequently caused landslides that blocked the roads or so slickened them that trucks skidded off at hairpin turns. From time to time the rain and fog limited air support and observation. Most difficult of all were the KPA defenders. They were in well organized fortified positions on every ridge; they gave no ground voluntarily; and, after losing a position, they counterattacked quickly in an attempt to regain it.

On 8 June Almond widened his attack, inserting a regiment of the ROKA 7th Division on the left to clear the ground above the eastern half of the Hwacheon Reservoir while the 1st Marine Division concentrated on taking the lower lip of the Punchbowl and the segment of Line Kansas astride the Sochon River valley to the southwest. Accordingly, Thomas, the Marine division commander, committed his reserves on the 9th so that he had four regiments in the attack. First to slug through the bitter KPA resistance was the regiment of the ROKA 7th Division, which reached Line Kansas on 10 June. The Marines and ROKA 5th Division took a week longer to gain full possession of their objectives.

With the seizure of Line Wyoming and the adjusted segment of Line Kansas in the east, the Eighth Army had reached its allowed limit of general advance in support of efforts to open cease-fire negotiations. As yet there had been no clear sign that Chinese and North Korean authorities favored that kind of resolution, but there had been a search for a way to open armistice talks.

== Aftermath ==
On 9 June Van Fleet offered Ridgway several plans for limited offensive action to keep PVA/KPA forces off balance, three of which he proposed to execute immediately after the Eighth Army reached Lines Kansas and Wyoming. Each of the three called for a raid on enemy troops and supplies within a specific area. In the west, a division was to hit Kaesong, the medieval capital of Korea on Route 1 some 10 miles (16 km) above the Imjin. In the central region, an armored task force was to attack P'yonggang at the apex of the Iron Triangle and the 1st Marine Division was to make an amphibious landing at T'ongch'on and attack southwest over Route 17 to join Eighth Army lines at Kumhwa. Ridgway agreed with Van Fleet's concept of holding the Eighth Army along the Kansas-Wyoming front and punishing enemy forces with limited attacks, but refused the 1st Marine Division operation, presumably for the same reasons he had refused Van Fleet's earlier T'ongch'on landing proposal. He approved the other attack plans, but they were to be executed only if intelligence confirmed that worthwhile targets existed in the Kaesong and P'yonggang areas.

Ridgway then requested recommendations on the best location for the Eighth Army during a cease-fire, Van Fleet recommended Line Kansas because of its suitability for a strong defense, however, he pointed out that since a cease-fire agreement might require opposing forces to withdraw several miles from the line of contact to create a buffer zone, the Eighth Army must be well forward of Line Kansas at the time an agreement was reached. Ridgway agreed that Line Kansas would be the best location for the Eighth Army if armistice negotiations started soon and assured Van Fleet that if possible he would advise him of forthcoming negotiations in time to allow him to move at least part of his forces to a line of contact 20 miles (32 km) above Kansas. At the same time, since remaining behind a self-imposed line could prove exceedingly costly if the PVA/KPA leadership refused to negotiate or if they protracted negotiations while they prepared a major offensive, Ridgway directed his own planning staff to explore, as a long range matter, the feasibility and possible profits of penetrating more deeply into North Korea. The staff considered various schemes of maneuver, selecting objective lines on the basis of whether they could be held as cease-fire lines and weighing in particular the logistical problems that would attend advancing to them. Of several concepts developed, Ridgway favored one posing a three-phase offensive to occupy the Pyongyang-Wonsan line. The first phase called for an advance on Wonsan in two columns, one moving up the east coast road, the other over the Seoul-Wonsan axis. In the second step, an amphibious force was to land at Wonsan to assist the overland advance. In the finale, Eighth Army forces would drive northwestward and seize Pyongyang. Ridgway passed the outline to Van Fleet and instructed him to submit detailed plans for the operation by 10 July.

Ridgway had had his planning staff plot an outpost line 10 miles (16 km) above Line Kansas and a "cease-fire" line another ten miles forward. By occupying the deeper line the Eighth Army would be able to make a ten-mile withdrawal from the line of contact, a withdrawal that an armistice agreement might require and still retain its Kansas positions and a suitable outpost line of resistance. On 25 June Ridgway sent a staff officer to Korea to get Van Fleet's views on seizing the proposed ceasefire line. Two weeks earlier Van Fleet had considered such an Eighth Army advance essential, but now, in view of the recent hard fighting to reach the Iron Triangle and the Punchbowl, he advised against the deeper move as potentially too costly. On 26 June Ridgway went to Korea, where after further discussing the matter with Van Fleet he agreed that while a deep advance was tactically and logistically feasible, the price would not be worth the results.

On 30 June as instructed by the Joint Chiefs of Staff, Ridgway broadcast a message to the Chinese and North Korean leadership to open ceasefire negotiations. The following day the Chinese and North Korean leadership broadcast their acceptance of ceasefire negotiations to take place at Kaesong starting on 10 July.

As the first armistice conference convened, combat operations continued at the diminished pace that had set in after the Eighth Army ended its general advance at Lines Kansas and Wyoming. Since that time, Eighth Army forces had conducted only extensive patrolling and a few limited attacks, the two largest an unsuccessful attempt in the X Corps' sector to establish an outpost on the western rim of the Punchbowl and a successful attempt in the I Corps' sector to clear the Iron Triangle of PVA who after mid-June had crept back into the Sobang Hills, an island of mountains within the triangle. Otherwise, Eighth Army was preoccupied with developing defenses along the Kansas-Wyoming Line. As directed by Van Fleet, Line Kansas was being organized as the main line of resistance with defensive positions arranged in depth and elaborately fortified. Forces deployed on the looping Line Wyoming were developing hasty field fortifications from which to delay and blunt the force of enemy attacks before withdrawing to assigned main line positions. To deepen the defense further, patrol bases were being established ahead of the Kansas-Wyoming front on terrain features dominating logical enemy approach routes. To prevent PVA/KPA scouts reconnoitering Eighth Army defenses, the battle area was being cleared of Korean civilians from 5 miles (8.0 km) behind Line Kansas northward to the line of patrol bases. Lending haste to the preparation of defenses was an expectation that the PVA/KPA would use the respite from Eighth Army pressure to rehabilitate their units and reconstitute an attack force quickly. Familiar signs of enemy attack preparations had appeared: main forces were off the line for refitting; screening forces on the periphery of the Kansas-Wyoming Line vigorously opposed the Eighth Army's ground reconnaissance; supplies were moved into forward dumps; and some prisoners mentioned a forthcoming "Sixth Phase Offensive." By early July the Eighth Army intelligence officer was predicting an enemy offensive anytime after midmonth. He revised his estimate after armistice negotiations started, predicting then that there would be no enemy attack unless the negotiations failed, but he expected a continuation of PVA/KPA offensive preparations.

== See also ==
- Chinese spring offensive
- Battle of the Soyang River
