= 84th Division (People's Republic of China) =

84th Division (1949–53) 84th Infantry Division (1953–60) 84th Army Division (1960-85)
- Active: 1949.2 - 1985.8
- Country: People's Republic of China
- Branch: People's Liberation Army Ground Force
- Type: Infantry
- Size: Division
- Part of: 28th Army Corps
- Garrison/HQ: Taiyuan, Shanxi
- Engagements: Chinese Civil War

The 84th Division (Chinese: 第84师) was created in February 1949 under the Regulation of the Redesignations of All Organizations and Units of the Army, issued by Central Military Commission on November 1, 1948,: basing on the 30th Division, 10th Column of the Huadong Field Army, which was just activated in January 1949.

The division was part of the 28th Corps. Under the flag of the 84th Division, it was engaged in several battles in the Chinese Civil War, including the Shanghai Campaign.

In October 1949, its 251st Regiment was destroyed during the Battle of Guningtou. In January 1950, 251st Regiment was reconstituted from the 301st Regiment, 101st Division.

In August 1950, Artillery Regiment, 84th Division was activated, which was later renamed as 364th Artillery Regiment in 1953.

In April 1960 the division was renamed as 84th Army Division (Chinese: 陆军第84师). It was then composed of:

- 250th Regiment
- 251st Regiment
- 252nd Regiment
- 364th Artillery Regiment

In June 1962, the division was detached from the 28th Army Corps and put under the operational control of the Minbei Command Headquarters. The division was then stationing in Lianjiang, Fujian.

In October 1964, the division was reorganized: 251st Regiment was transferred to Fujian Provincial Military District as an independent unit, while a new 251st Regiment was reconstituted by the 28th Army Corps and 31st Army Corps.

In June 1969 the division returned to 28th Army Corps' control.

In November 1969, the division was redeployed to Taiyuan, Shanxi along with the 28th Army Corps. In December 364th Artillery Regiment was renamed as Artillery Regiment, 84th Army Division.

From April 1976, the division was maintained as a category B unit.

From April 1979, the division was maintained as a category A unit.

From May 1983, the division was maintained as a category B unit.

In August 1985 the division was disbanded

- Headquarters, 84th Division was reconstituted into Headquarters, Tank Brigade, 27th Army;
- 250th Infantry Regiment was transferred to 81st Motorized Infantry Division;
- 251st Infantry Regiment was reconstituted into Communications Regiment, 28th Army;
- 252nd Infantry Regiment was transferred to 114th Motorized Infantry Division;
- Artillery Regiment, 84th Division was merged into Artillery Brigade, 28th Army.
