= 193rd Brigade =

193rd Brigade may refer to:

- 193rd Mechanized Infantry Brigade, People's Republic of China
- 193rd Grenadier Brigade, Wehrmacht, Germany
- 193rd (2nd Argyll and Sutherland Highlanders) Brigade, United Kingdom
- 193rd Infantry Brigade (United States)

== See also ==
- 193rd Regiment (disambiguation)
