= 189th Brigade =

189th Brigade may refer to:

- 189th Motorized Infantry Brigade (People's Republic of China)
- 189th (2nd York and Durham) Brigade, United Kingdom
- 189th Brigade (United Kingdom)
- 189th Infantry Brigade (United States)

== See also ==
- 189th Regiment (disambiguation)
