= 16th Artillery Division =

People's Republic of China military unit

16th Artillery Division (1970-85) Artillery Brigade, 63rd Army (1985-2003) Artillery Brigade, 27th Army (2003-17)
- Active: 1970.2 - 2017.4
- Country: People's Republic of China
- Branch: People's Liberation Army
- Type: Division
- Role: Artillery
- Part of: 27th Army

The 16th Artillery Division(Chinese: 炮兵第16师) was a military formation of the People's Liberation Army of the People's Republic of China.

The formation of the division started on November 9, 1969. On December 29, 1969, the activation was complete. The division was formally activated on February 15, 1970.

The division was then composed of:

- Division Headquarters - Jiexiu, Shanxi Province
- 61st Artillery Regiment (122mm Howitzer Type-54 * 36) - Pingyao, Shanxi Province
- 62nd Artillery Regiment (122mm Howitzer Type-54 * 36) - Fenyang, Shanxi Province
- 63rd Artillery Regiment (122mm Gun Type-59 * 36) - Xiaoyi, Shanxi Province
- 64th Artillery Regiment (122mm Gun Type-59 * 36) - Lingshi, Shanxi Province
- 212th Artillery Regiment (130mm MRL Type-63 * 36) - Jiexiu, Shanxi Province

The division was a part of the Artillery of the Beijing Military Region.

In May 1972, the 64th Artillery Regiment was reequipped with 152mm Gun-Howitzer Type-66.

On April 1, 1983, the division was attached to 63rd Army Corps' control.

In 1985, the division was reduced and reorganized as the Artillery Brigade, 63rd Army(Chinese: 第63集团军炮兵旅):

- The 61st, 64th, and a part of the 212th Artillery Regiments were detached from the division in August 1985.
- Artillery Brigade, 63rd Army was formally activated on October 5, 1985.

The brigade was transferred to the 27th Army following 63rd's inactivation in 2003, during which it was renamed as the Artillery Brigade, 27th Army(Chinese: 第27集团军炮兵旅).

In April 2017 the brigade was disbanded along with the 27th Army.
