= 235th Brigade =

235th Brigade may refer to:

- 235th Mechanized Infantry Brigade, People's Republic of China
- 235th Brigade, Royal Field Artillery, United Kingdom
