= 189th Division (2nd Formation) (People's Republic of China) =

186th Division (1969) 189th Division (1969-1985)
- Active: 1969.10 - 1985.7
- Country: People's Republic of China
- Branch: People's Liberation Army
- Type: Division
- Role: Infantry
- Part of: 63rd Army Corps

In October 1969 186th Army Division(Chinese: 陆军第186师) was formed from 2nd Engineer District, Engineer Corps of Beijing Military Region. The division was a part of 63rd Army Corps.

In December 1969 the division was renamed as 189th Army Division(Chinese: 陆军第189师), and all its regiments were re-designated as:

- 565th Infantry Regiment;
- 566th Infantry Regiment;
- 567th Infantry Regiment;
- Artillery Regiment.

In July 1985 the division was disbanded.
