= 188th Mechanized Infantry Brigade =

Brigade of the People's Liberation Army

188th Division (1949–53) 188th Infantry Division (1953–60) 188th Army Division (1960–85) 188th Infantry Division (1985–2003) 188th Mechanized Infantry Brigade (2003–17) 188th Heavy Combined Arms Brigade (2017–)
- Active: 1949.1 -
- Country: People's Republic of China
- Branch: People's Liberation Army Ground Force, People's Volunteer Army
- Type: Combined Arms, Mechanized Infantry
- Size: Brigade
- Part of: 82nd Group Army
- Garrison/HQ: Taiyuan, Shanxi (before 2017)
- Nickname: "Wild 8th Brigade" (Chinese: 野八旅)
- Engagements: Chinese Civil War, Korean War, Vietnam War

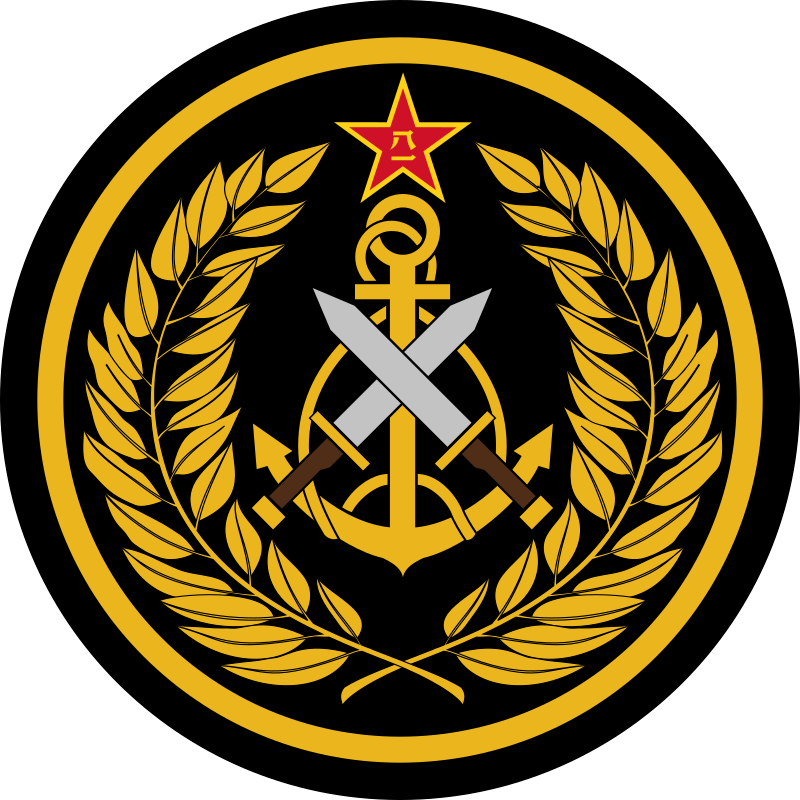
Patch of People’s Liberation Army Navy Marine Corps

The 188th Division (Chinese: 第188师) was created in January 1949 under the Regulation of the Redesignations of All Organizations and Units of the Army, issued by Central Military Commission on November 1, 1948, basing on the 8th Brigade, 3rd Column of the Jinchaji Military Region. Its history can be traced to the Hebei Guerrilla Army, formed in December 1937.

The division was part of 63rd Corps. Under the flag of 188th division, it took part in several major battles in the Chinese Civil War.

In February 1951, the division entered Korea with the Corps HQ as a part of People's Volunteer Army. During its deployment in Korea, it took part in the Fifth Phase Offensive and the Battle of Cheorwon, during which the division suffered heavy casualties but halted the UN offensive.

In January 1953, 393rd Tank Self-Propelled Artillery Regiment was formed and attached to the division.

In October 1953, the division returned from Korea and stationed at Handan, Hebei, becoming the 188th Infantry Division (Chinese: 步兵第188师) of the National Defense Force.

In 1960, the division was renamed as the 188th Army Division (Chinese: 陆军第188师). By then, the division was composed of:

- 562nd Infantry Regiment;
- 563rd Infantry Regiment;
- 564th Infantry Regiment;
- 393rd Tank Self-Propelled Artillery Regiment;
- 568th Artillery Regiment.

In 1962, the division was designated as a "Northern" unit, Catalogue A in War-time Structure, making it a "big" division of 12,457 personnel. the division was shortly moved to Fujian province for an emergency alert deployment.

In May 1966, the division moved to Huolu, Hebei after 189th Army Division's transfer to Beijing.

In December 1966, following the outbreak of the Cultural Revolution, the division moved to Beijing and stationed in Xicheng district for security mission. In December, the division returned to its barracks.

From January 27, 1868, to March 9, 1969, Anti-Aircraft Artillery Battalion of 188th Army Division, reinforced by Anti-Aircraft Artillery Battery of 3rd Tank Regiment, 1st Tank Division and attaching to 9th Anti-Aircraft Artillery Division of the Air Force, entered North Vietnam for anti-aircraft missions in Lang Son area.

On September 6, 1968, 393rd Tank Self-Propelled Artillery Regiment was detached from the division and transferred to newly formed 6th Tank Division and became 23rd Tank Regiment in December 1969.

The division was not affected during the December 1969 army re-designation, except for its 568th Artillery Regiment was renamed as Artillery Regiment, 188th Army Division.

On February 22, 1970, the division moved to Baotou for defense purpose. Shortly after the division returned to its barracks.

From January 14, 1976, to November 1982, the division maintained as a northern unit, catalogue A.

From November 1982 to 1985, the division maintained as a catalogue A division.

In 1985, the division was renamed as the 188th Infantry Division (Chinese: 步兵第188师) and reorganized as a northern motorized infantry division, catalogue A. The division was then composed of:

- 562nd Motorized Infantry Regiment;
- 563rd Motorized Infantry Regiment;
- 564th Motorized Infantry Regiment;
- Tank Regiment (former 28th Tank Regiment, 7th Tank Division);
- Artillery Regiment;
- Anti-aircraft Artillery Regiment.

The division took part in the enforced martial law and the crackdown on protests in Beijing, June 1989.

In 1998, the division was reorganized: 564th Motorized Infantry Regiment was disbanded, and Tank Regiment, 188th Infantry Division was renamed as Armored Regiment, 188th Infantry Division. The division was then composed of:

- 562nd Motorized Infantry Regiment;
- 563rd Motorized Infantry Regiment;
- Armored Regiment;
- Artillery Regiment;
- Anti-aircraft Artillery Regiment.

In 2003, the division was reduced as the 188th Mechanized Infantry Brigade (Chinese: 机械化步兵第188旅) and transferred to the 27th Group Army following 63rd's disbandment.

In 2017, the brigade was renamed as the 188th Heavy Combined Arms Brigade (Chinese: 重型合成第188旅) and transferred to the 82nd Group Army following 27th's disbandment.
