= 82nd Motorized Infantry Brigade =

82nd Division (1949–53) 82nd Infantry Division (1953–60) 82nd Army Division (1960–85) 82nd Infantry Division (1985–98) 82nd Motorized Infantry Brigade (1998–2017) 81st Special Operations Brigade (2017-)
- Active: 1949.2 -
- Country: People's Republic of China
- Branch: People's Liberation Army Ground Force
- Type: Special Force
- Size: Brigade
- Part of: 81st Group Army
- Garrison/HQ: Datong, Shanxi
- Engagements: Chinese Civil War

The 82nd Division (Chinese: 第82师) was created in February 1949 under the Regulation of the Redesignations of All Organizations and Units of the Army, issued by Central Military Commission on November 1, 1948, basing on the 28th Division, 10th Column of the Huadong Field Army. Its history can be traced to the 7th Division, Shandong Military Region, formed in August 1946.

The division was part of the 28th Corps. Under the flag of the 82nd Division, it was engaged in several major battles in the Chinese Civil War, including the Menglianggu Campaign, Laiwu Campaign, Jinan Campaign, Huaihai Campaign and Shanghai Campaign.

In October 1949, 244th Regiment, 82nd Division was eliminated during the Battle of Guningtou. In January 1950, 244th Regiment was reconstituted from the 302nd Regiment, 101st Division and the remnants of the 244th.

In July 1950, Artillery Regiment, 82nd Division was activated, which was later renamed as 362nd Artillery Regiment in 1953.

In 1958 the division took part in the shelling of Kinmen Islands.

In April 1960 the division was renamed as 82nd Army Division (Chinese: 陆军第82师). It was then composed of:

- 244th Regiment
- 245th Regiment
- 246th Regiment
- 362nd Artillery Regiment

In November 1969, the division was redeployed to Hongdong, Shanxi along with the 28th Army Corps. In December 362nd Artillery Regiment was renamed as Artillery Regiment, 82nd Army Division.

In August 1985 the division was reconstituted as a northern infantry division, category B and renamed as the 82nd Infantry Division (Chinese: 步兵第82师). The division was then stationed in Datong, Shanxi. The division was then composed of:

- 244th Infantry Regiment
- 245th Infantry Regiment
- 246th Infantry Regiment
- Artillery Regiment

The division took part in the martial law enforcement and the crackdown on protests in Beijing in May and June 1989 along with the 28th Army Headquarters. On June 4, 1989, when marching eastward at Muxidi (Chinese: 木樨地), the division was blocked by thousands of protesters. With the deliberate indulgence by its army commissar Zhang Mingchun(Chinese: 张明春), and army commander He Yanran (Chinese: 何燕然), soldiers from the division mutinied and moved against orders. The division failed to meet its objective in the incident.

In September 1998, the division was reduced as the 82nd Motorized Infantry Brigade (Chinese: 摩托化步兵第82旅) and transferred to 63rd Army following 28th Army's disbandment.

In September 2003, the brigade was transferred to 27th Army following 63rd Army's disbandment.

In April 2017, the brigade was again transferred to 81st Army following 27th Army's disbandment. It was then reconstituted as 81st Special Operations Brigade(Chinese: 特战第81旅), as a functioning part of the 81st Army
