= 193rd Mechanized Infantry Brigade =

193rd Division (1949-53) 193rd Infantry Division (1953-60) 193rd Army Division (1960-85) 193rd Infantry Division (1985-2011) 193rd Mechanized Infantry Brigade (2011-17) 193rd Medium Combined Arms Brigade (2017-)
- Active: 1949.2 -
- Country: People's Republic of China
- Branch: People's Liberation Army Ground Force
- Type: Combined Arms, Mechanized Infantry
- Size: Brigade
- Part of: 83rd Group Army (193rd Brigade); 81st Group Army (194th Brigade)
- Garrison/HQ: Xuanhua, Hebei
- Nickname: Red first Division (Chinese: 红一师)
- Engagements: Chinese Civil War, Korean War

The 193rd Division (Chinese: 第193师) was created in February 1949 under the Regulation of the Redesignations of All Organizations and Units of the Army, issued by Central Military Commission on November 1, 1948, basing on the 22nd Brigade, 8th Column, 2nd Army Group of Huabei Military Region. Its history could be traced to the famous 1st Division of Chinese Workers' and Peasants' Red Army.

The division was composed of 577th, 578th and 579th Infantry Regiments. As a part of 65th Corps the division took part in major battles during the Chinese Civil War, including the Pingjin Campaign, Lanzhou Campaign and Ningxia Campaign.

In December 1950, Artillery Regiment, 193rd Division was activated. Since 1952 the regiment was renamed as 573rd Artillery Regiment. In 1952 the division was renamed as the 193rd Infantry Division (Chinese: 步兵第193师).

In February 1951 the division entered Korea as a part of People's Volunteer Army. During its deployment in Korea the division took part in the Fifth Phase Offensive and several major battles, during which it allegedly inflicted 8960 casualties to confronting UN Forces (including 86 POWs). In October 1953 the division pulled out from Korea.

In November 1953, 398th Tank Self-Propelled Artillery Regiment was activated. By then the division was composed of:

- 577th Infantry Regiment;
- 578th Infantry Regiment;
- 579th Infantry Regiment;
- 398th Tank Self-Propelled Artillery Regiment;
- 573rd Artillery Regiment.

In April 1960 the division was renamed as the 193rd Army Division (Chinese: 陆军第193师).

In September 1968, 398th Tank Self-Propelled Artillery Regiment was detached from the division and joined 7th Tank Division as 28th Tank Regiment. In December 1969, 573rd Artillery Regiment was renamed as Artillery Regiment, 193rd Army Division.

In 1985, the division was renamed as the 193rd Infantry Division (Chinese: 步兵第193师) again, and reorganized as a northern motorized infantry division, catalogue A. Tank Regiment, 193rd Infantry Division was activated from HQ and 1st Battalion, 22nd Tank Regiment, 6th Tank Division, Independent Tank Battalion of 1st and 4th Garrison Division of Beijing Military Region. Anti-Aircraft Artillery Regiment, 193rd Infantry Division was also activated.

From 1985 to 1998 the division was composed of:

- 577th Motorized Infantry Regiment;
- 578th Motorized Infantry Regiment;
- 579th Motorized Infantry Regiment;
- Tank Regiment;
- Artillery Regiment;
- Anti-Aircraft Artillery Regiment.

In 1998 578th Motorized Infantry Regiment was disbanded. Tank Regiment, 193rd Infantry Division was reorganized as Armored Regiment, 193rd Infantry Division.

In 2010, 577th Motorized Infantry Regiment was re-equipped with ZSL-92B APCs and converted to a mechanized infantry regiment.

In late 2011 the division was split into two brigades: the 193rd Mechanized Infantry Brigade (Chinese: 机械化步兵第193旅) and 194th Mechanized Infantry Brigade. Until then the division was composed of:

- 577th Mechanized Infantry Regiment;
- 579th Motorized Infantry Regiment;
- Armored Regiment;
- Artillery Regiment;
- Anti-Aircraft Artillery Regiment.

In April 2017 the brigade was renamed as the 193rd Medium Combined Arms Brigade (Chinese: 中型合成第193旅), while the 194th was renamed as the 194th Heavy Combined Arms Brigade (Chinese: 重型合成第194旅).

The 193rd brigade is now a maneuver part of the PLA 83rd Group Army.

The 194th brigade is now a maneuver part of the PLA 81st Group Army.
