= 6th Armored Division (People's Republic of China) =

6th Tank Division (1967–98) 6th Armored Division (1998–2017) 6th Heavy Combined Arms Brigade (2017–)
- Country: China
- Type: Armored
- Size: Division
- Part of: 82nd Group Army
- Garrison/HQ: Luoyang

The 6th Tank Division (Chinese: 坦克第6师) was formed on September 10, 1968 from 6th Independent Tank Regiment, 392nd Tank Self-Propelled Artillery Regiment from 187th Army Division, 393rd Tank Self-Propelled Artillery Regiment from 188th Army Division and 401st Tank Self-Propelled Artillery Regiment from 196th Army Division.

As of September 2, 1969, the division was composed of:

- 21st Tank Regiment (former 6th Independent Tank Regiment);
- 22nd Tank Regiment (former 392nd Tank Self-Propelled Artillery Regiment);
- 23rd Tank Regiment (former 393rd Tank Self-Propelled Artillery Regiment);
- 24th Tank Regiment (former 401st Tank Self-Propelled Artillery Regiment).

On September 1, 1971, 23rd Tank Regiment was detached and renamed as Tank Regiment, 81st Army Division.

In March 1983 Armored Infantry Regiment and Artillery Regiment were activated. From 1983 to 1984 the division maintained an army tank division, catalogue B.

On March 25, 1983, the division was attached to 38th Army.

In early 1984 the division was regrouped as one of the two combined arms army tank divisions(the other one was 3rd Tank Division): the Armored Infantry Regiment was renamed as Mechanized Infantry Regiment, and added a tank battalion and an additional armored infantry battalion. Antiaircraft Artillery Regiment activated.

By then the division was composed of:

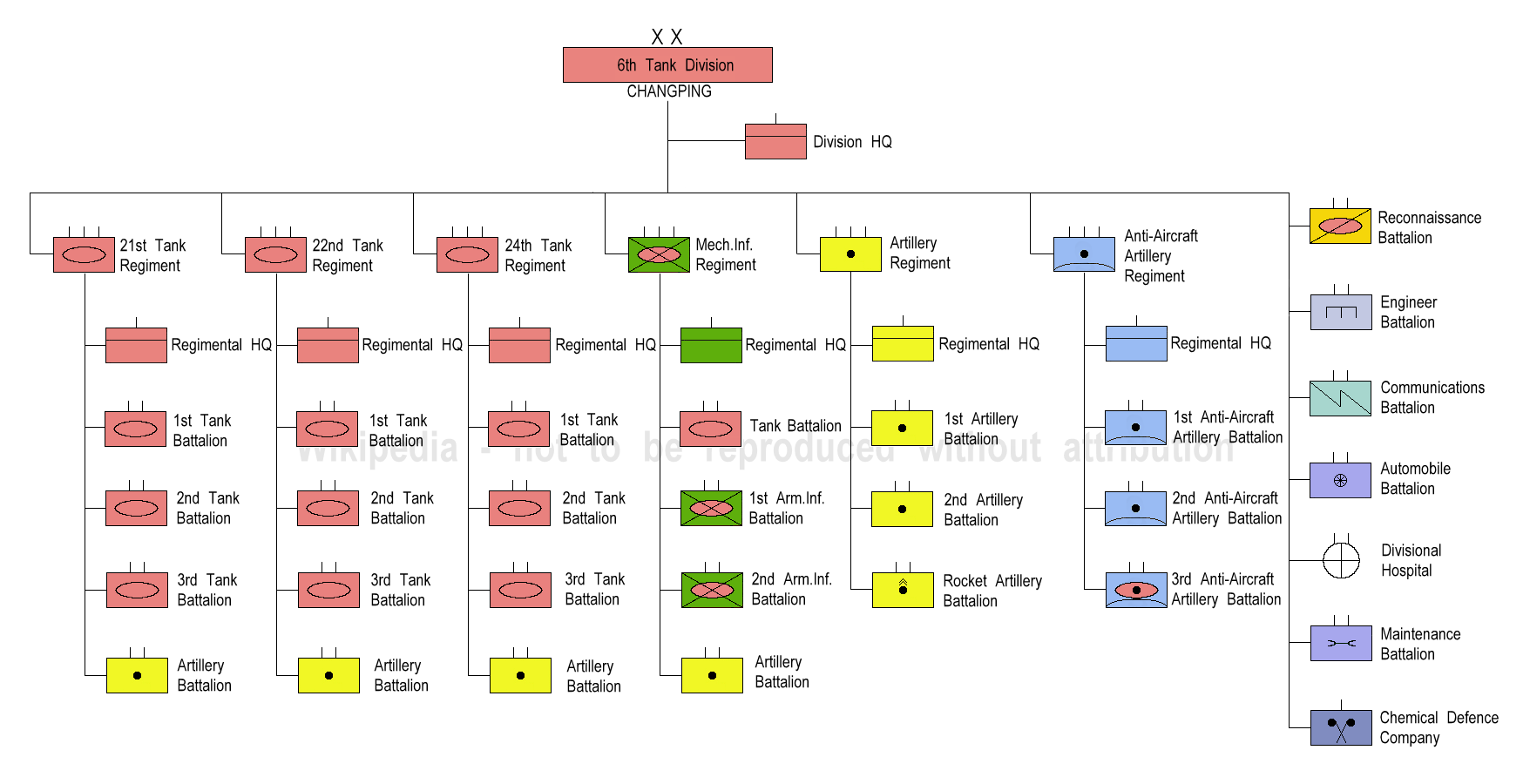
6th Tank Division, Organization 1984–98, as a Combined Arms Army Tank Division.

- 21st Tank Regiment;
- 22nd Tank Regiment;
- 24th Tank Regiment;
- Mechanized Infantry Regiment;
- Artillery Regiment;
- Antiaircraft Artillery Regiment.

In 1989 the division actively took part in the enforced martial law and the crackdown on protests in Beijing along with the other units from 38th Army.

In the early 1990s the division re-equipped with Type-88B main battle tanks.

In 1998 the division was renamed 6th Armored Division (Chinese: 装甲第6师). The Mechanized Infantry Regiment was disbanded and absorbed into tank regiments which became armored regiments.

The division was not affected in the 2011 disbandment of armored divisions. It was the only one armored division in the PLA Ground Force from the year of 2011 to 2017.

Since then the division was composed of:

- 21st Armored Regiment;
- 22nd Armored Regiment;
- 24th Armored Regiment;
- Artillery Regiment;
- Antiaircraft Regiment.

In April 2017 the division was split into two brigades: the 6th Heavy Combined Arms Brigade (Chinese: 重型合成第6旅) and the 189th Medium Combined Arms Brigade (Chinese: 中型合成第189旅).

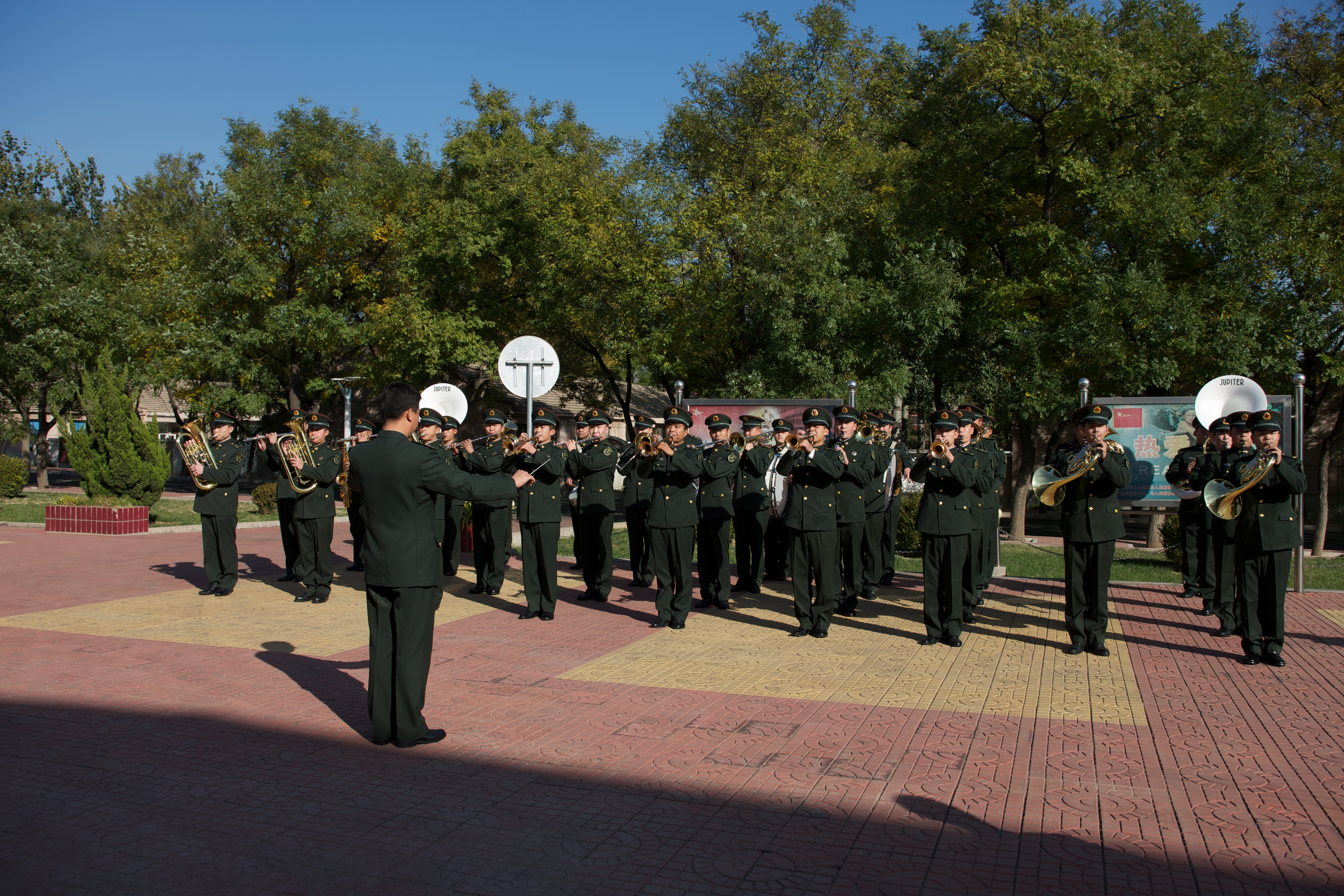
The divisional band during a performance in October 2012.

The 6th Armored Division Band (Chinese: 国防大学女子军乐队) is a Chinese amateur post military band that represents the 6th Heavy Combined Arms Brigade at official ceremonies. It is composed of non-professional musicians who volunteer to provide musical duties accompaniment at the installation. In October 2012, the United States Army Band took part in a goodwill tour of China with the PLA Band titled Friendship and Cooperation Through Music, during which the TUSAB provided a masterclass on music to members of the 6th Armored Division Band.
