= 10th Armored Brigade (People's Republic of China) =

Brigade of the People's Liberation Army

10th Tank Division (1967–98) 10th Armored Division (1998–2011) 10th Armored Brigade (2011–2017) 10th Heavy Combined Arms Brigade (2017–)
- Country: China
- Type: Combined Arms, Amphibious Armour
- Part of: 72nd Group Army
- Garrison/HQ: Jurong, Jiangsu

The 10th Tank Division (Chinese: 坦克第10师) was formed in August 1967 with the 4th Independent Tank Regiment, 284th Tank Self-Propelled Artillery Regiment from the 79th Army Division and the 286th Tank Self-Propelled Artillery Regiment from the 81st Army Division.

As of August 28, 1969, the division was composed of:

- 37th Tank Regiment (former 4th Independent Tank Regiment);
- 38th Tank Regiment (former 284th Tank Self-Propelled Artillery Regiment);
- 39th Tank Regiment (former 286th Tank Self-Propelled Artillery Regiment).

In the 1970s the division maintained as a reduced tank division, which consisted of 2 amphibious tank regiments (37th and 38th, with Type-63 amphibious tank) and 1 light tank regiment (39th, with Type 62 light tank).

In December 1969 it moved to Jurong, Jiangsu province.

In early 1976 37th and 38th Tank Regiments detached and renamed as Tank Regiment, 1st Army Corps and Tank Regiment, 60th Army Corps; respectively. The 2nd and 3rd Independent Tank Regiments of Nanjing Military Region attached and renamed as the 37th and 38th Tank Regiments.

In 1982, Armored Infantry Regiment and Artillery Regiment were activated and attached to the division.

By then the division was composed of:

- 37th Tank Regiment
- 38th Tank Regiment
- 39th Tank Regiment
- Armored Infantry Regiment
- Artillery Regiment

From January 1 the division was under command of the 60th Army Corps.

In 1985 the division was transferred to 1st Army after the 60th Army Corps' disbandment.

- The 38th Tank Regiment was disbanded;
- Tank Regiment, 60th Army Corps was attached to the division and reconstituted as the new 38th Tank Regiment.

In 1998 the division was renamed as 10th Armored Division (Chinese: 装甲第10师). The Armored Infantry Regiment was disbanded and absorbed into tank regiments which became armored regiments.

By then the division was composed of:

- 37th Armored Regiment
- 38th Armored Regiment
- 39th Armored Regiment
- Artillery Regiment

Throughout its history, the division was an amphibious unit that may take part in the first-wave assault of Taiwan.

The division was the only armored division deployed south of Yangtze River, and its 37th Armored Regiment was the first Blue Force unit of PLA ground force.

In late 2011 the division was split into two: the division itself became the 10th Armored Brigade (Chinese: 装甲第10旅), while half of its battalions formed the 178th Mechanized Infantry Brigade.

After the 2017 reform, the brigade was re-organized as the 10th Heavy Combined Arms Brigade (Chinese: 重型合成第10旅).
