= 7th Mobile Detachment, 1st Mobile Contingent =

187th Division (1949–53) 187th Infantry Division (1953–60) 187th Army Division (1960–85) 187th Infantry Division (1985-96) 187th Armed Police Division (1996-2017) 7th Mobile Detachment, 1st Mobile Contingent(2017-)
- Active: September 1945 -
- Country: People's Republic of China
- Branch: People's Armed Police
- Type: Gendarmerie
- Role: Civil defense, Rapid reaction force
- Size: Detachment
- Garrison/HQ: Yuci, Jinzhong
- Engagements: Second Sino-Japanese War, Chinese Civil War, Korean War, Vietnam War, 2008 Tibetan unrest, July 2009 Ürümqi riots

The 7th Mobile Detachment, 1st Mobile Contingent is a Regiment-level Detachment of the People's Armed Police's 1st Mobile Contingent. It is stationed in Yuci district, Jinzhong.

== History ==
The 2nd Detachment of Jizhong Column, was formed in September 1945.

In January 1949, the detachment was renamed to the 187th Division (Chinese: 第187师) basing on the 7th Brigade, 3rd Column of the Jinchaji Military Region.

The division was part of 63rd Corps. Under the flag of 188th division it took part in several major battles in the Chinese Civil War.

In February 1951 the division entered Korea with the Corps HQ as a part of People's Volunteer Army. During its deployment in Korea it took part in the Fifth Phase Offensive and the Battle of Cheorwon, during which the division suffered heavy casualties but halted the UN offensive. During its deployment in Korea the division allegedly inflicted 9074 casualties to confronting UN forces.

In January 1953 393rd Tank Self-Propelled Artillery Regiment was formed and attached to the division.

In October 1953 the division returned from Korea and stationed at Xingtai, Hebei, becoming the 188th Infantry Division (Chinese: 步兵第188师) of the National Defense Force.

In 1960 the division was renamed as the 187h Army Division (Chinese: 陆军第187师). By then the division was composed of:

- 559th Infantry Regiment;
- 560th Infantry Regiment;
- 561st Infantry Regiment;
- 392nd Tank Self-Propelled Artillery Regiment;
- 567th Artillery Regiment.

In 1962 the division was designated as a "Northern" unit, Catalogue A in War-time Structure, making it a "big" division of 12457 personnel. the division was shortly moved to Fujian province for an emergency alert deployment.

In December 1966, following the outbreak of the Cultural Revolution, the division moved to Beijing and stationed in Xicheng district for security mission. The division HQ and its 560th Regiment moved into Zhongnanhai. In December the division returned to its barracks.

From January 27, 1968, to March 9, 1969, Anti-Aircraft Artillery Battalion of 187th Army Division, reinforced by Anti-Aircraft Artillery Battery of 1st Tank Regiment, 1st Tank Division and attaching to 9th Anti-Aircraft Artillery Division of the Air Force, entered North Vietnam for anti-aircraft missions in Lang Son area.

On September 6, 1968, 392nd Tank Self-Propelled Artillery Regiment was detached from the division and transferred to newly formed 6th Tank Division and became 22nd Tank Regiment in December 1969.

On August 24, 1969, soon after the Tielieketi incident, the division moved to Jining, Inner Mongolia for emergency alert deployment. On November 26 the division was relieved from its mission and handed its position to 69th Army Corps.

The division was not affected during the December 1969 army re-designation, except for its 567th Artillery Regiment was renamed as Artillery Regiment, 187th Army Division.

From January 14, 1976, to November 1982, the division maintained as a northern unit, catalogue B.

From November 1982 to 1985, the division maintained as a catalogue B division.

In 1985 the division was renamed as the 187th Infantry Division (Chinese: 步兵第187师). From 1985 to 1996 the division maintained as a northern infantry division, catalogue B. From 1985 to 1989 most its regiments were organized as training formations:

- 559th Infantry Regiment - infantry regiment, catalogue A;
- 560th Infantry Regiment - special troops training regiment;
- 561st Infantry Regiment - infantry training regiment;
- Artillery Regiment - artillery training regiment.

In 1989, 560th, 561st regiment were re-organized as infantry regiments, catalogue B. Artillery Regiment, 187th Infantry Division was reorganized as artillery regiment, infantry division catalogue B.

In 1996 the division was transferred to the People's Armed Police and renamed as the 187th Armed Police Division (Chinese: 武警第187师). It had the unit number 8650 and is stationed in Yuci.

- 559th Armed Police Regiment, stationed in Qi County, Jinzhong
- 560th Armed Police Regiment, stationed in Taiyuan
- 561st Armed Police Regiment, stationed in Yuci district, Jinzhong
- 705th Armed Police Regiment, stationed in Taigu district, Jinzhong

The division was deployed to provide security during the 2008 Tibetan unrest and July 2009 Ürümqi riots

After the 2017 reform, the division was reduced to a detachment (regiment-sized): the 7th Mobile Detachment (Chinese: 机动第7支队) under the PAP 1st Mobile Corps (Chinese: 武警第1机动总队).
