= 63rd Group Army =

63rd Corps (1949–60) 63rd Army Corps (1960–85) 63rd Army (1985–2003)
- Chinese: 第63集团军
- Active: 1949.1–2003 (inactive)
- Country: China
- Branch: People's Liberation Army Ground Force
- Part of: Beijing Military Region
- Garrison/HQ: Taiyuan, Shanxi
- Engagements: Chinese Civil War, Korean War, Vietnam War

Commanders
- Notable commanders: Yang Chengwu; Zheng Weishan

The 63rd Group Army (Chinese: 第63集团军), former 63rd Corps and 63rd Army Corps, was a military formation of China's People's Liberation Army that existed from 1949 to 2003.

== Chinese Civil War and Korean War ==
The 63rd Corps (Chinese: 第63军) was created in January 1949 under the Regulation of the Redesignations of All Organizations and Units of the Army, issued by Central Military Commission on 1 November 1948, basing on the 3rd Column of the Jinchaji Military Region. Its lineage could be traced to the Jizhong Column formed in 1945.

As of its formation, the Corps was composed of three divisions: 187th, 188th and 189th.

The Corps was a part of 19th Army Group. It took part in many battles, especially the Pingjin Campaign during the Chinese Civil War.

In May 1949, the Artillery Regiment, 63rd Corps activated. From February 1951 the regiment was renamed as 170th Artillery Regiment.

In February 1951 the Corps entered Korea with all its subordinated divisions as a part of the 19th Army Group, People's Volunteer Army. During its deployment in Korea, it took part in the Fifth Phase Offensive and the Battle of Cheorwon, during which the corps suffered heavy casualties but halted the UN offensive.

In October 1953 the corps returned from Korea and was stationed at Shijiazhuang, Hebei. During the same month Anti-Aircraft Artillery Regiment (85 mm) activated.

In 1954, the 170th Artillery Regiment detached from the Corps and transferred to 190th Infantry Division as 1st Howitzer Regiment, 1st Mechanized Division. In May Anti-Aircraft Artillery Regiment (85 mm) disbanded.

In November 1955, 170th Artillery Regiment and 88th Anti-Aircraft Artillery Regiment were re-activated.

== 63rd Army Corps ==
In April 1960 the corps was renamed as 63rd Army Corps (Chinese: 陆军第63军). By then the Corps was composed of:

- Corps Headquarter
- 170th Artillery Regiment
- 88th Anti-Aircraft Artillery Regiment
- 187th Army Division
  - 559th Infantry Regiment
  - 560th Infantry Regiment
  - 561st Infantry Regiment
  - 567th Artillery Regiment
  - 392nd Tank Self-Propelled Artillery Regiment
- 188th Army Division
  - 562nd Infantry Regiment
  - 563rd Infantry Regiment
  - 564th Infantry Regiment
  - 568th Artillery Regiment
  - 393rd Tank Self-Propelled Artillery Regiment
- 189th Army Division
  - 565th Infantry Regiment
  - 566th Infantry Regiment
  - 567th Infantry Regiment
  - 569th Artillery Regiment
  - 394th Tank Self-Propelled Artillery Regiment

In May 1966, 189th Army Division detached from the corps and transferred to Beijing Guard District, and 88th Anti-Aircraft Artillery Regiment was disbanded.

In December 1966, following the outbreak of the Cultural Revolution, the corps moved to Beijing and stationed in Xicheng district for a security mission. In December the corps returned to its barracks.

In December 1966, the 7th Engineer District of Beijing Military Region Engineer Troops was transferred to the 63rd Army Corps' control. In December 1968 the district returned to Beijing Military Region Engineer Troops' control.

From January 1967 to March 1969, anti-aircraft artillery detachments from the Army Corps, with a total of 1579 personnel, moved to North Vietnam to take part in the Vietnam War.

In January 1968, 6th Engineer District of Beijing Military Region Engineer Troops was transferred to the 63rd Army Corps' control. In December 1969 the district detached and attached to 69th Army Corps as 206th Army Division.

In October 1969, 186th Army Division was activated under the corps from 2nd Engineer District, Beijing Military Region Engineer Troops and later renamed as 189th Army Division in December. In December 1969, 170th Artillery Regiment was renamed as Artillery Regiment, 63rd Army Corps.

In November 1969, the corps moved to Taiyuan, Shanxi and stationed there until its disbandment.

In January 1976, the 1st Independent Tank Regiment of Beijing Military Region joined the army corps as Tank Regiment, 63rd Army Corps, and Anti-Aircraft Artillery Regiment, 63rd Army Corps was activated.

== 63rd Army ==
In September 1985, the Army Corps was renamed as 63rd Army (Chinese: 陆军第63集团军), and its structure was completely re-organized:

- 189th Army Division was disbanded; 4th Guard Division from the Beijing Guard District joined the army as the new 189th Infantry Division. The 189th was then classified as a northern motorized infantry division, category B.
- 187th and 188th Army Divisions were renamed as 187th and 188th Infantry Divisions, respectively. The 187th was classified as a northern infantry division, category B, while the 188th as a northern motorized infantry division, category A.
- Tank Brigade, 63rd Army was activated from the disbanding 189th Army division(2nd formation), tank regiment and several other detachments.
- Artillery Brigade, 63rd Army was activated from Artillery Regiment, 63rd Army Corps, HQ, 16th Artillery Division and several other detachments.
- Anti-Aircraft Artillery Brigade, 63rd Army was activated from 635th and 636th Anti-Aircraft Artillery Regiment from the disbanding 68th Anti-Aircraft Artillery Division.
- Engineer Regiment was activated.
- Communications Regiment was activated.

From then the army was composed of:

- Army Headquarter
- Engineer Regiment
- Communications Regiment
- 187th Infantry Division
  - 559th Infantry Regiment
  - 560th Infantry Regiment
  - 561st Infantry Regiment
  - Artillery Regiment
- 188th Infantry Division
  - 562nd Infantry Regiment
  - 563rd Infantry Regiment
  - 564th Infantry Regiment
  - Tank Regiment
  - Artillery Regiment
  - Anti-Aircraft Artillery Regiment
- 189th Infantry Division
  - 565th Infantry Regiment
  - 566th Infantry Regiment
  - 567th Infantry Regiment
  - Tank Regiment
  - Artillery Regiment
  - Anti-Aircraft Artillery Regiment
- Tank Brigade
- Artillery Brigade
- Anti-Aircraft Artillery Brigade

From 18 May 1989, the Army, along with its 187th and 188th division, took part in the enforced martial law and the crackdown on protests in Beijing with 10000 personnel and 676 vehicles.

On 4 June 1989, 2nd Lieutenant Liu Guogeng(Chinese: 刘国庚), Platoon Leader of 1st Platoon, 4th Company, Communication Regiment of 63rd Army, was killed by the protesters in Xidan, Beijing. After his death, his body was burnt and epitomized. He was posthumously awarded as "the Guard of the Republic".

After the crackdown, 187th Infantry Division returned to its barracks on 18 July 1989, while the main part of 188th Infantry Division remained in Beijing until October 1990.

In 1996 187th Infantry Division detached from the army and transferred to People's Armed Police's control as 187th Armed Police Mobile Division.

In 1998 189th Infantry Division was reduced to 189th Infantry Brigade. Tank Brigade, 63rd Army was disbanded, and 7th Tank Division was reduced and joined the army as Armored Brigade, 63rd Army. 82nd Motorized Infantry Brigade attached to the army from the disbanding 28th Army.

== Disbandment ==
In 2003, the 63rd Army was disbanded. 188th Infantry division was reduced to 188th Mechanized Infantry Brigade, and 189th Motorized Infantry Brigade was disbanded. All remaining parts of the army were transferred to 27th Army's control.

As of its disbandment, the army was composed of:

- Army Headquarter
- Engineer Regiment
- Communications Regiment
- 188th Infantry Division
  - 562nd Infantry Regiment
  - 563rd Infantry Regiment
  - Armored Regiment
  - Artillery Regiment
  - Anti-Aircraft Artillery Regiment
- 82nd Motorized Infantry Brigade
- 189th Motorized Infantry Brigade
- Armored Brigade
- Artillery Brigade
- Anti-Aircraft Artillery Brigade

== Notable Commanders ==
- Yang Chengwu, first commander of the Corps, general of the PLA.
- Zheng Weishan, lieutenant general of the PLA.
- Fu Chongbi, commander of the Corps during its deployment in Korea.
