= 7th Armored Brigade (People's Republic of China) =

Brigade of the People's Liberation Army

7th Tank Division (1968–1998) Armored Brigade, 63rd Army (1998–2003) Armored Brigade, 27th Army (2003–2011) 7th Armored Brigade (2011–2017) 7th Combined Arms Brigade (2017–)
- Active: 1968.9 -
- Country: People's Republic of China
- Type: Armoured cavalry
- Size: Brigade
- Part of: 81st Group Army
- Garrison/HQ: Datong, Shanxi (before 2017)

The 7th Tank Division (Chinese: 坦克第7师) was formed on September 10, 1968 from 2nd Independent Tank Regiment, 233rd Tank Self-Propelled Artillery Regiment from 28th Army Division, 312th Tank Self-Propelled Artillery Regiment from 107th Army Division and 398th Tank Self-Propelled Artillery Regiment from 193rd Army Division.

As of September 12, 1969, the division was composed of:

- 25th Tank Regiment (former 2nd Independent Tank Regiment);
- 26th Tank Regiment (former 233rd Tank Self-Propelled Artillery Regiment);
- 27th Tank Regiment (former 312th Tank Self-Propelled Artillery Regiment);
- 28th Tank Regiment (former 398th Tank Self-Propelled Artillery Regiment).

In April 1976 26th Tank Regiment was detached from the division and renamed Tank Regiment, 69th Army Corps. In March 1983, Armored Infantry Regiment and Artillery Regiment were activated.

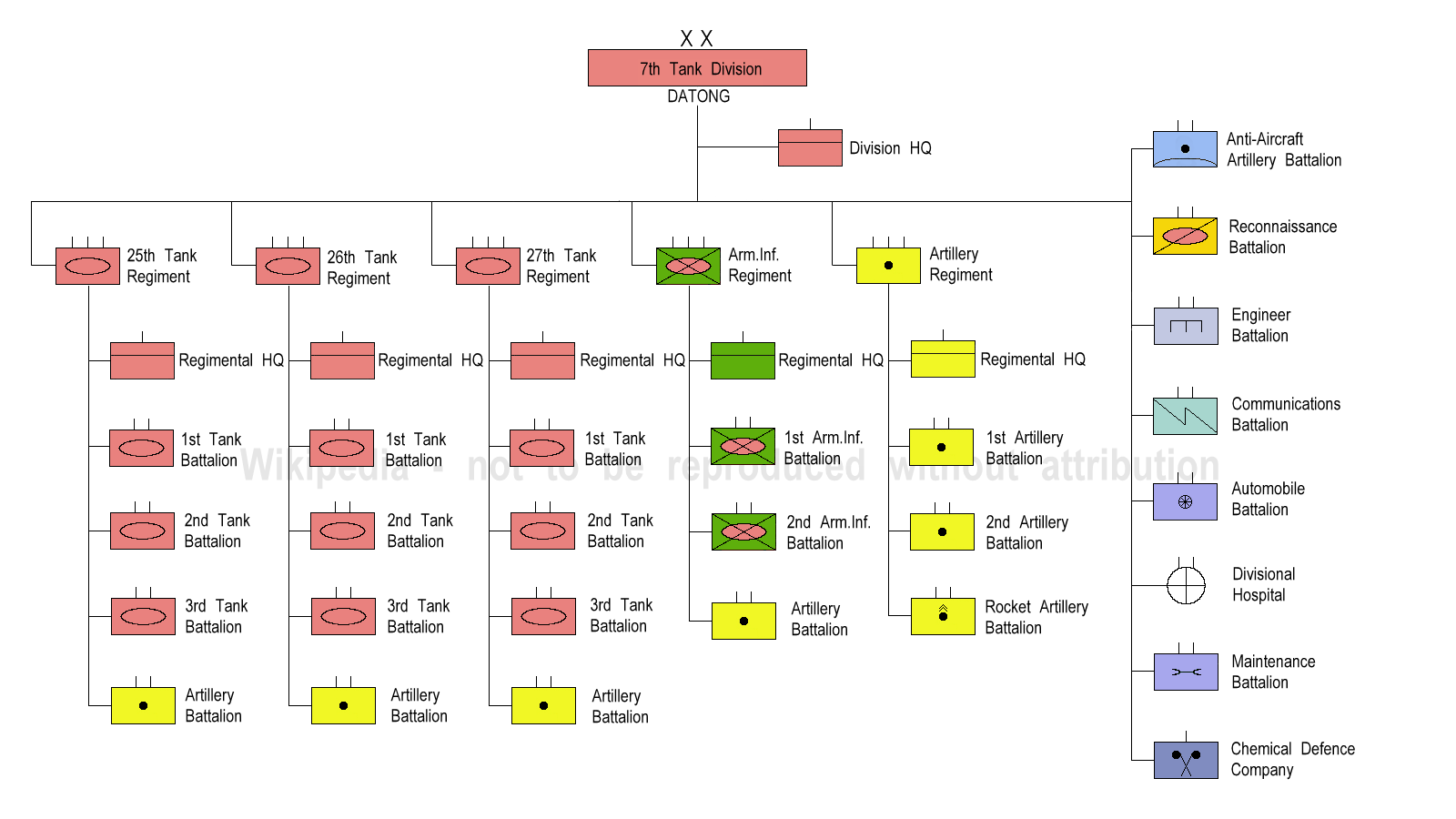
7th Tank Division, Organization 1984-1998

By then the division was composed of:

- 25th Tank Regiment;
- 27th Tank Regiment;
- 28th Tank Regiment;
- Armored Infantry Regiment;
- Artillery Regiment.

In 1970s and 1980s the division re-equipped with Type 69-1 medium tanks and became the only unit equipped with it. The division maintained as a tank division, catalogue B during the late-1970s and early-1980s.

In July 1985 the division was attached to 28th Army. In September 28 Tank Regiment was detached and renamed as Tank Regiment, 188th Infantry Division. Tank Regiment, 69th Army Corps returned and renamed 28th Tank Regiment.

In 1998 the division was transferred to 63rd Group Army after 28th Army's disbandment, and re-organized as Armored Brigade, 63rd Group Army (Chinese: 第63集团军装甲旅).

In 2003 it became Armored Brigade, 27th Group Army (Chinese: 第27集团军装甲旅) after 63rd's disbandment.

In late 2011 it received a new designation as 7th Armored Brigade (Chinese: 装甲第7旅).

In 2017 it was reorganized as the 7th Combined Arms Brigade (Chinese: 合成第7旅) and transferred to the 81st Group Army.
