= Chang Do-yong =

South Korean politician (1923–2012)

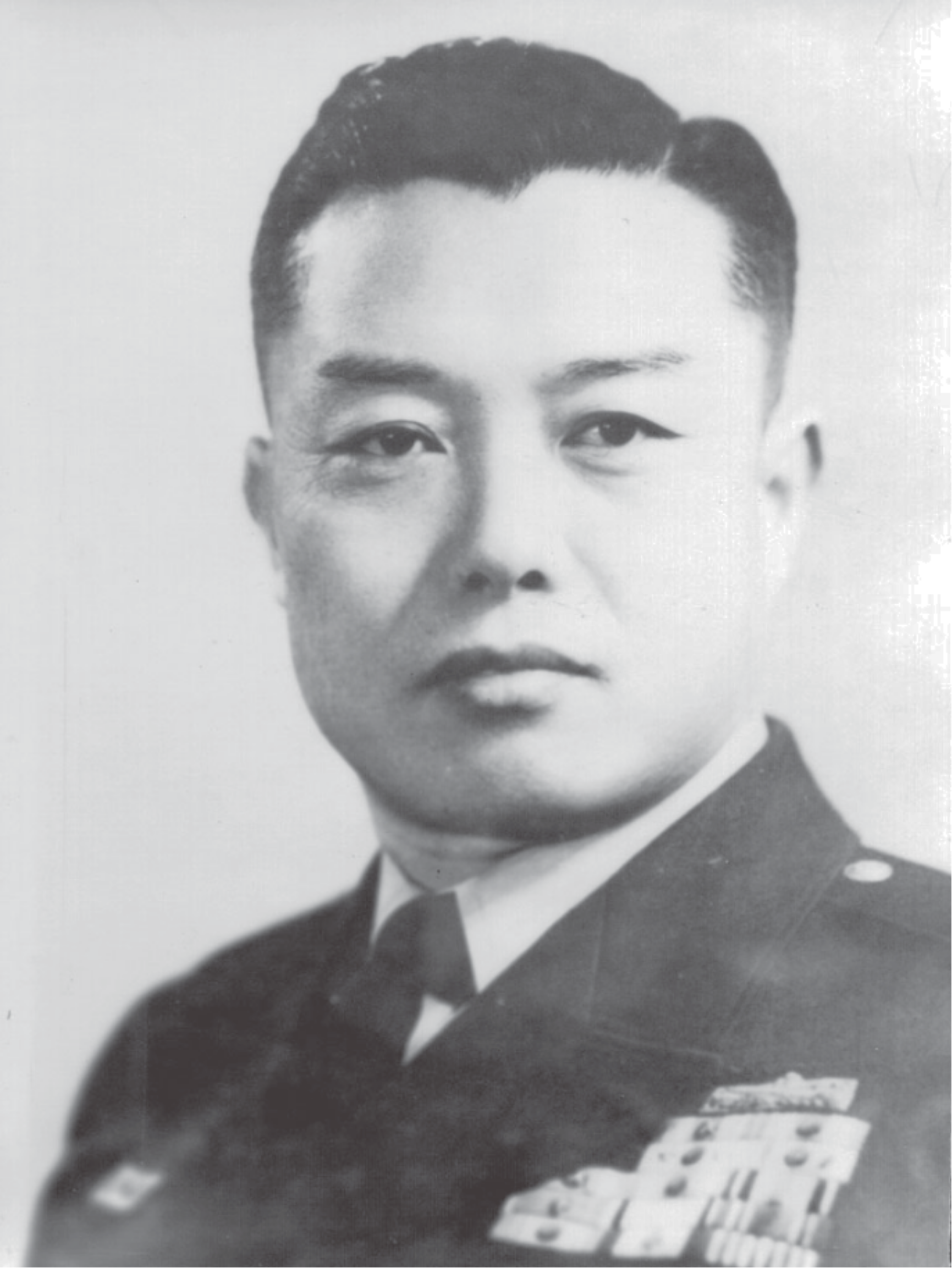

Chairman of the Supreme Council for National Reconstruction
- In office May 16, 1961 – July 3, 1961
- Deputy: Park Chung Hee
- Preceded by: Position established
- Succeeded by: Park Chung Hee

Acting Prime Minister of South Korea (Note: As 1st Chief Cabinet Minister of the Supreme Council for National Reconstruction.)
- In office May 20, 1961 – July 2, 1961
- President: Yun Po-sun
- Preceded by: Chang Myon (Note: As Prime Minister of South Korea.)
- Succeeded by: Song Yo-chan (acting)

11th Minister of National Defense
- In office May 20, 1961 – June 6, 1961
- President: Yun Po-sun
- Preceded by: Hyun Suk-ho
- Succeeded by: Shin Eung-gyun

Personal details
- Born: 23 January 1923 Ryūsen-gun, Heianhoku-dō, Korea, Empire of Japan
- Died: 3 August 2012 (aged 89) Orlando, Florida, U.S.
- Resting place: Seoul National Cemetery
- Party: None(military regime)
- Spouse: Baek Hyung-sook
- Children: 5 children
- Education: Imperial Japanese Army Academy; Korea Military Academy
- Religion: Protestantism

Military service
- Allegiance: Empire of Japan; South Korea
- Branch/service: Imperial Japanese Army (1944–1945); Republic of Korea Army (1945–8 August 1961)
- Years of service: 1944–1961
- Rank: Lieutenant(Japan); Lieutenant General(South Korea)
- Battles/wars: Second Sino-Japanese War; World War II; Korean War

Korean name
- Hangul: 장도영
- Hanja: 張都暎
- RR: Jang Doyeong
- MR: Chang Toyŏng

Chang Do-yong (Korean: 장도영; 23 January 1923 – 3 August 2012) was a South Korean general, politician and professor who, as the Army Chief of Staff, played a decisive role in the May 16 coup and was the first chairman of the interim Supreme Council for National Reconstruction for a short time until his imprisonment.

== Early life and education ==
Chang was born on 23 January 1923, in Ryūsen-gun, Heianhoku-dō, Korea, Empire of Japan. Chang attended Sinuiju High School(middle school). He graduated from the history department of Toyo University in 1944, planning to become a teacher, but instead attended and graduated from the Military Language School, the predecessor to the current Korea Military Academy.

== Career ==
=== World War Two and The Korean War ===
Chang initially served in the Imperial Japanese Army during the Japanese occupation of Korea, and retired from the Japanese army after liberation with the rank of lieutenant. He was then commissioned into the Republic of Korea Army. After serving as the commander of the 5th and 9th regiments, and as the head of the Army Counter Intelligence Corps, he commanded the 6th Infantry Division's forces, and during 1951 his forces were defeated by Chinese People's Volunteer Army (PVA) forces at the battles of Sachang-ni, Hwacheon-gun, and Gangwon Province during the initial stages of the Chinese spring offensive. However, his division quickly recovered and subsequently defeated PVA forces at the Battle of Paro Lake.

=== Involvement in the May 16 coup ===
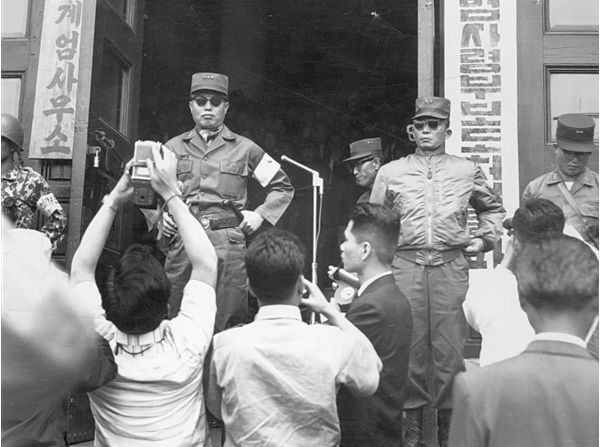
Chang Do-yong giving a speech 4 days after the coup on 20 May 1961. Park Chung Hee, then his deputy, is on the right side of the photo.

After the armistice, Chang became Army Chief of Staff at the age of 37 under the Cabinet of Chang Myon following the April 19 Revolution in 1960, but he was not loyal to his government. Chang first learned of the coup from Park Chung Hee on 10 April 1961, who wanted him to lead the new government so that the entire military would support it. He responded by neither joining the plotters nor notifying the government. This indecisiveness has been seen as giving legitimacy to the coup. In addition, Chang later convinced then-prime minister Chang Myon, that a security report containing leaked details of the coup (when it was scheduled to occur on 12 May) was unreliable. This allowed the planners to postpone it to 16 May.

=== Rise and decline ===
After the coup, Chang was appointed as a figurehead leader while Park held the real power. Soon afterwards, however, he formed a small faction of moderates, causing conflict with other more militarist officers, including Park. At his peak, Chang occupied four positions: chairman of the Supreme Council, prime minister, defense minister, and army chief of staff. Through May 1961, he attempted to gain recognition of the new government from the United States, meeting with John F. Kennedy on 24 May and promising a transfer to civilian control by 15 August (a priority for the US and president in name only Yun Posun, who Chang wanted to remain in office) on 31 May. These moves quickly made him unpopular with the rest of the military leaders, who saw him as a threat to their power and the goals of the coup. In June, after winning the acceptance of the US, Park and his followers turned the tide against Chang by implementing laws to restrict his influence. On 3 July 1961, Chang, the ten MPs posted around him for security, and 44 other officers were arrested on charges of conspiring to execute a countercoup. He surrendered without any resistance.

== Exile and later years ==
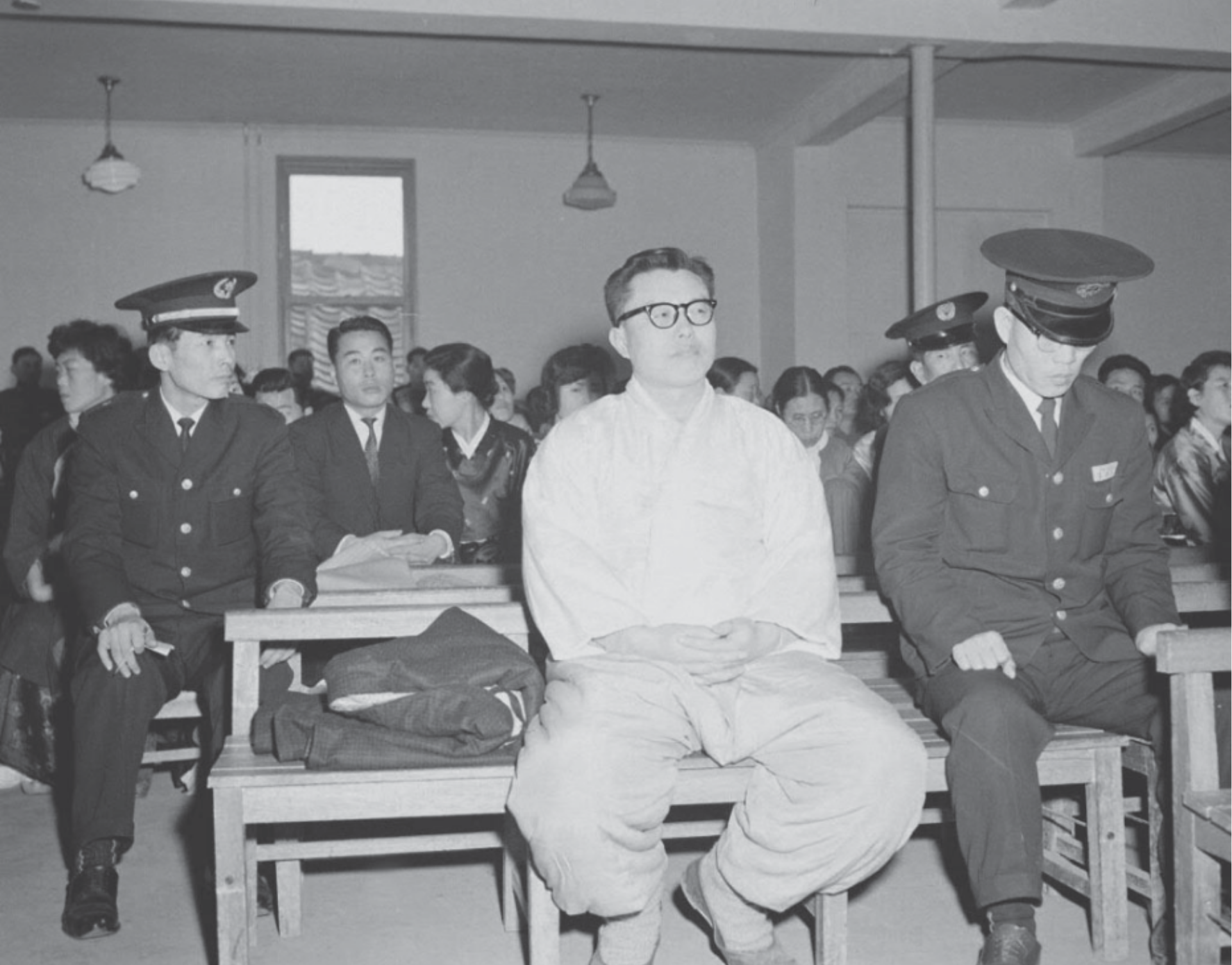
Chang sits in trial

Before his trial, Chang had already made it clear that he would flee to the United States, a move his persecutors didn't object to. In January 1962, he was sentenced to death for conspiring to obstruct Park's coup, a sentence which was later commuted to life in prison. In May 1962, Park pardoned Chang and allowed him to depart for the United States. There, Chang completed his doctorate in political science at the University of Michigan. Later, while teaching in the United States, he explained to an interviewer why he had been betrayed. In order to prevent Park's lust for power, he insisted on the transfer of power and explained that this was the case. The February 23, 1982 article from Korea JoongAng Daily, "Supreme Council for National Reconstruction, Issue 6" recalled, "Mr. Chang Do-yong recently recalled that he 'tried to set the period of military administration at six months,'" he recalled. "I thought our troops were well trained and would be able to restore order in 6 months. 'Let's hold elections in 6 months and create a new civilian government to raise the country. Leave this matter to me, without saying a word,'" he insisted to the Supreme Council. His subordinates did not listen to him.

The fact that Chang called for an early transfer of power is supported by various testimonies. But such claims are not the only cause of his disappearance. Chang claimed that he had visited South Korea in 1968 and met with Park as well as troops who participated in the Vietnam War. He joined Western Michigan University as an associate professor in 1971 and retired in 1993. By 2011, it was reported that he was suffering from dementia. He died on August 3, 2012, from complications of Parkinson's and Alzheimer's.

== Works ==
- Yearning for Home (《망향》. 서울: 숲속의 꿈), autobiography, 2001, ISBN 9788995007280

== Honors ==
- Taegeuk Class Order of Military Merit
- Silver Star Medal
