= 27th Group Army =

Former Chinese military unit (1949–2017)

- People's Liberation Army Flag of the People's Republic of China
- Active: 1949–2017
- Country: China
- Type: Group Army
- Size: Field Army
- Part of: Beijing Military Region
- Garrison/HQ: Shijiazhuang, Hebei
- Nickname: Unit No. 66267
- Engagements: World War II; Chinese Civil War; Korean War; Vietnam War; Sino-Vietnamese War

The 27th Group Army was a military formation of the People's Republic of China's People's Liberation Army and one of three active group armies belonging to the Beijing Military Region between 1949 and 2017. It was based in Shijiazhuang, Hebei. By 2013, the army included the 80th, 82nd, 188th, and 235th Mechanized Infantry Brigades, and the 7th Armored Brigade, plus the 12th Artillery and an AAA brigade.

== Chinese Civil War ==
The 27th Group Army traces its lineage to World War II as part of the 8th Route Army. Sometime following the end of the war the unit was reassigned, redesignated and reorganized as the 9th Column of the Eastern China Field Army. It was initially organized with the 5th and 6th Division and the 3rd Reserve Brigade. The unit was reorganized in March 1947 with the 25th, 26th and 27th Division. Following its reorganization the unit participated in the Shandong campaign. The unit also took part in the Battle of Wei County, where the 29th Regiment, 25th Division earned the title "Wei County Regiment" for the unit's gallant service. In September 1948, the unit took part in the battle for Jinan. The 9th Column then participated in the battle of Huaihai where it confronted and destroyed the KMT Huang Bo Tao Army Group.

In February 1949, the unit was redesignated and reorganized as the 27th Army. In 1949, the 27th Army was composed of the 79th, 80th, and 81st Divisions. It took part in the assault on Shanghai.

== Korean War ==
The 27th Army was part of the first contingent of Chinese forces to be deployed to Korea in October 1950 to fight against United Nations forces. It consisted of the 79th, 80th, 81st and 94th Divisions, though the 94th Division was attached to the 27th Army from its parent unit, the 30th Army. During the war, the 27th Army was commanded by Lieutenant General Nie Fengzhi. In 1950, the 27th and its officers were considered some of the very best within the PLA. During the war, roughly 80 percent of two "Hero Regiments" of the 27th were lost to disease. The 27th returned to China in 1952.

== Tiananmen Square ==
In June 1989, the 27th Group Army actively participated in suppressing the student demonstrations in Tiananmen Square and imposing martial law on Beijing. A declassified cable from the U.S. embassy in Beijing states that an unnamed Western military attaché alleged the 27th "was responsible for most of the death and destruction at Tiananmen Square on June 3." The same cable notes that the 27th was commanded by the nephew of CMC Vice-chairman Yang Shangkun, a known hardliner. The cable accused the 27th of killing "soldiers from other units run over by the 27th APCs and tanks" in addition to taking up position on a highway overpass and "poised for attack by other PLA units." Then-Secretary of State James Baker's morning summary for June 6 stated that China was seeing a "descent into chaos" as "according to press reports, elements of the 38th Army clashed with the 27th Army, which is being blamed for the worst atrocities against civilians during Saturday night's attack on Tiananmen Square" while "troops still entering Beijing are arriving without authorization and are intent upon attacking the 27th Army." The Secretary's morning report the following day refuted the previous day's reports of clashes between army units as "available evidence suggests that few — if any — significant engagements have occurred." The report stated that "some leaders may have envisioned an outcome that would blame most of the atrocities on the 27th Army, relieve its top commanders, and remove senior officials who ordered armed action against civilians." That same day an embassy cable alleged that, as the 27th was withdrawing from Beijing as part of a troop rotation, its soldiers had sealed off the Jianguomenwai diplomatic compound and fired above the rooftops of the apartments apparently in an attempt to flush out a sniper. The shooting damaged many buildings, including apartments housing foreign diplomatic officials. The cable states that an unnamed journalist explained that the withdrawal of the "much-hated" 27th and replacement its with the 20th Group Army was "intended to improve relations between the military and the residents of the city," though the cable states that this explanation is unconfirmed.
