= 189th Motorized Infantry Brigade =

Brigade of the People's Liberation Army

189th Division (1949–53) 189th Infantry Division (1953–60) 189th Army Division (1960–69) 4th Guard Division(1969-85) 189th Infantry Division (1985-98) 189th Motorized Infantry Brigade (1998-2003)
- Active: 1949.1 - 2003
- Country: People's Republic of China
- Branch: People's Liberation Army Ground Force, People's Volunteer Army
- Type: Motorized Infantry
- Size: Brigade
- Part of: 63rd Group Army
- Garrison/HQ: Linfen, Shanxi
- Engagements: Chinese Civil War, Korean War

The 189th Division (Chinese: 第189师) was created in January 1949 under the Regulation of the Redesignations of All Organizations and Units of the Army, issued by Central Military Commission on November 1, 1948, basing on the 9th Brigade, 3rd Column of the Jinchaji Military Region. Its history can be traced to the 5th Military Sub-district of Jinchaji Military Region, formed in March 1940.

== History ==
The division was part of the 63rd Corps. Under the flag of the 189th division, it took part in several major battles in the Chinese Civil War.

In February 1951 the division entered Korea with the Corps HQ as a part of People's Volunteer Army. During its deployment in Korea, it took part in the Fifth Phase Offensive and the Battle of Cheorwon, during which the division suffered heavy casualties but halted the UN offensive.

In January 1953 394th Tank Self-Propelled Artillery Regiment was formed and attached to the division.

In October 1953 the division returned from Korea and stationed at Huolu, Hebei, becoming the 189th Infantry Division (Chinese: 步兵第189师) of the National Defense Force.

In 1960 the division was renamed as the 189th Army Division (Chinese: 陆军第189师). By then the division was composed of a division HQ and the following:

- 565th Infantry Regiment
- 566th Infantry Regiment
- 567th Infantry Regiment
- 394th Tank Self-Propelled Artillery Regiment
- 569th Artillery Regiment

In 1962 the division was designated as a "Northern" unit, Catalogue A in War-time Structure, making it a "big" division of 12457 personnel. the division was shortly moved to Fujian province for an emergency alert deployment.

In May 1966 the division moved to Fengtai, Beijing and joined Beijing Capital District while detaching from the 63rd Army Corps.

In December 1969 the division was renamed as the 4th Guards Division (Chinese: 警卫第4师). All its regiments were re-designated as follows:

- 10th Guards Regiment (former 565th Infantry Regiment);
- 11th Guards Regiment (former 566th Infantry Regiment);
- 12th Guards Regiment (former 567th Infantry Regiment);
- Armor Regiment (former 394th Tank Self-Propelled Artillery Regiment);
- Artillery Regiment (former 569th Artillery Regiment).

In October 1976 the division was re-organized as a Motorized Army Division, and an Antiaircraft Artillery Regiment was formed and attached.

In January 1979, the 10th, 11th, and 12th Guard Regiments were renamed as the 14th, 15th, and 16th Guard Regiments, respectively.

In September 1985 the division was detached from the guard district and re-attached to the now 63rd Army. At the same time, it renamed as the 189th Infantry Division (Chinese: 步兵第189师), and all its regiments were re-designated as follows:

- 565th Infantry Regiment (former 14th Guard) - artillery training;
- 566th Infantry Regiment (former 15th Guard) - motorized infantry;
- 567th Infantry Regiment (former 16th Guard) - anti-aircraft artillery training;
- Tank Regiment;
- Artillery Regiment;
- Anti-aircraft Artillery Regiment.

From 1985 to 1998 the division was a Northern Motorized Infantry Division, Catalogue B, meaning all its infantry and tank regiments were composed of 2 instead of 3 maneuver battalions in peacetime.

From 1989 its 565th and 567th regiments became motorized infantry regiments, category B.

In 1998 the division was reduced and renamed as the 189th Motorized Infantry Brigade (Chinese: 摩托化步兵第189旅).

In 2003 the brigade was disbanded along with the Army.

This unit is not relevant to the 189th Medium Combined Arms Brigade, which was activated in April 2017.
