= 81st Armed Police Division =

3rd Security Brigade, Jiaodong Military regiment(1946-1949) 81st Division (1949–52) 81st Infantry Division (1952–60) 81st Army Division (1960–85) 81st Motorized Infantry Division (1985–96) 81st Armed Police Division (1996–2017)
- Active: September 3 1946 - present
- Country: People's Republic of China
- Branch: People's Armed Police
- Type: Gendarmerie
- Role: Civil defense, Rapid reaction force
- Size: Division
- Garrison/HQ: Hedong District, Tianjin
- Engagements: Chinese Civil War, Korean War, Vietnam War, Sino-Vietnamese War, Security during 2008 Beijing Olympics

The 81st Armed Police Division is a unit of China's People's Armed Police.

== History ==
The 3rd Security Brigade, Jiaodong Military District was founded in September 3 1946.

The Brigade was renamed to the 81st Division (Chinese: 第81师) was created in February 1949 basing on the 27th Division, 9th Column of Huadong Field Army.

In November 1950, Artillery Regiment, 81st Division was activated in Antung, Liaoning.

In October 1952, the division returned to China. Artillery Regiment, 81st Infantry Division detached and transferred to 24th Corps.

In February 1953, Tank Regiment, 81st Infantry Division was activated. On August 17 the regiment was renamed as 286th Tank Self-Propelled Artillery Regiment.

In April 1953, Artillery Regiment, 81st Infantry Division was reactivated in Shanghai. On August 17, the regiment was renamed as 361st Artillery Regiment.

From April 1954, the division was stationed in Zhenjiang, Jiangsu.

In April 1960, the division was renamed as the 81st Army Division (Chinese: 陆军第81师).

From June 1962, the maintained as southern army division, category B. By then the division was composed of:

- 241st Infantry Regiment;
- 242nd Infantry Regiment;
- 243rd Infantry Regiment;
- 361st Artillery Regiment;
- 286th Tank Self-Propelled Artillery Regiment.

In August 1967, 286th Tank Self-Propelled Artillery Regiment detached from the division to form 10th Tank Division.

In August 1969, the division moved to Handan, Hebei. From then the division maintained as northern army division, category A.

In August 1971, the division was reorganized as a motorized army division. Tank Regiment, 81st Army Division and AAA Regiment, 81st Army Division were activated. By then the division was composed of:

- 241st Infantry Regiment;
- 242nd Infantry Regiment;
- 243rd Infantry Regiment;
- Tank Regiment;
- Artillery Regiment;
- Anti-Aircraft Artillery Regiment.

In August 1985, the division was renamed as the 81st Motorized Infantry Division (Chinese: 摩托化步兵第81师) and reorganized as a motorized division, category B. 250th Infantry Regiment of the disbanding 84th Army Division was attached to the division. Tank Regiment, 81st Division detached to form Tank Brigade, 27th Army. Tank Regiment, 66th Army Corps was transferred to the division as the new Tank Regiment, 81st Division.

By then the division was composed of:

- 241st Infantry Regiment;
- 242nd Infantry Regiment;
- 243rd Infantry Regiment;
- 250th Infantry Regiment;
- Tank Regiment;
- Artillery Regiment;
- Anti-Aircraft Artillery Regiment.

In September 1989, the division was converted to a northern motorized division, category B. 250th Infantry Regiment was disbanded.

In September 1996, the division was transferred to the People's Armed Police and renamed as the 81st Armed Police Division (Chinese: 武警第81师) and was designated as unit 8630. It was headquartered in Tianjin:

- 241st, 242nd, and 243rd Infantry Regiments were converted to 241st, 242nd, and 243rd Armed Police Regiments, respectively;
- Tank Regiment, 81st Infantry Division was transferred to 27th Army's direct control as Former Tank Regiment, 81st Division. In September 1998 the regiment was disbanded.
- Artillery Regiment and Anti-Aircraft Artillery Regiment were merged into 702nd Armed Police Regiment.

The division was then composed of:

- 241st Armed Police Regiment - Hedong District, Tianjin;
- 242nd Armed Police Regiment - Cangzhou;
- 243rd Armed Police Regiment - Qing County, Cangzhou;
- 702nd Armed Police Regiment - Xiqing District, Tianjin.

The division was tasked with assisting with security during the 2008 Beijing Olympics.
