= Zhang Lingfu =

Chinese general of the National Revolutionary Army (1903–1947)

- 張靈甫
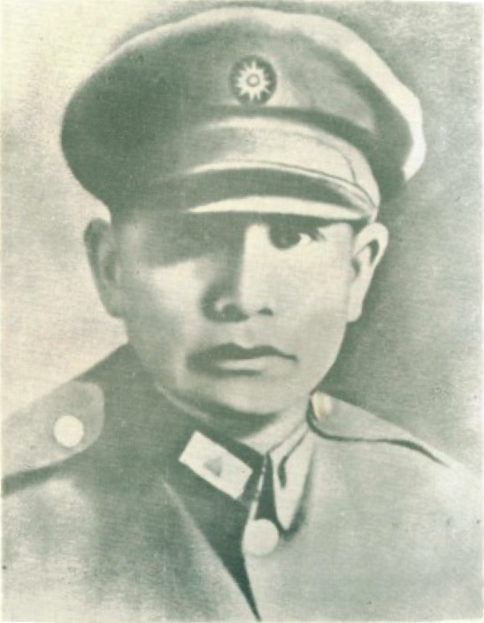
- Lieutenant General Zhang Lingfu
- Born: 20 August 1903; Xi'an, Shaanxi, Qing dynasty
- Died: 16 May 1947 (aged 43); Mengyin County, Shandong, Republic of China
- Military career
- Allegiance: Republic of China
- Service years: 1924–1947
- Rank: Lieutenant General
- Nickname: The lame legged general
- Units: 1st division, 1st corps
- Commands: 58th division, 74th corps
- Conflicts: Northern Expedition; Encirclement Campaigns; Second Sino-Japanese War; Battle of Wanjialing; Battle of Changsha (1939); Battle of Shanggao; Battle of Changde; Battle of West Hunan; Chinese Civil War; Battle of Huaiyin–Huai'an; Menglianggu Campaign
- Awards: Order of Precious Tripod

Zhang Lingfu (traditional Chinese: 張靈甫; simplified Chinese: 张灵甫; pinyin: Zhāng Língfǔ; August 20, 1903 – May 16, 1947) was a high-ranking general of the Chinese National Revolutionary Army. He successfully fought against the Communists and the Imperial Japanese Army. In 1947, his unit was surrounded by Chinese communist forces commanded by Field Marshal Chen Yi and General Su Yu. Zhang was unable to breakout from the communist encirclement because the relief efforts headed by his nationalist colleagues did not arrive in time, and he was killed in action in the Menglianggu Campaign on May 16, 1947.

== Early years ==
Zhang was born with the given name of Zhonglin (鐘麟) in a rural gentry family outside of Xi'an, the capital of Shaanxi province. He was a gifted calligrapher during his middle school days and was praised by his schoolmaster Yu Youren, a famous calligrapher and educator of the time. In 1924, he was admitted to Peking University as a history major. In 1924 he abandoned his studies and traveled with other young students to the south, joining the Whampoa Military Academy, some of his notable classmates included Du Yuming, Fan Hanjie, Li Mi, Qiu Qingquan, Hu Lien, Liu Yuzhang, Guan Linzheng and Lin Biao. As a member of the fourth graduating class of the academy, he joined the first corps of the National Revolutionary Army, Chiang Kai-shek served as the corps commander as well as commander-in-chief of the North Expedition. After the KMT-CCP split occurred, he stayed with the Chinese Nationalist Party and served at platoon, battalion, and regiment levels during the Anti-Communist Encirclement Campaigns against the Jiangxi Soviet under nationalist general Hu Zongnan. In 1936, he suspected his wife of having affairs, so he shot her dead in his home. Generalissimo Chiang Kai-shek sentenced him to ten years in prison.

== Second Sino-Japanese War ==
After serving in the prison for less than a year, the Second Sino-Japanese War broke out, his senior classmate Wang Yaowu successfully bailed him out of prison and appointed him as a regiment commander, Zhang participated the brutal street fighting in the Battle of Shanghai and Battle of Nanjing. In 1938 he was promoted to brigade commander, during the Battle of Wanjialing of the Wuhan theatre, he personally led a detachment that cut off the Japanese retreat route and ensured the final Chinese victory. In 1939 he was wounded in his left leg during the Battle of Nanchang. Although his doctor told after one more month of treatment his wounds could be healed, he returned to the army and participated in the Battle of Changsha. As a result, he was unable to recover from his injuries and his colleagues nicknamed him The lame legged general. Afterward, he was promoted to assistant division commander of the 51st division and deputy commander of 74th corps. In 1943, Zhang personally led a task force which relieved the besieged Chinese defenders in the ferocious Battle of Changde and forced the Imperial Japanese Army to retreat, and Chiang Kai-shek called him the model soldier. Although he failed to save General Fang Xianjue from the Japanese attacks during the Defense of Hengyang in 1944, his unit fought well and he tried his best, so the National War Council did not take any action against him. After this rather unhappy episode in his military career, his old superior officer Wang Yaowu helped him again by sending Zhang to the Army War College to study, and Zhang graduated with top grades. In May 1945, he fought under Wang Yaowu in the Battle of West Hunan and was decorated with Order of Precious Tripod and Medal of Freedom, and He Yingqin promoted him as commander of 74th corps.

== Chinese Civil War ==
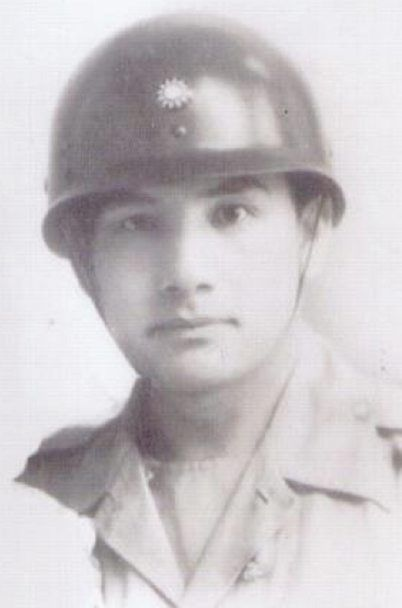
General Zhang in 1947

Soon after the Second Sino-Japanese War is concluded, the resumption of the Chinese Civil War occurred throughout most of the country. Chiang Kai-shek reorganized his American trained and equipped divisions into five elite units: Sun Li-jen's New First Army, Liao Yaoxiang's New 6th Army, Qiu Qingquan's Fifth Army, Hu Lien's 18th Army and Zhang's 74th corps. Like many of his own nationalist classmates, Zhang joined the early successful nationalist advance against the communist controlled areas, and scored a smashing victory in the Battle of Huaiyin–Huai'an in the August 1946 against the communists. In early 1947, Chiang shifted his strategy and launched attacks on Yenan and Shandong under nationalist general Hu Zongnan and commander-in-chief of the nationalist army general Gu Zhutong, Zhang's 74th division speared nationalist advance into Shandong province. Communist commanders Chen Yi and Su Yu avoid to battle the nationalists because they tightly concentrated their formation together, which rendered the communist guerrilla tactics useless. Tang Enbo ordered Zhang Lingfu's 74th independent enhanced division to advance further than their original goal, as a result he was trapped by 5 columns of communist troops, on May 12, 1947, Chiang ordered Huang Baitao's 25th corps, Li Tianxia's 83rd corps, Hu Lien's 11th independent enhanced division, Qiu Qingquan's 5th corps to save Zhang Lingfu from the communist encirclement. But Li Tianxia only sent a token force to help his beleaguered colleague because of jealousy, Huang Baitao did try his best but his relief efforts were beaten back despite being supported by tanks and air cover, Qiu Qingquan and Hu Lien were too far away from the actual battlefield to be much of help. The situation did not look good on the intelligence front either, when high-ranking communist moles in KMT department of defense, such as Guo Rugui and Liu Fei leaked vital military plans to the communist commanders. The difficult terrain in the mountainous areas also made Zhang unable to use his heavy weaponry; on the morning of May 16, 1947, Chiang issued another order on the pain of death to his commanders to save Zhang Lingfu and the 74th division, but none of the nationalist generals could make it in time. Zhang was killed in action in his cave hideout around 3:00 p.m. that same afternoon, although some sources cited that he committed suicide.

== Aftermath ==
Chiang Kai-shek lost one of his most able generals in the Menglianggu Campaign and his elite 74th independent enhanced division was wiped out from nationalist order of battle. Although the unit was rebuilt later on, but it never regained the former strength of the old 74th independent enhanced division, and was again destroyed in the Huaihai Campaign next year. Because of this disastrous defeat, Chiang responded by relieving Gu Zhutong as commander-in-chief of the army, Tang Enbo lost his position as commander of the first army, Li Tianxia was court-martialled and would not be holding any command position for the next two years, while Huang Baitao received a serious reprimand but was allowed to stay on as commander of the 25th corps. Chiang Kai-shek personally arranged a state funeral for Zhang after recovering his remains from the Communist forces, and renamed the Mengyin County of Shandong province in his honor, and a naval destroyer was also named in his honor.

== See also ==
- Battle of Huaiyin–Huai'an
- Menglianggu Campaign
