= China Wu Culture Expo Park =

Area of Wuxi, China

China Wu Culture Expo Park is located in Wuxi City, Jiangsu Province, China. In July 2008, the municipal CPC committee and the Government of Wuxi initiated this program. The park contains significant remains of Wu-Yue Culture as well as agricultural wetlands.

== Wu Culture and Locality ==
Short for the local culture of the Wu region, Wu Culture refers generally to all the outputs of material and spiritual civilization created in the Wu region in all ages.

In a narrow sense, the Wu region centers on the Lake Tai valley, including Nanjing, Yangzhou, Huaiyin, Shanghai and West Zhejiang Province. In a broad sense, however, it covers the Yangtze Delta, including developed cities: Wenzhou and Yongjia in Zhejiang, Shanghai, Nantong, Yangzhou, Zhenjiang, etc.

== Wuxi City and Yangtze Delta ==
Located at the river-lake corridor of the Yangtze Delta and in the southeast of Jiangsu Province, Wuxi City borders Suzhou on the east and is 128 km away from Shanghai; With Lake Tai on the south, it shares a boundary with Zhejiang Province; With Changzhou on the west, it is 183 km away from Nanjing; and with the Yangtze River on the north, it overlooks across the river Jingjiang City under jurisdiction of Taizhou City. Belonging to Jiangsu Province, Wuxi City has a total area of 4787.61km2 and a total population of 6.1 million.

A coordinate industrial system has been established in Wuxi, covering extensive fields focusing on textiles, electronics, machinery, chemicals and pharmaceuticals. As one of the 15 economic centers in China and an open city in the Yangtze Delta Coastal Economic Open Region, Wuxi has come to be a modern industrial city with large scale and high level in coastal area of China. In 2007, the GDP of this city ranked number nine and its urban comprehensive competitiveness number seven among the inland cities of this country. Meanwhile, Wuxi ranked third in "The Best Chinese Mainland Commercial Cities 2008" released by Forbes.

Wuxi National Hi-Tech Industrial Development Zone In June, 2008, Wuxi municipal party committee, municipal government decided to build Wu Expo Park of China. It is a crucial strategic decision to optimize industrial structure, to improve district function, and to promote cultural strength and comprehensive competitive strength of Wuxi on the level of the scientific concept of development. In Powerful Province Construction Conference of the year 2009, Jiangsu provincial party committee and provincial government listed China Wu Culture Expo Park as a key cultural park of Jiangsu.

In recent years, prominence has been given to harmony and innovation in Wuxi New District with a view to building an innovation-based international high-tech city, upgrading and transforming the social and economic development quickly, favorably and comprehensively. As a result, great achievements have been obtained in terms of social, economic, cultural and Party construction. The comprehensive power of this district takes a lead among 54 national high-tech development zones all over China. In 2008, Wuxi New District enjoyed a local GDP amounting to RMB 70.8 billion yuan, total financial revenue 14.38 billion yuan, local general budget revenue 6.1 billion yuan and total imports and exports USD 31.1 billion. The comprehensive economy equaled that of one of top 5 county-level powers in China. No.2 in science and technology innovative ability evaluation among National Hi-Tech Industrial Development Zones (National Science and Technology Department).

The functional area of China Wu Culture Expo Park covers 18km2 and so does its radiating area. Not only does it contain the abundant remains of the Wu-Yue Culture, but also the original agricultural wetland, so that it's a treasure land deserving protection and development. In combination of the history and the modern, the culture and the ecology, the economy and the community, this park integrates culture, ecology, amusement, tourism and industry, based on the Hongshan Grand Ruins and the agricultural wetland. Targeting the harmony between Man, Nature and Community, projects such as "China Wu Culture Theme Park" and "Lianghong Series" will be constructed on a high level.

Meanwhile, there will be "3 Zones, 2 Bases and 1 Platform" planned in this park, namely the zone of national Grade 5A Cultural, Ecological, Tourist Resort.

Industrial Structure

By following the strategy "Government Direction, Market Operation and Gradual Implementation", it is planned to establish five industries with revenues amounting to 1 billion yuan each in 2012: the cultural and tourist industry, the recreational industry, the business and holiday hospitality, the urban ecological agriculture and the cultural creation industry.

Overall Layout of Functional Zones

One Axis with Two Wings, Outlined as Bow-and-Arrow One Axis refers to recreational and creative experience; Two Wings refers to the Wu-Yue culture, tourism, amusement and resort. The program of One Axis with Two Wings is designed according to the spatial features of the site north-south which includes the original ruins, the creative cultural products, the recreational products and the vacationing products from the north to the south. In terms of "Bow and Arrow", the corridor of the Taibo Canal, the Wangyu River and the Cao Lake is the bow, the corridor of Huanhong Road is the string and the recreational & creative experience is the arrow. The water corridor and the land corridor in this program are of great importance, because the water corridor will be the best area for tourism and recreation in the future and the land corridor will be the first impression area in this program.

== Six Theme Functional Zones ==
Hongshan Ruins Protection Zone:

This zone includes the area planned to protect ancient tombs in the Hongshan Hill and the wetland in the north of this park and to the west of the Taibo Canal. Based on the grave complex of Kingdom Yue, this zone is designed to be a mature product of ruins tourism in the form of sight seeing and educational experience.

Lianghong Wetland Ecological Protection Zone:

In combination of ecological wetland, water culture and rural landscape, it integrates wetland eco-resources protection, scientific research, science display, artistic creation, tourism, recreation and vacationing, etc. It is planned to be made into the most famous cultural and ecological wetland around the metropolitan circle of the Yangtze Delta.

Wu Style Entertainment Zone:

South to Hongshan Ruins Protection Zone lies Wu Style Entertainment Zone. This zone contains the core functional project of China Wu Culture Expo Park — Wu Culture Theme Park, which integrates display, experience, pleasure, and movie and television base.

DaFangqiao Village Creative Industry Zone:

Covering approximately 300,000m2, it includes film and cartoon, digital recreation, publishing, architecture, advertisement, artwork and antique market, fashion clothing and products design. It will be constructed into an industrial base integrating creating, manufacturing and service as well as an artwork distributing center.

Hongshan Ecological Resorts Zone:

This area is to the south of Wu Style Entertainment Zone, the north of the Wangyu River and the south of Xinzhai Road.

Wu Style New Residential Zone:

To the south of Ximei Road, north of Hongshan Road and west of Huanhong Road, this zone is a real-estate development area. The buildings in the residential area are of traditional Chinese style, and also with HOPSCA project.

== Developing Stages ==
Start in 1 year, Complete in 3 years and Have Fame in 5 years 2008 is the year for planning of China Wu Culture Expo Park. In this year, the general plan for this park, the detailed plan for major functional zones and the design for some key functional projects would be finished.

2009 is the year for foundation construction of China Wu Culture Expo Park. In this year, municipal infrastructure construction of the major functional zones for China Wu Culture Expo Park and the foundation construction for key functional projects, such as Lianghong Wetland Park and China View Stone Park will be finished.

2010 is the year for construction of the core functional projects of China Wu Culture Expo Park. In this year, the core functional projects such as "Jiangnan in Prosperity– China Wu Culture Theme Park" and "Liang-Meng Hejia" will be finished; the major functional zones of China Wu Culture Expo Park will be shaped.

2011 is the year for promoting China Wu Culture Expo Park. In this year, the cultural tourism resources will be integrated on a high standard and the cultural tourism connotation of the Wu Culture Expo Park will be enriched and promoted.

2012 is the year for establishing the brand of China Wu Culture Expo Park.

By 2012, the investment in the infrastructure of China Wu Culture Expo Park will have reached 5 billion yuan and powerful industries will have been formed by attracting Chinese and foreign investment.

== Completed Projects ==
Hongshan Ruins Museum

Covering 7.5km2, Hongshan Grand Ruins is a grave complex of the Wu-Yue Culture dating back to Spring & Autumn and Warring States (770-221BC). Now, 108 mounds are known as large terraces in that time and 2300 cultural relics have been excavated from 7 graves. This Ruins was named as one of top ten archaeological discoveries 2004 in China. In 2006, it was included into "The 6th Batch Cultural Relics of National Importance under the Protection of the State" and 100 Key Grand Ruins under the State-Level Protection, 2006–2010.

Lianghong Wetland

Lianghong Wetland borders the Hongshan Ruins Park Agricultural Eco-Exhibition Zone to the east, the Taibo Canal to the west, the Zhan Bridge at Taibo Canal to the north and the natural village Qiaotou Lane to the south. The total planned area amounts to 1km2: Phase 1 covers 0.4 km2, which was completed at the end of March 2009. Phase 2 covers 0.6 km2, which will be completed in March 2010. The total investment reaches 500 million yuan.

== Projects under Implementation ==
China View Stone Park

Located at the north entrance of the principal function area, China View Stone Park borders the Taibo Canal to the north, Lianghong Wetland Park to the east and Hongshan Ruins Park to the south, covering 0.165 km2 as planned. Constructed by China Wu Culture Expo Park and the View Stone Association of China, this park has received great attention from the Torch High Technology Industry Development Center to the Ministry of Science and Technology of the People's Republic of China, the municipal CPC committee and Government of Wuxi. Covering 145,000 m^{2}, it is the first view stone park planned by the View Stone Association of China, which integrates science, appreciation, tourism, exhibition, sale, exchange, training, gardening, stone appreciation and the Wu Culture. Meanwhile, this park is designed to display two phylogenies – the Earth phylogeny and the stone culture phylogeny and build "4 zones and 1 avenue": Exchange Zone, Exhibition & Sale Zone, Popular Science Zone, Amusement Zone and China View Stone Avenue. Now, the plan and design for the park has been finished. On April 10, 2009, construction of this park started. The total investment amounts to 400 million yuan as estimated.

China Wu Culture Theme Park – A Large-sized Cultural and Tourist Complex

China Wu Culture Theme Park will be created as an engine for China Wu Culture Expo Park, presenting the factors "Wu Culture" and "Exposition" by means of three functions, namely Wu Culture exhibit, folk custom experience and modern amusement. Located at Wu Style Entertainment Zone, it is expected to cover 2-3km2 and cost 0.8-1 billion yuan.

Wuxi New District Radisson Hotel

Covering 100,000 m2, this Hotel is located in the north of the principal function area to the south is the Taibo Canal and to the east is Hongshan Agricultural Eco-Park. It is a five-star business and holiday hotel under the management of Carlson Group, featured by the classic style garden and business conference service. This villa will integrate food, beverage, lodging, conference, recreation, health and holiday.

8090 Wu Style New Country Yard

This area covers several original villages, with farm houses of traditional style in south China. The project includes dining, accommodation and entertaining.

State-Level Cultural Creative Industry Park

Located at Dafangqiao Village Creative Industry Zone, it covers approximately 300,000m2. This park aims at high-level industrial cluster in the type of cultural creative industry supported by high technology and includes film, television, cartoon, numeral recreation, publishing, architecture, advertisement, artwork and curio market, fashion clothing and product design, so as to be turned into an industrial base integrating creation, manufacturing and service as well as an artwork distributing center.

High-level Garden-style Resident Community

Located at Wu Style New Residential Zone, it has some 1.98km2 land available for development. To Hill Hongshan which boasts ecology and water resources, real estate developers will be introduced to develop international top communities with short-storey buildings and low concentration. It is expected to have waters run before every house and willows brush upon every roof.

Resort

Covering 240,000m2, the resort is located at Hongshan Ecological Resorts Zone.

College Town

Covering 0.2 km2, the College Town is located at Wu Style New Residential Zone, adjacent to China Wu Culture Theme Park.

R&D Base

Covering 300,000m2, the R&D Base is located between College City and Headquarters Park.

Other projects They include ancient commercial street, night-town (bar street), jade cultural park, health center and other tourist facilities.

== Operation Mode ==
Government Dominance, Market Operation Two bodies, namely Wuxi New District Wu Culture Expo Park Development & Construction Office, as a government organization, and Wuxi Wu Culture Expo Park Construction & Development Co., Ltd., as a market organization, will work together to push forward the development and construction of China Wu Culture Expo Park.

Government Sets up the Stage, Enterprises Put in the Show. As a state-controlled company, Wuxi Wu Culture Expo Park Construction & Development Co., Ltd. exercises the functions instead of Government to establish the Park, undertaking infrastructure and utilities construction, park greenery, development and construction of non-profiting facilities (including museum, wetland park, view stone park, etc.)
