= Sanshu =

Sanshū or Sanshu may refer to:

- Sanshu, Huai'an (三树镇), town in Huaiyin District, Huai'an, Jiangsu, China
- Yamashiro Province, or Sanshū (山州)
- Mikawa Province, or Sanshū (三州, 参州)
- Sanuki Province, or Sanshū (讃州)
