= Battle of Huaiyin–Huai'an =

1946 battle of the Chinese Civil War

Battle of Huaiyin-Huai'an
- Part of Chinese Civil War
Date	August 21, 1946 – September 22, 1946
Location	Huaiyin and Huai'an, Jiangsu, China
Result	Nationalist victory

Belligerents
Flag of the National Revolutionary Army National Revolutionary Army	PLA Chinese Red Army

Commanders and leaders
Chen Cheng; Zhang Lingfu	Chen Yi; Su Yu

Strength
110,000	80,000

Casualties and losses
14,000	Several thousand

The Battle of Huaiyin–Huai'an, also called by the Campaign to Defend Huaiyin-Huai'an (两淮保卫战) by the Chinese Communist Party, was a month-long battle between the Nationalists and the Communists during the Chinese Civil War for the control of Huaiyin and Huai'an, the two richest cities in China. Nationalist forces won the battle.

== Order of battle ==
- Nationalist order of battle
  - The 7th Army
  - Reorganized 26th Division
  - Reorganized 28th Division
  - Reorganized 69th Division
  - Reorganized 74th Division
- Communist order of battle
  - The 5th Brigade
  - The 13th Brigade
  - The 9th Column
  - Communist force from Shandong

== First stage ==
After the Battle of Si County, the Nationalists redeployed the Reorganized 74th Division and a brigade of the reorganized 26th Division to Huaibei from Huainan, and by the middle of August 1946, the Nationalists had taken regions including Chaoyang Village (Chao Yang Ji, 朝阳集) and Temple Mountain Yu (Miao Shan Yu, 庙山圩). On August 19, 1946, the Nationalist commander-in-chief of the region, Chen Cheng, held a military conference at Xuzhou, and decided the Nationalist strategy of the next stage: 4 Nationalist divisions under the command of the Nationalist commander Li Yannian (李延年) would push eastward across the Tianjin-Pukou Railway in Huaibei. On August 21, 1946, the Nationalists began their push toward Suining (睢宁), Xiuqian (宿迁), and Taier Village (Tai Er Zhuang, 台儿庄).

On August 26, 1946, Chen Yi telegraphed the Communist high command to report the three options for the Communist force from Shandong under his command to fight in Huaibei: First, the 2nd Division, 7th Division and the 8th Division of the Communist force in Shandong would attack the Nationalist 28th Army. Second, the Communist force in Shandong would regroup at Siyang (泗阳) and the eastern bank of the Grand Canal of China to have a month-long break. Third, all of the Communist force in Shandong would go south to join forces with the Communist force under Su Yu’s command to concentrate their forces. Chen Yi and his subordinates preferred the second option because they could strike in north, south or west when they wanted. The Communist high command telegraphed back on August 29, claiming that the Nationalists had struck eastward across the Lanzhou-Lianyungang Railway and thus threatened Huaiyin and Linyi, so it was impossible to for the Communist troops to rest for a month continuously. The Communists would be in a bad position if they were not to actively engaging the enemy.

The Communist force from Shandong under the command of Chen Yi was ordered to strike eastward to the Suining region and fight the enemy, then rest for a short period, and repeat the process, so that morale would remain high. September was considered a good time to engage the enemy. The Communist force under the command of Liu Bocheng and Deng Xiaoping and the Communist force under the command of Li Xiannian had all wished for Chen Yi's force to engage and tie down the Nationalists. If there was no battle, the Nationalists would gain more land, further boosting their morale, while Communist morale would suffer. Therefore, the Communists had to engage the enemy to decrease their morale and increase their own by annihilating a regiment or a brigade at a time. After five or six such engagements, the situation was expected to improve for the Communists.

In accordance with the order from the Communist high command, the Communist force from Shandong under the command of Chen Yi regrouped to the east of Suining in attempt to ambush the advancing Nationalists, however, their plan was foiled by the skillful and careful Nationalists who would not provide any opportunities for the enemy by concentrating their forces. Both sides subsequently had to cease their operations due to heavy rains that followed and by the end of August 1946, the Communist force from Shandong under the command of Chen Yi withdrew to the east of Siyang (泗阳) to regroup and re-supply. By the beginning of September 1946, the Nationalist Reorganized 69th Division and the Reorganized 74th Division stopped its advance at Xiuqian (宿迁) and Suining regions while two divisions of the Nationalist 7th Army stopped its advance at Oceanic River (Yang He, 洋河) and Ling River (Ling He, 凌河) regions to the north of Siyang (泗阳). Mother Nature had imposed an intermission that both sides were forced to accept.

== Second stage ==
The intermission caused by heavy rain had provided the opportunity for the Communists to rethink their strategy, but unfortunately, the new strategy formed lead to the eventual Communist defeat in the campaign. On September 4, 1946, Chen Yi provided three options for the next move for his Communist force in Shandong. The first option was to move to Shuyang (沭阳) in the north to face the incoming Nationalist Reorganized 74th Division and 69th Division thus securing the link to southern Shandong, but this would leave only the Communist 9th Column to defend Huaiyin, which was obviously not enough. The second option was to strike the town of Oceanic River (Yang He Zhen, 洋河镇) to fight the Nationalist force of the New Guangxi Clique, which would be at least two divisions strong, but this would not worth it. The third option was to wait, if the Nationalist forces of the New Guangxi Clique came to attack, then they would be ambushed, and if not, then the Communist forces from Shandong under Chen Yi's command would wait until Chiang Kai-shek’s force to begin their eastward push, and then strike north to fight Chiang's forces.

Su Yu and his political commissar Tan Zhenlin (谭震林) were concerned about the next move their comrades would make, and from September 5 to September 7, 1946, they had sent four telegraphs to Chen Yi, strongly recommending that his Communist force from Shandong should remain in Huaiyin and Shuyang (沭阳) regions so that the Communists could concentrate their forces to ensure victories. On September 7, 1946, Chen Yi personally reached Huai'an to discuss the situation with Deng Zihui (邓子恢) and Zhang Dingcheng (张鼎丞), the Communist party bosses in Jiangsu and central China, and reached the following conclusions: The Communists needed several victories badly and it was possible to achieve victories in Huaibei, so in September and October, Communist forces in Huaibei would attempt to alter the situation for the better. On the same day, the Communist force from Shandong under the command of Chen Yi received order to move to regions including Si (泗) County, Suqian (宿迁) and Shuyang (沭阳) to defend off the possible Nationalist attack on Shuyang (沭阳) from Suqian (宿迁), or the possible Nationalist attack on Huaiyin from the town of Oceanic River (Yang He Zhen, 洋河镇), and the troops began their new deployment on September 8, 1946.

Su Yu and Tan Zhenlin strongly opposed the new troop deployment by Chen Yi and on August 8, 1946, they sent two telegraphs to Chen Yi and his colleagues to voice their concern. The first was to ask not to take Hai’an (海安) so that their troops could have ten days to rest and regroup, and then move to Siyang (泗阳) to stop the Nationalist forces of New Guangxi Clique in order to stabilize the situation in central China. (Though in reality, the Nationalist forces of New Guangxi Clique did not participate in the fighting like the Communists had expected). The second telegraph sent by Su Yu and Tan Zhenlin to Chen Yi accurately pointed out the plan Chen Yi was ordered to follow was in fact a disaster because when the Communist forces were deployed in the regions between Suqian (宿迁) and Shuyang (沭阳), it would in fact allow the Nationalists easily taking the regions along the Grand Canal of China and Huaiyin-Huai'an region, thus forcing the Communist force from Shandong to return to where it was originally from. Meanwhile, the Communist force in Jiangsu lost their base, and were surrounded by the Nationalists from three sides, and thus forced to cross the Yangtze River into the south when supply run out. If Chen Yi still had to follow the order by deploying the majority of the troops in the north, then the Communist 2nd Column under commander Wei Guoqing (韦国清) must be retained in the region to check the Nationalist southward advance. Otherwise, Su Yu and Tan Zhenlin could not be responsible for the situation (when it turned for the worse).

The pleas from Su Yu and Tan Zhenlin were rejected by Chen Yi, who telegraphed back on August 9, 1946, claiming that the situation has changed and the Nationalist 7th Army had moved southward to regions including Lingbi (灵壁), Siyang, Suqian and Suining and its original defense perimeter was filled by other Nationalist units. The Communist should wait for several days to see if the Nationalists would move eastward, and if so, the Communists would ambush them in regions including Xin'an County, Shuyang and Suqian. Otherwise, the Communists would attack westward into the region of Suining and Suqian, so that the Communist position in Southern Shandong, Shuyang, Huaiyin and Huai'an would remain favorable, and Su Yu still should direct his force to take Hai’an. After receiving this telegraph from Chen Yi, Su Yu and Tan Zhenlin made one last attempt to avert Chen Yi's decision by telegraphing back on the same day, claiming that the situation for the Communists in Huaibei was not optimistic and both Huaiyin and Huai'an were threatened, so taking Hai’an should not be a priority, and their troops should be give up the mission and turn northward to defend Huaiyin and Huai'an. However, before they could exchange anymore telegraphs with Chen Yi, the rapid Nationalist advance had turned the table against the Communists, exactly as Su Yu and Tan Zhenlin had feared.

== Third Stage ==
The Nationalist assault was with lightning speed that was completely unexpected by the enemy: on August 10, 1946, the Nationalist Reorganized 28th Division and the Reorganized 74th Division struck the regions of the town of Oceanic River (Yang He Zhen, 洋河镇) and Storage Village (Cang Ji, 仓集) and threatened Huaiyin directly. Chen Yi was forced to readjust his troop deployment again: the Communist 5th Brigade and the 13th Brigade in central Jiangsu were ordered to Huaiyin to help the Communist 9th Column to set up a defensive line along the southern bank of the Grand Canal of China, the Communist forces attacking Hai’an (海安) abandoned their original plan and turned to Huaiyin to reinforce the threatened city. On September 12, 1946, the Nationalist 7th Army crossed the Grand Canal of China and took Siyang (泗阳), approaching Huaiyin. On September 13, 1946, the Nationalist Reorganized 74th Division attacked from the right flank of the Nationalist 7th Army, taking the Yuan Family's Village (Yuan Zhuang, 袁庄) and Xu Family's Village (Xu Zhuang, 徐庄) from the Communist 9th Column. Rao Zijian (饶子健), the deputy commander-in-chief of the Communist 9th Column personally led the Communist 75th Regiment counterattack, but without any success and the defenders’ perimeter was limited to the pier.

On September 15, 1946, the Nationalist Reorganized 74th Division attacked the pier on the eastern bank of the Grand Canal of China, and by the evening, had successfully driven the defenders consisted of the Communist 9th Column and the Communist 13th Brigade from the positions, taking the pier and adjacent Yang's Family's Village (Yang Zhuang, 杨庄). Pi Dingjun (皮定均), the Communist commander of the 13th Brigade, gravely underestimated the Nationalists when he reached Huaiyin with the 1st Regiment of the Communist 13th Brigade, and ordered each of three regiment of the 13th Brigade would have two of their battalions sent out to counterattack the Nationalists. The idea was strongly opposed by the Communist commander of the 2nd Regiment of the 13th Brigade, Zhong Fasheng (钟发生), who reached the city earlier and fought with the Nationalists and thus was well aware their adversary's potent capability. Zhong Fasheng claimed that the 1st Regiment reached the city by noon and was aware of the situation and geography while the 3rd Regiment just got to the city, so it would be better for the Communist 1st Regiment and the 2nd Regiment to fight and the 3rd Regiment would act as reserve, but his suggestion was rejected by Pi Dingjun. As a result, the Communist 13th Brigade launched a total of nine assaults on the Nationalist Reorganized 74th Division which had crossed the Grand Canal of China, but all were beaten back, suffering over 600 casualties, the heaviest ever for the 13th Brigade. A total of four Nationalist brigades from the Reorganized 74th Division and the Reorganized 28th Division attacked the city in two waves under the cover of air bombardment and artillery shelling, while the Communist reinforcements from Shandong were successfully checked by the Nationalist 7th Army. In the riverine region in the south, the Communist reinforcements were completely stopped due to the heavy rain and lack of boats.

The failure of the Communist counterattack meant that the defenders’ days were numbered when they were pushed to the edge of the city wall. Before the dawn of September 19, 1946, two companies of the Nationalist Reorganized 74th Division crawled to pass the defenders’ perimeter at the junction of the position of the Communist 9th Column and the position of the Communist the 5th Brigade, reached the gate of the city, and after capturing a sentry alive, they had successfully obtained the password. In the heat of ensuing battle, the two companies of the Nationalist troops were able to enter the city from the southern gate by disguising as the Communist troops outside the city wall going back into the city for re-supply. During the precise moment in the ensuing battle at the dusk, the Nationalists inside the city opened the gate and the defenders had no choice but to abandon the city as the attacking Nationalists entered the city en masse. On September 21, Communists abandoned Huai'an after fierce fights and on the next day, the Nationalists declared the city was secured. Although the Nationalists had suffered over 14,000 casualties in taking the region, it was an insignificant number and the reward was far greater. The Communist reinforcement from Shandong withdrew to Lianshui (涟水) region upon hearing the news of the fall of the cities, ending the battle.

== Outcome ==
The Nationalist victory resulted in a great blow to the morale of the enemy when Huaiyin, the capital of the Communist base in central Jiangsu was taken by the advancing Nationalists. Some Communists blamed the failure on the Communist leader Mao Zedong, for he had made the same mistake Chiang Kai-shek would make in the later in the Chinese Civil War by interfering with the local command with impractical strategic objectives, but this remains a subject of debate to this day: there were many Communist commanders that participated in this battle who insisted on Mao was right due to the following reasons: The loss of Huaiyin and Huai'an region, which was the economic center of central China where industrial and commerce were concentrated meant that the no more supplies could be provided to the Communist forces. Furthermore, all of the Communist bases in central and northern Jiangsu were lost as a consequence because the natural barriers that would help to defend these Communist bases such as Lake Hongze, Lake Gaoyou (Gao You Hu, 高邮湖), and Grand Canal of China were in Nationalist hands when Huaiyin – Huai'an region was lost by the Communists. The collapse of the Communist bases in northern and central Jiangsu as a consequence of the fall of Huaiyin – Huai'an region meant that the rural area as a rich source in grain production and providing soldiers was no longer within the Communist grasp.

On the other hand, many Communists also supported Su Yu for his decision to disengage the Nationalists and withdraw because although the consequences of giving up the region was severe, the Communist peasant infantry force at the time simply was no match for the elite mechanized Nationalist forces attacking them and certainly did not have any capacity to annihilate their Nationalist adversary either. If the region was to be held at all cost, the Communists might well have been completely annihilated. In fact, after the battle, the Nationalists were so confident that they no longer encrypted their messages in their radio communications so that their every move was known by their Communist enemy, yet the Communists chose to avoid direct confrontation with the Nationalists despite this advantage, because they were well aware that they were not strong enough at the time. To defend the city to the death just because the region was the heart and capital of the Communist base would be disastrous for the Communists. As the unexpected political fallout, this became an excuse to struggle and criticize Su Yu decades later during the Cultural Revolution what he had done in this battle.

== See also ==
- Outline of the Chinese Civil War
- National Revolutionary Army
- History of the People's Liberation Army
