= Nanma–Linqu Campaign =

1947 military campaign

Nanma-Linqu Campaign
- Part of the Chinese Civil War
Date	July 17, 1947 – July 29, 1947
Location	Shandong, China
Result	Nationalist victory

Belligerents
Flag of the National Revolutionary Army National Revolutionary Army	PLA People's Liberation Army

Commanders and leaders
(Republic of China (1912–1949)) Hu Lien (Republic of China (1912–1949)) Li Mi	Chen Yi; Su Yu

Strength
34,000	80,000

Casualties and losses
Communist claim : 13,800 killed or wounded 714 captured 14,514 total annihilated Nationalist claim : Reorganized 11th division in the battle of Nanma : more than 350 officers and approximately 4,000 soldiers casualties Reorganized 8th division in the battle of Linqu : 130 officers and 1,801 soldiers wounded 45 officers and 785 soldiers killed 7 officers and 235 soldiers missing Relief forces : Reorganized 25th division : 31 officers and more than 1,700 soldiers casualties Reorganized 64th division : more than 1,100 casualties Reorganized 9th division : 449 wounded and 225 killed	16,000 killed 500 captured Communist claim : 3,421 killed 15,985 wounded 2,180 other losses (missing, captured, and non-combat losses); 21,586 total Nationalist claim : Battle of Nanma : more than 20,000 casualties including at least 5,000 abandoned corpses Battle of Linqu : more than 30,000 killed or wounded including more than 5,000 abandoned corpses. 897 captured

The Nanma–Linqu Campaign consisted of two battles fought at Nanma and Linqu in Shandong between the communists and the nationalists during the Chinese Civil War in the post World War II era, and it resulted in a nationalist victory.

== Prelude ==
After the communist victory of the Southwestern Shandong Campaign in early July 1947, Zaozhuang, Yi City (Yi Cheng), Fei County, Dawenkou and Tai'an fell into the enemy hands, while Xuzhou was threatened, and the nationalists were forced to redeploy seven reorganized divisions for reinforcement since July 12, 1947 to reinforce southwestern Shandong. As a result of this redeployment, the nationalists only had four divisions in the mountainous regions in central Shandong. Taking this advantage, the communists hoped to take the nationalist strongholds of Nanma and Linqu and annihilating the nationalist defenders in the process, little did they know that they were gravely mistaken.

== Order of battle ==
Defenders: nationalist order of battle:

- The Reorganized 8th Division
- The Reorganized 11th Division
- The Reorganized 25th Division
- The 64th Division
- The Shandong 1st Security Division

Attackers: communist order of battle:

- The 2nd Column
- The 6th Column
- The 7th Column
- The 9th Column

== Campaign ==
On July 17, 1947, the advance guard of four enemy columns approached the town of Nanma and by the next day, all nationalist positions outside the city wall had fallen into enemy hands. The nationalist Reorganized 11th Division was forced to withdraw behind the city wall on July 18, 1947. Confident that the town would fall just as easily as the nationalist positions outside the city wall, the enemy advance guards unleashed their attacks on the town before the arrival of the main force. However, the bad weather the enemy had counted on turned against them by completely soaking the poorly equipped communist peasantry army, including their ammunition, while the flood caused by the heavy rain prevented the enemy reinforcements from arriving. Hu Lien, the defenders' brilliant nationalist commander who had badly mauled the enemy numerous times, was well aware that the isolated city would be attacked for certain and prior to the battle, had ordered the completion of a comprehensive fortifications within 20 days. These fortifications proved to be instrumental in defeating the attacking enemy. Meanwhile, the better equipped nationalists had mobilized the Reorganized 8th Division to reinforce Linqu from the north, and the Reorganized 25th Division and the 64th Division to reinforce Nanma from south. After three nights and four days of fierce fighting without the necessary equipment and thus any progress, and the nationalist reinforcement approaching fast, the enemy attacking Nanma was forced to withdraw when they learned that their main force could not make it in time.

On the other front, another battle was raging on in the region of Linqu . On July 23, 1947, the nationalist Reorganized 8th Division and the Shandong 1st Security Division took Linqu and camped behind the city wall to wait for the heavy rain to stop. The enemy planned to launch a surprise attack on the nationalists in the town under the cover of darkness and bad weather by concentrating a total of four communist columns. On the night of July 24, 1947, the communist 2nd Column reached the suburb of Linqu while the communist 9th Column managed to cut off the defenders' escape route by first taking Dragon Hill (Long Gang) and then Northern Pass (Bei Guan), wiping out two nationalist battalions in the process, and the town was thus besieged. On July 25, 1947, the communist 2nd Column attacked the town from the southwest while the communist 9th Column attacked the town from the northwest, and by July 26, 1947, a regiment of the communist 2nd Column managed to breach the defense at the city wall and penetrated into the town, and the defenders' morale begun to shake and many defenders begun to abandon their posts to flee. Realizing that failure was not an option, the nationalist general Li Mi had a fleeing battalion commander shot and he restored the morale and resolve of the defenders, who fought back with everything they had with Li Mi personally leading the charge, and successfully annihilating the enemy regiment inside the town and eliminating the defensive gap along the city wall, thus securing the defensive perimeter. Again, the bad weather the enemy had hoped to help them turned against them instead: only one of the two communist columns had reached the town and the other was stopped by the heavy rain and the flood it caused. Furthermore, the poorly equipped peasantry army was completely soaked once again, including their ammunitions. Lacking the necessary equipment and heavy weaponry needed to breach the fortifications along the city wall, the enemy nonetheless attempted yet another futile assault on the town on July 29, 1947, but again was beaten back. With the nationalist reinforcement approaching fast and no hope of taking the town, the enemy was forced to withdraw and the campaign ended with the nationalist victory.

== Outcome ==
The nationalist victory was a significant political and morale boost and had a profound impact on the nationalist tactics in the following engagements. In the earlier Menglianggu Campaign, the numerically and technically superior nationalist force was defeated by the numerically and technically inferior enemy out in the open, while in this campaign, the only advantage the nationalists had was technical superiority, and the numerically inferior defenders were able to thwart the numerically superior enemy's offensives with the help of the fortifications and the city wall. The result of the Nanma–Linqu Campaign obviously demonstrated clearly that such static defensive posture not only enabled the nationalists to defeat the enemy, but also enabled them to fulfill an uncompromising doctrine of Chiang Kai-shek: hold on the land they were defending. The tactic was therefore not only militarily practical, but also politically safe, and thus it was only natural for the nationalist commanders to adopt this tactic for the conflicts followed.

However, as the nationalists adopted the static defensive posture, it proved to be very effective against the communist peasantry army at the time, the success of the Nanma-Linqu Campaign became a victory that lead to disaster: the tactic required the defenders to concentrate their forces behind the city wall and the fortifications next to it, and thus the enemy were able to occupy and consolidate their positions in the vast rural regions within immunity. As the rural area fell into the enemy hands, the strongly defended urban regions became isolated and strangled when the supply lines were severed in sieges. The nationalist troops were still better off in the sieges because all available resources were devoted to combat troops, but the civilian populace would be starved and suffering. As a result, the very urban populace the nationalists attempted to protect inevitably turned against the nationalist troops, thus contributing to the eventual downfall of the nationalist regime. Militarily, this tactic would no longer work towards the end of the Chinese Civil War as the enemy begun to possess the necessary equipment to assault the cities / towns, but the tactic certainly worked at the time, and nobody had anticipated the rapid advance the enemy would make, and the enemy therefore unexpectedly gained in the long run from this defeat.

== See also ==
- Outline of the Chinese Civil War
- National Revolutionary Army
- History of the People's Liberation Army
