= Huaiyin–Huai'an campaign =

1945 military campaign

- Part of Chinese Civil War
Date	August 26, 1945 – September 22, 1945
Location	Jiangsu, China
Result	Communist victory

Belligerents
Flag of the National Revolutionary Army National Revolutionary Army	PLA Chinese Red Army

Commanders and leaders
Pan Ganchen; Wu Shuquan	Huang Kecheng

Strength
14,000	11,000

Casualties and losses
1,000+ 12,678 captured alive	200+

The Huaiyin–Huai'an campaign (两淮战役) was a campaign consisted of several battles fought between the nationalists and the communists during the Chinese Civil War in the immediate post-World War II era, and resulted in communists taking the city of Huaiyin and the city of Huai'an. Sometimes this campaign is separated into two by the communists as Huaiyin campaign (淮阴战役) and Huai'an campaign (淮安战役) respectively.

== Prelude ==
Like other similar clashes immediately after the end of World War II between the communists and the nationalists in China, this conflict also rooted from the fact that Chiang Kai-shek had realized that his nationalist regime simply had neither the sufficient troops nor enough transportation assets to deploy his troops into the Japanese-occupied regions of China. Unwilling to let the communists who had already dominated most of the rural regions in China to further expand their territories by accepting the Japanese surrender and thus would consequently control the Japanese occupied regions, Chiang Kai-shek ordered the Japanese and their turncoat Chinese puppet regime not to surrender to the communists and kept their fighting capabilities to "maintain order" in the Japanese occupied regions, fighting off the communists as necessary, until the final arrivals and completion of the deployment of the nationalist troops. As a result, most members of the Japanese puppet regimes and their military forces rejoined the nationalists.

However, these former nationalists turned Japanese puppet regime forces were not from Chiang Kai-shek's own clique, but instead, they were mainly consisted of troops of warlords who were only nominally under the Chiang Kai-shek's before World War II, since they were nationalists in name only and mostly maintained their independence. These warlords were only interested in keeping their own power and defected to the Japanese side when Japanese invaders offered to let them keep their power in exchange for their collaborations. After World War II, these forces of former Japanese puppet regimes once again returned to the nationalist camp for the same reason they defected to the Japanese invaders. Obviously, it was difficult for Chiang to immediately get rid of these warlords for good as soon as they surrendered to Chiang and rejoined nationalists, because such move would alienate other factions within the nationalist ranks, and these former Japanese puppet regime's warlords could still help the nationalists to gain more territories by holding on to what was under their control until Chiang completed the deployment of his own troops to take over. Chiang Kai-shek's objective was to simultaneously solve the warlord problem that had plagued China for so long and the problem of the extermination of communism together, which proved to be an extremely fatal mistake for him and his nationalist regime later on, as shown in this conflict.

== Nationalist strategy ==
In accordance with his strategy to simultaneously solve the warlord problem that had plagued China for so long and the problem of the extermination of communism together, Chiang Kai-shek and his followers had hoped that these former Japanese puppet regime's warlords who rejoined the nationalists would be able to hold on to the regions long enough for Chiang to deploy his own troops by holding off communists. If the communists were victorious in such conflicts, however, the result would still benefit to Chiang and China because the power of these warlords would be reduced as their military forces were smashed by the communists, and the warlord problem plagued China for so long could thus be greatly reduced, while at the same time, communists would be weakened by the fights and Chiang's own troops would have easier time to take control.

For the former nationalist turned Japanese puppet regime forces, these warlords and their troops had no problem of following Chiang Kai-shek's orders, and they were eager to prove themselves. These warlords and their troops were well aware that due to the collaboration with the Japanese invaders during the Second Sino-Japanese War, they were well hated by the general population in China, including those nationalists who refused to surrender to the enemy and fought the enemy until the eventual victory. Therefore, in the impending demilitarization after World War II, they would certainly be disarmed and discharged, which would probably be the best outcome and the power of these warlord would be reduced or even eliminated as a result. Chiang Kai-shek's ordering them not surrendering to the communists and fighting off the communists was a savior for them because by carrying out such orders, these warlords and their troops could legitimize themselves and thus retain their power by fighting the communists who were targeted as rebels by Chiang Kai-shek and his nationalist regime.

== Communist strategy ==
The communist strategy was much simpler than that of the nationalists because there was not any huge division within the communist rank like that of the nationalist. The communists already earned considerable popular support by being the only Chinese force left in the region fighting the Japanese invaders and their puppet regime after the nationalist withdrew, and after successfully establishing communist bases in the rural regions where better life was provided to the general populace in comparison to that of Japanese occupied regions, the general Chinese populace agreed that the communists were well deserved to represent the China to accept the invaders' surrender in the region and takeover the regions occupied by the invaders.

== Order of battle ==
- Defenders: nationalist order of battle (around 14,000 troops):
  - The 28th Division stationed at Huaiyin
  - Huaiyin Security Regiment stationed at Huaiyin
  - Three brigades stationed at Huai'an
- Attackers: communist order of battle (more than 11,000 troops):
  - The 3rd Division of the New Fourth Army
    - The 7th brigade
    - The 8th brigade
    - The 10th brigade
    - Sheyang (射阳) Independent regiment
    - Huai'an Independent regiment
    - Eastern Lianshui (Lian Dong, 涟东) Independent regiment
    - Huaiyin Garrison regiment
    - Lianshui (涟水) Garrison regiment

== First stage ==
The communist 10th brigade of the 3rd Division of the New Fourth Army begun its push toward Huaiyin on August 26, 1945, from regions of Gaoliang Ravine (Gaoliang Jian, 高良涧) and Jiang's Dam (Jiang Ba, 蒋坝), while five communist local regiments coordinated their attacks from other directions: the communist Sheyang (射阳) Independent regiment, Huaiyin Garrison regiment and Lianshui (涟水) Garrison regiment attacked Huaiyin from the east and north, while Huai'an was attacked by the communist Huai'an Independent regiment and the Eastern Lianshui (涟东) Independent regiment. After fierce battles that lasted four days from August 27, 1945 – August 31, 1945, all nationalist positions outside the city wall had fallen into the enemy hands and the city of Huaiyin was surrounded.

After besieging the city, the enemy force did not immediately attack, but instead, made preparations by building fire support stations and digging trenches that extended all the way to the foot of the city wall. The fire support stations were built by creating hills higher than the city wall with earth so that they would also serve as reconnaissance platforms and everything inside the city was under the attacking enemy's surveillance.

== Second stage ==
After the nationalist defenders refused to surrender, the final assault on the city begun in the afternoon on September 6, 1945, at 2:00 PM. Taking the advantage of the trenches, the attacking enemy succeeded in approaching the foot of the city wall and set explosives to blow up a section of the city wall near the eastern gate. The nationalist was unable to stop the enemy from rushing in from the collapsed section and after one and half hour fierce battle, the entire nationalist garrison of Huaiyin consisted of the 28th Division and the Huaiyin Security Regiment totaling more than 8,600 men were annihilated by the enemy. Pan Ganchen (潘干臣), the commander of the nationalist 28th Division was among the 300+ nationalist defenders killed, and another 8,328 was captured alive, included the chief-of-staff of the nationalist 28th Division, Liu Shaoshen (刘绍坤). The enemy also succeeded in capturing 7 artillery pieces, 88 machine guns, and 6,592 repeating rifles from the nationalist. The last resistance ended at 5:30 AM next day on September 7, 1945.

After the fall of Huaiyin, the communist 10th brigade of the 3rd Division of the New Fourth Army turned its attention to Huai'an, besieged the city on September 13, 1945. Two days later, on September 15, 1945, the commander of the communist 3rd Division of the New Fourth Army, Huang Kecheng (黄克诚) personally led the 7th brigade and the 8th brigade of the communist 3rd Division of the New Fourth Army to Huai'an, replacing the 10th brigade of the communist 3rd Division of the New Fourth Army in preparation to attack the city with the help of local communist militia. Realizing their desperate situation, the defenders attempted to breakout on the dusk on September 21, 1945, but was beaten back by the enemy.

The assault on Huai'an begun in the morning of September 22, 1945 at 8:00 am. Under the cover of heavy artillery support from mortars and infantry support guns which included captured Japanese Type 11, the attacking force succeeded in breaching the defense of the city, and the 12-metre-high (39 ft) city wall proved to be incapable of stopping the enemy, which was breached within 5 minutes. By 10:00 am, most of the defending force was annihilated. However, the remaining defense of a group of more than 200 ardent nationalists led by the nationalist brigade commander Wu Shuquan (吴漱泉) and the civilian commissioner Li Yunpei(李云霈) was much stronger than anticipated and it took attackers 5 hours to wipe out this last group of defenders and mop up the rest who went into hiding. The three-brigade strong nationalist defending force of Huai'an was completely annihilated by the attacking enemy with more than 300 killed, including the commander Wu Shuquan (吴漱泉), and another 4,350 men captured alive, while 5 artillery pieces, 52 light mortars, 50 machine guns and 3,738 repeating rifles also fell into the hands of the enemy. Along with the previous loss of Huaiyin and positions outside the two cities, the defenders lost nearly 14,000 troops, nearly the entire force.

== Outcome ==
Like other similar clashes immediately after the end of World War II between the communists and the nationalists in China, this conflict also showed that Chiang Kai-shek's attempt to simultaneously solve the warlord problem that had plagued China for so long and the problem of the extermination of communism together proved to be a fatal mistake. Although the result of the campaign turned out exactly like Chiang Kai-shek and his subordinates had predicted, and consequently the power of the warlords in this region was indeed reduced as their military forces were smashed by the communists, so that the warlord problem plagued China for so long was thus reduced for this particular region, and Chiang Kai-shek's secondary objective was achieved here, any positive gains obtained by the nationalists were negated by the politic fallout. The reason was that this success of achieving the secondary objective came at a huge cost in nationalists' loss of popular support in this region formerly dominated by the Japanese, because the local population had already blamed nationalists for losing the regions to the Japanese invaders, while reassigning these former Japanese puppet regime forces as the nationalist forces to fight the communists, the only Chinese force left in the regions, only further alienated the local populace and strengthened the popular resentment to Chiang Kai-shek and his nationalist regime.

In contrast, the communist victory of taking the two cities resulted in the linking up of the previous four separate communist bases in central Jiangsu, northern Jiangsu, north of Huai River and south of Huai River. The political fallout of Chiang Kai-shek's fatal mistake of attempting to simultaneously solve the warlord problem that had plagued China for so long and the problem of the extermination of communism together also greatly helped the communists in gaining popular support in the region.

== See also ==
- Outline of the Chinese Civil War
- National Revolutionary Army
- History of the People's Liberation Army
