= Liu Yuzhang =

Chinese general (1903–1981)

- 劉玉章
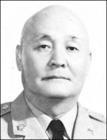
- General Liu Yuzhang
- Born: 11 November 1903; Xingping, Shaanxi
- Died: 11 April 1981 (aged 77); Taipei, Taiwan
- Military career
- Allegiance: Republic of China
- Branch: (Republic of China (1912–1949)) National Revolutionary Army
- Service years: 1925–1981
- Rank: General
- Nickname: Liu the Bald
- Unit: 2nd division
- Commands: 2nd Division (reorg.), March 1940; 52nd Army, 1948 deputy commander-in-chief, Shanghai Defense Command, November 1948–May 1949; Kinmen Defense Command May 1954–November 1957 deputy commander-in-chief, Republic of China Army, July 1957 deputy commander-in-chief, Taiwan Garrison Command, 1963–1967 commander-in-chief Taiwan Garrison Command, 1967–1970
- Conflicts: Northern Expedition; Central Plains War; Inner Mongolian Campaign; Defense of the Great Wall; Second Sino-Japanese War; Battle of Taierzhuang; Battle of Wuhan; Second Battle of Changsha; Chinese Civil War; Liaoshen Campaign; Shanghai Campaign; First Taiwan Strait Crisis
- Awards: Order of Blue Sky and White Sun
- Other work: author

Liu Yuzhang (traditional Chinese: 劉玉章; simplified Chinese: 刘玉章; pinyin: Liú Yùzhāng; 11 November 1903 – 11 April 1981), nicknamed the "Bald General", was a prominent Chinese (Kuomintang) general. He was one of the very few KMT commanders who could defeat both the Imperial Japanese Army and Communist PLA in the Second Sino-Japanese War and Chinese Civil War, respectively.

== Whampoa Military Academy ==
Liu enrolled in the fourth cadet class in 1925. Some of his well-known classmates included Lin Biao, Hu Lien, and Zhang Lingfu. After graduation, he participated in the Northern Expedition and Central Plains War and was promoted to the commander of the 5th Regiment, the 2nd Division when the Sino-Japan War began.

== Second Sino-Japanese War ==
In fact, Liu had already experienced fighting with Imperial Japanese Army in 1933, during the Defense of the Great Wall, in which he suffered a minor wound. After the war against Japan broke out in 1937, he distinguished himself in the Battle of Taierzhuang, Battle of Wuhan. In 1939, he was promoted to the brigade commander and also the garrison commander of Changsha and fought against Japanese forces in the First Battle of Changsha. In 1941, his commander Guan Linzheng promoted him to the post of the commander of the 2nd Division, the 52nd Army, while the corps stationed in Yunan. In 1945, he led the 2nd Division to Vietnam to accept the surrender of Japanese forces there. When Chinese communist forces invaded Manchuria, Liu's 52nd Army were sent to Manchuria to fight with the communist forces under his former classmate, Lin Biao.

== Chinese Civil War ==
=== Recovery of Shenyang ===
In September 1945, the Soviet Red Army of USSR occupied Shenyang. In March 1946, the Red Army withdrew from Shenyang and the KMT took over the city. Soon afterward, the PLA started large offensive operations against Shenyang. Liu was commander of KMT troops, and CPC's commander was Lin Biao, Liu's former classmate who had now become his enemy. Both men were fighting for the control of the city. Liu defeated Lin Biao's troops and won the battle, recovering Shenyang successfully at last, and after this victory Liu was promoted to lieutenant general. This battle was one of the early engagements in Manchuria where KMT had initial success.

=== Refusal to obey Chiang's order ===
When the Liaoshen Campaign broke out in September 1948, Liu's 52nd Army was part of the 9th Army Group. The 9th Army Group was tasked personally by Chiang Kai-shek to relieve the city of Jinzhou, and both 9th Army Group commander General Liao Yaoxiang and Liu knew that the city was a lost cause, so they suggested to President Chiang Kai-shek if the relief effort was not successful that the 9th Army Group should withdraw to Yinkou via sea. Chiang and nationalist overall commander in Manchuria, General Wei Lihuang agreed their proposal. But the 9th Army Group failed both objectives and on 26 October, the Communist Manchurian Field Army captured General Liao and took 100,000 nationalist soldiers as their prisoners.

=== Yingkou retreat ===
When the PLA won the Liaoshen Campaign, the KMT still had 50,000 troops near Yingkou port when the PLA began the final siege of the city. Liu's 52nd Army fought in rear guard actions to help those 50,000 men retreat to friendly territories such as Shanghai by sea.

On 31 October 1948 Liu boarded the last KMT naval ship to leave port when communist rocket and mortar fires fell on the beach. At this point he became extremely emotional and cried because he knew that KMT had lost the whole of Manchuria forever.

=== Trained in Command and General Staff College ===
Liu succeed his classmate Hu Lien as commander of Kinmen defense area and was sent to United States to study by Chiang Kai-shek. He was one of the few Chinese generals who graduated from an American military academy besides General Sun Li-jen. He was appointed as garrison commander of Taiwan and head of nationalist security police. Liu retired from the army in 1970 and died in 1981.

== Popular culture ==
In Taiwan, there are two war films about Liu Yuzhang and his units:

- 7-Man Army
- Da Mo Tian Lin (大摩天嶺): the background of this film was Liaoshen Campaign and Liu's troop had defeated Lin Biao in the hill of Da Mo Tian Lin.

Government offices
Preceded by Chen Ta-ching	The 9th Taiwan Garrison Command; 1967–1970	Succeeded by Ing Jun 尹俊
Preceded by Hu Lien	Commander of Kinmen Defense Area; 1954–1957	Succeeded by Hu Lien
