= Menglianggu =

Menglianggu is the name for a region in Mengyin County, Linyi, Shandong Province, belonging to the Meng Mountains in eastern China.

During the Song dynasty, General Meng Liang once stationed his army in this mountain. People later named the place after the general owing to his immense popularity. In the Chinese Civil War in mid-May 1947, the People's Liberation Army of the Chinese Communist Party cornered the National Revolutionary Army of Kuomintang in the region and won a smashing success in the Menglianggu campaign.

The Menglianggu Memorial of the Heros, a touristy attraction, situates in the mountain.
