= Menglianggu campaign =

1947 battle of the Chinese Civil War

- Part of the Chinese Civil War
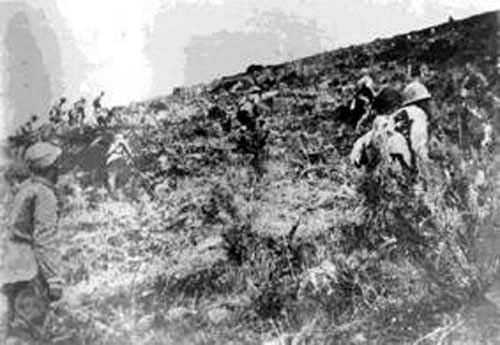
Date	13 May 1947 – 16 May 1947 (3 days)
Location	Mengyin County, Linyi, Shandong, China
Result	PLA victory

Belligerents
Kuomintang (Nationalist) (Republic of China (1912–1949)) Government of the Republic of China: (Republic of China (1912–1949)) National Revolutionary Army	Communist Party: People's Liberation Army

Commanders and leaders
(Republic of China (1912–1949)) Gu Zhutong (Republic of China (1912–1949)) Tang Enbo (Republic of China (1912–1949)) Zhang Lingfu † (Republic of China (1912–1949)) Huang Baitao (Republic of China (1912–1949)) Qiu Qingquan (Republic of China (1912–1949)) Hu Lien	(China) Su Yu (China) Chen Yi

Strength
600,000	200,000

Casualties and losses
14,000 killed 18,000 captured	3,500 killed 7,500 wounded

The Menglianggu campaign (Chinese: 孟良崮戰役) was fought between the nationalists and the communists during the Chinese Civil War in the post-World War II era. The battle resulted in the encirclement and destruction of the nationalist corps-sized 74th Reorganized Division, one of the most elite forces of their side, and a significant communist victory. The campaign was later used by the communists as a specific battle example in their military science and history. The battle mainly took place in Menglianggu of Linyi region in Shandong Province.

== Prelude ==
From March 1947 the Nationalists had abandoned their original plan of all-out assault on every communist position; instead, they adjusted their strategy to a much more realistic one: concentrating on attacking the communists in northern Shanxi and Shandong. In the Shandong theater of war, Generalissimo Chiang Kai-shek named Gu Zhutong, the commander-in-chief of the National Revolutionary Army, as the commander-in-chief at the front line, setting up his headquarters in Xuzhou. Gu Zhutong had 24 army-sized reorganized divisions totaling more than 60 division-sized reorganized brigades at his command, totaling 450,000+ troops. Out of that number, over 330,000 were in 17 army-sized reorganized divisions totaling more than 43 division-sized reorganized brigades, deployed on the first line, organized into three corps: the I, II and III. These were spearheaded by three crack units of the nationalist forces: the 11th Reorganized Division, the 74th Reorganized Division and the 5th Army. Out of the three corps, the I commanded by Tang Enbo was the largest and strongest, with almost 200,000 troops in eight army-sized reorganized divisions totaling more than 20 division-sized reorganized brigades; this unit was tasked with the main assaults on the communists. From late March to mid April 1947, nationalists succeeded in taking control of the regions along the section of the Jinpu railway from Xuzhou to Jinan and the entire southern Shandong region.

The overconfident nationalists subsequently attacked the mountainous region in central Shandong in late April 1947 but suffered a setback for their carelessness in Tai'an-Mengyin campaign, losing over 24,000 troops. However, such a setback was, in the overall scheme of things, considered a rather minor that could be ignored: a mere 5% out of the total force. The nationalists continued their original plan of pushing the arc-shaped front line continuously deeper into central Shandong and force the local communist force—the East China Field Army—into a decisive battle in which it would be annihilated; if the communists chose not to engage, then they would be forced to cross the Yellow River to flee north. The nationalist I Corps would attack toward the Yishui (沂水) and Tanbu (坦埠) regions, then join forces with the II and III corps to attack northward and eastward, destroying the communist base in Shandong. Five nationalist armies were deployed in the region border by the Qingdao–Jinan railway, Jinpu railway, and Tai'an in the south to support the three nationalist corps. Another two army-sized reorganized divisions were deployed in Yi (峄) County and Zaozhuang respectively as reserves.

== Order of battle ==
The nationalists totaled three corps with more than 600,000 troops, while the communists totaled 10 columns (armies) with almost 200,000 troops.

=== Nationalist order of battle ===
- The 5th Army
- The 7th Army
- The army-sized 11th Reorganized Division
- The army-sized 20th Reorganized Division
- The army-sized 25th Reorganized Division
- The army-sized 48th Reorganized Division
- The army-sized 65th Reorganized Division
- The army-sized 74th Reorganized Division
  - The division-sized 51st Reorganized Brigade
  - The division-sized 57th Reorganized Brigade
  - The division-sized 58th Reorganized Brigade
- The army-sized 83rd Reorganized Division
- Other various units

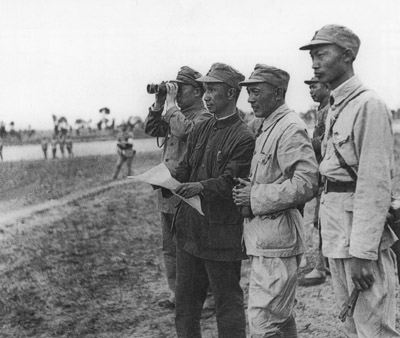
Communist commander Su Yu, second from left, surveying the battlefield before the Menglianggu Campaign in 1947.

=== Communist order of battle ===
- The 1st column (army) of the East China Field Army
- The 2nd column (army) of the East China Field Army
- The 3rd column (army) of the East China Field Army
- The 4th column (army) of the East China Field Army
- The 6th column (army) of the East China Field Army
- The 7th column (army) of the East China Field Army
- The 8th column (army) of the East China Field Army
- The 9th column (army) of the East China Field Army
- The 10th column (army) of the East China Field Army
- The specialized column (army) of the East China Field Army (unit with armor, trucks and artillery)
- Other local garrison units

== Commanders ==
Commanders from Nationalist side included:

- Supreme Commander: Generalissimo Chiang Kai-shek (Stationed in Nanjing)
  - Frontline Commander-in-chief: Gu Zhutong (Stationed in Xuzhou)
    - Corps Commander-in-chief: Tang Enbo
      - Hu Lien (胡琏): Commander of the 11th Reorganized Division
      - Huang Baitao (黄伯韬): Commander of the 25th Reorganized Division
      - Zhang Lingfu: Commander of the 74th Reorganized Division
      - Li Tianxia: Commander of the 83rd Reorganized Division (Replaced by Zhou Zhidao)

Commanders from Communist side included:

- Chen Yi (陈毅): Commander-in-chief and Commissar of the East China Field Army
  - Su Yu: Deputy Commander-in-chief of the East China Field Army, the actual architect of the campaign
  - Tan Zhenlin (谭震林): Deputy Commissar of the East China Field Army
    - Wang Bicheng (王必成): commander-in-chief of the 6th Column (army) of the East China Field Army

== Strategies ==
The strategies of both sides had changed from their original versions as the battles progressed.

=== Nationalist strategy ===
After the destruction of the entire 72nd Reorganized Division in late April 1947 in the Tai'an-Mengyin Campaign, the nationalists became very cautious and concentrated their forces in their movements afterward. On May 4, 1947, the communist high command radioed the East China Field Army that since it was impossible to fight large nationalist formations because the nationalists had concentrated their forces, the current tactic of waiting for an appropriate opportunity was to be maintained As long as they were patient, there would always be the opportunity to annihilate the enemy. Two days later the communist high command once again radioed the East China Field Army to instruct local communists on several important points: Never be impatient and never separate the concentrated forces, because as long as the concentrated force are ready to be mobilized, there would always be the opportunity to destroy the enemy. Local communist commanders redeployed their forces in early May 1947 by withdrawing their main force eastward to the region east of Laiwu and Xintai, while the communist 2nd and 7th Columns, originally planned to be deployed to central China, were instead withdrawn to Ju (莒) County, and the communist 6th Column was withdrawn to Pingyi (平邑) in southern Shandong. The communists were waiting to ambush the nationalists at the proper moment.

Nationalist commander Gen. Chiang Kai-shek had erroneously believed that the communist retreat was a sign of weakness and that they were no longer able to fight any decisive battles, so on May 10 he gave the order to pursue and eradicate them. Gen. Gu Zhutong subsequently ordered the three nationalist corps under his command to give chase toward Boshan and Yishui. Gen. Tang Enbo, the commander-in-chief of the nationalist I Corps at the right flank, abandoned the previously proven tactics of prudently pushing the enemy and acted on his own without coordinating with the II Corps and III Corps; he ordered the 74th Reorganized Division to advance toward Tanbu on May 11 from Tao Xu (桃墟) and Duo (垛) Village in an attempt to take control of the region along the highway from Yishui to Mengyin (蒙阴). To protect his flanks, he ordered the 7th Army and 48th Reorganized Division to advance toward Yishui in the north, and the nationalist 65th Reorganized Division to guard Mengyin. The resulting advance dangerously overexposed the nationalist units.

=== Communist strategy ===
On May 11 the communists learned that the nationalist 5th Army and 48th Reorganized Division had taken regions including Mia Family's Bent (Miao Jia Qu, 苗家曲) and Border Lake (Jie Hu, 界湖) by venturing out from Riverine Sunny and was advancing toward Yishui, leaving them dangerously exposed. The communists decided to ambush these units and, if possible, also any reinforcing units. After the order was given, new intelligence revealed Tang Enbo's plan and that the nationalist 74th Reorganized Division was advancing toward Tanbu. Communist commanders of the East China Field Army analyzed the situation and decided that it would be better to first annihilate the 74th Reorganized Division because it was the most dangerously exposed, and the gap between it and other nationalist units were the largest, making it easier to surround and destroy it. The commander of the nationalist 74th Reorganized Division, Gen. Zhang Lingfu, was regarded by many other nationalist commanders as arrogant because he was a favorite of Chiang Kai-shek and so was not on good terms with them, especially with Li Tianxia, the commander of the 83rd Reorganized Division. His relationship with his direct superior Tang Enbo was also quite rocky, so the communists believed that if Lingfu's 74th Reorganized Division was under attack, other nationalist commanders would not be too enthusiastic about saving it. The rugged terrain would limit the mobility of the mechanized nationalist force, while the communists could take advantage of it to hide and move their troops. The 74th Reorganized Division was one of the top five crack units of the nationalist forces, and once it was completely destroyed it would be a huge psychological blow to the nationalist morale and good propaganda for the communists. Another reason they had for destroying Lingfu's forces was personal: he had openly and often proclaimed that his goal was to feed Communist commander Chen Yi "to the fishes by driving he and his followers into the East China Sea. The communists were therefore determined to destroy their nemesis.

After the communists had changed their mind on their targets, the communists ordered a redeployment of their forces on the morning of May 12: they would concentrate at least five columns (armies) to destroy the 74th Reorganized Division in the region bordered by the Menglianggu (孟良崮) Mountains in the north and Tanbu in the south. Communist forces on their eastward march were ordered to immediately march in the opposite direction to the east of Mengyin. The Communist 1st, 4th, 6th, 8th, 9th and the Specialized Columns (armies) were assigned to attack the 74th Reorganized Division, while the communist 2nd, 3rd, 7th, 10th Columns (armies) and local militias were to prevent nationalist units, including the 5th and 7th Army and 11th, 25th, 48th, 65th and 83rd Reorganized Divisions from reinforcing the 74th Reorganized Division by blocking them in the regions of Xintai, Laiwu, Linyi, Lintai (临泰) and Riverine Sunny regions.

== 74th Reorganized Division besieged ==
On May 11 the 74th Reorganized Division begun its push northward from Duo Village under the cover of the 25th and 83rd Reorganized Divisions, and by May 13 it succeeded in taking regions including Yang Jia Zhai (杨家寨), Fo Shan Jiao (佛山角) and Ma Mu Chi (马牧池), and planned to take Tanbu on May 14. At dusk on May 13 the high command of the communist East China Field Army ordered the 1st Column and 8th Column to take advantage of the local terrain and penetrate deep behind the enemy lines to sever the links between the 74th Reorganized Division and other nationalist units nearby. On the evening of May 13 the communist 1st Column and 8th Column deployed a portion of their forces in front of the 74th Reorganized Division for blocking actions, while the main forces outflanked the 74th and penetrated into the nationalist line as planned. The 3rd Division of the communist 1st Column succeeded in taking Cao (曹) Village and the highland to the north of the village, threatened Mengyin and formed a defense position to block the nationalist 65th Reorganized Division from reinforcing the 74th Reorganized Division. The main force of the communist 1st Column succeeded in taking strategic positions including Mt. Huangdouding (黄斗顶山), Mt. Yao (尧), Mt. Tianma (天马山), and Mt. Jie Pai (界牌), severing the link between the nationalist 74th and 25th Reorganized Divisions. The nationalist 25th Reorganized Division attempted to break through but was forced to withdraw back to Peach Village to regroup after suffering heavy casualties. The communist 8th Column divided its force into two sections, with one section taking strategic positions including Mt. Heng (横山), Lao Maowo (老猫窝) to the southeast of Menglianggu mountains, while the main force took strategic positions including Mt. Tao Hua (桃花山), Mt. Bizi (鼻子山), and Mt Lei Shi (磊石山), thereby successfully severing the link between the nationalist 74th and 83rd Reorganized Divisions as planned. Meanwhile, the communist 4th and 9th Column attacked the nationalist 74th Reorganized Division head-on, successfully checking its advance by taking regions including Huanglu Zhai (黄鹿寨), Foshanjiao (佛山角), Mamu Chi (馬牧池), and Suijiadian (隋家店). The communist 6th Column, operating behind the enemy's line in southern Shandong, reached regions of Guanshang (观上) and Bai Bu (白埠) to the southwest of Duo Village from Tongshi (铜石) region on the morning of May 14 after a forced march.

Until the 74th Reorganized Division was first attacked by the enemy on the evening of May 13, it did not realize how grave the situation was going to be, and the nationalist commanders were still prepared to carry out their original plan of taking Tanbu on the next day. On May 12 Tang Enbo ordered Maj. Gen. Li Tianxia, the commander of the nationalist army-sized Reorganized 83rd Division, to send out a regiment to reinforce the 74th Reorganized Division, assessing the enemy's weakness while performing its mission. Li sent out the (brigade-sized) 57th Regiment of the (division-sized) Reorganized 19th Brigade of the Reorganized 83rd Division led by regimental commander Col. Luo Wenlang (罗文浪) to take Peach Blossom Mountain, 5 km to the southeast of Menglianggu. However, the nationalist reinforcements were ambushed, with the entire vanguard of the regiment being completely wiped out on May 12 battalion commander, Maj. Wang Shouheng (王寿衡), being killed in action. The next day the rest of the (brigade-sized) 57th Regiment of the (division-sized) Reorganized 19th Brigade of the Reorganized 83rd Division was wiped out after being cut off from the rear, and its commander Col. Luo Wenlang was captured. The failure to take Peach Blossom Mountain, 5 km to the southeast of Menglianggu meant that the link between the nationalist Reorganized 74th Division and its most probable reinforcements had been severed.

After nationalist commanders learned on May 14 that their strongholds including Celestial Horse Mountain, Horse Herding Pound and the Mountain of Heap of Rocks had fallen, they became aware that the enemy was planning to surround and destroy the 74th Reorganized Division, which subsequently retreated toward Menglianggu Mountains and Duo Village. The communists pursued them southward, with the 4th Column and 9th Column in the front, and after a night of battle they succeeded in taking the region along Tangjia Yuzi (唐家峪子) and Zhaojia Chengzi (赵家城子). At dawn of May 15 Duo Village, the last nationalist stronghold, had fallen to the 6th Column (with the help of the 1st Column). After fierce fighting in the Menglianggu and Lu (芦) Mountains, the communist 8th Column succeeded in taking Mt. Wanquan (万泉山), thus linking up with communist 1st Column and 6th Column. By the end of May 15 the communist 1st, 6th and 8th Columns had succeeded in achieving their objectives of completely cutting off the nationalist 74th Reorganized Division, which was now completely surrounded.

== Intentions revealed ==
Although surprised that its 74th Reorganized Division was surrounded, the nationalists were not scared; in fact, they were joyful at first because this could present the opportunity they had been waiting for: a decisive battle in which their enemy would be annihilated by the numerically and technically superior nationalists attacking from both sides. The 74th Reorganized Division would be in the center surrounded by the communists, while another nine army-sized reorganized divisions would surround them in another siege. The nationalists believed that the 74th Reorganized Division was tough enough to withstand assaults and hold on until the final nationalist counterattack, in which they would attack from both sides of the communist forces and annihilate them. The nationalist high command therefore ordered the 74th Reorganized Division to take its position in the Menglianggu mountains and wait for reinforcements. The main peak of Menglianggu mountains extended northwestward toward Mount 540, which consisted of the eastern and western halves, and at the extreme northwestern end there was Mount 520. The region named Diaowo (雕窝) was located in the east and Mount Lu was located in the southeast. The Wen (汶) River was to the north and Linyi – Mengfang (蒙防) Highway was located 4 km to the south. The mountain range was around 10 km in the east–west direction but there were no trees on it. There was not much grass, either, and water sources were nearly nonexistent. However, the nationalists believed these would not be a problem because reinforcements would arrive soon; little did they know that the development of battles in the latter stage of the campaign was totally different. To reinforce the besieged 74th Division, the nationalist high command ordered nearby units to rapidly close the distance between themselves and the Menglianggu mountains; these units included the 11th Reorganized Division from Xintai, the 65th Reorganized Division from Mengyin, the 25th Reorganized Division from at Peach Village, the 83rd Reorganized Division from at Qingtuo Temple (青驼寺), the 7th Army at He Yang (河阳), the 48th Reorganized Division from Tangtou (汤头) and the 5th Army from Laiwu. The 20th Reorganized Division from Dawenkou (大汶口) was ordered to go to Mengyin, while other nationalist units from the second line were also mobilized in the hope of annihilating the communists in a decisive campaign in the regions of Mengyin and Green Camel Temple regions.

After the failed attempt to breakout in the south, the nationalist 74th Reorganized Division withdrew to the Menglianggu mountains. The three regiments of the 58th Reorganized Brigade of the nationalist 74th Reorganized Division was tasked respectively to secure the main peak of the Menglianggu mountains, Eagle's Nest and Mount Lu. The 51st Reorganized Brigade of the nationalist 74th Reorganized Division was to secure Mount 520 and Mount 540, while the 57th Reorganized Brigade of the nationalist 74th Reorganized Division was to secure Mount 570 (also designated as Mount 600 in other historical records). Zhang Lingfu set up his headquarters of the nationalist 74th Reorganized Division was on the eastern half of Mount 540, and repeatedly asked the nationalist high command for reinforcements. Chiang Kai-shek believed that this was an excellent opportunity to annihilate the communist East China Field Army in a decisive campaign, so he ordered RoCAF to airdrop supplies to the besieged nationalists, and also ordered a total of ten army-sized nationalist reorganized divisions spearheaded by the 25th Reorganized Division and 83rd Reorganized Division to reinforce the besieged nationalists. As a result, the strategies of both sides became obvious to the opposing forces: the communists intended to destroy the besieged nationalist 74th Reorganized Division while avoiding being attacked and wiped out from both fronts, while the nationalists intended to attack their enemy from both fronts, using their besieged force as a bait, which would hold out long enough for the reinforcement to arrive. However, besieged nationalists could not hold as long as they were hoped to, because of the difficult landscape: the vegetation was sparse and there was not any water source. The rugged terrain meant that it was nearly impossible for the nationalist defenders to build any fortification and thus they were directly exposed to the enemy fire, suffering huge casualties. To compound the problem, most if not all heavy weaponries had to be abandoned because they could not be carried to the mountain tops. Furthermore, due to the lack of water, the water-cool machine guns could not function properly even after they were carried up to the mountain tops. The airdrop was completely insufficient to fulfill the daily need of the besieged force either.

== The critical minute ==
Chiang Kai-shek ordered nearby nationalist forces to do their best to save the besieged 74th Reorganized Division, but the communists were aided by the internal fights among the nationalists. Li Tianxia, the commander of the nationalist 83rd Reorganized Division was a personal foe of Zhang Lingfu, the commander of the nationalist 74th Reorganized Division, and he was not willing to commit fully to save his foe. In addition, Li Tianxia was very worried that the communists were using the besieged nationalist division as a bait to annihilate his own force, since his own division was not as tough as the 74th Reorganized Division, which could withstand the communist onslaught and survive. If Li Tianxia's 83rd Reorganized Division were to be ambushed on the way in the open without any fortification on its way to save the besieged nationalist force, it would be certain that his weaker division would be completely destroyed. As a result, Li Tianxia only sent out a single regiment in a symbolic move, and just as he had expected, this regiment was completely destroyed by the waiting enemy. In contrast, the nationalist 25th Reorganized Division under the command of Huang Botao ventured out in full strength to carry out Chiang Kai-shek's order, and by May 14, they had reached the Yellow Cliff (Huang Ya, 黄崖) Mountain, which was a merely 6 km away from Menglianggu region, the last natural barrier. Both sides were keenly aware that whoever controlled the Yellow Cliff Mountain would decide the outcome of the campaign, and both sent out their crack troop to take the commanding peak of the mountain.

The 16th Division of the communist 6th Column was tasked with capturing and securing the Yellow Cliff Mountain, and its 48th Regiment was the vanguard. After a forced march with troops had to eat and even sleep while on the march, the communist 48th Regiment finally reached the eastern foothill of Yellow Cliff Mountain. At the same time, a detachment of the nationalist 25th Reorganized Division also reached the western foothill of Yellow Cliff) Mountain. The 9th Company of the 3rd Battalion of the 48th Regiment of the 16th Division of the communist 6th Column under its commander Zhai Zuguang (翟祖光) scaled the cliff from the eastern slope, and after approximately 50 minutes, the communist company successfully occupied the commanding heights and other positions on the peak. Meanwhile, the nationalists were only 30 meters away, a minute of climbing, but very unfortunately, they were just a minute too late. The communist company immediately opened up everything they had, pouring dense firepower onto the approaching nationalists who almost succeeded, but was forced to make a hasty retreat after suffering dozen fatalities under enemy fire, and the Yellow Cliff Mountain would be firmly remain in the communist hand for the rest of the campaign. While the 48th Regiment of the 16th Division of the communist 6th Column maintained the firm control of the Yellow Cliff Mountain, adjacent positions including Ferocious Tiger (Menghu, 猛虎) and Ten Thousands Springs (Wan Quan, 万泉) Mountains were firmly in the hands of the rest units of the 16th Division of the communist 6th Column. Although the nationalists launched attacks on the communist positions with battalions and regiments, all of them were successfully repelled. When Wang Bicheng, the commander of communist 6th Column recalled the situation in an interview 32 years later in Wuhan, he still expressed the fear and appreciation of the communist luck: had the communists were a minute late and the nationalists were a minute earlier, the outcome of the Menglianggu Campaign would be quite different. Su Yu, the commander of East China Field Army who directed the campaign also expressed the same feeling numerous times.

== Fall of the nationalist headquarters ==
Realizing that they were being in endangered being surrounded from behind, as well as facing counterassault in front if 74th Reorganized Division was not destroyed immediately, the communists decided that they must destroy the nationalist 74th Reorganized Division in time, at all cost, so the communists launched their general assault in the afternoon of May 15. The communist redeployed their forces, with the communist 1st Column in the west, the communist 4th Column in the north, the communist 6th Column in the south, the communist 8th Column in the north, and the communist 9th Column in the northeast, attacking the besieged nationalist 74th Reorganized Division at five fronts simultaneously. Realizing that the nationalist 74th Reorganized Division was in danger of being wiped out if reinforcement could not arrive in time, in the morning of May 16, Chiang Kai-shek personally issued another order once again to demand the 10 nationalist army-sized reorganized divisions reinforcing the besieged nationalist 74th Reorganized Division, but progress was extremely slow and by the fastest speed, it would still take days according to the progress already made: the advance of 8 army-sized reorganized divisions and 2 division-sized brigades that were closest to the besieged 74th Reorganized Division were all completely checked in the morning of May 16 by the communist forces deployed on their ways to blocking them. The battles at the Menglianggu region were fierce after the communist launched their general assault in the afternoon of May 15, with most positions changing hands multiple times.

The communist 4th Column first took Mount 330, and then took the region in between Mount 520 and the western half of Mount 540, thus successfully cutting off the retreating route of the nationalists. Realizing the dangerous situation, the nationalists launched several counterattacks, but all were beaten back with stubborn enemy resistance. With the reinforcements from the communist 1st Column and 9th Column, the communist 4th Column further attacked and took Mount 520 by midnight, killing most of the defenders. The surviving nationalist defenders of Mount 520 fled to Mount 540, but the communists would not give them a break and continued their attack on Mount 540. A detachment of the communist 4th Column scaled the cliff of the western half of Mount 540 and outflanked the defenders and launched a surprise attack. The surprised nationalist defenders could not react in time and rapidly fled toward the eastern half of Mount 540, and the nationalist commander Zhang Lingfu was unable to stop his fleeing troops and his headquarters was dangerously exposed to the fire of the attacking enemy. Although the nationalist commander was able to make his timely retreat just in time from the eastern half of Mount 540 with rest of his staffs when he was forced to relocate his headquarters to Mount 570, but due to the heavy casualties of staff officers, the remaining headquarters was only a mere fraction of what it once was and could not function normally anymore like it used to. At dawn on May 16, the nationalists counterattacked the western half Mount 540 held by the communists in waves under fire cover, and the strength of their attack forces eventually grew to regimental size from the original company size. Communist troops of the 4th Column guarding the mount were exhausted and the nationalists seemed to be able to achieve their objective. At the last moment, communist reinforcement from the 1st Column and 4th Column arrived just in time and successfully destroyed the counterattacking nationalist forces. The nationalists, however, were able to successfully driven back the communist attacks headed by the communist 9th Column to the eastern half of Mount 540, but they were unable to prevent the communist 6th Column and 8th Column from attacking toward Mount Lu after successfully destroying nationalist forces in the area.

The communist 9th Column launched another offensive simultaneously against the eastern half of Mount 540, Mount 570, and the main peak of Menglianggu mountains, with a portion of its force attacking the nationalists, held eastern half of Mount 540 from the north and northeast, and the remaining forces attack the other two positions in the nationalist hands. By this time, the nationalist 74th Reorganized Division became disorganized and most units were fighting on their own after losing direct contact with the divisional headquarters over the phone, and orders and reports had to be sent via couriers and the few remaining radios. Due to the close proximity of the opposing sides and rapid enemy advance, the supplies and ammunitions airdropped by the nationalist air force in this stage of the war mostly landed on communist positions. The communists also utilized the prisoners-of-wars to operate the newly captured heavy artilleries pieces from the nationalists. The captured nationalist artillery crew was reluctant at the first and shelled the communist force attacking the nationalist position instead. After one of the artillery crew was executed in front of others, the prisoners-of-wars dared not to play anymore tricks and every round landed on its mark. By 08:00 on May 16, with nationalists strongholds at Eagle's Nest and Mount Lu falling into the enemy hands', all nationalist positions on the surface with the exception of Mount 540 had fallen, and most of the defenders were forced into caves. At 13:00 pm, the communist 4th Column gathered five mountain guns and bombarded the eastern half Mount 540 while infantries advanced toward the nationalists held eastern half from the west. Meanwhile, the communist 6th Column also attacked the eastern half mount from the south. By 14:00, Mount 540 had fallen and the nationalist 51st Brigade was completely destroyed. Meantime, units of the communist 6th Column and 8th Column cleared out the remaining nationalist defenders in their caves of Mount Lu, completely destroying the surviving 3,000 troops of the nationalist 58th Brigade.

== Nationalist commander's death ==
When the Communists sent one of Zhang Lingfu's own distant relatives (nephew) to deliver the request for his surrender, Zhang Lingfu refused and had his nephew executed. The Communists consequently sent captured nationalist prisoners of war back to continue to request Zhang Lingfu's surrender, but the nationalist commander stubbornly refused and wanted to have them executed as well. However, his subordinates convinced him not to execute anyone else, as it would only help no one but the enemy propagandists. Still, the inevitable end was near. After learning that the nationalist commander had refused to surrender, the communists organized several assault teams to charge the nationalist commander's hideout. Each communist assault team consisted of seven members, and a communist squad commander of the 2nd company of the 1st Battalion of the 69th Regiment of the 23rd Division of the East China Field Army named Ge Zhaotian (葛兆田) was among the last assault team that finally reached their destination after all previous communist assault teams were killed. After fierce battle, the communist assault team only consisted of three members led by a deputy platoon commander when they reached the outside of the cave where Zhang Lingfu's headquarters was located, and requested the nationalists inside to surrender. As others went out the cave to surrender, Zhang Lingfu emptied his last magazine of ammunition on the communists, severely wounded the communist deputy platoon commander. This enraged the communists who fired back, and as Zhang Lingfu was fleeing further into the cave, he was shot and killed along with several other nationalists by the submachine gun fire from the communist squad commander Ge Zhaotian in the assault team. The surviving nationalists shouted to the communist to stop firing because they would indeed surrender and threw out their weapons, and a total of eighty-three survivors came out hiding from the cave and nearby makeshift fortifications (mainly a waist-high stone wall constructed by the nationalists earlier). All were captured alive and led away to the prisoner-of-war camps.

By this time, the communist reinforcement led by a deputy divisional commander named Dai Wenxian (戴文贤) arrived, and seeing Zhang Lingfu's cadaver, the communist deputy commander was very upset because capturing the nationalist commander alive would be much bigger and better political propaganda, and that was exactly how communists had wanted, so Dai Wenxian asked angrily: "Who shot him? And Why?" Not knowing the nationalist officer killed was Zhang Lingfu, Ge Zhaotian angrily shouted back at his deputy divisional commander: "Why wouldn't I shoot him when he was shooting at me? I would shoot back even if he was Chiang Kai-shek!" The communist deputy divisional commander could not say anything more and had to excuse his soldier by asking him to help other to march the prisoners-of-war down the slope. Ge Zhaotian did not find out that he had killed Zhang Lingfu until years later. One of Zhang Lingfu's bodyguard named Zhu Fanyou (朱凡友) joined the communists after the campaign and became Ge Zhaotian's good friend after being assigned to the same squad. The two participated together in the remaining of the Chinese Civil War and Korean War, and then stationed together at Niechangshan (内长山) Fortification. It was only during this period when Zhu Fanyou finally revealed to Ge Zhaotian that the nationalist commander he killed was Zhang Lingfu. Although Zhang Lingfu's action well qualified him as a nationalist martyr, the nationalist regime honored its martyr in a different way by claiming that he committed suicide instead, as described in the eulogy titled "A summons to arms of Painfully mourning the (nationalist) 74th (Reorganized) Division" (痛悼74师檄文) written by Chiang Kai-shek, who claimed that over 20 nationalist commanders had committed suicide, while in reality, most of them were killed in action on the front line during the fierce fight against the enemy. Only the deputy commander of the Reorganized 74th Division, Major General Cai Renjie (蔡仁杰, 1902–1947), and the commander of the Reorganized 58th Brigade of the Reorganized 74th Division, Major General Lu Xing (卢醒, 1911–1947) committed suicide in the campaign.

== Conclusion ==
After the news of their commander's death was known, the nationalist morale collapsed completely and the battle soon ended in the cloudy afternoon on May 16. The communist had fired over 33,000 rounds of artillery shells on the nationalist position at Menglianggu, a shock to the nationalists who believed their communist enemy lacked artilleries and could not achieve such dense firepower. As the communist units reported the nationalist casualties, the total number did not add up right: there was a difference around 10,000 between the sum and the supposed strength of the nationalist Reorganized 74th Division. Su Yu ordered all communist units to search the battlefield again, and it was soon discovered that nationalist survivors were quietly hidden in a valley between the main peak of Menglianggu and Mount 570, waiting for the communists withdraw from the battlefield so that they would be linked up with the nationalist reinforcement afterward. These nationalist troops were observed earlier by various communist units at the higher ground but all mistakenly believed that they were the friendly forces. As the communist 4th, 6th, 8th and 9th Columns approached the surviving nationalists who had run out ammunition, water and supplies, the only option the surviving nationalists had was to surrender and there was not much of a fight, and by 17:00 on May 16, 1947, the campaign was over.

While the battles were raging on at Menglianggu region, other communist formations fighting in other areas had also successfully achieved their objectives of stopping the nationalist reinforcements. The communist 10th Column checked the advance of the nationalist 5th Army near Laiwu, and the communist 3rd Column checked the advance of the nationalist Reorganized 11th Division at the Xintai – Mengyin Highway. The communist 2nd and 7th Columns checked the advance of the nationalist Reorganized 48th Division and the 83rd Division at the region of Green Camel Temple, with the nationalist 83rd Division losing an entire regiment totaling around 1,000, half of the casualties nationalist reinforcement suffered. Other local communist militias threatened Linyi, preventing the nationalists sending additional reinforcements. Under the orders from Gu Zhutong and Chiang Kai-shek, the nationalist reinforcements tried hard to reach the besieged Reorganized 74th Division, with some of the reinforcement reached within 5 km (3.1 mi) of Menglianggu, but due to the stubborn enemy resistance, the nationalist advance was finally checked and the fate of the besieged nationalists were sealed. The communist victory was also due to its ability to mobilize 200,000 civilian to support their war effort, a number greater than the actual number of combatants the communists could muster.

== Outcome ==
Unlike most other nationalist generals killed by the communists during the Chinese Civil War, Zhang Lingfu was buried with full military honor after the campaign by his communist enemy, who had recognized his capability and contribution during Second Sino-Japanese War. Zhang Lingfu was given the same treatment as the communist commanders of equal rank, though the funeral was not as elaborate as that of nationalists due to the communists' lack of material wealth at the time: nobody could find a new, good and clean nationalist uniform for the general and getting one from the nationalists were certainly out of the question, so Zhang Lingfu was buried with a new communist uniform instead. In an unprecedented move, the communists also allowed Zhang Lingfu's nine subordinates captured in the campaign, including a brigade commander with the rank of major general and eight regimental colonels, to participate in Zhang Lingfu's funeral. The nationalist commander's funeral ceremony was held by Xie Shensheng (谢胜坤), the deputy political director of the political directorate of the 6th Column of the communist East China Field Army, who would have an equal rank had the military ranking system existed in the communist force. Zhang Lingfu's widow eventually returned to China and settled in Shanghai after the communist revolution, where she spent rest of her life. Chiang Kai-shek personally ordered Tang Enbo to be removed from his post and Major General Li Tianxia (李天霞), the commander of the nationalist 83rd Reorganized Division court-martialled as the failure to save the nationalist 74th Reorganized Division, and Li's position was filled with his deputy, Major General Zhou Zhidao (周志道).

The result of the campaign was a serious blow to the nationalist morale and a great piece of communist propaganda. The communists met the enemy with both technical and numerical superiority head on, and the entire nationalist Reorganized 74th Division, one of the top five nationalist crack troop units, was completely lost with 12,000 of its 30,000 troops killed and the remaining 18,000 captured. The nationalist reinforcement also suffered 2,000+ fatalities averaging 500 fatalities per day in the four-day-long campaign. The nationalist internal power struggle played an important role in the nationalist defeat because most nationalist commanders felt that Zhang Lingfu was too arrogant that when he asked the help from other nationalist commanders with higher rank, he acted if he was giving out orders to those ranked above him. Zhang Lingfu's direct superior, Tang Enbo, for example, was scolded by his subordinate Zhang Lingfu in a heated argument over the telephone and Tang was so enraged by the action of his subordinate that he withheld his troops for an entire day, providing the opportunities for the communists to regroup and strength their defense against the nationalist reinforcement. Zhang Lingfu was certainly more capable than most nationalist commanders of his time and he and his troops were proud of it, however, Zhang Lingfu and many of his troops chose not to carefully hide their feelings and openly exhibit the feeling, and others were obviously resentful, resulting in the lack of enthusiasm to help Zhang Lingfu when he needed.

The nationalist "Plan of a Decisive Campaign in Central Shandong" (Lu Zhong Jue Zhan Ji Hua, 鲁中决战计划) was in fact, a good battle strategy, as agreed even by their communist enemy, but the nationalist defeat meant that the nationalist original plan of annihilating their communist enemy in a decisive battle was impossible to reach, and the nationalist offensives against communist base in Shandong had encountered a serious setback. The effect not only affected the battlefield in Shandong, but also to a great degree, other battlefields as well, such as that of northern Shaanxi. Had the nationalist reinforcements succeeded in rescuing their besieged comrades-in-arms, they would have also succeeded in annihilating the enemy's main force. In this campaign, the nationalist top commanders performed well in that they had correctly adjusted their strategies according to the changing situation on the battlefield, almost succeeding in achieve their strategic objective, but unfortunately, the field commanders were unable to carry out their mission to the fullest and thus resulting in failure.

== See also ==
- Outline of the Chinese Civil War
- National Revolutionary Army
- History of the People's Liberation Army
