= Defense of the Great Wall =

Army campaign between China and Japan before the Second Sino-Japanese War

- Part of the Inner Mongolian Campaign in the Second Sino-Japanese War and the interwar period
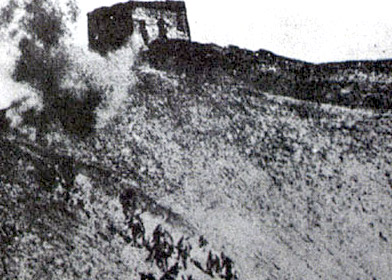
- Great Wall, 1933
Date	January 1 – May 31, 1933 (4 months, 4 weeks and 2 days)
Location	Eastern end of the Great Wall of China, Republic of China
Result	Japanese-Manchukuo victory; Tanggu Truce

Belligerents
(Republic of China (1912–1949)) China	(Empire of Japan) Japan; Manchukuo

Commanders and leaders
(Republic of China (1912–1949)) Zhang Xueliang; (Republic of China (1912–1949)) He Yingqin; (Republic of China (1912–1949)) Xu Tingyao; (Republic of China (1912–1949)) Song Zheyuan; (Republic of China (1912–1949)) Tong Linge; (Republic of China (1912–1949)) Zhang Zizhong; (Republic of China (1912–1949)) Zhao Dengyu	(Empire of Japan) Nobuyoshi Mutō; (Manchukuo) Zhang Haipeng

Strength
Northeastern Army: 50,000+	Japan: 50,000; Manchukuo: 42,000

Casualties and losses
From 1 January until 24 May 1933: 518 officers and 15,248 soldiers killed 1,122 officers and 21,501 soldiers wounded	From January until May 1933: 2,400 casualties In the Rehe Campaign (24 February until 18 March 1933): 171 combat deaths.

The defense of the Great Wall (traditional Chinese: 長城抗戰; simplified Chinese: 长城抗战; pinyin: Chángchéng Kàngzhàn) (January 1 – May 31, 1933) was a campaign between the armies of the Republic of China and the Empire of Japan, which took place before the Second Sino-Japanese War officially commenced in 1937 and after the Japanese invasion of Manchuria in 1931. It is known in Japanese as Operation Nekka (熱河作戰, Nekka Sakusen) and in many English sources as the First Battle of Hopei.

During this campaign, Japan successfully captured the Inner Mongolian province of Rehe from the Chinese warlord Zhang Xueliang, and incorporated it into the newly created state of Manchukuo, whose southern frontier was thus extended to the Great Wall of China.

== Battle of Shanhai Pass ==
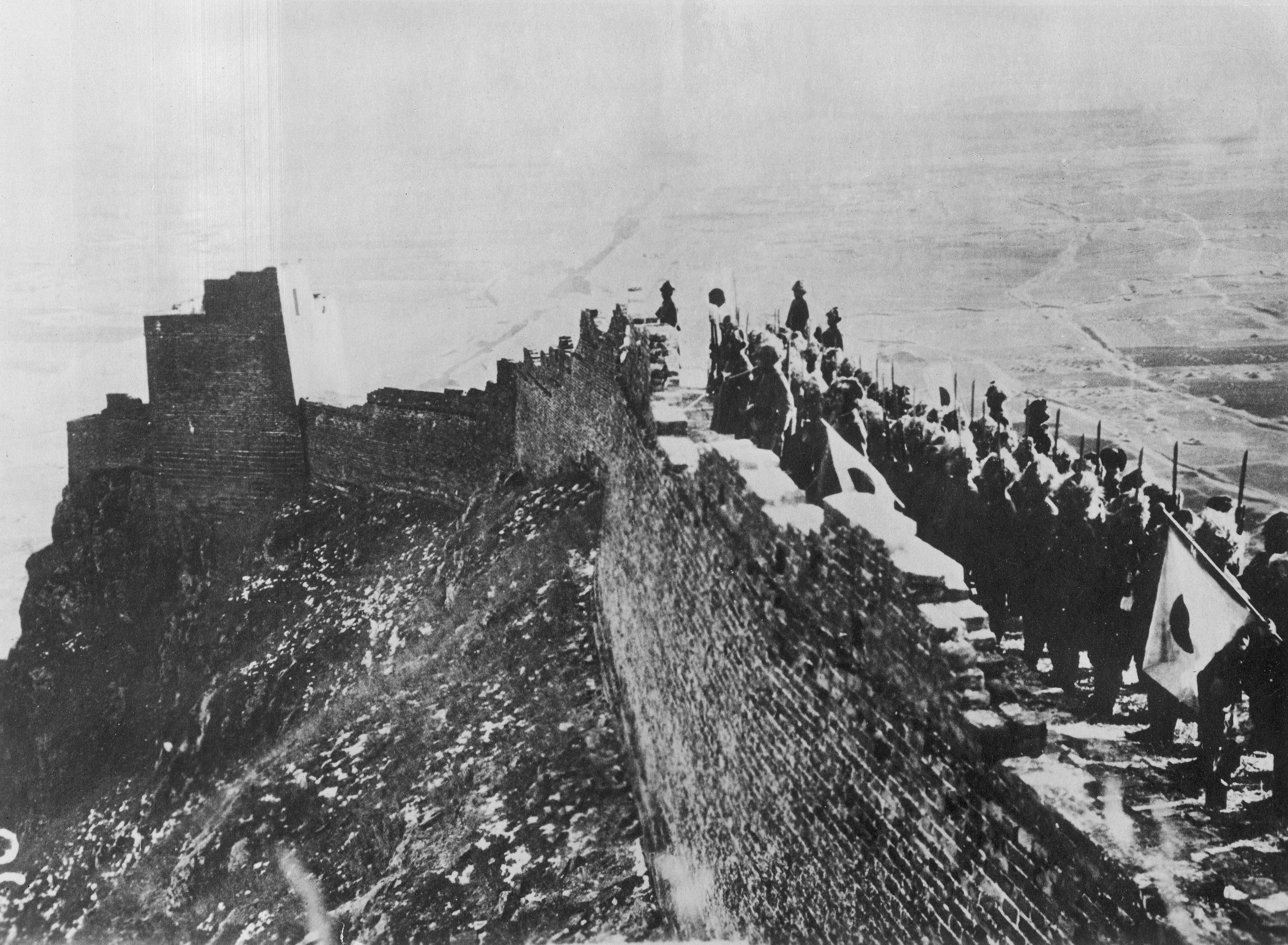
Japanese soldiers on the captured section of the Great Wall of China in Shanhaiguan.

Shanhaiguan is the fortified eastern end of the Great Wall of China, where the Great Wall meets the ocean. Per the terms of the 1901 Boxer Rebellion accord, the Imperial Japanese Army maintained a small garrison of around 200 men at Shanhaiguan. On the night of 1 January 1933, the Japanese garrison commander staged an "incident" by exploding a few hand grenades and firing a few shots. The Kwantung Army used this as an excuse to demand that the Chinese 626th Regiment of the Northeastern Army, guarding Shanhaiguan, evacuate the pass defenses.

When the Chinese garrison refused, the Japanese 8th Division issued an ultimatum, and then attacked the pass with the support of 4 armored trains and 10 tanks. The Japanese attack was supported by close air support from bombers, and by shelling by warships of the Imperial Japanese Navy's IJN 2nd Fleet with a dozen warships offshore. On January 3, Chinese regimental commander Shi Shian, unable to withstand this attack, was forced to evacuate from his positions after losing half of his force.

== Battle of Rehe ==
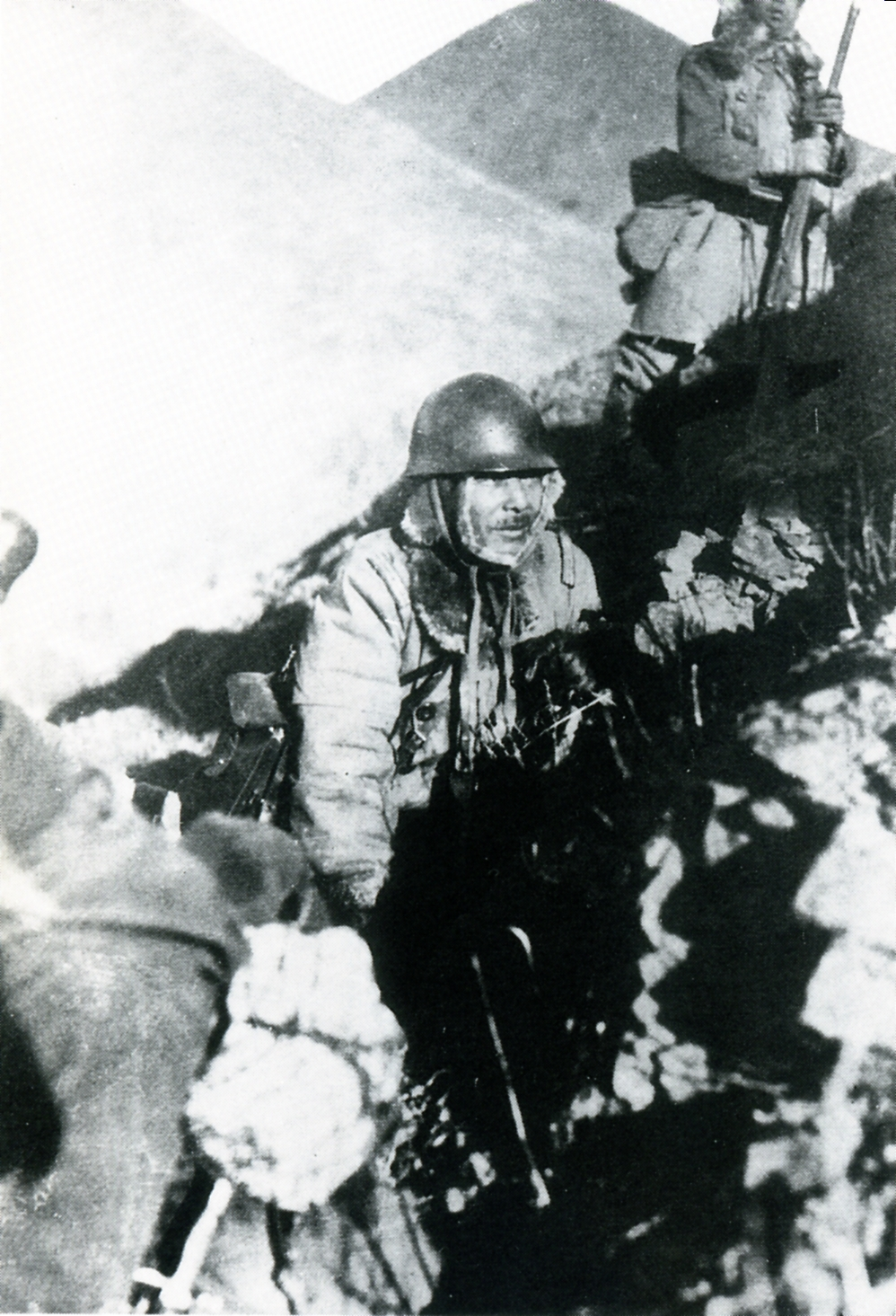
32nd Infantry Regiment Commander Tanaka Seiichi and his troops capturing Gubeikou Pass on the Great Wall.

The province of Rehe, on the northern side of the Great Wall, was the next target. Declaring the province to be historically a portion of Manchuria, the Japanese Army initially hoped to secure it through the defection of General Tang Yulin to the Manchukuo cause. When this failed, the military option was put into action. The Japanese army's Chief of Staff requested Emperor Hirohito's sanction for the 'strategic operation' against Chinese forces in Rehe. Hoping that it was the last of the army's operations in the area and that it would bring an end to the Manchurian matter, the Emperor approved, while stating explicitly that the army was not to go beyond the Great Wall. On February 23, 1933, the offensive was launched. On February 25, Chaoyang and Kailu were taken. On March 2, the Japanese 4th Cavalry Brigade encountered resistance from the forces of Sun Dianying, and after days of fighting, took Chifeng. On March 4, Japanese cavalry and the 1st Special Tank Company took Chengde the capital of Rehe.

Falling back from Rehe, Wan Fulin's 32nd Army retreated to Lengkou Pass, while the 29th Army of General Song Zheyuan also fell back, Zhang Zuoxiang's 37th Division retreated to Xifengkou Pass, General Guan Linzheng's 25th Division to the Gubeikou Pass.

On March 4, the 139th Division of the KMT 32nd Army managed to hold Lengkou Pass, and on March 7, the KMT 67th Army withstood attacks by the 16th Brigade of the Japanese 8th Division, at Gubeikou Pass.

On March 9, Chiang Kai-shek held discussions with Zhang Xueliang in Baoding about resisting the Japanese invasion. Chiang Kai-shek began to relocate his forces away from his campaign against the Jiangxi Soviet, which would include the forces of Huang Jie, Xu Tingyao and Guan Linzheng. Chiang Kai-shek also called over Fu Zuoyi's 7th Army from Suiyuan. However, his actions were too late and the reinforcements were of insufficient strength to stop the Japanese advance.

On March 11, Japanese troops pushed up to the Great Wall itself. On March 12, Zhang Xueliang resigned his post to He Yingqin who, as the new leader of the Northeastern Army, was assigned the duty of securing defensive positions along the Great Wall.

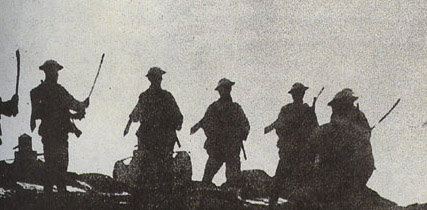
Chinese soldiers armed with dadaos

Over twenty close assaults were launched, with sword-armed Northwestern Army soldiers repelling them. However, on March 21, the Japanese took Yiyuankou Pass. The KMT 29th Army evacuated from Xifengkou Pass on April 8. On April 11, Japanese troops retook Lengkou Pass after dozens of seesaw fights over the pass defenses and Chinese forces at Jielingkou abandoned that pass. The Chinese army was significantly underarmed in comparison to the Japanese and many units were predominantly equipped with handguns, hand grenades, and traditional Chinese swords, with limited supplies of trench mortars, heavy machine guns, light machine guns and rifles. Beaten back by overwhelming Japanese firepower, on May 20, the Chinese army retreated from their remaining positions on the Great Wall.

Although the National Revolutionary Army (NRA) suffered defeat in the end, several individual NRA units like the He Zhuguo platoon managed to hold off the better equipped Japanese army for up to three days before being overrun. Some NRA Divisions also managed to win major victories in passes like Xifengkou and Gubeikou by using the ramparts to move soldiers from one sector to another in the Great Wall, just like the Ming dynasty soldiers before them.

=== Night raid of the 29th Army's Dadao unit ===
After the Japanese Army occupied Xifengkou, the 37th Division of the 29th Army launched a small-scale night raid in the early morning of March 11. After the attack failed, Song Zheyuan ordered the 109th Brigade (consisting of the 217th, 218th, and 224th Regiments) of the division to launch a large-scale night raid in the early morning of March 12. While they were eventually forced to withdraw, the raid was touted as a great achievement, with claims of hundreds of Japanese soldiers killed in hand-to-hand combat from Dadao swords and 18 artillery pieces captured in the Sanjiazi artillery position. According to Japanese records however, while fierce hand-to-hand combat did occur against Chinese soldiers wielding Dadao swords at Sanjiazi, only one Japanese was killed from a Dadao sword and one had their face slashed but survived the battle with most of the losses coming from artillery and rifle fire. Though there were damages, none of the three artillery pieces were lost and the mountain artillery company of the 14th Mixed Brigade suffered 11 killed and 17 wounded while claiming over 400 abandoned enemy corpses. Including the other raids occurring at the same time, the 14th Mixed Brigade suffered a total of 18 killed and 45 wounded in the night raid of Xifengkou while claiming 730 abandoned enemy corpses and capturing 441 rifles and 380 Dadao swords. The Chinese 217th Regiment recorded in its battle summary over 40 officers and over 600 soldiers casualties attacking Sanjiazi and over 200 more casualties in its vicinity. The 224th Regiment did not record its casualties but suffered setbacks in the night raid and lost a lot of troops in the process. While the claims of 500 to 600 Japanese soldiers killed and 18 artillery pieces captured by the 217th Regiment were very exaggerated, the claims of the other units were worse, with the 224th Regiment claiming to have killed over 1,000 Japanese soldiers with Dadao swords despite only 353 troops of the Japanese 14th Mixed Brigade actually engaged in combat (including 63 from the mountain artillery company at Sanjiazi facing the 217th Regiment) and even claims of over 500 Japanese soldiers captured by the 37th Division. Almost all records of the Dadao unit's battle achievements, which had become the pillar for the spirit of resistance against Japan and a part of China's history, were fabricated.

== Aftermath ==
On May 22, 1933, Chinese and Japanese representatives met at Tanggu, Tianjin, to negotiate an end of the conflict. The resulting Tanggu Truce created a demilitarized zone extending one hundred kilometers south of the Great Wall, which the Chinese army was prohibited from entering, thus greatly reducing the territorial security of China proper, whereas the Japanese were permitted to use reconnaissance aircraft or ground units to make sure that the Chinese complied. Furthermore, the Chinese government was forced to acknowledge the de facto independence of Manchukuo and the loss of Rehe.

In March 1934, a cemetery was built for fallen soldiers of the 17th Army of Chiang Kai-shek's Central Army who were killed in action defending Gubeikou during the Defense of the Great Wall. Another cemetery was built in Bengbu, Anhui and a monument was erected near Nanjing in 1935. Both commemorations, along with the monuments for the fallen soldiers in the liberation of Nanjing during the Northern Expedition and for the fallen soldiers of the 259th Brigade of the 87th Division of the 5th Army in the 1932 Battle of Shanghai, were completely destroyed in 1965.

During the defense of Gubeikou, the Japanese Army reportedly buried the bodies of seven Chinese soldiers of the 25th Division who had fought to the bitter end and erected a monument for them. After the 25th Division fled to Taiwan during the Chinese Civil War, the troops erected a monument shaped like the Great Wall's gate tower with "Shanhai Pass", "Jiumenkou", "Gubeikou", and "Xifengkou" engraved on all four sides with seven statues built for the unknown soldiers. The NRA division was later reorganized into the ROC 234th Combined Arms Brigade whose emblem showed the Republic of China flag planted over the Great Wall to represent its predecessor's defense of Gubeikou.

== See also ==
- Events preceding World War II in Asia
  - Jinan incident (May 1928)
  - Huanggutun incident (Japanese assassination of the Chinese head of state Generalissimo Zhang Zuolin on 4 June 1928)
  - Japanese invasion of Manchuria
    - Mukden Incident (18 September 1931)
  - January 28 incident (Shanghai, 1932)
  - Marco Polo Bridge incident (7 July 1937)
- List of military engagements of the Second Sino-Japanese War
- Order of battle Operation Jehol
- Order of battle Defense of the Great Wall
- Baimaguan Fort
- Suiyuan campaign
- North China Buffer State Strategy
- Chahar People's Anti-Japanese Army
