= Ku Fu-sheng =

Taiwanese painter and graphic artist (1935–2017)

Ku Fu-sheng (Chinese: 顧福生, pinyin: Gu Fusheng) (1935-2017) was a Shanghai-born Taiwanese-American painter. The son of General Ku Chu-tung, he fled with his family to 1948. Graduating from National Taiwan Normal University in 1958, he became associated with the Fifth Moon group. In his later career he studied in Paris and New York and lived in various cities of the United States. His work is best known for his queer-themed oil paintings, which in 2017 were included in a retrospective of LGBT art at the Museum of Contemporary Art Taipei. In 2021, a solo retrospective was mounted at Eslite Gallery. He was Sanmao's painting teacher and a close friend of the author Pai Hsien-yung.
