= Guan Linzheng =

Chinese general

Guan Linzheng 關麟徵 (关麟征)
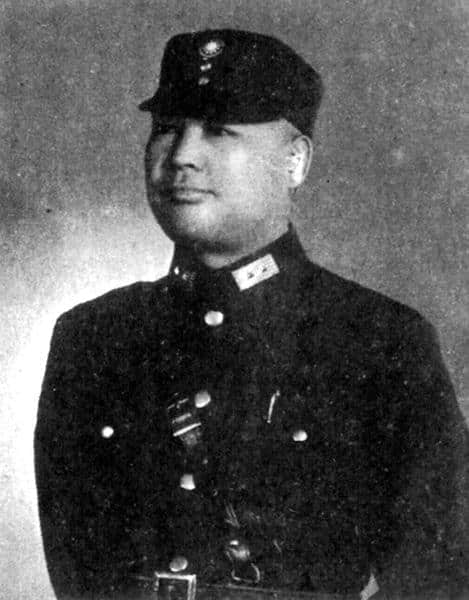
- Guan Linzheng

5th Commander-in-Chief of the Republic of China Army
- In office 25 August 1949 – December 1949
- President: Li Zongren
- Preceded by: Gu Zhutong
- Succeeded by: Gu Zhutong

Personal details
- Born: March 19, 1905 Hu County, Shaanxi, Qing China
- Died: August 1, 1980 (aged 75) British Hong Kong
- Awards: Order of Blue Sky and White Sun; Order of the Precious Tripod (3rd class); Order of the Cloud and Banner (3rd class); Order of Loyalty and Diligence; Medal of Freedom
- Nickname(s): "Guan the Brave", "The Iron Fist"

Military service
- Allegiance: China
- Years of service: 1924–1950
- Rank: General
- Unit: 3rd military police battalion
- Commands: 25th Division; 52nd Corps; 15th Army; 9th Army Group
- Battles/wars: Northern Expedition; Central Plains War; Second Sino-Japanese War, Chinese Civil War

Guan Linzheng (simplified Chinese: 关麟征; traditional Chinese: 關麟徵; pinyin: Guān Línzhǐ; Wade–Giles: Kuan Lin-cheng; March 19, 1905– August 1, 1980) was a Republic of China general who served during the Second Sino-Japanese War and the Chinese Civil War.

== Early life and career ==
Guan Linzheng was born in a rural peasant family in Hu County, Shaanxi. Shanxi General Governor Yu Youren recommended for him to join the Kuomintang headed by Sun Yat-sen in Guangzhou. He attended the Whampoa Military Academy and was a member of the first graduating class in 1925. He suffered a serious knee injury during the Eastern Expedition against the Cantonese warlord Chen Jiongming, who had rebelled against Sun.

In 1926, Guan was appointed to be the battalion commander of the central garrison regiment and participated in the Northern Expedition. In 1927 Guan received a promotion as regiment commander of the General Headquarters of National Revolutionary Army, and was then transferred to the 11th division, one of Chiang Kai-shek's most elite units.

In September 1928, Guan was promoted to brigade commander of the 11th division and later as deputy commander of the newly established 5th division. In 1930 he fought for Chiang Kai-shek's faction during the Central Plains War and was transferred again to the south to attack the Chinese communist forces under Red Army commander Chen Geng in Hubei, forcing them to retreat during Long March two years later. He was then promoted to command the 25th division following his victory over the communists.

== Second Sino-Japanese War ==
In 1933, Guan received orders from the nationalist government to help General Song Zheyuan defend North China against the Imperial Japanese Army led by Field Marshal Nobuyoshi Mutō in the Defense of the Great Wall. He personally led an infantry charge against a Japanese position and was severely wounded in the action, his deputy commander Du Yuming took over command of the division. The nationalist government awarded him the Order of Blue Sky and White Sun after the conclusion of the battle. General Guan's unit stayed in Beiping after this clash as part of the garrison and was post in Luoyang in 1935. In 1936, he led his unit into Shanxi province to help the local warlord Yan Xishan to drive away the communist troops commanded by his former classmate Lin Biao and was successful in his mission.

On October 15, 1936, Guan was promoted to lieutenant general and tasked to block a large Chinese communist force commanded by his former classmate Xu Xiangqian, who had been ordered by the Chinese Communist Party to establish a base in Xinjiang, as part of the communist plan to receive aid from the Soviet Union. Guan defeated the communists in this campaign and Chiang Kai-shek promoted him to commander of the 52nd corps when the Second Sino-Japanese War broke out the next year. Guan led his unit in successive battles against the Japanese Army, which included the Battle of Taierzhuang, Battle of Wuhan, and Battle of Changsha (1939). Because of his personal bravery, he was nicknamed Guan the Brave and the Iron Fist.

In 1938, General Guan was promoted to command the 33rd army, and was promoted to the position of commander-in-chief of 15th army group, becoming the first graduate of the Whampoa Military Academy to command an army group. In 1940, Guan led his unit into Yunnan, and was put in charge of defending the border between China and French Indochina. However, Guan's relation with General Chen Cheng suffered another setback when he decided to remove Chen Cheng's favorite commander General Huang Wei as commander of the 54th corps because of Huang's alleged corruption. In 1944, General Guan received another promotion as deputy commander-in-chief of the 1st Area Army.

== Chinese Civil War ==
Because of Guan's record, he was President Chiang Kai-shek's original choice to lead the American-trained Nationalist troops to Manchuria against Communist troops under Lin Biao in 1945. However, General Chen Cheng opposed Guan's appointment as security commander of Manchuria because of the intense rivalry between the two of them, and Guan was appointed as garrison commander of Yunnan instead. On November 25, college students went on strike in Kunming to protest the resumption of the civil war. Four days later, General Guan held a press conference and stated the government troops has the right to use force to quell the strike, and ordered the students to resume their classes. But on December 1, 1945, Nationalist troops and student protestors clashed with each other and there were many casualties on both sides, Guan was made a scapegoat of the incident and resigned his command the next year. In 1947, Guan succeeded President Chiang Kai-shek as commandant of the Whampoa Military Academy, and was appointed as deputy commander-in-chief of the Republic of China army. In August 1949, the acting president Li Zongren appointed him as commander-in-chief of the army. Chiang Kai-shek appointed Guan's old rival Chen Cheng as chairman of Taiwan, so Guan decided to retire in Hong Kong. He formally resigned his position as commander-in-chief of the army in 1950.

== Retirement in Hong Kong ==
During his retirement in Hong Kong, Guan declined any political activities and spent most of his time in calligraphy and Chinese opera. While Guan's relationship with Chen Cheng was very rivalrous throughout their career, Guan maintained a close friendship with General Hu Lien. Guan also formed a closer relationship with his own former adjutant, General Liu Yuzhang when their children married each other. In April 1975 Guan travelled to Taiwan to attend Chiang Kai-shek's funeral. He died of a heart attack at Queen Elizabeth Hospital on August 1, 1980. Guan and his wife are buried in Rose Hills Memorial Park in Whittier, California.

== Bibliography ==
- Hsu Long-hsuen and Chang Ming-kai, History of The Sino-Japanese War (1937–1945) 2nd Ed., 1971. Translated by Wen Ha-hsiung, Chung Wu Publishing; 33, 140th Lane, Tung-hwa Street, Taipei, Taiwan Republic of China.
