= Baimaguan Fort =

Fort in the village of Fanzipai, north of Beijing

Baimaguan Fort (simplified Chinese: 白马关堡; traditional Chinese: 白馬關堡; pinyin: Báimǎguān) is a fort in the village of Fanzipai (番字牌), north of Beijing and close to the Great Wall of China. It was built in the period of the Yongle emperor (1402-1424) of the Ming Dynasty.

The fort consisted of 500 guards and beacon towers and along with Qiangzilu Fort and Gubeikou Fort, these forts were additional defence along China's northern front.

Little of the original structure has remained, except for the south gate. It is an arched gate, 120 meters wide and 80 meters deep. The characters Bai Ma Guan Fort are inscribed on a stone tablet above the arch. The tablet is somewhat different from those found at other forts, in that the four characters are arranged vertically in two lines, "Bai Ma" on the right and "Guan Bao" on the left. Baima means "white horse" in Chinese.
