= Gu Zhutong =

Chinese general, administrator (1893–1987)

- 顧祝同
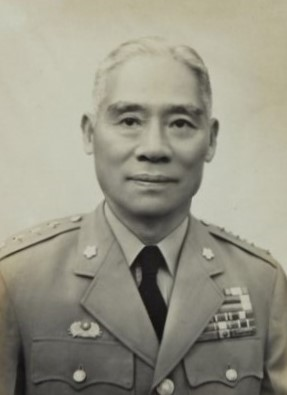
- General Gu Zhutong

2nd Chief of the General Staff of the Republic of China Armed Forces
- In office 13 May 1948 – 24 March 1950
- President: Li Zongren; Chiang Kai-shek
- Preceded by: Chen Cheng
- Succeeded by: Chou Chih-jou

1st, 4th & 6th Commander-in-Chief of the Republic of China Army
- In office 1 June 1946 – 13 May 1948
- President: Chiang Kai-shek
- Preceded by: He Yingqin (as Commander-in-Chief of the Chinese Ground Force of China Theater of the Allies of World War II)
- Succeeded by: Yu Hanmou
- In office 26 June 1949 – 25 August 1949
- President: Li Zongren
- Preceded by: Zhang Fakui
- Succeeded by: Guan Linzheng
- In office December 1949 – March 1950
- President: Li Zongren; Chiang Kai-shek
- Preceded by: Guan Linzheng
- Succeeded by: Sun Li-jen

Personal details
- Born: 9 January 1893 Lianshui County, Jiangsu, Qing Empire
- Died: 17 January 1987 (aged 94) Taipei, Taiwan
- Occupation: Politician
- Awards: Order of Blue Sky and White Sun

Military service
- Allegiance: Republic of China
- Years of service: 1912–1987
- Rank: General
- Unit: various
- Commands: commander-in-chief of the nationalist ground force, chief of the general staff, commander-in of the third war zone
- Battles/wars: Northern Expedition, Central Plains War, Encirclement Campaigns, 1939 Winter Offensive, New Fourth Army Incident, Zhejiang–Jiangxi Campaign, Menglianggu Campaign

Gu Zhutong (traditional Chinese: 顧祝同; simplified Chinese: 顾祝同; pinyin: Gù Zhùtóng; Wade–Giles: Ku^{4} Chu^{4}-t‘ung^{2}; January 9, 1893 – January 17, 1987), courtesy name Mosan (墨三), also rendered as Ku Chu-tung, was a military general and administrator of the Republic of China.

== Biography ==
=== Early life and career ===
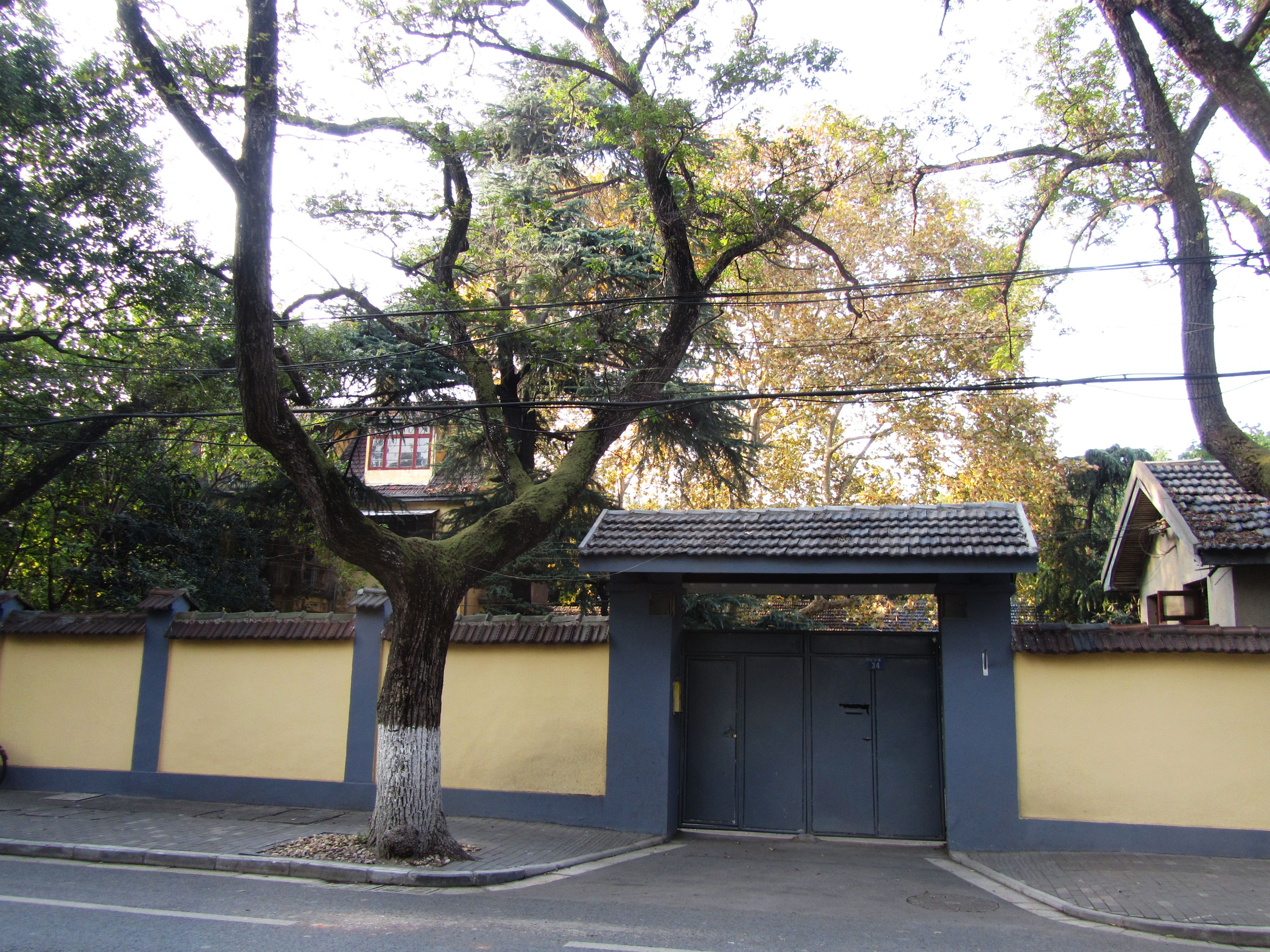
Former residence of Gu Zhutong in Nanjing

Gu was born in Lianshui, Jiangsu province and attended army elementary academy at age 19, When the 1911 Revolution broke out, he soon joined the revolution. In 1912, he joined the Chinese Nationalist Party, and enrolled in Wuhan reserve officer candidate school, and then attend the Baoding Military Academy. In 1922, he went to Canton and became a staff officer of Second Cantonese Army. When Whampoa Military Academy was founded in 1924, he became one of the academy instructors. When the newly formed Nationalist government launched a campaign against a local warlord, he became a battalion commander. During the Northern Expedition, Gu was promoted division commander and then corps commander. In the Central Plains War, he was the commander of the 16th Route Army. In 1931, he became garrison commander of Nanjing, the capital of the Nationalist government. In 1933, he participated in the anti-communist encirclement campaigns. In 1935 he was promoted to general and put in charge of three southwestern provinces, meanwhile he was also the chairman of Jiangsu province. After the breakout of the Second Sino-Japanese War, he was named commander-in-chief of the third war zone. During the New Fourth Army Incident in 1941, Nationalist units under his command destroyed a large contingent of communist troops, and Chiang Kai-shek decorated him with the Order of Blue Sky and White Sun, one of the highest honors for a Chinese commander at the time.

=== Chinese Civil War ===
In 1946, he was named commander-in-chief of the Nationalist Army and pacification director of Zhengzhou, and was put in charge attack communist-controlled areas in Shandong province. In 1947, he lost the critical Menglianggu Campaign, in which the elite 74th Independent Enhanced Division was wiped out by the communist forces. Chiang Kai-shek relieved him of command, and appointed him as Chief of Staff instead.

=== In Taiwan ===
In March 1950, he arrived in Taiwan and was appointed as defense minister, and in 1954 he was promoted to four-star general. In 1956, Gu was appointed as secretary general of the National Defense Council; in 1967 he was named as deputy head of the strategic advisory committee. In 1972, he became an advisor to Chiang Kai-shek and died on January 17, 1987.

=== Private life ===
His son was the artist Ku Fu-sheng.

Political offices
Preceded by Chen Cheng	Chief of the General Staff of the Republic of China Armed Forces; May 13, 1948 - March 24, 1950	Succeeded by Chou Chih-jou
