= Hu Lien =

Chinese general and diplomat (1907–1977)

- 胡璉
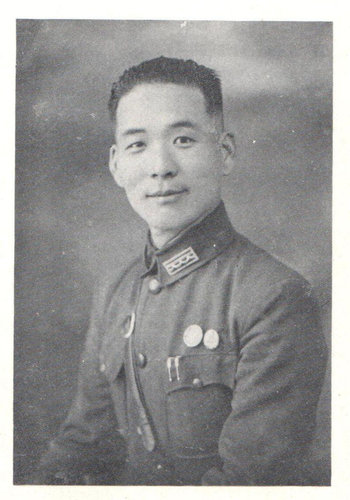
- Hu Lien as a Colonel

Republic of China Ambassador to South Vietnam
- In office 14 October 1964 – 20 December 1972
- Preceded by: Yuan Zijian
- Succeeded by: Xu Shaochang

Personal details
- Born: 16 November 1907 Hua County, Shaanxi, Qing dynasty (now Huazhou District, Weinan, Shaanxi)
- Died: 22 June 1977 (aged 69) Taipei, Taiwan
- Awards: Order of Blue Sky and White Sun
- Nickname: The Old Man

Military service
- Allegiance: Republic of China
- Branch/service: National Revolutionary Army; Republic of China Army
- Years of service: 1926–1974
- Rank: Colonel general
- Unit: 11th division
- Commands: 11th Division; 18th Army; 12th Army Group (Deputy); Kinmen Defense Command
- Battles/wars: Northern Expedition; Central Plains War; Second Sino-Japanese War; Battle of Shanghai; 1st Battle of West Hubei; 2nd Battle of West Hubei; Battle of West Hunan; Chinese Civil War; Nanma–Linqu Campaign; Shuangduiji Campaign; Battle of Guningtou; Battle of Nanri Island; Second Taiwan Strait Crisis

Hu Lien (traditional Chinese: 胡璉; simplified Chinese: 胡琏; pinyin: Hú Liǎn, courtesy name Boyu (伯玉); 16 November 1907 - 22 June 1977) was a Chinese National Revolutionary Army general during the Second Sino-Japanese War and the Chinese Civil War. He later served as the Republic of China's ambassador to South Vietnam from 1964 to 1972.

== Early career ==
Hu was born in Hua County (now Huazhou District), Shaanxi in 1907. He studied at the Whampoa Military Academy, and graduated alongside Lin Biao in 1925. After graduating, he joined the National Revolutionary Army and fought during the Northern Expedition. Following the end of the Northern Expedition, a coalition of warlords led by Feng Yuxiang, Yan Xishan and the New Guangxi clique who had supported the National Revolutionary Army attempted to wrestle control from Chiang Kai-shek's Nanjing government in the Central Plains War. Hu was ordered to command a company against Feng Yuxiang's forces, and despite heavy artillery fire, Hu's company held its position. At the end of the conflict Hu was promoted to battalion commander. During the first phase of the Chinese Civil War, Hu participated in multiple encirclement campaigns against the Chinese Communists, eventually being promoted to deputy commander of the 11th Division just prior to the outbreak of the war with Japan.

== Second Sino-Japanese War ==
Hu was a regiment commander in the 11th division during the Battle of Shanghai. He was wounded several times (including a shot through the jaw) and was promoted to division commander after the Chinese defeat. As part of their proposed Sichuan invasion plan, the Imperial Japanese Army attacked Western Hubei, hoping to destroy the Chongqing government's last remaining power base. Under Hu's command, the newly formed 18th Corps repulsed the Japanese attack. Afterwards, he was awarded with the Order of Blue Sky and White Sun for his brave actions.

== Chinese Civil War ==
Following the end of the Second Sino-Japanese War, the Second United Front dissolved, and the Chinese Civil War quickly resumed. As a result of Hu's military record, his unit was deployed around Central and Eastern China as a firefighting brigade against the Chinese Communists. His campaigns were successful in defeating the People's Liberation Army units led by commanders such as Liu Bocheng and Su Yu. Before the Huaihai Campaign in 1948, Hu's father died and he had dental problems from the jaw wound suffered during Battle of Shanghai, and thus he was absent from the military front. When the 12th Army Group was surrounded by the communist troops in Anhui, Hu was flown in a small airplane to the battlefield, and personally led a rescue mission and breakout from the encirclement with the remnant of his troops. After a week of retreat, he reached Nanjing and Chiang Kai-shek tasked him with reorganizing the 12th Army Group. He had twice been appointed as commander of the Kinmen Defense Command, and defeated the People's Liberation Army forces sent to attack Kinmen during the Battle of Guningtou. Hu also commanded the Republic of China Army forces sent to raid Nanri Island in October 1952. During the Second Taiwan Strait Crisis in August 1958, he was nearly killed by the People's Liberation Army artillery barrage that killed three deputy commanders of the Kinmen Defense Command, Ji Xingwen, Zhao Jiaxiang, and Zhang Jie. By 11 September, the Republic of China's position had improved enough for their forces to start shelling Xiamen on the mainland. In late 1958, Hu's command in Kinmen was replaced by Liu Anqi.

== Later career ==
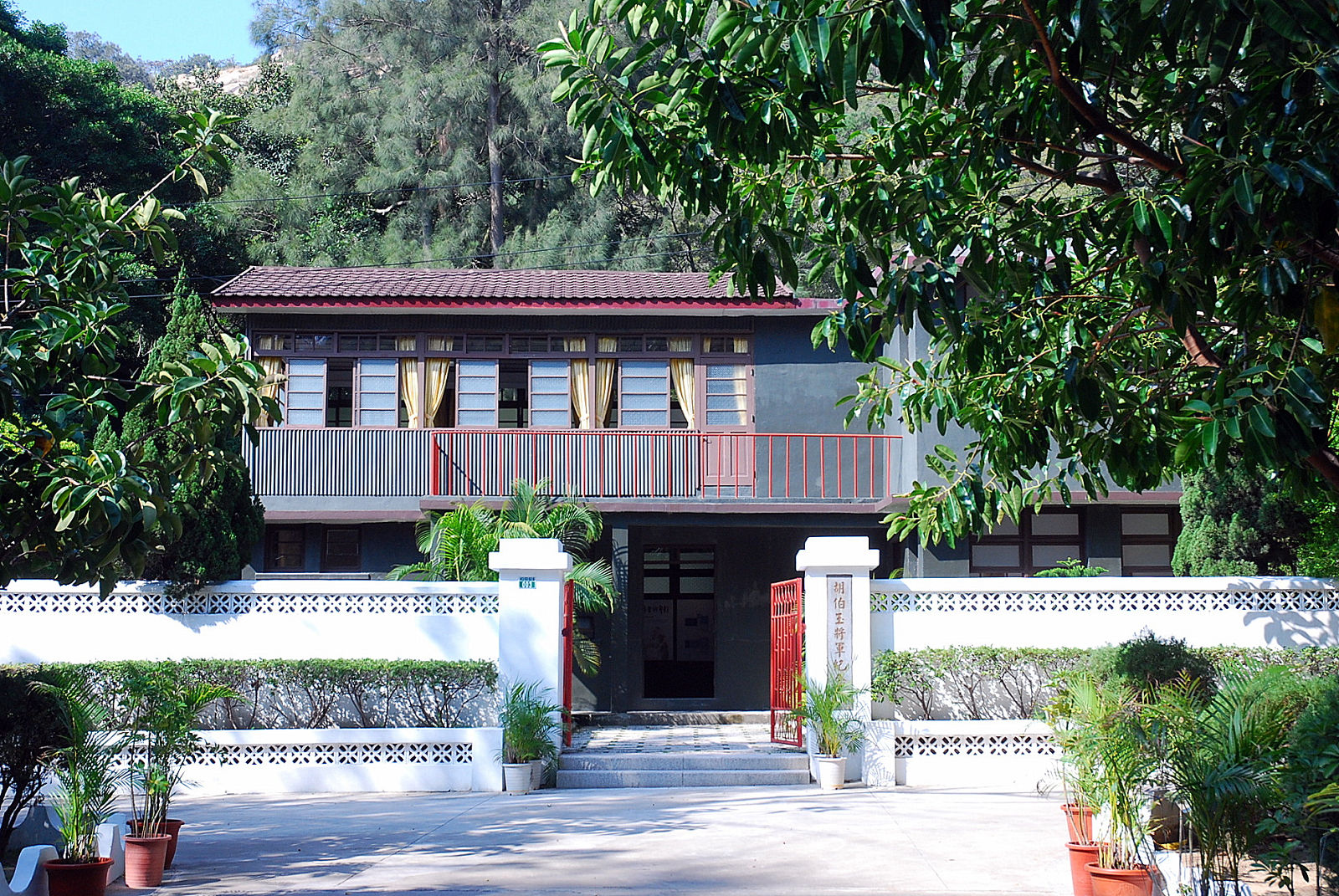
Hu's house in Kinmen

During the Vietnam War, Hu played a major role in Taiwan–Vietnam relations, serving as the ambassador to South Vietnam in Saigon from 1964 to 1972. He survived multiple attempts on his life, such as the 1967 Saigon Republic of China embassy bombing. His appointment to the South Vietnam was part of Taiwan's policy of sharing its expertise in anti-communist affairs with other countries in the region. He returned to Taiwan in 1972 to serve as an advisor to Chiang Kai-shek and was promoted to colonel general. Chiang had deep faith in his military leadership and gave a sword with inlaid jewels to Hu. He retired in 1974 and went to study the history of the Song dynasty at National Taiwan University.

Hu died from a heart attack in Taipei on 22 June 1977 at the age of 69. He was cremated, and his ashes scattered in Shuitou Bay (水頭灣) at Kinmen.

Government offices
Preceded by New position	Commander of 1st Kinmen Defense Command; 1949–1954	Succeeded by Liu Yuzhang
Preceded by Fang Chi	KMT Chairman of Fukien Province and Secretary General and Governor of Fukien Province; November 1949–1 February 1955	Succeeded by Tai Chung-yu
