= Huaiyin, Huai'an =

Huaiyin 淮阴区
- District
- Location in Jiangsu
- Coordinates: 33°37′59″N 118°57′54″E
- Country: People's Republic of China
- Province: Jiangsu
- Prefecture-level city: Huai'an

Area
  - Total: 1,264.1 km^{2} (488.1 sq mi)

Population (2020)
  - Total: 748,791
  - Density: 592.35/km^{2} (1,534.2/sq mi)
- Time zone: UTC+8 (China Standard)
- Postal code: 223300

Huaiyin District (simplified Chinese: 淮阴区; traditional Chinese: 淮陰區; pinyin: Huáiyīn Qū) is one of four districts of the prefecture-level city of Huai'an, Jiangsu Province, China.

== Administrative divisions ==
At present, Yanling County has 14 towns and 7 townships.

14 towns

- Wangying (王营镇)
- Zhaoji (赵集镇)
- Wucheng (吴城镇)
- Matou (码头镇)
- Nanchenji (南陈集镇)
- Wangxing (王兴镇)
- Mianhuazhuang (棉花庄镇)
- Dingji (丁集镇)
- Wuli (五里镇)
- Xuliu (徐溜镇)
- Yugou (渔沟镇)
- Wuji (吴集镇)
- Xisongji (西宋集镇)
- Sanshu (三树镇)

7 townships

- Hanqiao (韩桥乡)
- Xindu (新渡乡)
- Yuanji (袁集乡)
- Lingqiao (凌桥乡)
- Laozhangji (老张集乡)
- Guzhai (古寨乡)
- Liulaozhuang (刘老庄乡)
