= List of divisions of the People's Liberation Army =

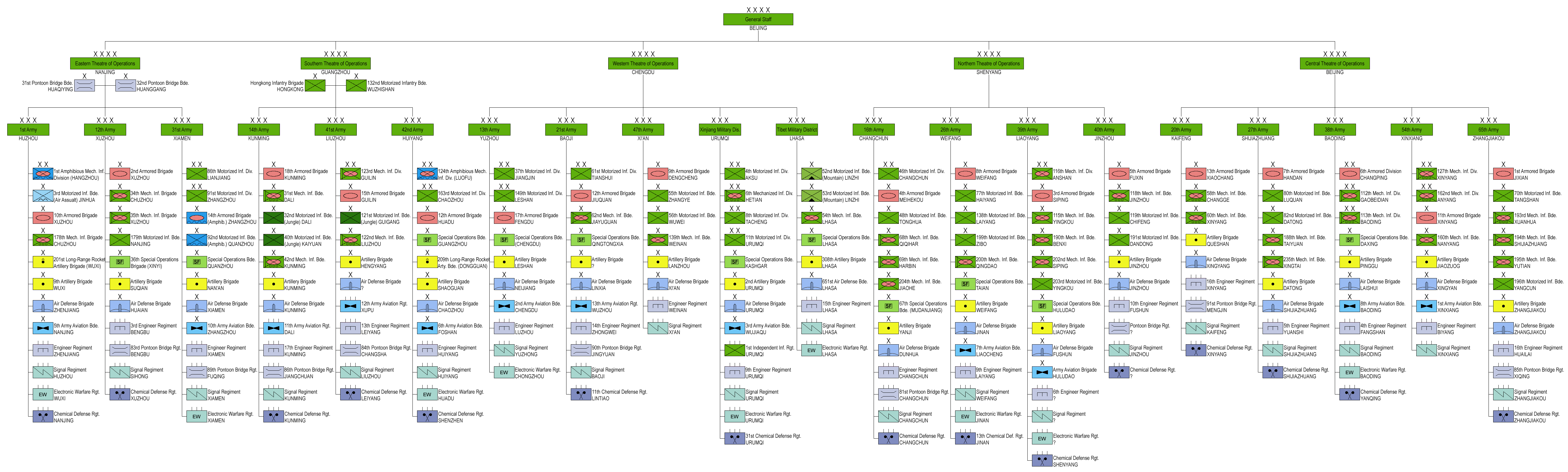
The organization of the PLA Ground Force before April 2017

The People's Liberation Army of the People's Republic of China has had many divisions since it was officially established in 1949. However, a growing number of land and air combat divisions have been disbanded in favour of brigades, a process largely completed by the time the 2015 PLA reforms were implemented around 2017.

== Infantry divisions ==
- 1st Amphibious Mechanized Infantry Division – 1st Group Army, Nanjing Military Region. Listed in Federation of American Scientists (FAS). (now active as 1st Amphibious Combined Arms Brigade)
- 1st Guard Division – PLA Beijing Garrison, Central Theater Command
- 2nd Infantry Division – division transferred to the People's Armed Police to become the 8690 Unit (often referred to as the 2nd Armed Police Mobile Division) in the 1990s.
- 3rd Division (1st Formation) of the 1st Group Army was deactivated in 1952.
- 3rd Division (2nd Formation) was formed in May 1969 and now active as 7th Armed Police Mobile Division.
- 3rd Division (3rd Formation) was renamed from the 7th Division in December 1969 and is now active as 3rd Motorized Infantry Brigade.
- 4th Division – Xinjiang Military District, Lanzhou Military Region
- 5th Division (1st Formation) is now the 5th Xinjiang Agriculture Construction Division.
- 5th Division (2nd Formation) was reduced to a brigade in 1985.
- 6th Division (1st Formation) is now 2nd Xinjiang Agriculture Construction Division.
- 6th Division (2nd Formation) – Lanzhou Military Region.
- 7th Division (1st Formation) is now 3rd Motorized Infantry Brigade.
- 7th Division (2nd Formation) is now the 7th Armed Police Mobile Division.
- 8th Division (1st Formation) was disbanded in 1952 when the 3rd Corps was merged into the 1st Corps.
- 8th Division (2nd Formation) was formed in 1969 from 1st Cavalry Division. It's now 8th Motorized Infantry Division.
- 9th Division - disbanded in 1952.
- 10th Division - disbanded in 1952.
- 11th Motorized Infantry Division - Western Theater Command, formerly Lanzhou MR. Military district.
- 12th Division
- 13th Division
- 14th Division
- 15th Division
- 16th Division
- 17th Division
- 18th Division
- 19th Division
- 20th Division (1st formation) 1949-50, became 7th Artillery Training Base. Reformed.
- 21st Division
- 22nd Division
- 23rd Division
- 24th Division
- 25th Division - In May 1953, the 25th, 26th and 27th Divisions of the 9th Corps were reorganized as 7th, 8th and 9th Agriculture Construction Division of the Xinjiang Production and Construction Corps, respectively.
- 26th Division
- 27th Division
- 28th Division - 28th Army Division to 1969. Then redesignated 205th Division.
- 29th Division – with 15th Army served in Korean War. Now as 56th Motorized Infantry Brigade.
- 30th Division
- 30th Infantry Division
- 30th Army Division
- 31st Division – with 11th Army during Sino-Vietnamese War. Chengdu MR JSENT p. 91. First formation became the 36th Motorized Infantry Brigade (People's Republic of China). Second formation remains the 31st Motorized Infantry Division (People's Republic of China).
- 32nd Division – with 11th Army during Sino-Vietnamese border conflict.
- 33rd Division – Served in the Korean War as the 33rd Independent Division. Second Formation was 33rd Army Division (2nd Formation) (People's Republic of China) from 1979-85.
- 34th Division – 12th Army with 31st, 34th, and 35th Divisions entered Korea on March 25, 1951. Routed during the Battle of the Soyang River.
- 35th Division
- 36th Division
- 37th Division – with 13th Army during Sino-Vietnamese border conflict
- 38th Division – with 13th Army during Sino-Vietnamese border conflict
- 39th Division – with 13th Army during Sino-Vietnamese border conflict
- 40th Division – 14th Group Army - Chengdu MR. Served in S-V War with 14th Army (People's Republic of China). JSENT p. 91.
- 41st Division – served in Sino-Vietnamese War with 14th Army.
- 42nd Division – served in Sino-Vietnamese War with 14th Army.
- 43rd Division - formed 1949, disbanded 1950.
- 43rd Airborne Division – 89th Division (People's Republic of China) reorganised as an airborne formation, renumbered, now airborne with 15th Airborne Army.
- 44th Airborne Division – now airborne with 15th Airborne Army. Served in Korea War. Entered Korea with 15th Army in February 1951.
- 45th Airborne Division – now airborne with 15th Airborne Army. Served in Korea War. Entered Korea with 15th Army in February 1951.
- 46th Division
- 47th Infantry Division
- 48th Infantry Division
- 49th Division
- 50th Division
- 51st Division Formed twice. Second formation became the Independent Division of Hubei Provincial Military District.
- 52nd Division Formed three times. Second formation became the 149th Motorized Infantry Division. Third formation became the 52nd Mountain Motorized Infantry Brigade.
- 53rd Division. Formed twice. Second formation became 53rd Mountain Motorized Infantry Brigade.
- 54th Division
- 55th Division. Originally 19th Corps. 19th Corps was in 1969 at Wuwei, Gansu with the 55th, 56th, and 57th Divisions.
- 56th Division
- 57th Division. Formed twice. First formation became 1st Fossil Oil Engineer Division. 57th Division (Second Formation).
- 58th Division – 20th Group Army, but commanded by the 50th Army during the Sino-Vietnamese War. Converted to a brigade in 1999.
- 59th Division – Component of 20th Army during Korean War. Disbanded 1985.
- 60th Division
- 61st Division – 21st Army served in Korea War. Now 21st Group Army, Shaanxi Province. JSENT p. 90 Listed FAS, 21st GA
- 62nd Division – 21st Army served in Korea War.
- 63rd Division – 21st Army served in Korea War.
- 64th Division
- 65th Division
- 66th Division
- 67th Motorised Infantry Brigade, 23rd Group Army, 'demobilised' during 2003 reductions cycle (Blasko 2006, 77). With 23rd Army in Korea.
- 68th Division – subordinate to Shenyang MR. Now 68th Motorized Infantry Brigade, Qiqihar, Heilongjiang (from 23rd Group Army).
- 69th Division – Shenyang MR. JSENT p. 91 Listed FAS. With 23rd Army in Korea. Now 69th Motorized Infantry Division, Harbin, Heilongjiang (from 23rd Group Army).
- 70th Division – served with 24th Army in Korea. Now 3rd Guard Division.
- 71st Division (1st Formation). Disbanded and headquarters reorganized as 15th Fighter Aviation Division, May 1951. 71st Division formed later.
- 72nd Division – with 24th Army served in Korea War.
- 73rd Division – with 23rd Army served in Korea War.
- 74th Division – with 24th Army served in Korea War.
- 75th Division
- 76th Division
- 77th Division – 26th Army served in Korea War
- 78th Division – 26th Army served in Korea War
- 79th Division – 27th Army
- 80th Division – 27th Army
- 81st Division – 27th Army
- 82nd Division
- 83rd Division
- 84th Division
- 85th Division
- 86th Division – 31st Army. Second formation 86th Motorized Infantry Division (People's Republic of China) – 26th Army served in Korea War
- 87th Division
- 88th Division – 26th Army served in Korea War
- 89th Division – operating with 20th Army in Korea. Disband in February 1951.
- 90th Division, 1949–1950
- 90th Division, 1950–1952
- 91st Division – 31st Army
- 92nd Infantry Division – 31st Army
- 93rd Infantry Division – 31st Army
- 94th Division – with 27th Army served in Korea War. Disbanded in February 1951.
- 95th Division - In October 1950 32nd Corps was disbanded and the division was absorbed into the Air Force. On February 14, 1951, the division was reorganized and renamed as 14th Aviation Division.
- 96th Division
- 97th Division
- 105th Division
- 106th Division – 36th Army - Airfield construction labor during Korean War
- 107th Division
- 108th Division
- 109th Division – 37th Army - Airfield construction labor during Korean War
- 110th Division
- 111th Division
- 112th Division – 38th Army
- 113th Division – 38th Group Army
- 114th Division - 38th Group Army
- 115th Division – 39th Army
- 116th Division
- 117th Division
- 118th Division - Part of 40th Army. 40th Army entered Korea on October 19, 1950 and was the first Chinese formation to make contact with UN forces in Korea.
- 119th Division
- 120th Division
- 121st Division – 41st Army during Sino-Vietnamese War
- 122nd Division – 41st Army during Sino-Vietnamese War
- 123rd Division – 41st Army during Sino-Vietnamese War
- 124th Division – 42nd Army during Korean War and Sino-Vietnamese War
- 125th Division – 42nd Army during Korean War and Sino-Vietnamese War
- 126th Division – 42nd Army during Korean War and Sino-Vietnamese War
- 127th Division – fought in Korean War and with 43rd Army during Sino-Vietnamese border conflict
- 128th Division – with 43rd Army during Sino-Vietnamese border conflict
- 129th Division – with 43rd Army during Sino-Vietnamese border conflict
- 130th Division
- 131st Division
- 132nd Division- with 43rd and 44th Corps/Armies in the 1950s. Now on Hainan Island as 132nd Mechanized Infantry Brigade since 2003.
- 137th Division
- 138th Division - probably originally with 46th Army. 1949-1953 disbanded and reorganised as PLAAF Second Aviation School.
- 139th Division – 47th Group Army, Lanzhou Military Region
- 140th Division
- 141st Division
- 148th Division – 50th Army Entered Korea on October 26, 1950. Fought with 50th Army during Sino-Vietnamese border conflict.
- 149th Division – 13th GA - Suchuan Prov JSENT p. 90 Listed FAS, 13th GA. Belonged to 50th Army while it fought in Sino-Vietnamese border conflict
- 150th Division – 50th Army - Fought with 50th Army during Sino-Vietnamese border conflict.
- 153rd Division
- 154th Division
- 155th Division
- 156th Division - disbanded June 1949, Korean troops to 7th Division, KPA.
- 157th Division
- 158th Division
- 159th Division
- 160th Division – 54th Army, Sino-Vietnamese border conflict
- 161st Division – 54th Army, Sino-Vietnamese border conflict
- 162nd Division – 54th Group Army, Sino-Vietnamese border conflict - Jinan MR; JSENT p. 90.
- 163rd Division – with 55th Army during Sino-Vietnamese border conflict
- 164th Division – the 164th Division (1st Formation), formed on November 1, 1948, basically made up of Korean soldiers, became 5th Division Korean People's Army, July 1949. Reformed twice. With 55th Army during Sino-Vietnamese War.
- 165th Division – with 55th Army during Sino-Vietnamese border conflict
- 167th Division – possibly existed under 56th Army according to U.S. Department of Defense intelligence during the Korean War.
- 179th Division – 12th Group Army; fought in Korean War under 60th Army
- 180th Division – fought in Korean War under 60th Army.
- 181st Division – fought in Korean War under 60th Army
- 187th Division – 63rd Army during Korean War
- 188th Division – 63rd Army served in Korea War. Now Beijing Military Region.
- 189th Division – 63rd Army served in Korea War. 189th Infantry Division (1985–98), then reduced to 189th Motorized Infantry Brigade (1998–2003). Disbanded 2003.
- 190th Division – 64th Army served in Korea War. Listed by Blasko as with 39th Army, 2006.
- 191st Division
- 192nd Division – listed by Blasko 2006 as the 'Liaoning Army Reserve 192nd Infantry Division, Shenyang,' Shenyang MR
- 193rd Division – 65th Army during Korean War. Entered Korea on February 23, 1951. Decimated during the Battle of the Imjin River.
- 194th Infantry Division
- 195th Infantry Division
- 196th Division – 66th Army Entered Korea on October 27, 1950. Served in Korea War
- 197th Division
- 198th Division – 66th Army
- 199th Division – 67th Army served in Korea War. 67th Army left Korea in September 1954.
- 200th Division – 67th Army served in Korea War
- 201st Division – 67th Army served in Korea War
- 202nd Division – 68th Army served in Korea War. 68th Army left Korea in April 1955.
- 203rd Division – 68th Army served in Korea War
- 204th Division – 68th Army served in Korea War.
- 205th Division
- 205th (II)
- 206th (I)
- 206th (II)
- 207th (I)
- 207th (II)
- 207th (III)
- 207th (IV)
- 208th
- 209th (I)
- 209th (II)
- 210th (I)
- 210th (II)
- 211th Division
- 212th Division
- 213th Division
- 214th Division
- 215th
- 216th Division
- 217th Division - 1949-1952; deactivated to provide replacements for the People's Volunteer Army in Korea.
- 218th Division Active until October 1950 as part of 53rd Corps (People's Republic of China).
- 219th Infantry Division. Formed from 164th Division. Active 1952-60 and then 1960-70 as 219th Army Division, part of 55th Corps (People's Republic of China).
- 220th Infantry Division
- 250th Infantry Division

=== Reserve divisions ===
- 1st Reserve Division
- 2nd Reserve Division
- 3rd Reserve Division
- 4th Reserve Division
- 5th Reserve Division
- 9th Reserve Division
- 10th Reserve Division
- 1st Reserve Infantry Division of Beijing
- 2nd Reserve Infantry Division of Beijing
- Reserve Infantry Division of Anhui Provincial Military District
- Reserve Infantry Division of Baicheng
- Reserve Infantry Division of Baoji
- Reserve Infantry Division of Benxi
- Reserve Infantry Division of Chaoyang
- Reserve Infantry Division of Chengde
- Reserve Infantry Division of Dezhou
- Reserve Infantry Division of Duyun
- Reserve Infantry Division of Fuxin
- Reserve Infantry Division of Guangxi Provincial Military District
- Reserve Infantry Division of Guizhou Provincial Military District
- Reserve Infantry Division of Guyuan
- Reserve Infantry Division of Hainan Provincial Military District
- Reserve Infantry Division of Heilongjiang Provincial Military District
- Reserve Infantry Division of Hohhot
- Reserve Infantry Division of Hunan Provincial Military District
- Reserve Infantry Division of Jiangxi Provincial Military District
- Reserve Infantry Division of Jinzhou
- Reserve Infantry Division of Nenjiang
- Reserve Infantry Division of Pingliang (Chinese: 平凉陆军预备役师) - active between 1984 and 1985. It was activated on May 31, 1984, in Pingliang, Gansu. It was composed of the 1st, 2nd, and 3rd Regiments plus an Artillery Regiment. In October 1985 the division was disbanded along with all its subordinates.
- Reserve Infantry Division of Siping
- Reserve Infantry Division of Weinan
- Reserve Infantry Division of Wuwei (Chinese: 武威陆军预备役师) - active between 1984 and 1985. It was formally activated in April 1984 in Wuwei, Gansu. It was made up of the 1st and 2nd Regiments; 3rd Regiment in Yongchang; and an Artillery Regiment. In 1985 the division was disbanded along with all its subordinates.
- Reserve Infantry Division of Xinjiang Military District
- Reserve Infantry Division of Xinzhou
- Reserve Infantry Division of Yan'an
- Reserve Infantry Division of Yanbian
- Reserve Infantry Division of Yantai
- Reserve Infantry Division of Yulin

== Armored divisions ==
- 1st Armoured Division – belong to Beijing MR (1949–2017)
- 2nd Armored Brigade (People's Republic of China) – with 12th Group Army, Nanjing Military Region(now active as 2nd Heavy Combined Arms Brigade)
- 3rd Armoured Division – with 39th Group Army, (1950–2011)
- 4th Armoured Division (1998–2011), now 4th Armored Brigade
- 5th Tank Division (People's Republic of China) 1967–98
- 6th Armored Division (People's Republic of China) (now active as 6th Heavy Combined Arms Brigade)
- 8th Tank Division from 1967–98; Armored Division 1998–2011, 8th Armored Brigade from 2011.
- 10th
- 11th
- 12th

The IISS Military Balance 2012 listed nine armoured divisions as part of the People's Liberation Army.

== Artillery divisions ==
- 1st Artillery Division
- 2nd Artillery Division
- 3rd Artillery Division
- 7th Artillery Division
- 8th Artillery Division
- 9th Artillery Division (1st Group Army)
- 21st Rocket Artillery Division
- 22nd Rocket Artillery Division
- 31st Anti-Tank Artillery Division
- 33rd Anti-Tank Artillery Division
- 61st Anti-Aircraft Artillery Division
- 62nd Anti-Aircraft Artillery Division
- 63rd Anti-Aircraft Artillery Division
- 64th Anti-Aircraft Artillery Division
- 65th Anti-Aircraft Artillery Division
- 70th Anti-Aircraft Artillery Division
- 101st Anti-Aircraft Artillery Division
- 102nd Anti-Aircraft Artillery Division
- 106th Anti-Aircraft Artillery Division
- 5th Antiaircraft Artillery Division of Air Force (People's Republic of China) - 1964-1985
- 107th Anti-Aircraft Artillery Division - 1955-57 then transferred to the Air Force; became 6th Antiaircraft Artillery Division of Air Force (People's Republic of China) in 1964.

=== Reserve divisions ===
- Reserve Artillery Division of Shandong Provincial Military District - activated July 1987 at Jining, reorganised 1999.
- Reserve Antiaircraft Artillery Division of Heilongjiang Provincial Military District
- Reserve Antiaircraft Artillery Division of Hubei Provincial Military District

== Aviation divisions ==
- 1st Fighter Division - stationed at Anshan, Liaoning
- 2nd Fighter Division - stationed at Suixi, Guangdong
- 3rd Fighter Division - stationed at Wuhu, Anhui
- 4th Aviation Division - division disbanded as a fighter formation in 2003, with 10th Regiment going to 30th Division as 89th Regiment. It was re-established as a transport division at Qionglai Air Base in 2004.
- 5th Aviation Division Seemingly disbanded between 2014 and 2017.
- 6th Fighter Division - stationed at Yinchuan, Ningxia
- 7th Fighter Division - established December 1950 flying fighters, at Dongfeng, Jilin. - stationed at Datong, Shanxi
- 8th Aviation Division - established in December 1950 flying bombers at Siping, Jilin. Originally had 22nd and 24th Regiments. Scramble.nl, accessed mid 2015, indicates there are at least six regiments of H-6 bombers. All three regiments of the division fly the aircraft - the 22nd, 23rd (former 143rd Regt/48th Div), and 24th. On November 11, 1965, Li Xianbin (T:李顯斌, S:李显斌), a PLAAF Ilyushin Il-28 captain of the division flew his bomber numbered 0195 from Jianqiao (T:筧橋, S:笕桥) air base in Hangzhou to Taoyuan County, Taiwan (now Taoyuan City), and this became the first fully operational Il-28 in western hands. The radio operator / tail gunner Lian Baosheng (廉保生) was found dead at the scene and the navigator Li Caiwang (李才旺) was captured alive after a suicide attempt. Both survivors were honored and rewarded with positions in the Republic of China Air Force.
- 9th Aviation Division - established in December 1950 as a fighter division at Jilin, Jilin. Transferred to PLA Naval Aviation as 5th Naval Aviation Division in September 1955; reestablished at Ganzhou in March 1956. Stationed at Foshan, Guangdong. After 2012, from the command of the Nanning Base, the division was abolished and split into the 25th and 26th Brigades.
- 10th Aviation Division - established at Nanjing, Jiangsu in January 1951 as a bomber-flying division. In the Eastern Theatre Command.
- 11th Aviation Division - established in February 1951 as a ground-attack formation in Xuzhou, Jiangsu. Long part of the Shenyang Military Region. Stationed at Siping, Jilin
- 12th Fighter Division - established in Xiaoshan, Zhejiang in December 1950 as a fighter unit. Stationed at Yantai, Shandong
- 13th Aviation Division - stationed at Wuhan, Hubei
- 14th Fighter Division - formed February 1951 at Beijing Nanyuan Airport from elements of the disbanding 95th Division. Stationed at Nanchang, Jiangxi. The division fought in Korea, as a mixed MiG-9/MiG-15 fighter unit. Started its second combat tour in April 1953 and ceased combat in July 1953. It appears that in September 1992 the 146th Regiment of the disbanding 49th Air Division may have become the 42nd Regiment.
- 15th Fighter Division Formed from HQ 71st Division (First Formation). Absorbed the 41st Division in 1985.
- 16th Aviation Division Originally established as 19th Inf Div. In August 1988, the division became the Shenyang Military Region Air Force Aviation Training Base, and the regiments were successively changed to the 1st, 2nd, and 3rd Regiments of that Base.
- 17th Aviation Division; Formed April 1951 as a fighter formation. Originally with 49th and 50th Regiments and, then, 51st Regiment from 1953, equipped from the fourth batch of aircraft. Transferred to Naval Aviation 1954, reestablished 1956. "On March 2, 1956, with the approval of the Central Military Commission, the Ministry of National Defense issued an order to [reform] the 17th Air Division. On April 6, 1956, the 17th Division of the Air Force was formally established at Beijing Shahe Airport, and Liu Ying, the deputy commander of the 7th Division of the Air Force, was appointed as the commander of the 17th Division of the Air Force (later the deputy commander of the Ji Air Force), and Guo Qian, director of the Security Department of the Air Force Political Department of the Beijing Military Region He is the political commissar of the 17th Air Division, and Yan Deming is the first deputy division commander and chief of staff. Under its jurisdiction are the 49th Regiment (adapted from the 21st Regiment of the 7th Air Division), the 51st Regiment (adapted from the 41st Regiment of the 14th Air Force Division) and the Shahe Station of the Air Force. Equipped with J-5 and MiG-17 aircraft. It [was assigned] to the Air Force of the Beijing Military Region. In August 1964, the 17th Air Division was ordered to be urgently transferred to the southwest border. The division led the 51st Regiment to station in Mengzi, Yunnan, and the 49th Regiment to station in Kunming, the capital of the province, to participate in the round-robin air defense mission in Yunnan." It was later reorganized into brigades, and in 1969 was sent for combat duty in Fujian. On 25 June 1984, a CAAC Airlines Hawker Siddeley Trident aircraft was hijacked by a man armed with hand grenades and demanded to be flown to Taiwan. A passenger overpowered the hijacker and the aircraft continued to Fuzhou. Aircraft of the division took off to provide security amid the incident.

Saw action at a later date (?) In the early 1980s it was subordinate to the Tangshan Command Post in the Beijing MR flying J-5s (MiG-17F "Fresco-Cs"?) and Shenyang J-6s. On 26 October 1988 the division was reorganized into the Beijing MR Training Base.

- 18th Aviation Division (People's Republic of China) - stationed at Nanning, Guangxi
- 19th Aviation Division (People's Republic of China) - stationed at Zhengzhou, Henan The 57th Regiment, 19th Air Division, at Lianyungang, was re-established from 2nd Regiment, Jinan MR Training Base, in 2010 with J11 after it had been previously disbanded in 1988. However it became a regiment of the reformed 32nd Division in 2012.
- 20th Aviation Division (People's Republic of China)
- 21st Aviation Division (People's Republic of China) - stationed at Mudanjiang, Heilongjiang; absorbed 39th Aviation Division in 1998.
- 22nd Aviation Division - transferred to Shenyang MRAF 1985; disbanded in September 1992. Merged into the 11th Aviation Division; 33rd Aviation Regiment disbanded; 65th and 66th Regiments became "Kong 32 and 33" regiments of the 11th Aviation Division.
- 23rd Aviation Division (People's Republic of China) - division disbanded on August 27, 1985, along with its 67th and 69th Regiments.
- 24th Fighter Division - stationed at Tianjin.
- 26th Aviation Division
- 27th Aviation Division - division headquarters formed from the Army's 8th Division (1st Formation) (see above).
- 28th Aviation Division - stationed at Hangzhou, Zhejiang
- 29th Fighter Division - previously stationed at Hangzhou, Zhejiang, before disbandment circa 2019.
- 30th Fighter Division - stationed at Dandong, Liaoning
- 31st Aviation Division - formed May 1960 in the Jinan Military Region.
- 32nd Aviation Division In 2012 the 57th Regiment, 19th Division got subordinated to the re-formed 32nd Division as 95th Regiment.
- 33rd Fighter Division - stationed at Chongqing
- 34th Transport Division - stationed in Beijing
- 36th Fighter Division - stationed at Xi'an, Shaanxi
- 37th Fighter Division - established August 1966, stationed at Ürümqi, Xinjiang
- 38th Aviation Division - established June 1967.
- 39th Aviation Division - established June 1967; absorbed into 21st Aviation Division and disbanded 1998.
- 40th Aviation Division - established July 1969.
- 41st Aviation Division - established in July–August 1969 in Inner Mongolia, seemingly from training units. Disbanded on November 17, 1985, with the 121st Regiment becoming the 44th Regiment in another division, and the 122nd and 123rd Regiments disbanding.
- 47th Aviation Division - merged with 6th Aviation Division, no longer active.
- 48th Aviation Division - established April 1971
- 49th Aviation Division - established April 1971
- 50th Aviation Division - established April 1971; merged with 8th Aviation Division in 1985. in August 1985, the 149th Regiment of this division was reassigned to the 8th Aviation Division.

== Engineering divisions ==
- 1st Railway Engineer Division
- 2nd Railway Engineer Division
- 3rd Railway Engineer Division
- 4th Railway Engineer Division
- 5th Railway Engineer Division
- 6th Railway Engineer Division
- 7th Railway Engineer Division
- 9th Railway Engineer Division
- 10th Railway Engineer Division
- 11th Railway Engineer Division
- 52nd Engineer Division (People's Republic of China)

== See also ==
- Chinese People's Volunteer Army order of battle
