= 105th =

105th is the ordinal form of the number 105. 105th or One hundred and fifth may also refer to:

- A fraction, 1/105, equal to one of 105 equal parts

== Geography ==
- 105th meridian east, a line of longitude
- 105th meridian west, a line of longitude
- 105th Street (disambiguation)

== Military ==
- 105th Brigade (disambiguation)
- 105th Division (disambiguation)
- 105th Regiment (disambiguation)

== See also ==
- April 15, 105th day of the year in a standard year
