= 205th Brigade =

205th Brigade may refer to:

== China ==
- 205th Motorized Infantry Brigade

== Israel ==
- 205th Armored Brigade

== Russia ==
- 205th Separate Guards Motor Rifle Brigade

== South Korea ==
- 205th Commando Brigade

== United Kingdom ==
- 205th (2nd Welsh Border) Brigade
- 205th Independent Infantry Brigade (Home)

== United States ==
- 205th Infantry Brigade (United States)
- 205th Military Intelligence Brigade

== See also ==
- 205th Division (disambiguation)
- 205th Regiment (disambiguation)
