= 105th Division =

In military terms, 105th Division may refer to:

== Infantry divisions ==
- 105th Division (1st Formation) (People's Republic of China), 1948–1950
- 105th Division (2nd Formation) (People's Republic of China), 1951–1958
- 105th Infantry Division (German Empire)
- 105th Division (Imperial Japanese Army), part of Southern Expeditionary Army Group
- 105th Infantry Division "Rovigo", a unit of the Italian Army during World War II
- 105th Guards Airborne Division, Soviet Union/Uzbekistan, previously the 105th Guards Rifle Division
- 105th Rifle Division, a unit of the Red Army during World War II

== Armoured divisions ==
- 105th Armored Division (North Korea)
- 105th Tank Division (Soviet Union), a unit of the Red Army during World War II

== Aviation divisions ==
- 105th Fighter-Bomber Aviation Division, Soviet Union, later the Russian 105th Guards Mixed Aviation Division

== See also ==
- List of military divisions by number
- 105th Brigade (disambiguation)
- 105th Regiment (disambiguation)
- 105th Squadron (disambiguation)
- 105th (disambiguation)
