= Guo Jian =

Chinese-Australian artist

郭健 Guo Jian
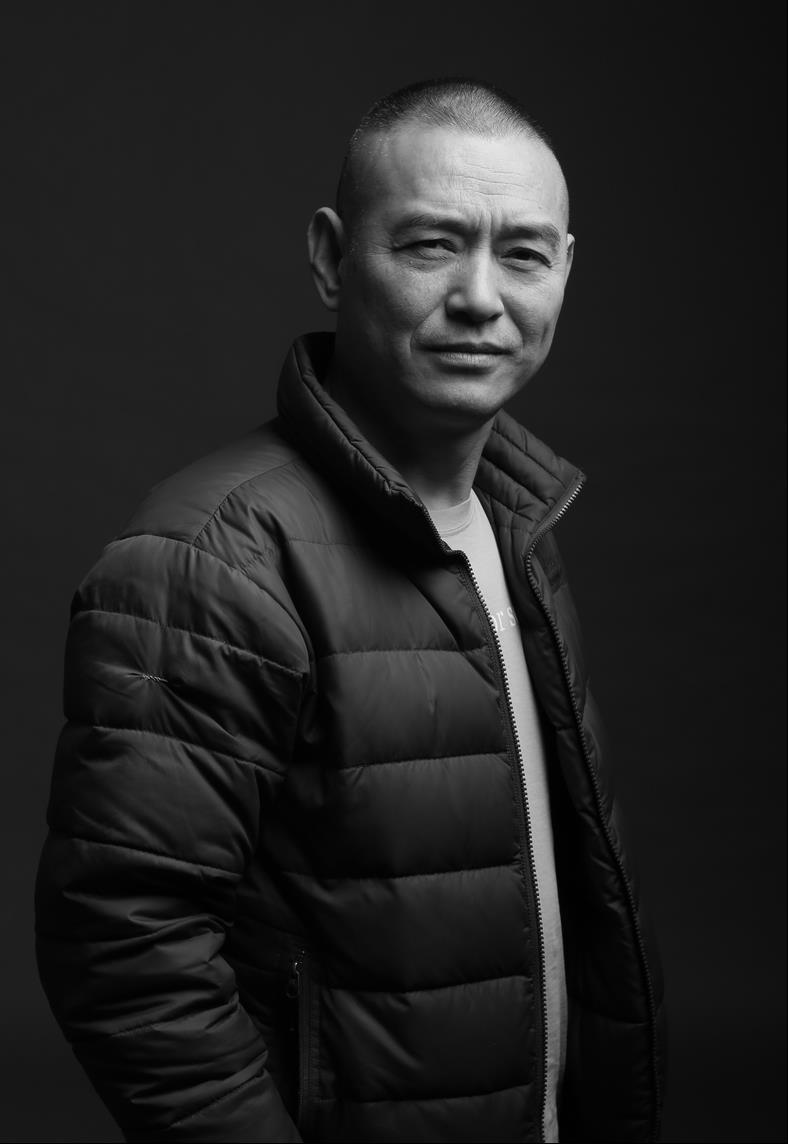
- Born: January 26, 1962 (age 64); Guizhou, China
- Occupations: Artist, painter, sculptor, photographer

Guo Jian (Chinese: 郭健; pinyin: Guō Jiàn; born 26 January 1962) is a Chinese Australian artist.

He is part of a movement of contemporary Chinese artists whose work is characterised as Cynical Realism, which began in the 1990s in Beijing. Born a year after the Great Leap Forward, his art is heavily influenced by the last fifty years of political upheaval and violence in China, a period that included the Cultural Revolution in the 1960s and 70s, the Sino-Vietnamese War in the early 1980s, and the 1989 Tiananmen Square protests and massacre.

A central theme to Guo Jian's art derives from his observations of the application of propaganda and the arts to both motivate soldiers and sway public opinion. His perspective comes from his experiences as a propaganda poster painter in the PLA and propaganda officer in a transport company, then later from the outside looking back in as a student demonstrator during the Tiananmen Square protests in the spring of 1989.

== Art and influences ==
Stylistically, Guo Jian's work falls within the Cynical Realism grouping that has been attached to many contemporary Chinese artists who draw from their experiences over the last four decades in China. Their work is broadly a response to the dominant government driven form of propaganda-laden art known as Socialist Realism. While studying art at Minzu University of China the 85 New Wave Movement emerged, which also had a profound impact on his work.

Guo Jian's art focuses on the use of the female celebrity as a model patriot, a tool to motivate, influence, manipulate and ultimately serve as Ulyssean Siren. His work looks at the commonalities between the purity of the Chinese army's Entertainment Soldier (文艺兵; Pinyin: wényìbīng or 文工团; Pinyin: wéngōngtuán) performers and their Western counterparts. In the book STUDIO, Australian Painters on the Nature of Creativity, author John McDonald noted:

“A poster of two girls in army uniforms posed in front of the Great Wall shows how little Guo Jian actually makes up. His paintings may seem improbable but they are near reflections of Madam Mao’s Model Revolutionary Operas, and the over-the-top style of army propaganda. The message, to boys from the provinces like Guo Jian, was that beautiful girls love a man in uniform. Under capitalism or communism, sex sells.”

He highlights the implied innocence and the underlying eroticism of women used to manipulate and motivate men in uniform and in society as a whole. He delves into the sexualisation of propaganda, heroism, patriotism and persuasion. What first appears as humour is a lament at the use of sex to seduce men to war. Guo's continual references in his paintings to his time in the P.L.A. derive from the traumatic nature of the experience. Gou recalls:

‘I used to have nightmares all the time... Then in the library, I was looking at some pictures of China during the Cultural Revolution and I realized what was triggering these nightmares. Since coming to Australia ten years ago, I’d pushed memories of my years in the Chinese army, and of Tiananmen, out of my mind. But seeing these images triggered memories, and once I stated to use them in my paintings, I stopped having bad dreams.’

== Biography ==
=== Early life ===
Guo Jian 郭健 was born in 1962, in Duyun 都匀市 the capital of Qiannan Buyei and Miao Autonomous Prefecture in the autonomous prefecture of Guizhou province (贵州省) in Southwest China. Guizhou borders Guangxi, Yunnan, Hunan and Sichuan provinces. At 176,000 km^{2} (68,000 sq. ml) Guizhou is approximately the size Florida or two thirds the size of the United Kingdom. One of China's most ethnically diverse provinces; minority groups make up almost 40% of Guizhou's population of 35 million people. Guo Jian's family is from the Buyei 布依族 ethnic minority group.

Growing up during the Cultural Revolution (1966–1976) had a significant impact on Guo Jian's generation. This was a period of China's history characterized as the “Lost Decade” when the country was victim to the internal political power struggles between Mao Zedong and his more moderate opponents. The populace were subjected to a perpetual climate of intense and relentless political indoctrination, struggle sessions and community violence which created a climate of general mistrust even of neighbours and one's own family members. More broadly, millennia of traditions, culture, society and beliefs were abandoned or destroyed as part of the Four Olds campaign.

“The depiction of soldiers has personal and political symbolism for Guo; not only was he a People’s Liberation Army soldier, but, as he has said: ‘My grandmother told me that the People’s Liberation Army had executed my grandfather.... I was shocked.... My father was a soldier. He had to denounce his own father, knowing he’d be killed too if he tried to defend him. And then in 1989, there I was, a former soldier, nearly killed by the P.L.A. myself on Tiananmen Square”

During the 60s and 70s, as most people in China did not have access to radio information, news and government propaganda were disseminated by village big character posters loudspeakers and political posters. Emerging from this period as a young man, Guo Jian joined the PLA to escape from his country town, find his independence, and serve his country. Already an aspiring artist, he hoped to join the PLA and study at one of the army's art colleges.

=== Military Experience (1979-82) ===
In 1978, Guo Jian was approached by the Minzu University of China, the national level university designated for ethnic minorities, but was told to wait one more year to enrol in the art department. Shortly after, PLA recruiters came to Guo Jian's town and told him he could enter the army's art college if he enlisted.

Guo Jian joined the PLA in 1979. One month after enlisting, he was informed that the army's art college entry policies had changed and he could no longer automatically enter the college. As part of Deng Xiaoping's reform and opening up, soldiers now had to undertake a formal entrance application process to enter military college. Guo Jian was initially assigned to the Telegraph Corps, 41st Division, 14th Corps, Yunnan Direction (the West Front) commanded by the Front Headquarter of Kunming Military Region in Kaiyuan 开远city. He was also given responsibility overseeing the armoury, and was promoted to squad leader.

His artistic interests and talents were recognised and he was assigned to a squad of “Entertainment Soldiers” as a propaganda poster artist. During this time, (and even to the present day) the military took visual arts, theatre and performing arts as important tools for political indoctrination, propaganda, to promote and communicate the communist party's ideology as well as boost morale.

In 1982 Guo Jian resigned from the army and returned to his home town and worked as a propaganda officer in a local transportation company. For a period he also worked as a long-haul truck driver.

=== University and after (1985-92) ===
In 1985 Guo Jian was one of just three students accepted into Minzu University of China art department in Beijing, out of 6000 applicants who sat the entrance exam from his province alone. He initially studied traditional Chinese painting, calligraphy, and ink wash painting focussing on figurative art and eventually graduated with a Bachelor of Arts in Chinese painting and literature.

The same year, China began to open up to the world, and with it China's “85 New Wave Movement” of modern art began. For the first time new opportunities arose to see and study modern foreign art trends, as well as foreign political theories and philosophies. The American artist, Robert Rauschenberg held the first officially sanctioned American art show in China in fifty years, held at Beijing's National Art Museum of China. Rauschenberg's installation works inspired many young artists at the time.

In April 1989 the liberal ex-communist party leader Hu Yaobang died. Initially a small group of students began to commemorate his death and called for his legacy to be reassessed. Over the next few months the protesters numbers grew.

Like many students at the time, Guo Jian took part in the student protests and hunger strikes. Facing the soldiers together with the other students, he saw himself on both sides of the divide, both as a student and as the soldier. Guo Jian survived and graduated from university in July 1989, but his participation in the protest movement meant he was banned from being given employment through the formal job placement system for graduates at that time.

Guo Jian was part of the initial group of artists who moved to the outskirts of Beijing to Yuanmingyuan (the site of The Old Summer Palace ruins) and formed the Yuanmingyuan artists’ community. The artists’ move was motivated by a desire to get away from Beijing's post 1989 restrictive environment, while being close to what was at that time a still liberal Beijing University campus. In Yuanmingyuan Guo Jian began his professional painting career.

=== Leaving China (1992) ===
Following the Tiananmen protests and subsequent crackdown of 1989, the art sector and the overall social and political environment in Beijing and across China, remained restrictive and conservative. As a result of pressure from the authorities, Guo Jian decided to leave China. In 1992 he immigrated to Australia. After arriving in Sydney, Guo Jian took up labouring jobs to finance himself and painted at night. His artwork gained the attention of curators and critics and his reputation grew.

In 2006, one of Australia's leading portrait artists, Chinese Australian Shen Jiawei, included a portrait of Guo Jian entitled ‘Guo Jian and Elly’ 1998, in a group exhibition at the Australian Portrait Gallery in Canberra.

=== Back to China (2005) ===
Guo Jian returned to China in 2005 to explore production techniques options for developing his sculpture ‘One World One Dream’ (aka “Dirty Mind”). He resided in the Songzhuang Art Colony, in the eastern suburbs of Beijing.

In 2014 Guo Jian was interviewed on the Australian TV series "Two Men In China" about his art and his sculpture of Tiananmen Square.

Subsequently, in June, 2014 Guo Jian was interviewed by Tom Mitchell, Beijing correspondent for the Financial Times newspaper. As a result of that interview, a full-page story was published in the weekend edition's "Lunch with the FT" section of the Financial Times immediately prior to the June 4th anniversary. The day after the offending article in the globally distributed newspaper hit newsstands, Guo Jian was arrested by Chinese authorities at his studio and detained for several weeks. As news of his arrest and detainment generated international news coverage Guo Jian was eventually deported to Australia for "visa issues".
