= 205th Regiment =

205th Regiment may refer to:

- 205th Artillery Regiment "Bologna", Italy
- 205th Infantry Regiment (United States)
- 205th Pennsylvania Infantry Regiment, a Union Army regiment in the American Civil War

== See also ==
- 205th Division (disambiguation)
