= 2nd Aviation Division =

2nd Aviation Division may refer to:

- 2nd Aviation Division (People's Republic of China), an air formation of the People's Liberation Army Air Force.
- 37th Aviation Division (Socialist Yugoslavia), known from 1945 to 1948 as the 2nd Aviation Division
