= 160th Division =

160th Division may refer to:

- 160th Division (People's Republic of China), 1949
- 160th Infantry Division (People's Republic of China), 1985–1998; previously the 160th Army Division, 1969–1985
- 160th Infantry Division (Wehrmacht), Germany
- 160th Division (Imperial Japanese Army)
- 160th Rifle Division (1940 formation), Soviet Union
- 160th Rifle Division (1941 formation), Soviet Union

== See also ==
- List of military divisions by number
- 160th Brigade (disambiguation)
- 160th Regiment (disambiguation)
- 160th Squadron (disambiguation)
- 160th (disambiguation)
