= 160th =

160th is the ordinal form of the number 160. 160th or One hundred and sixtieth may also refer to:

- A fraction, 1/160, equal to one of 160 equal parts

== Geography ==
- 160th meridian east, a line of longitude
- 160th meridian west, a line of longitude

== Military ==
- 160th Brigade (disambiguation)
- 160th Division (disambiguation)
- 160th Regiment (disambiguation)

== See also ==
- June 9, 160th day of the year in a standard year
