= 76th Reserve Infantry Division (People's Republic of China) =

33rd Division (1949–54) 33rd Infantry Division (1954-60) 33rd Army Division (1960-69) 76th Army Division (1969–85) 76th Motorized Infantry Division (1985-98) 76th Reserve Infantry Division (1998-)
- Active: 1949.3 –
- Country: People's Republic of China
- Branch: People's Liberation Army
- Type: Division
- Role: Infantry
- Part of: Shandong Provincial Military District
- Garrison/HQ: Yantai, Shandong.
- Engagements: Chinese Civil War, Korean War

The 33rd Division was created in March 1949 under the Regulation of the Redesignations of All Organizations and Units of the Army, issued by Central Military Commission on November 1, 1948, basing on the 9th Division, 3rd Column of the Zhongyuan Field Army. Its history can be traced to the 8th Brigade, 3rd Column of Zhongyuan Field Army, formed in October 1945.

The division was then a part of 11th Corps. Under the flag of 33rd, it took part in several major battles during the Chinese Civil War.

In November 1952, the division detached from the Corps and was transferred under the direct control of 3rd Army Group, entered Korea as a part of People's Volunteer Army. During its deployment in Korea the division was attached to 12th Corps, then 60th Corps, taking part in the 1953 Summer Offensive.

In September 1954 the division pulled out from Korea, renamed as 33rd Infantry Division(Chinese: 步兵第33师) and attached to 26th Corps. By then the division was composed of:

- 97th Infantry Regiment;
- 98th Infantry Regiment;
- 99th Infantry Regiment;
- 238th Tank Self-Propelled Artillery Regiment;
- 358th Artillery Regiment.

In April 1960 the division was renamed as the 33rd Army Division(Chinese: 陆军第33师).

In August 1968, 238th Tank Self-Propelled Artillery Regiment was detached and transferred to the newly formed 8th Tank Division as the 30th Tank Regiment.

In December 1969, the division was renamed as the 76th Army Division(Chinese: 陆军第76师), after the former 76th Army Division's renaming and detaching, and all its regiments were re-designated as follow:

- 226th Infantry Regiment (formed 97th);
- 227th Infantry Regiment (formed 98th);
- 228th Infantry Regiment (formed 99th);
- Artillery Regiment (former 358th).

In September 1985, the division was renamed as the 76th Infantry Division(Chinese: 步兵第76师). From 1985 to 1998 the division was maintained as a northern infantry division, category B.

In 1998 the division combined with the Reserve Infantry Division of Yantai and became the 76th Reserve Infantry Division(Chinese: 预备役步兵第76师). The remaining personnel of the division was re-organized into Anti-Aircraft Artillery Brigade, 26th Army.

The Division is now stationing in Yantai, Shandong as a mobilization formation, which composes of:

- 226th Infantry Regiment - Yantai;
- 228th Infantry Regiment - Qixia;
- Artillery Regiment - Penglai;
- Anti-Aircraft Artillery Regiment - Laiyang;
- Engineer Regiment.
