= Reserve Infantry Division of Benxi =

Chinese Military unit

Reserve Division of Benxi (1983-85) Reserve Garrison Division of Benxi (1985-88) Reserve Garrison Division of Benxi (1988-98)
- Active: 1983.10 - 1998.12
- Country: People's Republic of China
- Branch: People's Liberation Army
- Role: Infantry
- Size: Division
- Part of: Liaoning Provincial Military District
- Garrison/HQ: Benxi, Liaoning

The Reserve Division of Benxi (Chinese: 本溪陆军预备役师) was activated in October 1983 in Benxi, Liaoning. The division was then composed of:

- 1st Garrison Regiment - Huanren
- 2nd Garrison Regiment - Benxi
- 3rd Garrison Regiment
- Artillery Regiment - Benxi Steel Group

The division was composed of 14,567 personnel.

In November 1985, it was redesignated as the Reserve Garrison Division of Benxi(Chinese: 本溪陆军预备役守备师).

In March 1988, the division was further redesignated as the Reserve Infantry Division of Benxi(Chinese: 本溪陆军预备役步兵师). The division was then composed of:

- 1st Infantry Regiment - Huanren
- 2nd Infantry Regiment - Benxi
- 3rd Infantry Regiment - Fengcheng
- Artillery Regiment - Benxi Steel Group

On December 1, 1998, the division was merged into the 192nd Infantry Division as the 192nd Reserve Infantry Division of Liaoning Provincial Military District.
