= 105th Regiment =

105th Regiment may refer to:

== American Civil War regiments ==
- 105th Illinois Infantry Regiment
- 105th Indiana Infantry Regiment
- 105th New York Infantry Regiment
- 105th Ohio Infantry Regiment
- 105th Pennsylvania Infantry Regiment

== Other uses ==
- 105th Regiment of Foot (disambiguation), British Army regiments
- 105th Fighter-Bomber Aviation Regiment
- 105th Cavalry Regiment, US Army
- 105th Infantry Regiment (United States)
- 105th Infantry Regiment (PA), Philippine Commonwealth Army
- 105th Regiment Royal Artillery
- 105th Light Anti-Aircraft Regiment, Royal Artillery

== See also ==
- 105th Regiment F.C., a football club
- 105th Brigade (disambiguation)
- 105th Division (disambiguation)
