= Reserve Infantry Division of Siping =

Chinese Military unit

Reserve Division of Siping (1983-85) Reserve Infantry Division of Siping (1985-98)
- Active: 1983.7 - 1998.8
- Country: People's Republic of China
- Branch: People's Liberation Army
- Role: Infantry
- Size: Division
- Part of: Jilin Provincial Military District
- Garrison/HQ: Siping, Jilin

The Reserve Division of Siping (Chinese: 四平陆军预备役师) was activated in July 1983 in Siping, Jilin. The division was then composed of:

- 1st Regiment - Lishu
- 2nd Regiment - Yitong
- 3rd Regiment - Shuangliao
- Artillery Regiment - Huaide, Gongzhuling

In 1985 it was redesignated as the Reserve Infantry Division of Siping(Chinese: 四平陆军预备役步兵师).

In February 1986, the Tank Regiment, Reserve Infantry Division of Siping was activated. 1st Regiment was reconstituted as the 3rd Infantry Regiment. 2nd Regiment was redesignated as the 1st Infantry Regiment. 3rd Regiment was redesignated as the 2nd Infantry Regiment. Since then the division was composed of:

- 1st Infantry Regiment - Yitong
- 2nd Infantry Regiment - Shuangliao
- 3rd Infantry Regiment - Lishu
- Artillery Regiment - Huaide, Gongzhuling
- Tank Regiment - Lishu (Military Unit 82118 from 1986 to 1998; Military Unit 82173 from 1998 to 2000)

On August 7, 1998, the division was merged into the 47th Infantry Division as the 47th Reserve Infantry Division of Jilin Provincial Military District:

- 1st Infantry Regiment and Artillery Regiment, Reserve Infantry Division of Siping merged with the Artillery Regiment, 47th Infantry Division as the new Artillery Regiment, 47th Reserve Infantry Division;
- Tank Regiment, Reserve Infantry Division of Siping retained as the Tank Regiment, 47th Reserve Infantry Division.
