= 205th Division =

205th Division or 205th Infantry Division may refer to:

- 205th Division (1st Formation) (People's Republic of China), 1949–1950
- 205th Division (2nd Formation) (People's Republic of China), 1969–1998
- 205th Infrastructure Construction Engineer Division, People's Republic of China
- 205th Infantry Division (Wehrmacht), Germany
- 205th Coastal Division, Italy
- 205th Division (Imperial Japanese Army)
- 205th Rifle Division, Soviet Union

== See also ==
- List of military divisions by number
- 205th Brigade (disambiguation)
- 205th Regiment (disambiguation)
