= 2nd Reserve Division (People's Republic of China) =

2nd Reserve Division (1955–1958)
- Active: August 1955 – March 1958
- Country: People's Republic of China
- Branch: People's Liberation Army
- Type: Division
- Role: Reserve Infantry
- Part of: Chengdu Military Region
- Garrison/HQ: Chongqing, Sichuan

The 2nd Reserve Division (Chinese: 预备第2师) was formed in August 1955 in Chengdu Military Region. On February 15, 1956, the division moved to Chongqing, Sichuan. As of its activation the division was composed of:

- 4th Reserve Regiment;
- 5th Reserve Regiment;
- 6th Reserve Regiment;
- Artillery Regiment;
- Anti-Aircraft Artillery Regiment;
- Sergeant Training Regiment.

The division was fully manned and equipped. During its short-lived existence the division was focused on the training of officers and sergeants. In March 1958, the division was disbanded.
