= Reserve Infantry Division of Yan'an =

Chinese Military unit

Reserve Division of Yan'an (1984-85)
- Active: 1984.8 - 1985
- Country: People's Republic of China
- Branch: People's Liberation Army
- Role: Infantry
- Size: Division
- Part of: Shaanxi Provincial Military District
- Garrison/HQ: Yan'an, Shaanxi

The Reserve Infantry Division of Yan'an(Chinese: 延安地区陆军预备役师) was a short-lived reserve infantry formation of the People's Liberation Army active between 1984 and 1985.

The division was formally activated in August 1984 in Yan'an, Shaanxi. The division was then composed of:

- 1st Regiment
- 2nd Regiment - Yanchuan
- 3rd Regiment - Zichang
- Artillery Regiment

As of its activation, the division was composed of 13,392 personnel, including 30 active service cadres (officers) and 1595 reserve service cadres.

In 1985 the division was disbanded along with all its subordinates.
