= 4th Armored Brigade (People's Republic of China) =

Brigade of the People's Liberation Army

4th Tank Division (1967–98) 4th Armored Division (1998–2011) 4th Armored Brigade (2011-)
- Country: China
- Type: Armored
- Size: Brigade
- Part of: 16th Army
- Garrison/HQ: Hailong, Jilin

The 4th Tank Division (Chinese: 坦克第4师) was formed on 1 April 1969 from 237th Tank Self-Propelled Artillery Regiment from 32nd Army Division, 252nd Tank Self-Propelled Artillery Regiment from 46th Army Division, 253rd Tank Self-Propelled Artillery Regiment from 47th Army Division and 397th Tank Self-Propelled Artillery Regiment from 192nd Army Division.

As of 19 August 1969, the division was composed of:

- 13th Tank Regiment (former 237th Tank Self-Propelled Artillery Regiment);
- 14th Tank Regiment (former 252nd Tank Self-Propelled Artillery Regiment);
- 15th Tank Regiment (former 253rd Tank Self-Propelled Artillery Regiment);
- 16th Tank Regiment (former 397th Tank Self-Propelled Artillery Regiment).

In 1972 the division retired all its SU-76s and equipped with only T-34s.

In February 1976, 14th Tank Regiment was detached and became Tank Regiment, 16th Army Corps. 16th Tank Regiment was detached and became Tank Regiment, 68th Army Corps. 1st Independent Tank Regiment of Shenyang Military Region was attached and renamed as new 14th Tank Regiment.

From 1980 to 1982 the division re-equipped with 5 battalions of Type-59 and Type-59-1 medium tanks.

On 1 January 1983 the division was put under command of 16th Army Corps. Armored Infantry Regiment and Artillery Regiment activated. By then the division was composed of:

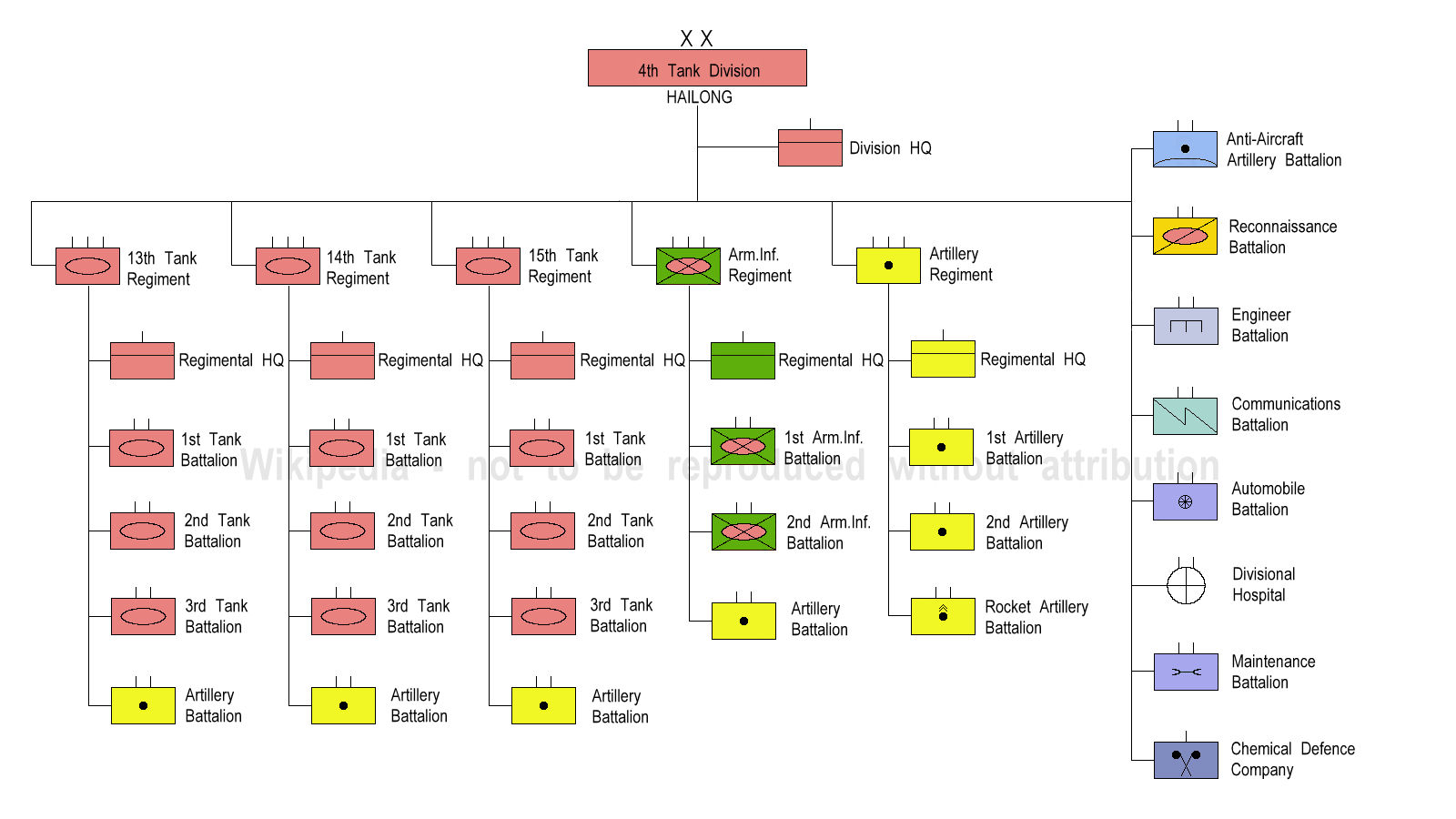
4th Tank Division, Organization from 1984 to 1998.

- 13th Tank Regiment
- 14th Tank Regiment
- 15th Tank Regiment
- Armored Infantry Regiment
- Artillery Regiment

In 1985 the division is attached to 16th Army.

In 1998 the division was renamed 4th Armored Division (Chinese: 装甲第4师). The Armored Infantry Regiment was disbanded and absorbed into tank regiments which became armored regiments. By then the division was composed of:

- 13th Armored Regiment
- 14th Armored Regiment
- 15th Armored Regiment
- Artillery Regiment

In late 2011 the division was split into two: the division itself became 4th Armored Brigade (Chinese: 装甲第4旅), while half of its battalions formed 204th Mechanized Infantry Brigade.
