= 14th Fighter Division =

Chinese military unit

- 第14歼击机师
- Active: February 1951-c.2017
- Country: China
- Allegiance: Chinese Communist Party
- Garrison/HQ: Nanchang, Jiangxi, People's Republic of China

The 14 Fighter Division (Chinese: 第14歼击机师; pinyin: Dì 14 jiānjíjī shī) is a fighter aircraft unit of the Chinese People's Liberation Army Air Force (PLAAF).

It was formed in February 1951 at Beijing Nanyuan Airport from elements of the disbanding 95th Division. Stationed at Nanchang, Jiangxi. The division fought in Korea, as a mixed MiG-9/MiG-15 fighter unit. Started its second combat tour in April 1953 and ceased combat in July 1953. It appears that in September 1992 the 146th Regiment of the disbanding 49th Air Division may have become the 42nd Regiment.

The 14th Fighter Division is composed of:

- 40th Regiment Nanchang/Xiangtang (J11; Su-27UBK)
- 41st Regiment Wuyishan
- 42nd Regiment Zhangshu (J7E)
