= 8th Armored Brigade (People's Republic of China) =

Brigade of the People's Liberation Army

8th Tank Division (1967–98) 8th Armored Division (1998–2011) 8th Armored Brigade (2011–17) 8th Heavy Combined Arms Brigade (2017–)
- Country: People's Republic of China
- Branch: People's Liberation Army Ground Force
- Type: Combined Arms, Armored
- Size: Brigade
- Part of: 78th Group Army
- Garrison/HQ: Weifang, Shandong (before 2017)

The 8th Tank Division (Chinese: 坦克第8师) was formed on September 26, 1967 from Factory No.953, 238th Tank Self-Propelled Artillery Regiment from 33rd Army Division, 281st Tank Self-Propelled Artillery Regiment from 76th Army Division and 330th Tank Self-Propelled Artillery Regiment from 200th Army Division.

As of August 19, 1969, the division was composed of:

- 29th Tank Regiment (former 281st Tank Self-Propelled Artillery Regiment);
- 30th Tank Regiment (former 238th Tank Self-Propelled Artillery Regiment);
- 31st Tank Regiment (former 330th Tank Self-Propelled Artillery Regiment).

In the 1970s the division maintained as a reduced tank division, which consisted of 3 under-equipped tank regiments.

In 1975 31st Tank regiment was fully equipped with 80 Type 59 tank tanks.

In December 1982 the division was put under command of 46th Army Corps, and an Armored Infantry Regiment was formed and attached to the division.

In April 1983 an Artillery Regiment was formed and attached to the division.

In 1985 the division was transferred to 67th Army after 46th Army Corps' disbandment. In the late 1980s the division maintained as an army tank division, and from 1986 it became the only unit equipped with Type 79 main battle tanks.

By then the division was composed of:

- 29th Tank Regiment;
- 30th Tank Regiment;
- 31st Tank Regiment;
- Armored Infantry Regiment;
- Artillery Regiment.

In 1998 the division was transferred to 26th Army after 67th Army's disbandment and renamed the 8th Armored Division (Chinese: 装甲第8师). The Armored Infantry Regiment was disbanded and absorbed into tank regiments which became armored regiments.

By then the division was composed of:

- 29th Armored Regiment;
- 30th Armored Regiment;
- 31st Armored Regiment;
- Artillery Regiment

In late 2011 the division was split into two: the division itself became the 8th Armored Brigade (Chinese: 装甲第8旅), while half of its battalions formed 200th Mechanized Infantry Brigade.

In 2017 the brigade was reorganized as the 8th Heavy Combined Arms Brigade (Chinese: 重型合成第8旅) and transferred to the 78th Group Army as one of its six combined arms brigades.
