= Reserve Infantry Division of Jinzhou =

Chinese Military unit

Reserve Division of Jinzhou (1983-86) Reserve Infantry Division of Jinzhou (1985-99) Reserve Logistic Support Brigade of Liaoning (1999-)
- Active: 1983.3-
- Country: People's Republic of China
- Branch: People's Liberation Army
- Role: Support
- Size: Brigade
- Part of: Liaoning Provincial Military District
- Garrison/HQ: Jinzhou, Liaoning

The formation of a reserve division in Jinzhou was started in March 1982. The order to reconstitute reserve formations was issued by the Central Military Commission of the People's Republic of China in September 1982. The Reserve Division of Jinzhou (Chinese: 锦州陆军预备役师) was formally activated on March 25, 1983, in Jinzhou, Liaoning as the first-ever reserve formation of the People's Liberation Army since 1958. The division was then composed of:

- 1st Regiment - Heishan
- 2nd Regiment - Beizhen
- 3rd Regiment - Jin County
- Artillery Regiment

As of its activation, the division was composed of 13,595 personnel, with 6 100 mm mortars, 6 122 mm howitzers, 4 85 mm guns, 6 107mm MRLs, 4 twin-37 mm AAAs, 4 twin-14.5 mm AA MGs, and 14 tractor vehicles.

On February 1, 1986, the division was redesignated as the Reserve Infantry Division of Jinzhou(Chinese: 锦州陆军预备役步兵师).

In October 1999, the division was reorganized as the Reserve Logistic Support Brigade of Liaoning(Chinese: 辽宁陆军预备役后勤保障旅).
