= Reserve Infantry Division of Dezhou =

Chinese Military unit

Reserve Division of Dezhou (1983-86) Reserve Infantry Division of Dezhou (1985-99) Reserve Logistic Support Brigade of Shandong (1999-)
- Active: 1983.8 -
- Country: People's Republic of China
- Branch: People's Liberation Army
- Role: Support
- Size: Brigade
- Part of: Shandong Provincial Military District
- Garrison/HQ: Dezhou, Shandong

The Reserve Division of Dezhou (Chinese: 德州陆军预备役师) was activated on August 29, 1983, in Dezhou, Shandong. The division was then composed of:

- 1st Regiment - Yucheng County
- 2nd Regiment - Ling County
- 3rd Regiment - Wucheng County
- Artillery Regiment - Pingyuan County

On February 1, 1986, the division was redesignated as the Reserve Infantry Division of Dezhou(Chinese: 德州陆军预备役步兵师).

In October 1999, the division was reorganized as the Reserve Logistic Support Brigade of Shandong(Chinese: 山东陆军预备役后勤保障旅).
