= Reserve Infantry Division of Guizhou Provincial Military District =

Chinese Military unit

8th Reserve Division of Kunming Military Region (1983-84) Reserve Division of Xingyi (1984-99) Reserve Infantry Division of Guizhou Provincial Military District (1999–)
- Active: 1983.5 -
- Country: People's Republic of China
- Branch: People's Liberation Army
- Role: Infantry
- Size: Division
- Part of: Guizhou Military District

The Reserve Infantry Division of Guizhou Provincial Military District (Chinese: 贵州省军区陆军预备役步兵师) is a reserve infantry formation of the People's Liberation Army.

The activation of the 8th Reserve Division of Kunming Military Region(Chinese: 昆明军区预备役第八师) started on May 1, 1983, in Xingyi, Guizhou. The division was composed of the 22nd, 23rd, and 24th regiments and an artillery regiment.

The division was formally activated in August-September 1984 when it was redesignated as the Reserve Division of Xingyi (Chinese: 兴义陆军预备役师). By then the division was then composed of:

- 1st Regiment
- 2nd Regiment
- 3rd Regiment
- Artillery Regiment

In 1999 the division was then redesignated as the Reserve Infantry Division of Guizhou Provincial Military District.

From 2005 the division was composed of:

- 1st Regiment - Zunyi, Guizhou
- 2nd Regiment - Duyun, Guizhou
- 3rd Regiment - Anshun, Guizhou
- Artillery Regiment - Xingyi, Guizhou
- Anti-Aircraft Artillery Regiment - Anshun, Guizhou
