= 105th Brigade =

In military terms, 105th Brigade or 105th Infantry Brigade may refer to:

== Germany ==
- 105th Panzer Brigade

== North Korea ==
- 105th Armored Brigade (North Korea)

== Serbian Krajina ==
- 105th Aviation Brigade, an aviation unit of the Serbian Army of Krajina

== Ukraine ==
- 105th Territorial Defense Brigade, a unit of the Ukrainian Territorial Defense Forces

== United Kingdom ==
- 105th Brigade (United Kingdom), a British Army formation during World War I
- 105th (Howitzer) Brigade, Royal Field Artillery, a British Army unit during World War I
- 105th (Bedfordshire Yeomanry) Brigade, Royal Field Artillery, a British Army unit after World War I

== See also ==
- 105th Division (disambiguation)
- 105th Regiment (disambiguation)
