= Reserve Infantry Division of Yanbian =

Chinese Military unit

Reserve Division of Yanbian (1983-85) Reserve Garrison Division of Yanbian (1985-91) Reserve Infantry Division of Yanbian (1991-98)
- Active: 1983.7 - 1998.9
- Country: People's Republic of China
- Branch: People's Liberation Army
- Role: Infantry
- Size: Division
- Part of: Jilin Provincial Military District
- Garrison/HQ: Yanbian, Jilin

The Reserve Infantry Division of Yanbian(Chinese: 延边陆军预备役步兵师) was a reserve infantry formation of the People's Liberation Army active between 1983 and 1998.

The division, then named as the Reserve Division of Yanbian(Chinese: 延边陆军预备役师) was activated in July 1983 in Yanbian, Jilin. The division was then composed of:

- 1st Regiment - Tumen
- 2nd Regiment - Helong
- 3rd Regiment
- Artillery Regiment - Longjing

As of its activation, the division had 13,361 personnel.

The division was redesignated as the Reserve Garrison Division of Yanbian(Chinese: 延边陆军预备役守备师) in 1985, and was further redesignated as the Reserve Infantry Division of Yanbian in 1991.

In August 1998, the division merged with the 47th Infantry Division as the 47th Reserve Infantry Division of Jilin Provincial Military District.
