= Reserve Infantry Division of Hainan Provincial Military District =

Reserve Infantry Division of Hainan Provincial Military District (1993–)
- Active: 1993.11 -
- Country: People's Republic of China
- Branch: People's Liberation Army
- Role: Infantry
- Size: Division
- Part of: Hainan Provincial Military District

The Reserve Infantry Division of Hainan Provincial Military District (Chinese: 海南省军区陆军预备役步兵师) is a reserve infantry formation of the People's Liberation Army.

The division was activated in November 1993.

Since 2005 the division was composed of:

- 1st Regiment - Haikou, Hainan;
- 2nd Regiment - Haikou, Hainan;
- Artillery Regiment - Danzhou, Hainan;
- 1st Anti-Aircraft Artillery Regiment;
- 2nd Anti-Aircraft Artillery Regiment - Haikou, Hainan.
