= Reserve Infantry Division of Weinan =

Chinese Military unit

Reserve Division of Weinan (1983–85)
- Active: 1983.12 - 1985.10
- Country: People's Republic of China
- Branch: People's Liberation Army
- Role: Infantry
- Size: Division
- Part of: Shaanxi Provincial Military District
- Garrison/HQ: Weinan, Shaanxi

The Reserve Infantry Division of Weinan (Chinese: 渭南陆军预备役师) was a short-lived reserve infantry formation of the People's Liberation Army active between 1983 and 1985.

The division was formally activated in December 1983 in Weinan, Shaanxi. The division was then composed of:

- 1st Regiment
- 2nd Regiment
- 3rd Regiment
- Artillery Regiment - Dali County

In October 1985 the division was disbanded along with all its subordinates.
