= Reserve Infantry Division of Jiangxi Provincial Military District =

Reserve Division of Nanchang (1984-85) Reserve Infantry Division of Nanchang (1985-99) Reserve Infantry Division of Jiangxi (1999–)
- Active: 1984.6 -
- Country: People's Republic of China
- Branch: People's Liberation Army
- Role: Infantry
- Size: Division
- Part of: Jiangxi Provincial Military District
- Garrison/HQ: Nanchang, Jiangxi

The Reserve Infantry Division of Jiangxi(Chinese: 江西陆军预备役步兵师) is a reserve infantry formation of the People's Liberation Army.

The Reserve Division of Nanchang(Chinese: 南昌陆军预备役师) was activated in June 1984 at Nanchang, Jiangxi. The division was then composed of 3 infantry regiments and 1 artillery regiment:

- 1st Infantry Regiment - Fengcheng, Jiangxi
- 2nd Infantry Regiment - Jinxian, Jiangxi
- 3rd Infantry Regiment - Xinjian, Jiangxi
- Artillery Regiment - Nanchang, Jiangxi

In November 1985, the division was redesignated as the Reserve Infantry Division of Nanchang(Chinese: 南昌陆军预备役步兵师).

In September 1998, the Anti-Aircraft Artillery Regiment, Reserve Infantry Division of Nanchang was activated from the artillery regiment.

In September 1999, the division was redesignated as the Reserve Infantry Division of Jiangxi.

In 2004, the Artillery Regiment, Reserve Infantry Division of Jiangxi was reactivated.

By 2020 the division was composed of:

- 1st Infantry Regiment - Yichun, Jiangxi
- 2nd Infantry Regiment - Ganzhou, Jiangxi
- 3rd Infantry Regiment - Jiujiang, Jiangxi
- Artillery Regiment - Ji'an, Jiangxi
- Anti-Aircraft Artillery Regiment - Nanchang, Jiangxi.
