= 192nd Infantry Division (People's Republic of China) =

Chinese military unit

192nd Division (1949–53) 192nd Infantry Division (1953-60) 192nd Army Division (1960–85) 192nd Infantry Division (1985-98) 192nd Reserve Infantry Division (1998-)
- Active: 1949.2 -
- Country: People's Republic of China
- Branch: People's Liberation Army, People's Volunteer Army
- Type: Division
- Role: Reserve Infantry
- Part of: Liaoning Provincial Military District
- Garrison/HQ: Benxi, Liaoning province
- Engagements: Chinese Civil War, Korean War, Sino-Vietnamese War

The 192nd Division (Chinese: 第192师) was created in February 1949 under the Regulation of the Redesignations of All Organizations and Units of the Army, issued by Central Military Commission on November 1, 1948, basing on the 12th Brigade, 4th Column of Huabei Military Region. Its history could be traced back to 2nd Independent Brigade of Jinchaji Military Region, formed in March 1946.

The division was a part of 64th Corps. Under the flag of 192nd division it took part in the Chinese Civil War, especially the Pingjin Campaign.

The division was composed of 574th, 575th and 576th Infantry Regiments. In December 1950 Artillery Regiment, 192nd Division was activated, and redesignated as 572nd Artillery Regiment in 1953.

In January 1951 the division converted to Soviet-built small arms. After soon the division moved into Korea as a part of People's Volunteer Army in February 1951.

In August 1953, the division pulled out of Korea and renamed as 192nd Infantry Division (Chinese: 步兵第192师). The division stationed in Benxi, Liaoning province since then.

In May 1954, 397th Tank Self-Propelled Artillery Regiment was activated. The division was then composed of:

- 574th Infantry Regiment;
- 575th Infantry Regiment;
- 576th Infantry Regiment;
- 572nd Artillery Regiment;
- 397th Tank Self-Propelled Artillery Regiment.

In February 1955, the division, along with the rest of 64th Corps moved to Port Arthur to receive equipment left by the withdrawing Soviet Union. The division received equipment left by 19th Guards Rifle Division, and then stationed in Lüshunkou District.

In April 1960 the division was renamed as 192nd Army Division (Chinese: 陆军第192师). In June 1962, the division was designated as a "small" division (northern, category B). 574th Infantry Regiment maintained as a "big" regiment, while 575th and 576th were reduced to "small" regiments.

In June 1963 the division moved to Benxi, Liaoning again.

In September 1968, 397th Tank Self-Propelled Artillery Regiment detached from the division and was transferred to 4th Tank Division as 16th Tank Regiment.

In late 1969, 572nd Artillery Regiment was renamed as Artillery Regiment, 192nd Army Division. The division was then composed of:

- 574th Infantry Regiment;
- 575th Infantry Regiment;
- 576th Infantry Regiment;
- Artillery Regiment.

In the 1970s the division maintained as a category B unit. From late December 1978 to early March 1979, the division was fully mobilized as a category A unit following the outbreak of Sino-Vietnamese War.

In September 1985, the division was renamed as 192nd Infantry Division (Chinese: 步兵第192师) again. From 1985 to 1998 the division maintained as a northern infantry division, category B. The 575th and 577th Regiments were converted to training unit until 1989, when they were further converted to combat units.

In 1987, Reconnaissance Company, 192nd Infantry Division were deployed to Sino-Vietnamese border as 4th Company, 15th Reconnaissance Group. In February 1989, the company received the honorific title of "Heroic Reconnaissance Company" issued by the Central Military Commission.

In July 1998, after the disbandment of 64th Army, the division was transferred to Liaoning Provincial Military District's control. Soon in October the division absorbed the former Reserve Infantry Division of Benxi and Reserve Infantry Division of Fuxin and reorganized as 192nd Reserve Infantry Division(Chinese: 预备役步兵第192师).
