= Reserve Infantry Division of Nenjiang =

Chinese Military unit

Reserve Division of Nenjiang (1983-85)
- Active: 1983.5 - 1985?
- Country: People's Republic of China
- Branch: People's Liberation Army
- Role: Infantry
- Size: Division
- Part of: Heilongjiang Provincial Military District
- Garrison/HQ: Nenjiang, Heilongjiang

The Reserve Division of Nenjiang (Chinese: 嫩江陆军预备役师) was a short-lived reserve infantry formation of the People's Liberation Army active between 1984 and 1985.

The division was activated in March 1983 in Nenjiang, Heilongjiang. By then the division was then composed of:

- 1st Regiment
- 2nd Regiment - Keshan
- 3rd Regiment
- Artillery Regiment - Baiquan

The division was likely disbanded in 1985.
