= 205th Infrastructure Construction Engineer Division =

205th Infrastructure Construction Engineer Division (1971-78) 28th Detachment of Infrastructure Construction Engineer （1978-84）
- Active: 1971.11 - 1984.1
- Country: People's Republic of China
- Branch: People's Liberation Army
- Type: Division
- Role: Construction Engineer
- Part of: Chengdu Military Region
- Garrison/HQ: Guanghan, Sichuan province

205th Infrastructure Construction Engineer Division (Chinese: 基本建设工程兵第205师) was activated in November 1971, from all uranium prospecting units in Guangdong under the command of Ministry of Second Machine Industry. The division was composed of 3 regiments:

- 640th Regiment, in Xichang, Sichuan;
- 641st Regiment, in Deyang, Sichuan;
- 642nd Regiment, in Da County, Sichuan.

The division was under the command of Chengdu Military Region. Headquartered in Guanghan, the division acted as a Uranium-related geologic survey unit in Southwestern China.

In July 1975, the division was transferred to Infrastructure Construction Engineer Office, Ministry of Second Machine Industry's control.

In May 1978, the division was renamed as 28th Detachment of Infrastructure Construction Engineer(Chinese: 基建工程兵第28支队). All its regiments were renamed as follow:

- 640th Regiment was renamed as 271st Group;
- 641st Regiment was renamed as 272nd Group;
- 642nd Regiment was renamed as 273rd Group.

In October 1978, the detachment was transferred to Second Machine Industrial Command, Infrastructure Construction Engineer's control.

On January 1, 1984, the detachment was demobilized and reorganized as Southwestern Geologic Survey Bureau of the Ministry of Nuclear Industry.
