= Reserve Infantry Division of Xinzhou =

Reserve Division of Xinzhou (1985) Reserve Infantry Division of Xinzhou(1985–99)
- Active: 1985.7 -
- Country: People's Republic of China
- Branch: People's Liberation Army
- Role: Infantry
- Size: Division
- Part of: Shanxi Provincial Military District
- Garrison/HQ: Xinzhou, Shanxi

The Reserve Division of Xinzhou(Chinese: 忻州陆军预备役师) was activated in July 1985, at Xinzhou, Shanxi. The division was composed of 3 infantry regiments and 1 artillery regiment. In November 1985 the division was redesignated as the Reserve Infantry Division of Xinzhou(Chinese: 忻州陆军预备役步兵师).

The division was then composed of:

- 1st Infantry Regiment
- 2nd Infantry Regiment
- 3rd Infantry Regiment - Wutai County
- Artillery Regiment

The division was disbanded in 1999.
