= 105th Infantry Division (German Empire) =

105th Infantry Division (105. Infanterie-Division)
- Active: 1915–19
- Country: German Empire
- Branch: Army
- Type: Infantry
- Size: Approx. 12,500
- Engagements: World War I: Gorlice–Tarnów Offensive; Serbian Campaign; Macedonian front; Brusilov Offensive; Battle of Cambrai (1917); German spring offensive; First Battle of the Somme (1918); Meuse-Argonne Offensive

The 105th Infantry Division (105. Infanterie-Division) was a unit of the Imperial German Army in World War I. The division was formed on May 5, 1915, and organized over the next few weeks. It was part of a wave of new infantry divisions formed in the spring of 1915. The division was disbanded in 1919 during the demobilization of the German Army after World War I.

The division was formed primarily from the excess infantry regiments of existing divisions which were being triangularized. The division's 209th Infantry Brigade was formerly the 69th Infantry Brigade of the 36th Infantry Division, and came to the division with the 129th Infantry Regiment. The 21st Infantry Regiment came from the 35th Infantry Division and the 122nd Füsilier Regiment came from the 26th Infantry Division. The 21st and 129th Infantry Regiments were raised in West Prussia. The 122nd Füsilier Regiment was from the Kingdom of Württemberg, and was later replaced by the 400th Infantry Regiment, raised primarily in the Rhineland.

== Combat chronicle ==
The 105th Infantry Division initially served on the Eastern Front, seeing its first action in the Gorlice-Tarnów Offensive. It was then transferred south to participate in the Serbian Campaign. It advanced to the Greek border and remained on the Macedonian front until June 1916. Elements of the division were detached and sent to Bulgaria during this period. The division was sent back to Galicia in June in response to the Russian Brusilov Offensive. In September, the division went to Latvia, and fought near Riga and Jakobstadt (now Jēkabpils). At the end of October 1917, the division was sent to the Western Front, entering the line in the German "Siegfried" position. It fought in the tank Battle of Cambrai in November 1917 and in the German counterattack in December. In April 1918, the division participated in the German spring offensive, fighting in the First Battle of the Somme (1918), also known as the Second Battle of the Somme (to distinguish it from the 1916 battle). It remained in the Somme salient and fought against various Allied counteroffensives. The division moved to the St. Mihiel salient in September and then occupied the line in the Woëvre region. In October, it met the Allied Meuse-Argonne Offensive. The division remained in the line until the end of the war. Allied intelligence rated the division as third class.

== Order of battle on formation ==
The 105th Infantry Division was formed as a triangular division. The order of battle of the division on May 15, 1915, was as follows:

- 209. Infanterie-Brigade
  - Infanterie-Regiment von Borcke (4. Pommersches) Nr. 21
  - Füsilier-Regiment Kaiser Franz Josef von Österreich, König von Ungarn (4. Württembergisches) Nr.122
  - 3. Westpreußisches Infanterie-Regiment Nr. 129
- 3.Eskadron/Reserve-Husaren-Regiment Nr. 5
- 5.Eskadron/Jäger-Regiment zu Pferde Nr. 4
- Feldartillerie-Regiment Nr. 209
- Fußartillerie-Batterie Nr. 105
- Pionier-Kompanie Nr. 209

== Late-war order of battle ==
The division underwent relatively few organizational changes over the course of the war. The 122nd Füsilier Regiment, a Württemberg unit, was replaced by the Prussian 400th Infantry Regiment. Cavalry was reduced, artillery and signals commands were formed, and combat engineer support was expanded to a full pioneer battalion. The order of battle on June 16, 1918, was as follows:

- 209.Infanterie-Brigade
  - Infanterie-Regiment von Borcke (4. Pommersches) Nr. 21
  - 3. Westpreußisches Infanterie-Regiment Nr. 129
  - Infanterie-Regiment Nr. 400
- 5.Eskadron/Jäger-Regiment zu Pferde Nr. 4
- Artillerie-Kommandeur 105
  - Feldartillerie-Regiment Nr. 209
  - I.Bataillon/1. Westpreußisches Fußartillerie-Regiment Nr. 11
- Pionier-Bataillon Nr. 105
  - 1.Kompanie/Samländisches (Festungs-) Pionier-Bataillon Nr. 18
  - Pionier-Kompanie Nr. 209
  - Minenwerfer-Kompanie Nr. 105
- Divisions-Nachrichten-Kommandeur 105
