= 208th Division (People's Republic of China) =

165th Division (1948-49) 208th Division (1949-50)
- Active: 1948.11 - 1950.11
- Country: People's Republic of China
- Branch: People's Liberation Army
- Type: Division
- Role: Infantry
- Engagements: Chinese Civil War

The 165th Division (Chinese: 第165师) was created in November 1948 under the Regulation of the Redesignations of All Organizations and Units of the Army, issued by Central Military Commission on November 1, 1948, basing on the 3rd Independent Division of Northeastern People's Liberation Army, formed in April 1948.

The division was under direct control of the Field Army.

In March 1949 the division was renamed as 208th Division (Chinese: 第208师) and was transferred to Pingjin Garrison Command.

The division was then composed of:

- 622nd Infantry Regiment;
- 623rd Infantry Regiment;
- 624th Infantry Regiment.

In November 1950, the division was inactivated and parts were re-organized as 2nd Aviation Division of the PLAAF.
