= Benxi Steel Group =

Chinese steel producer

- Type: State-owned enterprise
- Industry: Iron and steel manufacturing
- Founded: 1905 (Benxi Coal Mine); 1996 (Benxi Iron and Steel Ltd.); 2010 (Benxi Steel)
- Headquarters: Benxi, China
- Owner: Liaoning SASAC (80%); Liaoning Social Security Fund (20%)
- Parent: Liaoning SASAC
- Subsidiaries: Benxi Iron and Steel (100%); Bengang Steel Plates (77.10%); Beiying Iron and Steel (83.66%)
- Website: www.bxsteel.com
- Footnotes in a consolidated basis

Benxi Steel Group Corp., Ltd.
- Simplified Chinese: 本钢集团有限公司
- Traditional Chinese: 本鋼集團有限公司
Transcriptions
Standard Mandarin
- Hanyu Pinyin: Běngāng jítuán yǒuxiàn gōngsī

Alternative Chinese name
- Simplified Chinese: 本钢集团
- Traditional Chinese: 本鋼集團
- Literal meaning: Bengang Group
Transcriptions
Standard Mandarin
- Hanyu Pinyin: Běngāng jítuán

Benxi Iron and Steel
- Simplified Chinese: 本溪钢铁
- Traditional Chinese: 本溪鋼鐵
Transcriptions

Benxi Steel Group Corp., Ltd. known as Benxi Steel Group (or Bengang in China) is a Chinese holding company based in Benxi, Liaoning Province, for two steel making group.

The company was formed in 2010 as the holding company for Benxi Iron and Steel (Group) Co., Ltd. (Chinese: 本溪钢铁(集团)有限责任公司) and Beitai Iron and Steel (Group) Co., Ltd. (Chinese: 北台钢铁(集团)有限责任公司), the latter now known as Benxi Beiying Iron and Steel (Group) Co., Ltd. (Chinese: 本溪北营钢铁(集团)股份有限公司).

According to World Steel Association (Chinese companies data was provided by China Iron and Steel Association), the corporation was ranked the 21st in 2015 the world ranking by production volume.

It was owned by State-owned Assets Supervision and Administration Commission (SASAC) of Liaoning Provincial People's Government.

== History ==
In 1905, after the Russo-Japanese War, Liaoning fall under the sphere of influence of Japan. Japanese Okura Kihachiro opened a coal mine in Benxi. After the protest of Qing Government, it became a Sino-Japanese joint venture in 1910 (as Chinese: 本溪湖商辦煤礦業有限公司; lit. 'Benxi Lake Commercial Coal Mining Company Limited'). In the next year the company added "Iron" in the denomination (as Chinese: 本溪湖煤鐵有限公司; lit. 'Benxi Lake Coal and Iron Company Limited'). After the Mukden Incident, the company was under sole Japanese control until the end of World War II. During Chinese Civil War, in 1948 the company and Liaoning fall under Chinese Communist Party controls. In 1953, the coal mine was separated from the company as Benxi Mining Bureau. (now part of Shenyang Coal Industry) The steel refinery was also modified under the aid of Soviet Union as 1 of 156 important construction projects of the First Five-year plan of China. It was one of the 512 important state-owned enterprises in 1997 (1 of 47 iron and steel industry).

In 2005 a merger between Benxi Iron and Steel and Anshan Iron & Steel Group Corporation was announced but never materialized. In 2010 a new holding company was formed to take over "Benxi Iron and Steel" and "Beitai Iron and Steel", located in Beitai, a town in Pingshan District, Benxi. The latter was owned by SASAC of Benxi City, but was transferred to Liaoning SASAC in order to finalize the merger. In August 2021, Bengang began a merger with Ansteel Group which, once completed, will create the third largest metal producer in the world.

During the disaster of Air France flight AF447 in 2009, Benxi Iron and Steel Company lost 6 employees, including the executive Chen Chiping, the wife of Liaoning's vice provincial governor Liu Guoqiang.

== Subsidiaries ==
Bengang Steel Plates, a subsidiary of Benxi Iron and Steel, is a listed company in Shenzhen Stock Exchange (SZSE: 000761). As of 7 November 2016, Bengang Steel Plates was a constituent of SZSE 1000 Index (top 1000 companies by capitalization) and SZSE 700 Sub-Index (the 301st to 1,000th companies by capitalization), but not a constituent of SZSE Component Index (top 500 companies by capitalization), making the listed company was ranked between the 501st to 1000th by free float adjusted market capitalization.
