= 30th Infantry Division (2nd Formation) (People's Republic of China) =

30th Army Division (1968–79) 6th Garrison Division of Beijing Military Region (1979–92) 30th Infantry Brigade (1992–98) 30th Reserve Infantry Division (1998-)
- Active: 1968.7 - Present
- Country: People's Republic of China
- Branch: People's Liberation Army
- Type: Division
- Role: Infantry
- Part of: Inner Mongolian Military District
- Garrison/HQ: Jining, Inner Mongolia

The 30th Reserve Infantry Division is a military reserve formation of the People's Liberation Army of the People's Republic of China.

The 30th Army Division(Chinese: 陆军第30师)(2nd Formation) was formed in July 1968 in Huhhot, Inner Mongolia from 1st, 2nd, 3rd and 4th Independent Infantry Regiment of Inner Mongolian Military District.

In December 1969 all regiments of the division were re-designated as follows:

- 88th Infantry Regiment;
- 89th Infantry Regiment;
- 90th Infantry Regiment;
- Artillery Regiment.

In January 1979, for the preparation of presumed Soviet aggressive actions following the Sino-Vietnamese War, the division was re-organized and renamed as the 6th Garrison Division of Beijing Military Region(Chinese: 北京军区守备第6师).

In 1985 the division absorbed 2 regiments from the disbanding 30th Army Division (3rd Formation). By then the division was composed of:

- 21st Garrison Regiment;
- 22nd Garrison Regiment;
- 23rd Garrison Regiment;
- 24th Garrison Regiment;
- 31st Garrison Regiment;
- Artillery Regiment.

In 1992, the 6th Garrison Division was reduced and renamed as 30th Infantry Brigade(Chinese: 步兵第30旅), the first infantry brigade organized under Chinese military reform.

In late 1998, the brigade was combined with the Reserve Infantry Division of Hohhot and became the 30th Reserve Infantry Division(Chinese: 预备役步兵第30师) of Inner Mongolian Military District.

The division was then composed of:

- 88th Infantry Regiment
- 89th Infantry Regiment
- 90th Infantry Regiment
- Artillery Regiment
- Anti-Aircraft Artillery Regiment
