= Reserve Artillery Division of Shandong Provincial Military District =

Reserve Division of Chu County (1987–99) Reserve Infantry Division of Anhui (1999–)
- Active: 1987.7 -
- Country: People's Republic of China
- Branch: People's Liberation Army
- Role: Infantry
- Size: Division
- Part of: Shandong Provincial Military District
- Garrison/HQ: Jining, Shandong

The Reserve Artillery Division of Shandong Provincial Military District(Chinese: 山东省军区陆军预备役炮兵师) is a reserve artillery formation of the People's Liberation Army.

The Reserve Artillery Division of Jining(Chinese: 济宁陆军预备役炮兵师) was activated in July 1987 at Jining, Shandong.

In 1999 the division was reorganized as the Reserve Artillery Division of Shandong Provincial Military District.

The division was now composed of:

- 1st Artillery Regiment - Qingdao, Shandong
- 2nd Artillery Regiment - Jimo, Shandong
- 3rd Artillery Regiment - Jiaozhou, Shandong
- 4th Artillery Regiment - Rongcheng, Shandong
