= Reserve Infantry Division of Fuxin =

Chinese Military unit

Reserve Division of Fuxin (1983-85) Reserve Garrison Division of Fuxin (1985-88) Reserve Infantry Division of Fuxin (1988-98)
- Active: 1983.12 - 1998.12
- Country: People's Republic of China
- Branch: People's Liberation Army
- Role: Infantry
- Size: Division
- Part of: Liaoning Provincial Military District
- Garrison/HQ: Fuxin, Liaoning

The Reserve Division of Fuxin (Chinese: 阜新陆军预备役师) was activated in December 1983 in Fuxin, Liaoning. The division was then composed of:

- 1st Garrison Regiment - Fuxin County
- 2nd Garrison Regiment - Xihe district, Fuxin
- 3rd Garrison Regiment - Zhangwu
- Artillery Regiment - Taiping district, Fuxin
- Tank Regiment - Haihe district, Fuxin
- Special Troops Regiment - Chaoyang

In November 1985 it was redesignated as the Reserve Garrison Division of Fuxin(Chinese: 阜新陆军预备役守备师).

The division was composed of 9,026 personnel. Apart from small arms, the division possessed 4 85 mm guns, 4 100 mm mortars, 4 122 mm howitzers, 4 107 mm MRLs, 4 twin-37 mm AAA guns, 4 14.5 mm AAMGs, and 11 tractor vehicles. While organized with a tank regiment, the division virtually had no tanks.

In late 1986, the 2nd Garrison Regiment was reconfigured as the Engineer Battalion, Reserve Garrison Division of Fuxin.

On March 18, 1988, the division was further redesignated as the Reserve Infantry Division of Fuxin(Chinese: 阜新陆军预备役步兵师). The division was then composed of:

- 1st Infantry Regiment
- 2nd Infantry Regiment
- 3rd Infantry Regiment
- Artillery Regiment
- Tank Regiment
- Special Troops Regiment

On December 1, 1998, the division was merged into the 192nd Infantry Division as the 192nd Reserve Infantry Division of Liaoning Provincial Military District.
