= Reserve Infantry Division of Yantai =

Reserve Division of Yantai (1984-85) Reserve Infantry Division of Yantai(1985–98)
- Active: 1984.6 - 1998.10
- Country: People's Republic of China
- Branch: People's Liberation Army
- Role: Infantry
- Size: Division
- Part of: Shandong Provincial Military District
- Garrison/HQ: Yantai, Shandong

The Reserve Infantry Division of Yantai(Chinese: 烟台陆军预备役步兵师) was a reserve infantry formation of the People's Liberation Army.

The formation of the Reserve Division of Yantai(Chinese: 烟台陆军预备役师) started in March 1984, at Yantai, Shandong. The division was formally activated on June 14, 1984. The division was composed of 3 infantry regiments and 1 artillery regiment. In November 1985 the division was redesignated as the Reserve Infantry Division of Yantai.

The division was then composed of:

- 1st Infantry Regiment - Zhaoyuan
- 2nd Infantry Regiment - Muping
- 3rd Infantry Regiment
- Artillery Regiment

In October 1998 the division merged with the 76th Infantry Division as the 76th Reserve Infantry Division of Shandong.
