= 2nd Reserve Infantry Division of Beijing =

2nd Reserve Infantry Division of Beijing (1985-1998)
- Active: 1985.2 - 1998
- Country: People's Republic of China
- Branch: People's Liberation Army
- Role: Infantry
- Size: Division
- Part of: Beijing Guard District
- Garrison/HQ: Changxindian - Fengtai, Beijing

The 2nd Reserve Infantry Division of Beijing (Chinese: 北京陆军预备役步兵第2师) was a reserve infantry formation of the People's Liberation Army.

The formation of the division started on July 15, 1983. The division was formally activated on February 1, 1985.

The division was then composed of:

- 4th Regiment - Changping, Beijing
- 5th Regiment - Yanqing, Beijing
- 6th Regiment - Fangshan, Beijing
- Artillery Regiment
- Tank Regiment - Fengtai, Beijing

However, the Tank Regiment was deactivated on October 4, 1984, before the activation of the division.

The division was disbanded in 1998. The division, combined with the 1st Reserve Infantry Division of Beijing, reorganized into the Reserve Antiaircraft Artillery Division of Beijing Guard District.
