= 106th Division (People's Republic of China) =

106th Division (1950–52) 1st Build Construction Division (1952-55)
- Active: 1950.2 - 1955.4
- Country: People's Republic of China
- Branch: People's Liberation Army
- Type: Division
- Role: Infantry
- Part of: 36th Corps
- Engagements: Chinese Civil War, Korean War

The 106th Division (Chinese: 第106师) was created in February 1950 under the Regulation of the Redesignations of All Organizations and Units of the Army, issued by Central Military Commission on November 1, 1948, basing on the 258th Division, 111th Corps of Republic of China Army defected on September 19, 1949, during the Chinese Civil War.

The division was part of 36th Corps.

In April 1951 the division absorbed 111th Division and a regiment from Cavalry Brigade, 36th Corps as preparation before entering Korea.

In September 1951 the division moved into Korea as a part of the People's Volunteer Army. During its deployment to Korea the division was in charge of rear guards mission and the construction of Wonli Airfield.

In December the division returned from Korea.

In February 1952 the division was re-organized as 1st Build Construction Division(Chinese: 建筑工程第1师).

In April 1955 the division was demobilized.
