= 47th Infantry Division (People's Republic of China) =

47th Division (1949–53) 47th Infantry Division (1953–60) 47th Army Division (1960–85) 47th Infantry Division (1985–98) 47th Reserve Infantry Division (1998-)
- Founded: February 1949
- Country: China
- Allegiance: Chinese Communist Party
- Branch: People's Liberation Army; People's Volunteer Army
- Type: Division
- Role: Infantry
- Part of: Jilin Provincial Military District
- Garrison/HQ: Siping, Jilin province
- Engagements: Chinese Civil War, Korean War

The 47th Reserve Infantry Division is a military reserve formation of the People's Liberation Army of the People's Republic of China.

The 47th Division (Chinese: 第47师) was created in February 1949 under the Regulation of the Redesignations of All Organizations and Units of the Army, issued by Central Military Commission on November 1, 1948, basing on the 2nd Brigade, 1st Column of Zhongyuan Field Army. Its history can be traced to the 2nd Brigade, 1st Column of Jinjiluyu Military Region formed on September 22, 1945. Under the command of the 16th Corps, it took part in many major battles during the Chinese Civil War.

The division was a part of 16th Corps. The division took part in the Chinese Civil War.In September 1951 Tank Regiment (later renamed as 253rd Tank Self-Propelled Artillery Regiment) was activated and attached to the division.In December 1952 the division entered Korea as a part of People's Volunteer Army. In 1955 the division was renamed as 47th Infantry Division(Chinese: 步兵第47师). On April 18, 1958, the division pulled out from Korea and was stationed in Siping, Jilin province.

In April 1960 the division was renamed as 47th Army Division(Chinese: 陆军第47师). By then the division was composed of:

- 139th Infantry Regiment;
- 140th Infantry Regiment;
- 141st Infantry Regiment;
- 253rd Tank Self-Propelled Artillery Regiment;
- Artillery Regiment.

In April 1969 253rd Tank Self-Propelled Artillery Regiment was detached and transferred to 4th Tank Division as 15th Tank Regiment.

In 1985 the division was renamed as 47th Infantry Division(Chinese: 步兵第47师). Since then the division was composed of:

- 139th Infantry Regiment;
- 140th Infantry Regiment;
- 141st Infantry Regiment;
- Artillery Regiment.

From 1985 to 1998 the division was maintained as a Northern Infantry Division, Category 'B'.

In 1998 the division was transferred to Army Reserve status, merging with the Reserve Infantry Division of Yanbian and became the 47th Reserve Infantry Division(Chinese: 预备役步兵第47师) of the Army Reserve of Jilin Provincial Military District.
