= 105th Regiment of Foot =

Four regiments of the British Army have been numbered the 105th Regiment of Foot:

- 105th Regiment of Foot (Queen's Own Royal Regiment of Highlanders), raised in 1760, disbanded 1763
- 105th Regiment of Foot, loyalist regiment raised in America and placed on the British establishment as the 105th Foot in 1782; disbanded 1784
- 105th Regiment of Foot (1794), raised in 1794 and disbanded in 1795
- 105th Regiment of Foot (Madras Light Infantry), raised by the East India Company and placed on the British establishment as the 105th Foot in 1862
