= Reserve Infantry Division of Baoji =

Chinese Military unit

Reserve Division of Baoji (1984-85)
- Active: 1984 - 1985
- Country: People's Republic of China
- Branch: People's Liberation Army
- Role: Infantry
- Size: Division
- Part of: Shaanxi Provincial Military District
- Garrison/HQ: Baoji, Shaanxi

The Reserve Division of Baoji(Chinese: 宝鸡陆军预备役师) was a short-lived reserve infantry formation of the People's Liberation Army active between 1984 and 1985.

The division was activated in September 1984 in Baoji, Shaanxi. By then the division was then composed of:

- 1st Regiment - Fengxiang
- 2nd Regiment
- 3rd Regiment - Fufeng
- Artillery Regiment - Baoji County

The division failed to be acknowledged by the Central Military Commission and was likely dissolved in 1985.
