= Reserve Antiaircraft Artillery Division of Heilongjiang Provincial Military District =

Chinese Military unit

Reserve Division of Daqing (1983-85) Reserve Infantry Division of Daqing (1985-87) Reserve Anti-Aircraft Artillery Division of Daqing (1987-99) Reserve Antiaircraft Artillery Division of Heilongjiang Provincial Military District (1999-2021)
- Active: 1984.8 - 2021
- Country: People's Republic of China
- Branch: People's Liberation Army
- Role: Infantry, Air Defense
- Size: Division
- Part of: Heilongjiang Provincial Military District
- Garrison/HQ: Daqing, Heilongjiang

The Reserve Division of Daqing (Chinese: 大庆陆军预备役师) was activated in 1983 in Daqing, Heilongjiang. The division was then composed of:

- 1st Regiment
- 2nd Regiment
- 3rd Regiment
- Artillery Regiment

In 1985 it was redesignated as the Reserve Infantry Division of Daqing (Chinese: 大庆陆军预备役步兵师).

In 1987 the division was converted to an air defense unit as the Reserve Anti-Aircraft Artillery Division of Daqing (Chinese: 大庆陆军预备役高炮师). The division was then composed of:

- 1st AAA Regiment - 1st and 4th Drilling Corporation, Daqing Oil Field
- 2nd AAA Regiment - Daqing Petrochemical Corporation
- 3rd AAA Regiment
- 4th AAA Regiment

In January 1999 the division was merged with the Anti-Aircraft Artillery Brigade, 64th Army and redesignated as the Reserve Antiaircraft Artillery Division of Heilongjiang Provincial Military District(Chinese: 黑龙江陆军预备役高炮师).
