= 78th Group Army =

Chinese corps-level military unit

- 第七十八集团军
- Active: 1949–present
- Country: China
- Allegiance: Chinese Communist Party
- Branch: People's Liberation Army Ground Force
- Type: Group army
- Part of: Northern Theater Command Ground Force
- Garrison/HQ: (China) Harbin, Heilongjiang
- Engagements: World War II; Chinese Civil War; Korean War

Commanders
- Current commander: Major General Zhang Fan
- Political Commissar: Major General Zhang Xiao
- Notable commanders: Yang Dezhi; Yang Yong; Su Zhenhua

Insignia
- NATO Map Symbol

The 78th Group Army (Chinese: 第七十八集团军; pinyin: Dì Qīshíbā Jítuánjūn), Unit 31669, formerly the 16th Group Army, is a military formation of the Chinese People's Liberation Army Ground Force (PLAGF). The 78th Group Army is one of thirteen total group armies of the PLAGF, the largest echelon of ground forces in the People's Republic of China, and one of three assigned to the nation's Northern Theater Command.

== History ==
The origins of this army go back to Nanchang Uprising. After People's Republic of China was established, it belonged to the 62nd Group Army for a while.

On February 19, 1949, column 1 of the Shanxi-Hebei-Shandong-Henan Military Region in Henan Shenqiu area became the 16th Army of the People's Liberation Army, was placed under the 5th Corps of the PLA Second Field Army. Yin Xianbing (尹先炳) was appointed army commander.

== Organization ==
It was composed of the 69th, 46th, 48th, and 4th Armored Divisions, the 68th brigade and an artillery brigade.

In 2006 the formation consisted of the:

- Headquarters, Changchun, Jilin
- 46th Motorized Infantry Division, Changchun, Jilin
- 48th Motorized Infantry Brigade, Tonghua, Jilin
- 4th Armored Division, Meihekou, Jilin
- Artillery Brigade, Yantian, Jilin
- AA Brigade, Changchun, Jilin

(Source Blasko 2006, 76)

In 2013, the formation consisted of the:

- Headquarters, Changchun, Jilin
- 46th Motorized Infantry Division (the Red Army Division), Changchun, Jilin
- 69th Motorized Infantry Division, Harbin, Heilongjiang
- 48th Motorized Infantry Brigade, Tonghua, Jilin
- 68th Motorized Infantry Brigade (People's Republic of China), Qiqihar, Heilongjiang
- 4th Armored Division, Meihekou, Jilin
- Artillery Brigade, Yanbian, Jilin
- AA Brigade, Changchun, Jilin

Note Blasko 2013, lists the 4th Armored Division as a division, not as a brigade.

(Source Blasko, Tradition and Transformation of the PLA, 2013, 89)

In 2017, the formation consisted of the:

- Headquarters, Harbin, Heilongjiang
- 8th Heavy Combined Arms Brigade (重型合成第8旅)
- 48th Light Combined Arms Brigade (轻型合成第48旅)
- 68th Heavy Combined Arms Brigade (重型合成第68旅)
- 115th Medium Combined Arms Brigade (中型合成第115旅)
- 202nd Heavy Combined Arms Brigade (重型合成第202旅)
- 204th Heavy Combined Arms Brigade (重型合成第204旅)
- 78th Special Operation Brigade (特战第78旅) (formerly the 67th Brigade)
- 78th Army Aviation Brigade (陆航第78旅)
- 78th Artillery Brigade (炮兵第78旅)
- 78th Air-Defense Brigade (防空第78旅)
- 78th Engineering and Chemical Defense Brigade (工化第78旅)
- 78th Service Support Brigade (勤务支援第78旅)

== Notable members ==
General Xu Caihou, former vice-chairman of the Central Military Commission (CMC) who was detained as part of a high-profile anti-corruption campaign, was a former member of the 78th Group Army.

Lieutenant General Bi Yi, the incumbent commander of the People's Liberation Army Information Support Force, was a former deputy commander of the unit.
