= Reserve Infantry Division of Hohhot =

Chinese Military unit

Reserve Division of Hohhot (1983-85) Reserve Infantry Division of Hohhot (1985-99)
- Active: 1983.9.17 - 1999.10
- Country: People's Republic of China
- Branch: People's Liberation Army
- Role: Infantry
- Size: Division
- Part of: Inner Mongolia Military District
- Garrison/HQ: Hohhot, Inner Mongolia

The Reserve Infantry Division of Hohhot (Chinese: 呼和浩特陆军预备役步兵师) was a reserve infantry formation of the People's Liberation Army active between 1983 and 1999.

The Reserve Division of Hohhot (Chinese: 呼和浩特陆军预备役师) was formally activated on September 17, 1983, in Hohhot, Inner Mongolia. The division was then composed of:

- 1st Regiment - Saihan District
- 2nd Regiment
- 3rd Regiment - Togtoh County
- Tank Regiment - Huimin District
- Artillery Regiment - Hohhot

In 1985 the division was redesignated as the Reserve Infantry Division of Hohhot(Chinese: 呼和浩特陆军预备役步兵师). In 1986, Tank Regiment was reorganized into the Artillery Regiment, Reserve Infantry Division of Hohhot.

In October 1999, the division merged with the 30th Infantry Brigade to form the 30th Reserve Infantry Division of Inner Mongolia(Chinese: 内蒙古陆军预备役第30师).
