= Reserve Antiaircraft Artillery Division of Hubei Provincial Military District =

Chinese Military unit

- Active: 1983.9 -
- Country: People's Republic of China
- Branch: People's Liberation Army
- Role: Anti-Aircraft Artillery
- Size: Division
- Part of: Hubei Provincial Military District
- Garrison/HQ: Wuhan, Hubei

The Reserve Antiaircraft Artillery Division of Hubei Provincial Military District moved to Wuhan, Hubei and was reconstituted by Reserve Division of Xiangyang which was activated on September 13, 1983, in Xiangyang, Hubei.

== Subordinate organization ==
- 1st Anti-Aircraft Artillery Regiment - Wuhan
- 2nd Anti-Aircraft Artillery Regiment - Xiaogan
- 3rd Anti-Aircraft Artillery Regiment - Huangshi
- 4th Anti-Aircraft Artillery Regiment - Jingzhou, activated on July 7, 2005
