= Reserve Infantry Division of Guangxi Provincial Military District =

Chinese military unit

Reserve Division of Liuzhou (1984-85) Reserve Infantry Division of Liuzhou (1985-99) Reserve Infantry Division of Guangxi (1999–)
- Active: 1984 -
- Country: People's Republic of China
- Branch: People's Liberation Army
- Role: Infantry
- Size: Division
- Part of: Guangxi Military District
- Garrison/HQ: Liuzhou, Guangxi
- Engagements: Sino-Vietnam War

The Reserve Infantry Division of Guangxi(Chinese: 广西陆军预备役步兵师) is a reserve infantry formation of the People's Liberation Army.

The Reserve Division of Liuzhou (Chinese: 柳州陆军预备役师) was formally activated in 1984 in Liuzhou, Guangxi. The division was then composed of:

- 1st Regiment
- 2nd Regiment
- 3rd Regiment
- Artillery Regiment

In 1985 the division was redesignated as the Reserve Infantry Division of Liuzhou(Chinese: 柳州陆军预备役步兵师).

The division participated in the Sino-Vietnam War.

On November 11, 1999, the division was then redesignated as the Reserve Infantry Division of Guangxi.

From 2017 the division was composed of:

- 1st Regiment - Laibin, Guangxi
- 2nd Regiment - Yulin, Guangxi
- 3rd Regiment - Qingzhou, Guangxi
- Artillery Regiment - Liuzhou, Guangxi
- Anti-Aircraft Artillery Regiment - Nanning, Guangxi
