= 31st Artillery Division =

31st Anti-tank Artillery Division (1950-1976)
- Active: 1950.10 - 1976.2
- Country: People's Republic of China
- Branch: People's Liberation Army
- Type: Division
- Role: Artillery
- Engagements: Korean War, Sino-Soviet border conflict

The 31st Anti-tank Artillery Division (Chinese: 战防炮兵第31师) was created in October 1950 from 4th Artillery Training Base (former 21st Division).

As of its formation the division was composed of 401st and 402nd Anti-tank Artillery Regiments. On December 15, 1951, 403rd Anti-tank Artillery Regiment was formed and attached to the division.

In March 1951 31st Artillery Division entered Korea as a part of People's Volunteer Army. During its deployment in Korea the division took part in the Fourth and Fifth Offensive, the defensive operations in 1951 and the Battle of Triangle Hill in 1952. In 1952 the division was renamed as 31st Anti-tank Artillery Division(Chinese: 反坦克炮兵第31师, note the changes on Chinese Characters).

In October 1952 412th and 413th Anti-tank Artillery Regiments were formed and attached to the division. 401st Regiment was detached and transferred to 33rd Artillery Division.

In October 1953 31st Artillery Division pulled out from Korea and stationed at Dalian, Liaoning province. Since then the division was under direct control from Shenyang Military Region. The division moved to Tongliao years later. Its final position was in Siping, Jilin province.

In 1954 the division received equipment from a Soviet Anti-Tank Artillery Brigade retreating from Lvda Region.

In March 1958 the 403rd Regiment was detached and transferred to 34th Artillery Division. Since then the division was composed of:

- 402nd Anti-tank Artillery Regiment;
- 412th Anti-tank Artillery Regiment;
- 413th Anti-tank Artillery Regiment.

In March 1969, 2nd Battalion, 413th Anti-tank Artillery Regiment of 31st Artillery Division took part in the Zhenbao Island Conflict.

In February 1976 the division was disbanded.
