= Jiajiang County =

Jiajiang County 夹江县
- County
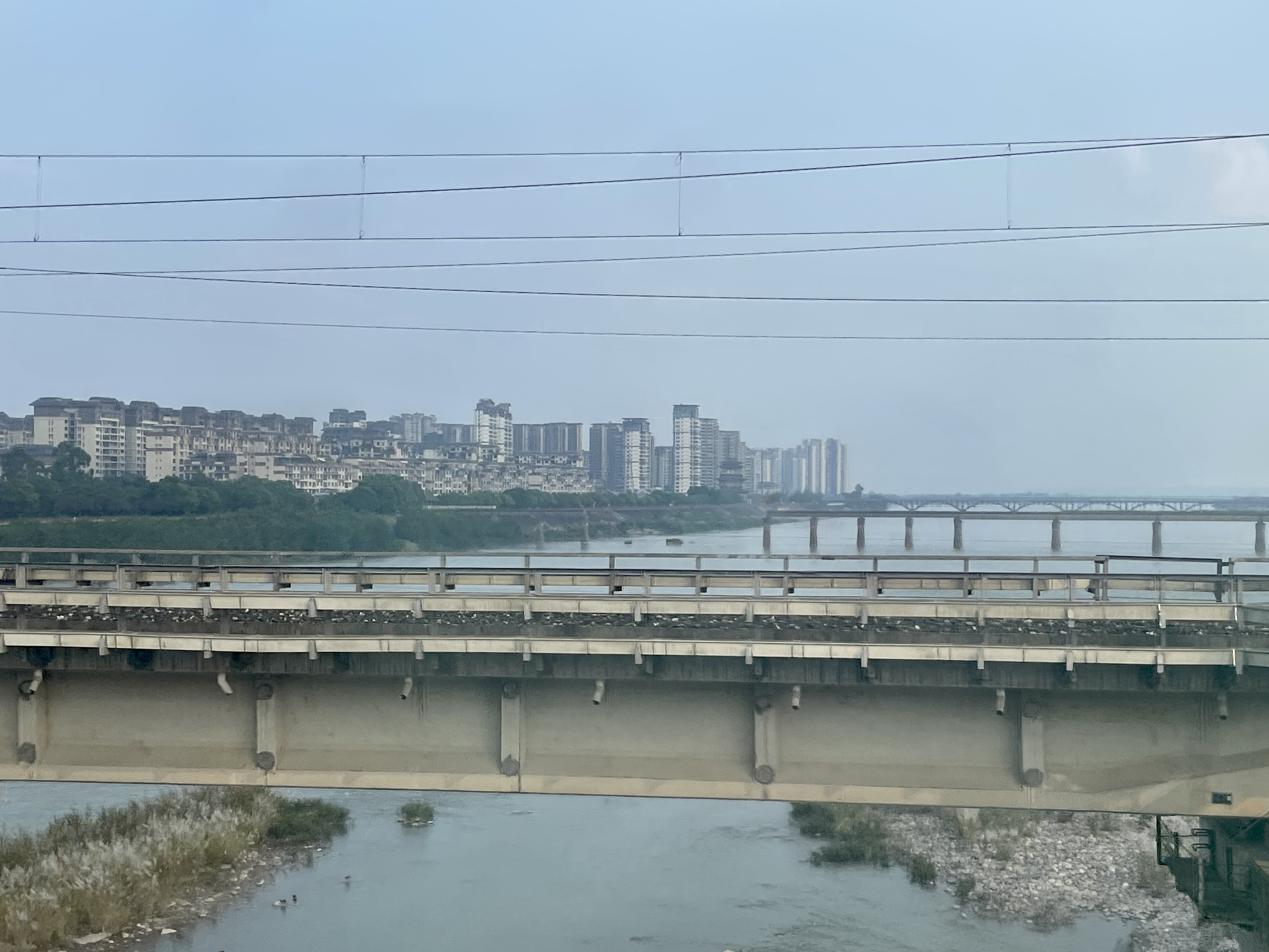

- Location of the seat in Sichuan
- Coordinates: 29°44′31″N 103°33′54″E
- Country: China
- Province: Sichuan
- Prefecture-level city: Leshan
- County seat: Yancheng

Area
  - Total: 749 km^{2} (289 sq mi)

Population (2009)
  - Total: 352,120
  - Density: 470/km^{2} (1,220/sq mi)
- Time zone: UTC+8 (China Standard)

Jiajiang County (simplified Chinese: 夹江县; traditional Chinese: 夾江縣; pinyin: Jiājiāng Xiàn) is a county in central Sichuan Province, China. It is under the administration of Leshan city.

== Administrative divisions ==
Jiajiang County comprises 2 subdistricts and 7 towns:

subdistricts

- Qingyi 青衣街道
- Yancheng 漹城街道

towns

- Huangtu 黄土镇
- Ganjiang 甘江镇
- Wuchang 吴场镇
- Mucheng 木城镇
- Huatou 华头镇
- Xinchang 新场镇
- Macun 马村镇

== Cultural attractions ==
- The Tenfu Tea Museum
- Jiajiang Thousand Buddha Rock Scenic Area, dating to the Tang dynasty.

== Climate ==
Climate data for Jiajiang, elevation 475 m (1,558 ft), (1991–2020 normals, extremes 1981–present)
| Month | Jan | Feb | Mar | Apr | May | Jun | Jul | Aug | Sep | Oct | Nov | Dec | Year |
|---|---|---|---|---|---|---|---|---|---|---|---|---|---|
| Record high °C (°F) | 21.2 (70.2) | 25.0 (77.0) | 31.7 (89.1) | 33.4 (92.1) | 36.0 (96.8) | 37.3 (99.1) | 37.6 (99.7) | 40.9 (105.6) | 35.7 (96.3) | 29.7 (85.5) | 26.2 (79.2) | 19.3 (66.7) | 40.9 (105.6) |
| Mean daily maximum °C (°F) | 10.1 (50.2) | 13.1 (55.6) | 18.0 (64.4) | 23.6 (74.5) | 27.2 (81.0) | 29.0 (84.2) | 31.1 (88.0) | 30.9 (87.6) | 26.5 (79.7) | 21.4 (70.5) | 16.9 (62.4) | 11.5 (52.7) | 21.6 (70.9) |
| Daily mean °C (°F) | 6.9 (44.4) | 9.3 (48.7) | 13.4 (56.1) | 18.4 (65.1) | 22.2 (72.0) | 24.4 (75.9) | 26.3 (79.3) | 26.0 (78.8) | 22.6 (72.7) | 18.1 (64.6) | 13.6 (56.5) | 8.5 (47.3) | 17.5 (63.5) |
| Mean daily minimum °C (°F) | 4.5 (40.1) | 6.5 (43.7) | 9.9 (49.8) | 14.4 (57.9) | 18.3 (64.9) | 21.0 (69.8) | 22.8 (73.0) | 22.6 (72.7) | 19.9 (67.8) | 15.9 (60.6) | 11.3 (52.3) | 6.2 (43.2) | 14.4 (58.0) |
| Record low °C (°F) | −3.8 (25.2) | −1.7 (28.9) | −0.5 (31.1) | 4.0 (39.2) | 8.9 (48.0) | 13.9 (57.0) | 16.8 (62.2) | 16.14 (61.05) | 12.9 (55.2) | 4.6 (40.3) | 1.2 (34.2) | −2.9 (26.8) | −3.8 (25.2) |
| Average precipitation mm (inches) | 12.7 (0.50) | 20.1 (0.79) | 37.2 (1.46) | 75.8 (2.98) | 106.0 (4.17) | 141.2 (5.56) | 271.8 (10.70) | 326.6 (12.86) | 139.5 (5.49) | 64.5 (2.54) | 27.7 (1.09) | 12.3 (0.48) | 1,235.4 (48.62) |
| Average precipitation days (≥ 0.1 mm) | 9.7 | 10.2 | 13.0 | 14.2 | 15.3 | 16.8 | 16.5 | 15.9 | 16.7 | 17.4 | 9.9 | 8.6 | 164.2 |
| Average snowy days | 0.5 | 0.3 | 0 | 0 | 0 | 0 | 0 | 0 | 0 | 0 | 0 | 0.2 | 1 |
| Average relative humidity (%) | 83 | 80 | 76 | 75 | 74 | 80 | 82 | 82 | 83 | 84 | 83 | 83 | 80 |
| Mean monthly sunshine hours | 35.9 | 49.7 | 81.4 | 110.4 | 114.1 | 100.3 | 124.7 | 133.0 | 64.1 | 42.5 | 45.1 | 34.5 | 935.7 |
| Percentage possible sunshine | 11 | 16 | 22 | 28 | 27 | 24 | 29 | 33 | 18 | 12 | 14 | 11 | 20 |
Source: China Meteorological Administration all-time extreme temperature all-time January high
