= Reserve Infantry Division of Chengde =

Chinese Military unit

1st Reserve Division of Chengde (1983-85) Reserve Infantry Division of Chengde (1985-99) Reserve Division of Hebei (1999-2021)
- Active: 1983.7 - 2021
- Country: People's Republic of China
- Branch: People's Liberation Army
- Role: Infantry
- Size: Division
- Part of: Hebei Provincial Military District
- Garrison/HQ: Chengde, Hebei

The Reserve Infantry Division of Hebei(Chinese: 河北陆军预备役师) was a reserve infantry formation of the People's Liberation Army active since 1983.

The division was activated in July 1983, in Chengde, Hebei as the 1st Reserve Division of Chengde(Chinese: 承德陆军预备役第1师). The division was then composed of:

- 1st Regiment - Pingquan
- 2nd Regiment - Chengde County
- 3rd Regiment - Kuancheng
- Artillery Regiment - Xinglong
- Tank Regiment- Chengde

In January 1986 the division was redesignated as the Reserve Infantry Division of Chengde(Chinese: 承德陆军预备役步兵师). In March 1986, the Tank Regiment was disbanded.

In March 1999 the division was redesignated as the Reserve Infantry Division of Hebei(Chinese: 河北陆军预备役步兵师). The 2nd Regiment was disbanded and replaced by a new regiment activated in Hengshui.

Since then the division was composed of:

- 1st Regiment
- 2nd Regiment - Hengshui
- 3rd Regiment - Neiqiu
- Artillery Regiment
