= Reserve Infantry Division of Xinjiang Military District =

Reserve Division of Shihezi (1984-85) Reserve Infantry Division of Xinjiang Military District (1985–)
- Active: 1984.5 -
- Country: People's Republic of China
- Branch: People's Liberation Army
- Role: Infantry
- Size: Division
- Part of: Xinjiang Military District

The Reserve Infantry Division of Xinjiang Military District(Chinese: 新疆军区陆军预备役步兵师) is a reserve infantry formation of the People's Liberation Army.

On July 17, 1983, the formation of a reserve infantry unit began in Shihezi Military Sub-district according to Order No.787 of the Urumqi Military Region.

The Reserve Division of Shihezi (Chinese: 石河子预备役师) was formally activated on May 1, 1984. The division was then composed of:

- 1st Regiment
- 2nd Regiment
- 3rd Regiment
- Artillery Regiment

In December 1985, Shihezi Military Sub-district was disbanded. The division was then redesignated as the Reserve Infantry Division of Xinjiang Military District and was put under now Xinjiang Military District's control. From 1987 the division maintained as fully manned and equipped.

On August 28, 2005, Anti-Aircraft Artillery Regiment, Reserve Infantry Division of Xinjiang Military District was activated.

Since then the division was composed of:

- 1st Regiment - Changji, Xinjiang
- 2nd Regiment - Shihezi, Xinjiang
- 3rd Regiment - Kuitun, Xinjiang
- Artillery Regiment - Shihezi, Xinjiang
- Anti-Aircraft Artillery Regiment - Urumqi, Xinjiang.
