= Reserve Infantry Division of Heilongjiang Provincial Military District =

Chinese Military unit

Reserve Infantry Division of Heilongjiang Provincial Military District (1999–)
- Active: 1999.3 -
- Country: People's Republic of China
- Branch: People's Liberation Army
- Role: Infantry
- Size: Division
- Part of: Heilongjiang Provincial Military District
- Garrison/HQ: Mudanjiang, Heilongjiang

The Reserve Infantry Division of Xinjiang Military District(Chinese: 黑龙江省军区陆军预备役步兵师) is a reserve infantry formation of the People's Liberation Army.

The division was activated in March 1999.

Since then the division was composed of:

- 1st Regiment - Suihua, Heilongjiang
- 2nd Regiment - Heihe, Heilongjiang
- 3rd Regiment - Mudanjiang, Heilongjiang
- Artillery Regiment - Mudanjiang, Heilongjiang
- Anti-Aircraft Artillery Regiment - Jiamusi, Heilongjiang
- Engineer Regiment - Harbin, Heilongjiang.
