= Reserve Infantry Division of Guyuan =

Chinese Military unit

Reserve Division of Guyuan Area (1984-85)
- Active: 1984.6 - 1985.10
- Country: People's Republic of China
- Branch: People's Liberation Army
- Role: Infantry
- Size: Division
- Part of: Ningxia Military District
- Garrison/HQ: Guyuan, Ningxia

The Reserve Infantry Division of Guyuan Area(Chinese: 固原地区陆军预备役师) was a short-lived reserve infantry formation of the People's Liberation Army active between 1984 and 1985.

The division was formally activated on June 8, 1984, in Guyuan, Ningxia. The division was then composed of:

- 1st Regiment - Longde
- 2nd Regiment - Xiji
- 3rd Regiment - Haiyuan
- Artillery Regiment

In October 1985 the division was disbanded along with all its subordinates.
