= 95th Division (People's Republic of China) =

Former Chinese military unit

95th Division (1949–51)
- Active: March 1949–February 1951
- Country: People's Republic of China
- Branch: People's Liberation Army
- Type: Division
- Role: Infantry
- Part of: 32nd Corps
- Engagements: Chinese Civil War

The 95th Division (Chinese: 第95师) was created in March 1949 under the Regulation of the Redesignations of All Organizations and Units of the Army, issued by Central Military Commission on November 1, 1948, basing on the 5th New-formed Division, Jiaodong Column of the PLA Huadong Military District. 5th New-formed Division was formed in March 1948.

The division was part of the 32nd Corps. Under the flag of 95th Division it took part in the Chinese Civil War. In October 1950 32rd Corps was disbanded and the division was absorbed into the Air Force. On February 14, 1951, the division was reorganized and renamed as the PLAAF´s 14th Fighter Division.

As of reorganization the division was composed of:

- 283rd Regiment;
- 284th Regiment;
- 285th Regiment.
