= 1st Reserve Infantry Division of Beijing =

1st Reserve Infantry Division of Beijing (1983-1999)
- Active: 1983.9 - 1999.3
- Country: People's Republic of China
- Branch: People's Liberation Army
- Role: Infantry
- Size: Division
- Part of: Beijing Guard District
- Garrison/HQ: Huairou, Beijing

The 1st Reserve Infantry Division of Beijing(Chinese: 北京陆军预备役步兵第1师) was a reserve infantry formation of the People's Liberation Army.

The formation of the division started in September 1983. The division was formally activated on February 1, 1985.

The division was then composed of:

- 1st Regiment - Tong County, Beijing
- 2nd Regiment - Shunyi, Beijing
- 3rd Regiment
- Artillery Regiment - Pinggu, Beijing
- Tank Regiment - Huairou, Beijing

Tank Regiment, 1st Reserve Infantry Division was deactivated in October 1986.

The division, combined with the 2nd Reserve Infantry Division of Beijing, reorganized into the Reserve Antiaircraft Artillery Division of Beijing Guard District in March 1999.
