= Reserve Infantry Division of Anhui Provincial Military District =

Reserve Division of Chu County (1983-98) Reserve Infantry Division of Anhui (1999–)
- Active: 1983.11 -
- Country: People's Republic of China
- Branch: People's Liberation Army
- Role: Infantry
- Size: Division
- Part of: Anhui Provincial Military District
- Garrison/HQ: Chuzhou, Anhui

The Reserve Infantry Division of Anhui Provincial Military District (Chinese: 安徽陆军预备役步兵师) is a reserve infantry formation of the People's Liberation Army.

The Reserve Infantry Division of Chu County(Chinese: 滁县陆军预备役步兵师) was activated on November 17, 1983, at Chu County, Anhui. The division was composed of 3 infantry regiments and 1 artillery regiment.

In 1999 the division was reorganized as the Reserve Infantry Division of Anhui. In September 1999, the Anti-Aircraft Artillery Regiment, Reserve Infantry Division of Anhui was activated from the inactivating 102nd Infantry Regiment, 34th Infantry Division.

The division was now composed of:

- 1st Infantry Regiment - Fuyang, Anhui
- 2nd Infantry Regiment - Anqing, Anhui
- 3rd Infantry Regiment - Chaohu, Anhui
- Artillery Regiment - Chuzhou, Anhui
- Anti-Aircraft Artillery Regiment
