= Reserve Infantry Division of Hunan Provincial Military District =

Chinese Military unit

Reserve Division of Zhuzhou (1984-85) Reserve Infantry Division of Zhuzhou (1985-99) Reserve Infantry Division of Hunan (1999–)
- Active: 1984 -
- Country: People's Republic of China
- Branch: People's Liberation Army
- Role: Infantry
- Size: Division
- Part of: Hunan Provincial Military District
- Garrison/HQ: Zhuzhou, Hunan

The Reserve Infantry Division of Hunan(Chinese: 湖南陆军预备役步兵师) is a reserve infantry formation of the People's Liberation Army.

The Reserve Division of Zhuzhou (Chinese: 株洲陆军预备役师) was formally activated in 1984 in Zhuzhou, Guizhou. The division was then composed of:

- 1st Regiment
- 2nd Regiment
- 3rd Regiment
- Artillery Regiment

In 1985 the division was redesignated as the Reserve Infantry Division of Zhuzhou(Chinese: 株洲陆军预备役步兵师).

In 1999 the division was then redesignated as the Reserve Infantry Division of Hunan.

From 2017 the division was composed of:

- 1st Regiment - Xiangtan, Hunan
- 2nd Regiment - Changde, Hunan
- 3rd Regiment - Yueyang, Hunan
- Artillery Regiment - Zhuzhou, Hunan
- Anti-Aircraft Artillery Regiment - Changsha, Hunan
