= Reserve Infantry Division of Chaoyang =

Chinese Military unit

Reserve Division of Chaoyang
- Active: 1983.8 - 1986.3
- Country: People's Republic of China
- Branch: People's Liberation Army
- Role: Infantry
- Size: Division
- Part of: Liaoning Provincial Military District
- Garrison/HQ: Chaoyang, Liaoning

The Reserve Division of Chaoyang (Chinese: 朝阳陆军预备役师) was formally activated in March 1983, in Chaoyang, Liaoning. The division was then composed of:

- 1st Regiment
- 2nd Regiment
- 3rd Regiment
- Artillery Regiment

The division was located in the city of Chaoyang, along with Beipiao, Kazuo, Jianchang, and Jianping.

As of its activation, the division was composed of 13,392 personnel, with 4 122 mm howitzers, 4 85 mm guns, 4 107mm MRLs, 4 twin-14.5 mm AA MGs, and 10 tractor vehicles.

The division was disbanded in March 1986.
