= 105th Street =

105th Street may refer to:

- 105 Street, Edmonton, Alberta, Canada
- 105th Street station, New York City, US
