= Reserve Infantry Division of Yulin =

Chinese Military unit

Reserve Division of Yulin (1984-85/89)
- Active: 1984 - 1985? / 1989.12?
- Country: People's Republic of China
- Branch: People's Liberation Army
- Role: Infantry
- Size: Division
- Part of: Shaanxi Provincial Military District
- Garrison/HQ: Yulin, Shaanxi

The Reserve Division of Yulin (Chinese: 榆林陆军预备役师) was a short-lived reserve infantry formation of China's People's Liberation Army active between 1984 and 1989.

The division was formally activated in July/August/September 5, 1984 in Yulin, Shaanxi. By then the division was then composed of:

- 1st Regiment
- 2nd Regiment
- 3rd Regiment - Hengshan
- Artillery Regiment

In December 1989, the division was disbanded along with all its subordinates. Another source stated it was disbanded in 1985.
