= 21st Division (People's Republic of China) =

21st Division (1949–50)
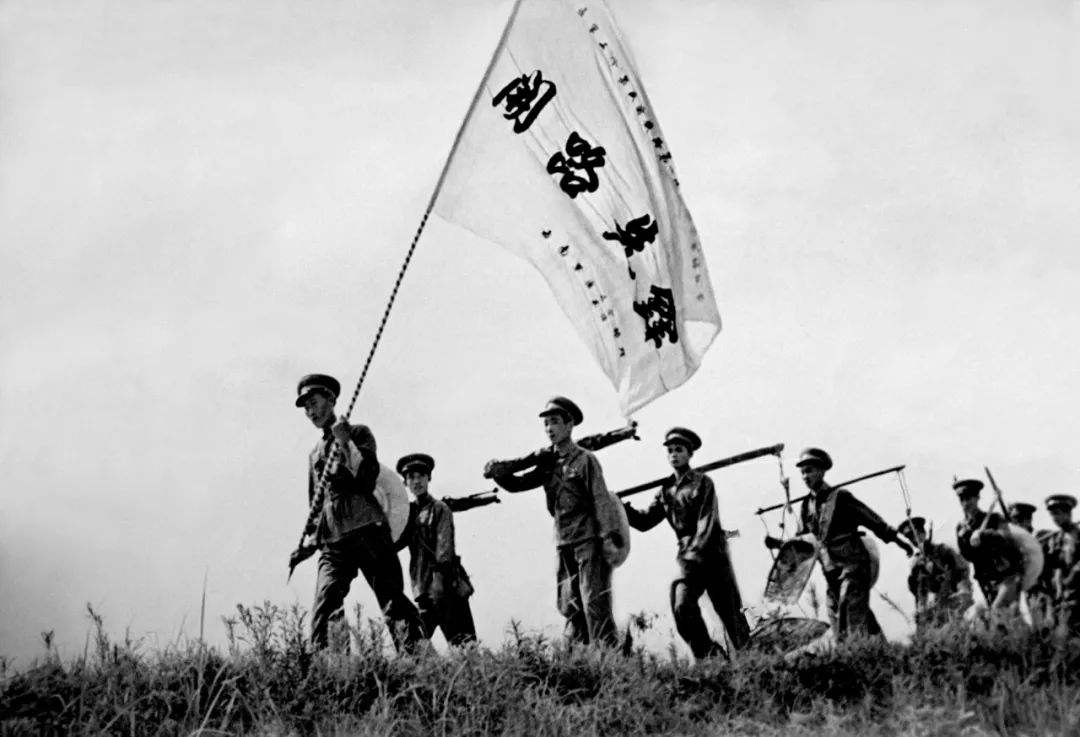
- The "Trailbreakers" of the Tianshui-Lanzhou Railway in China, a group that the 21st Division would be part of from the group's creation until the division's dissolution in October 1950
- Active: 1949 - 1950
- Country: People's Republic of China
- Allegiance: Chinese Communist Party
- Branch: People's Liberation Army
- Type: Division
- Role: Infantry
- Part of: 7th Army
- Engagements: Chinese Civil War: Battle of Weinan

Commanders
- Brigadier: Fan Zhongxiang
- Political Commissar: Li Jianliang
- Notable commanders: Li Yuanming; Duan Shikai

The 21st Division (simplified Chinese: 第21师; traditional Chinese: 第21師; pinyin: Dì èrshíyī shī) was a short-lived division of the Chinese People's Liberation Army which was in service both during and after the Chinese Civil War. The division was created in June 1949 by the Regulation of the Re-Designations of All Organizations and Units of the Army, issued by Central Military Commission on November 1, 1948, being formed from the People's Liberation Army 5th Independent Brigade. The division's history can be traced to 2nd Independent Brigade of the Jinzhong Military District, formed in October 1948.

Though the extent of the service of the 21st Division would be limited, it would participate in the Chinese Civil War through support of other divisions, such as those in the Taiyuan Campaign. The division would participate in the Battle of Weinan in before it would be moved to southern China to continue minor operations there until the end of the Civil War.

In March 1950, the 21st Division participated in the construction of the Tianshui-Lanzhou Railway in central China. The division would be dissolved in October 1950, before the railway was completed in October 1952, to become the similarly short-lived 4th Artillery Training Base, the predecessor to the 31st Artillery Division.

== Structure ==
The 21st division was part of the North China military region, the successor to the Chinese former Beijing Military Region, and the current Northern Theater Command. For the time of its service, the division was part of the 1st Field Army of the Chinese 7th Army. From its creation in 1949 to its disillusion in 1950, the division was composed of three separate regiments. Those being:

- 61st Regiment;
- 62nd Regiment;
- 63rd Regiment.

Leading the division was the division's brigadier, Fan Zhongxiang (Chinese: 范忠祥; pinyin: Fàn Zhōngxiáng). Fan, an early member of the Chinese Communist Party, became the 21st division's sole brigadier from its creation in 1949 until its disbanding in 1950. A participant on the Long March, Fan would become one of the People's Republic of China's founding generals in 1953 after his career in leading the 21st division and its successor, the 31st Anti-tank Artillery Division. During the Korean War, Fan was awarded the rank of Major General while still retaining his role as brigadier of the 21st Division's successors until his retirement in 1982.

The political capabilities of the division were led by Li Jianliang (Chinese: 李建良; pinyin: Lǐ Jiànliáng) as its political commissar. Li, along with Fan, took part in the Long March, though Li took part in the Second Sino-Japanese War as part of the infamous Eighth Route Army before his service in the 21st Division.

Though the division did have multiple commanders under the central command of Fan Zhongxiang and Li Jianliang, two of the division's best known commanders include figures such as Li Yuanming (Chinese: 李元明; pinyin: Lǐ Yuánmíng) and Duan Shikai (Chinese: 段士楷; pinyin: Duàn Shìkǎi).

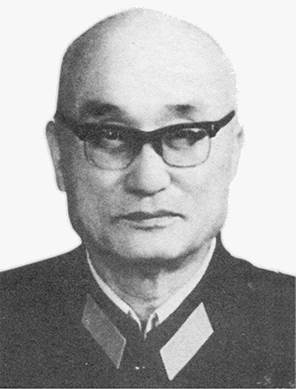
Duan Shikai, a commander of the 21st division later involved as a major general of the People's Liberation Army

== Service ==
With much of its early leadership and base of soldiers from Shanxi, the division would be sent to participate in the larger capture of Kuomintang-controlled territory across neighboring Shaanxi in early- to mid-1949. Gradually, the area around the city of Weinan was captured by the 21st Division and its allies, only facing minor fighting as the city itself was fully captured by about the middle of the year. The city, previously faced with a communist insurgency, housed little resistance as time went on and the general advance of the People's Liberation Army continued.

After the fall of Weinan, the 21st Division was moved to South-Western China, facing little combat in the areas already controlled by the People's Republic of China.

By the time of the war's end, the division was sent to Gansu, where it would participate in the construction of the Tianshui-Lanzhou Railway, a sub-section of the Longhai Railway that would be completed in 1953. Included as part of the so-called "trailbreakers" (Chinese: 开路先锋; pinyin: kāilù xiānfēng) of the railway, being some of the first to participate in its construction and expansion.

== Dissolution ==
The division was led as part of the 1st Field Army of the People's Liberation Army's 7th Army. Despite it only being in service for two years, in October 1950 it was disbanded to become the similarly short-lived 4th Artillery Training Base, becoming the 31st Anti-tank Artillery Division after that.

Many of the commanders of the 21st Division would still be involved either in the division's successors, or would be involved in larger roles as part of the 7th Army itself. An example being Duan Shikai, a commander of the 21st division who would become the director of the political department of the 7th Army itself later.
