= 111th Division (People's Republic of China) =

111th Division (1950–52)
- Active: 1950.2 - 1952.2
- Country: People's Republic of China
- Branch: People's Liberation Army
- Type: Division
- Role: Infantry
- Part of: 37th Corps

The 111th Division (Chinese: 第111师) was created in February 1950 under the Regulation of the Redesignations of All Organizations and Units of the Army, issued by Central Military Commission on November 1, 1948, basing on the 319th Division, 2nd Security Brigade and 5th Security Regiment of Republic of China Army defected on September 19, 1949 during the Chinese Civil War.

The division was part of 37th Corps. The US Department of State thought that the division had deployed to Korea by the end of 1950 for service in the Korean War.

In April 1951 personnel and equipment of the division were absorbed by 106th Division, and the 111th became a cadre division.

In February 1952 the division was disbanded.
