= Reserve Infantry Division of Duyun =

Chinese Military unit

4th Reserve Division of Kunming Military Region (1983-84) Reserve Division of Duyun (1984-85) Reserve Infantry Division of Duyun (1986-98)
- Active: 1983.3 - 1998
- Country: People's Republic of China
- Branch: People's Liberation Army
- Role: Infantry
- Size: Division
- Part of: Guizhou Provincial Military District
- Garrison/HQ: Duyun, Guizhou

The formation of the 4th Reserve Division of Kunming Military Region(Chinese: 昆明军区预备役第4师) started from March 1983 in Duyun, Guizhou. The division was then composed of:

- 10th Regiment - Fuquan
- 11th Regiment - Huishui
- 12th Regiment - Dushan

The division was redesignated as the Reserve Infantry Division of Duyun(Chinese: 都匀陆军预备役步兵师) in July 1984. An artillery regiment was activated in the same month. All regiments under the division were redesignated as follow:

- 1st Regiment - Fuquan
- 2nd Regiment - Huishui
- 3rd Regiment - former 12th, at Dushan County
- Artillery Regiment - Guiding County

The division was redesignated as the Reserve Infantry Division of Duyun(Chinese: 都匀陆军预备役步兵师) in late 1985.
