= 86th Motorized Infantry Division =

Chinese military unit

76th Division (1949–52) 76th Infantry Division (1952-60) 76th Army Division (1960-69) 88th Army Division (1969–75) 86th Army Division (1975–85) 86th Motorized Infantry Division (1985-)
- Active: 1949.2 –
- Country: China
- Allegiance: Chinese Communist Party
- Branch: People's Liberation Army
- Type: Division
- Role: Infantry
- Part of: 31st Group Army
- Garrison/HQ: Lianjiang, Fujian.
- Engagements: Chinese Civil War, Korean War

The 76th Division (Chinese: 第76师) was created in February 1949 under the Regulation of the Redesignations of All Organizations and Units of the Army, issued by Central Military Commission on November 1, 1948, basing on the 22nd Division, 8th Column of the Huadong Field Army. Its history can be traced to the 4th Division of Shandong Military District, formed in August 1945.

The division was then a part of 26th Corps. Under the flag of 76th it took part in several major battles during the Chinese Civil War.

In November 1950 the division entered Korea with the Corps HQ as a part of the People's Volunteer Army, consisting of the 226th, 227th, and the 228th Regiments. During its deployment in Korea, the division took part in the 2nd, 4th and 5th Offensive of the PVA, and suffered heavy losses during the Battle of Chosin Reservoir.

In June 1952 the division pulled out of Korea and stationed in Shandong. From 1952 to 1960 the division was named as 76th Infantry Division(Chinese: 步兵第76师). In September 1952 356th Artillery Regiment and 281st Tank Self-Propelled Artillery Regiment were activated.

From 1952 to 1968, the division was composed of:

- 226th Infantry Regiment;
- 227th Infantry Regiment;
- 228th Infantry Regiment;
- 281st Tank Self-Propelled Artillery Regiment;
- 356th Artillery Regiment.

In April 1960 the division was renamed as 76th Army Division(Chinese: 陆军第76师).

In January 1961, the division became one of the first ten combat alert divisions of the People's Liberation Army, made it a fully manned and equipped "big" division under PLA glossary, composing of 12457 personnel. In 1962 the division was temporarily moved to Fujian for emergency alert mission, and shortly after returned to its garrison.

In July 1967 the division moved to Jiangxi.

In August 1968, 281st Tank Self-Propelled Artillery Regiment was detached and transferred to newly formed 8th Tank Division as 29th Tank Regiment.

In October 1969, the division formally detached from the 26th Army Corps and was put under control of Jiangxi Provincial Military District. In December the division was renamed as 88th Army Division(Chinese: 陆军第88师), and all its regiments were re-designated as follows:

- 262nd Infantry Regiment (formed 226th);
- 263rd Infantry Regiment (formed 227th);
- 264th Infantry Regiment (formed 228th);
- Artillery Regiment (former 356th).

In April 1975, the division moved to Lianjiang, Fujian and was transferred to 29th Army Corps and renamed as 86th Army Division(Chinese: 陆军第86师), and all its regiments were renamed again as:

- 256th Infantry Regiment (former 262nd);
- 257th Infantry Regiment (former 263rd);
- 258th Infantry Regiment (former 264th);
- Artillery Regiment.

In 1985 the division was renamed as 86th Motorized Infantry Division (Chinese: 摩托化步兵第86师) and transferred to 31st Army following 29th's disbandment. From 1985 to 1998 the division maintained as a southern motorized infantry division, which was composed of:

- 256th Motorized Infantry Regiment;
- 257th Motorized Infantry Regiment;
- 258th Motorized Infantry Regiment;
- Artillery Regiment;
- Anti-Aircraft Artillery Regiment.

In 1998 258th Motorized Infantry Regiment was inactivated; The main part of Tank Regiment, 79th Motorized Infantry Division and 258th Infantry Regiment were converted to Armored Regiment, 86th Motorized Infantry Division. Since then the division was composed of:

- 256th Motorized Infantry Regiment;
- 257th Motorized Infantry Regiment;
- Armored Regiment;
- Artillery Regiment;
- Anti-Aircraft Artillery Regiment.

The division is now still a maneuver part of 31st Army, and an amphibious motorized infantry unit that may take part in the invasion of Kinmen in an upcoming war with Taiwan.
