= 160th Division (People's Republic of China) =

160th Division (1949)
- Active: 1949.3 - 1949.8
- Country: People's Republic of China
- Branch: People's Liberation Army
- Type: Division
- Role: Infantry
- Part of: 47th Corps

The 160th Division(Chinese: 第160师)(2nd Formation) was created in March 1949 basing on the 1st Training Division of Northeastern Military Region.

The division was a part of 47th Corps.

In August 1949 the division was disbanded.
