= 105th Division (1st Formation) (People's Republic of China) =

105th Division (1948–1950)
- Active: 1948.10 - 1950.3
- Country: People's Republic of China
- Branch: People's Liberation Army
- Type: Division
- Role: Infantry
- Part of: 35th Corps
- Engagements: Chinese Civil War

The 105th Division(Chinese: 第105师) was created in October 1948 basing on defected Independent Brigade of 96th Reorganized Corps, Republic of China Army.

The division was a part of PLA 35th Corps, under which command it took part in the 1949 battle of Nanjing.

In March 1950 the division was disbanded.

As of its disbandment the division was composed of:

- 313th Regiment;
- 314th Regiment;
- 315th Regiment.
