= 2nd Fighter Division (People's Republic of China) =

The 2nd Fighter Division of the People's Liberation Army Air Force is an air formation of the People's Republic of China. It was part of the Guangzhou Military Region Air Force.

The plan was to establish the formation at Shanghai Longhua Airport from personnel of the East China Military Region and the 208th Division of the North China Military Region, and the 624th Infantry Regiment Headquarters. It was formed in November 1950 at Shanghai Longhua with the 4th and 6th Regiments. It was initially mostly responsible for air defense duty of Shanghai, and it participated in the Korean War.

In the early morning of August 23, 1956, Zhang Wenyi, the 6th Regiment's commander, shot down a U.S. P4M-1Q electronic reconnaissance aircraft in the airspace of Zhoushan, Zhejiang.

In 2007, Ma Zhenjun was promoted from commander of the 2nd Fighter Division to deputy chief of staff of the Guangzhou Military Region Air Force, when he was 43.

In its last years the division operated Sukhoi Su-27 "Flanker" fighters and Chengdu J-7 aircraft from Suixi Airbase and J-7E aircraft at Liuzhou Airbase.
