= 205th Motorized Infantry Brigade =

Brigade of the People's Liberation Army

28th Division (1949–1952) 28th Infantry Division (1952–1960) 28th Army Division (1960–1969) 205th Army Division (1969–1985) 205th Infantry Division (1985–1998) 205th Motorized Infantry Brigade (1998–2003)
- Active: 1949.2 – 2003
- Country: People's Republic of China
- Branch: People's Liberation Army
- Type: Brigade
- Role: Infantry
- Part of: Inner Mongolian Military District
- Garrison/HQ: Huhhot, Inner Mongolia
- Nickname: "First Division of Liu-Deng Army"(Chinese: 刘邓大军第一师)
- Engagements: Chinese Civil War

The 28th Division (Chinese: 第28师) was created in February 1949 under the Regulation of the Redesignations of All Organizations and Units of the Army, issued by Central Military Commission on November 1, 1948, basing on the 4th Brigade, 2nd Column of Zhongyuan Field Army.

== History ==
The division is part of 10th Corps. Under the flag of the 28th division, it took part in several major battles during the Chinese Civil War. During the civil war, the division was composed of 82nd, 83rd, and 84th Infantry Regiments.

In April 1952 the division was transferred to the 23rd Army Group following the 10th Corps' disbandment. Its 83rd Infantry Regiment detached from the division, 84th Infantry Regiment was renamed as the new 83rd Infantry Regiment, and 550th Infantry Regiment of disbanding 184th Division was attached and renamed as the new 84th Infantry Regiment. By then the division was composed of:

- 82nd Infantry Regiment;
- 83rd Infantry Regiment (former 84th);
- 84th Infantry Regiment (former 550th);
- 233rd Tank Self Propelled Artillery Regiment;
- 585th Artillery Regiment.

In 1952 the division was renamed as 28th Infantry Division (Chinese: 步兵第28师). In December 1952, the 23rd Army Group was reduced and renamed as 69th Corps, and the division was maintained as a part of the Corps. In April 1960 the division was further renamed as 28th Army Division (Chinese: 陆军第28师). In September 1968 233rd Tank Self Propelled Artillery Regiment detached from the division and renamed as 26th Tank Regiment, 7th Tank Division.

In December 1969, 28th Army Division was renamed as 205th Army Division (Chinese: 陆军第205师). All its regiments were renamed as follows:

- 613th Infantry Regiment (former 82nd);
- 614th Infantry Regiment (former 83rd);
- 615th Infantry Regiment (former 84th);
- Artillery Regiment (former 585th).

In 1985 the division was renamed as 205th Infantry Division(Chinese: 步兵第205师) and transferred to 28th Army following 69th Army Corps' disbandment. Tank Regiment, 28th Army Corps was attached to the division and renamed as Tank Regiment, 205th Infantry Division. Anti-aircraft Artillery Regiment, 69th Army Corps was merged with Anti-aircraft Artillery Battalion of the division and renamed as Anti-aircraft Artillery Regiment, 205th Infantry Division. Since then the division was composed of:

- 613th Motorized Infantry Regiment;
- 614th Motorized Infantry Regiment;
- 615th Motorized Infantry Regiment;
- Tank Regiment;
- Artillery Regiment;
- Anti-aircraft Artillery Regiment.

From 1985 to 1998 the division was maintained as a Northern Motorized Infantry Division, Category A. In 1998 the division was reduced and renamed as 205th Motorized Infantry Brigade(Chinese: 摩托化步兵第205旅) and transferred to Inner Mongolian Military District's control following 28th Army's disbandment. The brigade was disbanded in 2003. Before its disbandment the division stationed in Huhhot, Inner Mongolia.
