= Chinese Civil War order of battle =

Order of Battle for the Chinese Civil War

This is the order of battle of the Chinese Civil War.

Fighting from 1937 to 1945 was limited due to the Second United Front.

== Communist Forces ==
=== 1928-1937 ===
- Chinese Communist Party
  - Chinese Soviet Republic
    - Chinese Workers' and Peasants' Red Army

=== 1937-1947 ===
- Chinese Communist Party (Note: Nominally under the command of the National Revolutionary Army)
  - Central Revolutionary Military Commission
    - Eighth Route Army
      - 115th Division
        - 343rd Brigade
        - 344th Brigade
      - 120th Division
        - 358th Brigade
        - 359th Brigade
      - 129th Division
        - 385th Brigade
        - 386th Brigade
    - New Fourth Army
      - Pre-1941
        - 1st Detachment
        - 2nd Detachment
        - 3rd Detachment
        - 4th Detachment
      - Post-1941
        - 1st Division
          - 1st Brigade
          - 2nd Brigade
          - 3rd Brigade
        - 2nd Division
          - 4th Brigade
          - 5th Brigade
          - 6th Brigade
        - 3rd Division
          - 7th Brigade
          - 8th Brigade
          - 9th Brigade
        - 4th Division
          - 10th Brigade
          - 11th Brigade
          - 12th Brigade
        - 5th Division
          - 13th Brigade
          - 14th Brigade
          - 15th Brigade
        - 6th Division
          - 16th Brigade
          - 18th Brigade
        - 7th Division
          - 19th Brigade
        - Independent Brigade

=== 1947-1950 ===
- Chinese Communist Party
  - People's Republic of China
    - Central Military Commission
      - People's Liberation Army
        - People's Liberation Army Ground Force
          - First Field Army
            - 1st Army
              - 1st Corps
                - 1st Division
                - 2nd Division
                - 3rd Division
              - 2nd Corps
                - 4th Division
                - 5th Division
                - 6th Division
              - 5th Corps
                - 13th Division
                - 14th Division
                - 15th Division
              - 6th Corps
                - 16th Division
                - 17th Division
                - 18th Division
            - 2nd Army
              - 3rd Corps
                - 7th Division
                - 8th Division
                - 9th Division
              - 4th Corps
                - 10th Division
                - 11th Division
                - 12th Division
              - 7th Corps
                - 19th Division
                - 20th Division
                - 21st Division
              - 8th Corps
                - 22nd Division
                - 23rd Division
                - 24th Division
            - 22nd Army
              - 9th Corps
                - 25th Division
                - 26th Division
                - 27th Division
              - 1st Cavalry Division
            - 19th Army
              - 63rd Corps
              - 64th Corps
              - 65th Corps
          - Second Field Army
            - 3rd Army
              - 10th Corps
                - 28th Division
                - 29th Division
                - 30th Division
              - 11th Corps
                - 31st Division
                - 32nd Division
                - 33rd Division
              - 12th Corps
                - 34th Division
                - 35th Division
                - 36th Division
            - 4th Army
              - 13th Corps
                - 37th Division
                - 38th Division
                - 39th Division
              - 14th Corps
                - 40th Division
                - 41st Division
                - 42nd Division
              - 15th Corps
                - 43rd Division
                - 44th Division
                - 45th Division
            - 5th Army
              - 16th Corps
                - 46th Division
                - 47th Division
                - 48th Division
              - 17th Corps
                - 49th Division
                - 50th Division
                - 51st Division
              - 18th Corps
                - 52nd Division
                - 53rd Division
                - 54th Division
          - Third Field Army
            - 7th Corps
              - 21st Army
                - 61st Division
                - 62nd Division
                - 63rd Division
              - 22nd Army
                - 64th Division
                - 65th Division
                - 66th Division
              - 23rd Army
            - 8th Corps
              - 24th Army
                - 70th Division
                - 71st Division
                - 72nd Division
              - 25th Army
                - 73rd Division
                - 74th Division
                - 75th Division
              - 26th Army
            - 9th Corps
              - 20th Army
                - 58th Division
                - 59th Division
                - 60th Division
              - 27th Army
                - 79th Division
                - 80th Division
                - 81st Division
              - 30th Army
              - 32nd Army
                - 94th Division
                - 95th Division
            - 10th Corps
              - 28th Army
                - 82nd Division
                - 83rd Division
                - 84th Division
              - 29th Army
                - 85th Division
                - 86th Division
                - 87th Division
              - 31st Army
                - 91st Division
                - 92nd Division
                - 93rd Division
            - Special Forces Column
          - Fourth Field Army
            - 12th Army
              - 40th Corps
              - 45th Corps
              - 46th Corps
            - 13th Army
              - 38th Corps
              - 47th Corps
              - 49th Corps
            - 14th Army
              - 39th Corps
              - 41st Corps
              - 42nd Corps
            - 15th Army
              - 43rd Corps
              - 44th Corps
              - 48th Corps
            - 21st Army
              - 52nd Corps
              - 53rd Corps
            - 50th Corps
            - 51st Corps
            - 54th Corps
            - 58th Corps
          - Huabei Field Army

=== Post-war conflicts ===
- People's Republic of China
  - Central Military Commission
    - People's Liberation Army
      - People's Liberation Army Ground Force
        - 13th Army
          - 39th Division
            - 116th Regiment
            - 117th Regiment
        - 14th Army
          - 40th Division
            - 118th Regiment
        - Yunnan Simao Military Sub-region
          - 9th Border Defense Regiment
          - 10th Border Defense Regiment
          - 11th Border Defense Regiment

== Nationalist Forces ==
=== 1928-1947 ===
- Kuomintang
  - Republic of China
    - Military Affairs Commission
      - National Revolutionary Army

=== 1947-1950 ===
- Kuomintang
  - Republic of China
    - Ministry of National Defense
      - Republic of China Armed Forces

=== Post-war conflicts ===
- Republic of China (Taiwan)
  - Ministry of National Defense
    - Republic of China Armed Forces
      - Republic of China Army
        - Remnant Guerrilla Forces on the Mainland
        - Yunnan Anti-Communist National Salvation Army (Note: Formally dissolved in 1954 but remained active until 1961)
          - 1st Army (Mengwa)
          - 2nd Army (Suoyong)
          - 3rd Army (Laidong)
          - 4th Army (Mengma)
          - 5th Army (Menglong)
