= Liu Xiaowu =

- 刘小午
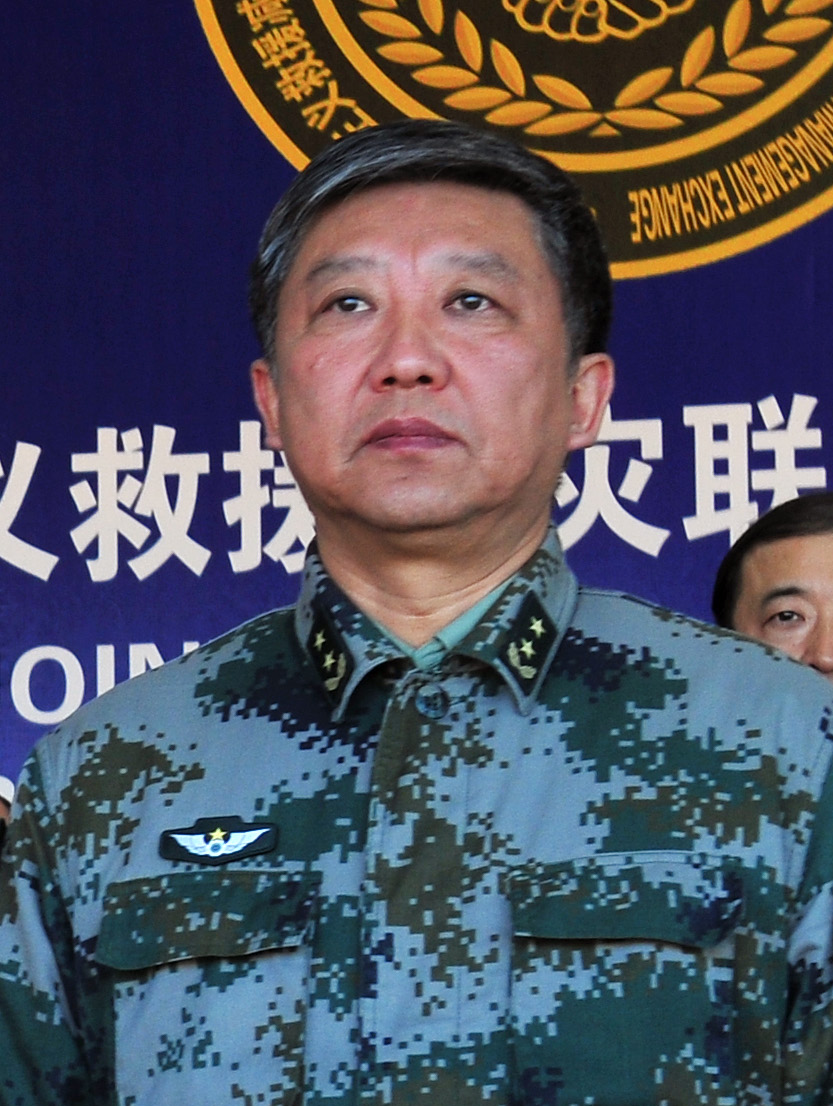
- Liu in 2016

Commander of the Southern Theater Command Ground Force
- In office January 2016 – January 2017
- Preceded by: New title
- Succeeded by: Zhang Jian

Chief of Staff of the Guangzhou Military Region
- In office December 2014 – December 2015
- Preceded by: Jia Xiaowei
- Succeeded by: Position revoked

Personal details
- Born: January 1960 (age 66) Xiong County, Hebei, China
- Party: Chinese Communist Party

Military service
- Allegiance: People's Republic of China
- Branch/service: People's Liberation Army Ground Force
- Years of service: 1976–president
- Rank: Lieutenant general
- Unit: 41st Group Army; 42nd Group Army
- Commands: Guangzhou Military Region; SouthernTheater Command Ground Force

Chinese name
- Simplified Chinese: 刘小午
- Traditional Chinese: 劉小午
Transcriptions
Standard Mandarin
- Hanyu Pinyin: Liú Xiǎowǔ

Liu Xiaowu (Chinese: 刘小午; born January 1960) is a lieutenant general in the People's Liberation Army of China.

== Biography ==
Liu was born in Xiong County, Hebei, in January 1960.

Liu enlisted in the People's Liberation Army (PLA) in 1976. In his early years, he served in the Xizang Military District, and later served in the Guangzhou Military Region for a long time.

Xiang became chief of staff of the 41st Group Army in 2007, and served until 2010, when he was appointed commander. He was chosen as commander of the 42nd Group Army in 2013. In December 2014, he succeeded Jia Xiaowei as chief of staff of the Guangzhou Military Region, serving in that position from 2014 to 2016. He was commissioned as deputy commander of the Southern Theater Command in January 2016, concurrently serving as commander of the Southern Theater Command Ground Force. He was promoted to the rank of lieutenant general (zhongjiang) in July 2016.

In January 2017, Xiang was assigned to Western Theater Command and commissioned as deputy commander.

Military offices
Preceded by Jia Xiaowei	Commander of the 41st Group Army; 2010–2013	Succeeded by Li Qiaoming
Preceded by You Haitao	Commander of the 42nd Group Army; 2013–2014	Succeeded by Zhu Xiaohui
Preceded by Jia Xiaowei	Chief of Staff of the Guangzhou Military Region; 2014–2015	Succeeded by Position revoked
New title	Commander of the Southern Theater Command Ground Force; 2016–2017	Succeeded by Zhang Jian
