= Yin Hongxing =

Chinese general

- 尹红星

Political Commissar of the Southern Theater Command Ground Force
- In office July 2024 – June 2026
- Commander: Hu Zhongqiang
- Preceded by: Fang Yongxiang

Political Commissar of the Tibet Military Region
- In office December 2021 – July 2024
- Commander: Wang Kai
- Preceded by: Zhang Xuejie
- Succeeded by: Yuan Honggang

Political Commissar of the 71st Group Army
- In office May 2018 – December 2021
- Commander: Li Zhonglin
- Preceded by: Xu Deqing
- Succeeded by: Huang Chaohui

Personal details
- Born: March 1967 (age 59) Changyuan, Henan, China
- Party: Chinese Communist Party

Military service
- Allegiance: People's Republic of China
- Branch/service: People's Liberation Army Ground Force
- Years of service: ?-present
- Rank: Lieutenant General
- Unit: 71st Group Army Tibet Military Region Southern Theater Command Ground Force

Chinese name
- Simplified Chinese: 尹红星
- Traditional Chinese: 尹紅星
Transcriptions
Standard Mandarin
- Hanyu Pinyin: Yǐn Hóngxīng

Yin Hongxing (Chinese: 尹红星; born March 1967) is a lieutenant general (zhongjiang) of the People's Liberation Army (PLA). Currently he serves as the political commissar of the Souther Theater Command Ground Force, replacing Fang Yongxiang (Chinese: 方永祥), in office from July 2024 to June 2026.

== Biography ==
Yin Hongxing, born in Changyuan, Henan, in March 1967 and served as political commissar of Unit 71352 ("Tiger Division") of the former Jinan Military Region. In 2016, he was transferred to the deputy secretary of the Army Discipline Inspection Commission of the Southern Theater Command. In May 2018 he got redeployed as the political commissar of the 71st Group Army which is part of the Eastern Theater Command and stationed in Xuzhou, replacing Xu Deqing. In December 2021 Yin Hongxing got promoted to the political commissar of the Tibet Military Region. In July 2024 he was back at the Southern Theater Command, serving as the Ground Forces political commissar and replacing Fang Yongxiang.

Yin Hongxing was promoted to the rank of major general in July 2017. In December 2021, he got promoted to the rank of lieutenant general.

On June 26 2026, the Standing Committee of the National People's Congress decided to remove Lieutenant General Yin Hongxing from the 14th National People's Congress.

Military offices
Preceded by Xu Deqing	Political Commissar of the 71st Group Army; 2018-2021	Succeeded by Huang Chaohui
Preceded by Zhang Xuejie	Political Commissar of the Tibet Military Region; 2021-2024	Succeeded by Yuan Honggang
Preceded by Fang Yongxiang	Political Commissar of the Southern Theater Command Ground Force; 2024-2026	Succeeded by TBA
