= 129th Division (People's Republic of China) =

125th Division (1948–52) 125th Infantry Division (1952–60) 125th Army Division (1960–64) Border Defense Division of Guangzhou Military Region (1964–67) 220th Army Division (1967–68) 129th Army Division (168–85) Tank Brigade, 54th Army (1985–98) Armored Brigade, 20th Army(1998–2012) 13th Armored Brigade (2012–17)
- Active: 1948.11 - 2017.4
- Country: People's Republic of China
- Branch: People's Liberation Army
- Type: Brigade
- Role: Armored
- Part of: 20th Army
- Garrison/HQ: Xiaochang, Hubei
- Engagements: Chinese Civil War, Korean War, Vietnam War, Sino-Vietnamese War

The 125th Division was a division deployed by the People's Republic of China during the Chinese Civil War and the Korean War. After series of redesignations and conversions, the division ends its fate as 13th Armored Brigade in April 2017.

== History ==
The 125th Division (Chinese: 第125师) was created in November 1948 under the Regulation of the Redesignations of All Organizations and Units of the Army, issued by Central Military Commission on November 1, 1948, basing on the 14th Division, 5th Column of Fourth Field Army. Its history could be traced to Tonghua Detachment of Liaodong Military District, formed in November 1945.

In the composition of 42nd Corps it took part in the Chinese Civil War, including the Liaoshen Campaign and Pingjin Campaign.

In October 1950 the division entered Korea as a part of the People's Volunteer Army (Chinese People's Volunteers (CPV) or Chinese Communist Forces (CCF)) with a standard strength of approximately 10,000 men. It was a component of the 42nd Army, consisting of the 373rd, 374th, and 375th Regiments. During its deployment in Korea Artillery Regiment, 125th Division was activated.

In November 1952 the division returned from Korea and was redesignated as 125th Infantry Division(Chinese: 步兵第125师), activating its tank regiment.

By September 1953 the division was composed of:

- 373rd Infantry Regiment;
- 374th Infantry Regiment;
- 375th Infantry Regiment;
- 505th Artillery Regiment;
- 330th Tank Self-Propelled Artillery Regiment.

In April 1960 the division was redesignated as 125th Army Division(Chinese: 陆军第125师).

In December 1962, 330th Tank Self-Propelled Artillery Regiment was transferred to 200th Army Division.

In August 1964 the division was inactivated. By the same time Border Defense Division of Guagnzhou Military Region(Chinese: 广州军区边防师) was activated in Tianyang, Guangxi from headquarters of the 129th Army Division, 373rd, 375th infantry regiments, and 505th Artillery Regiment. All infantry battalions of 373rd and 375rd infantry regiments were transferred to Guangdong Provincial Military District's control, and 374th Infantry Regiment was transferred to 126th Army Division.

The Border Defense Division was composed of:

- 1st Infantry Regiment;
- 2nd Infantry Regiment;
- 3rd Infantry Regiment;
- Artillery Regiment (former 505th);
- three independent infantry battalions.

In early 1965 Headquarters, Border Defense Division moved to Tiandong. Guangxi.

In February 1967 the division was redesignated as 220th Army Division(Chinese: 陆军第220师). All its regiments were redesignated as follows:

- 658th Infantry Regiment (former 1st);
- 659th Infantry Regiment (former 2nd);
- 660th Infantry Regiment (former 3rd);
- 590th Artillery Regiment.

In July 1968, 659th Infantry Regiment, 220th Army Division (Military Unit 6912) took part in the military operations against Red Guards faction "Guangxi April 22 Revolutionary Action Command" in Nanning, Guangxi. In the operation at least 3911 were killed.

In August 1968, 658th Infantry Regiment, 220th Army Division (Military Unit 6911) took part in the military operations against Red Guards faction "July 29 Corps Army" (a branch of "April 22") in Fengshan County, killing at least 1016 civilians.

In September 1968, the division was transferred to newly activated 43rd Army Corps and redesignated as 129th Army Division(Chinese: 陆军第129师). All its regiments were redesignated as follows:

- 385th Infantry Regiment (former 658th);
- 386th Infantry Regiment (former 659th);
- 387th Infantry Regiment (former 660th);
- (???) Artillery Regiment (former 590th, possibly dropped its number in August 1969).

The division then moved to Guiyang, Guizhou for "three supporting and two militarization" missions.

In February 1973 the division moved to Nanyang, Henan.

In February to March 1979 the division took part in the Sino-Vietnamese War under the command of 42nd Army Corps. During the operations the division neutralized 875 enemies at the cost of 574 casualties.

In July 1984, Reconnaissance Company, 129th Army Division took part in the Battle of Laoshan as 4th Company, 2nd Reconnaissance Group. After the battle the company received the honorific title of "Heroic Reconnaissance Company".

== Armored Brigade ==
In October 1985 the 129th Army Division was inactivated. Headquarters. 129th Army Division was merged with 44th Tank Regiment, 11th Tank Division as Tank Brigade, 54th Army(Chinese: 第54集团军坦克旅).

In 1998, the brigade was exchanged with 11th Tank Division and became Armored Brigade, 20th Army(Chinese: 第20集团军装甲旅).

In 2012, the brigade received the designation of 13th Armored Brigade(Chinese: 装甲第13旅).

In April 2017, the brigade was officially inactivated.

Before its inactivation the brigade stationed in Xiaochang, Hubei.
