= 8th Division (1st Formation) (People's Republic of China) =

Former Chinese military unit

8th Division (1949–52)
- Active: February 1949–June 1952
- Country: People's Republic of China
- Allegiance: Chinese Communist Party
- Branch: People's Liberation Army Ground Force
- Type: Division
- Role: Infantry
- Part of: 3rd Corps
- Engagements: Chinese Civil War

The 8th Division (Chinese: 第8师) was created in February 1949 under the Regulation of the Redesignations of All Organizations and Units of the Army, issued by Central Military Commission on November 1, 1948, basing on the 3rd Independent Brigade, 3rd Column of the PLA Northwestern Field Army. Its history can be traced to the 5th Independent Brigade, 3rd Column of Jinsui Field Army, formed in August 1945.

The division is part of 3rd Corps. Under the flag of 8th division it took part in the Chinese Civil War. In June 1952 it was disbanded and absorbed into the 2nd Division from the 1st Corps. The division HQ was converted as HQ, 27th Aviation Division of the People's Liberation Army Air Force.

As of disbandment division was composed of:

- 22nd Regiment(disbanded and absorbed into the Air Force and 4th Regiment of 2nd Division);
- 23rd Regiment(later renamed as 5th Regiment, 2nd Division);
- 24th Regiment(later renamed as Artillery, 2nd Division).
