= Bai Lü =

Chinese military officer

- 白吕

Political Commissar of the PLA Academy of Military Science
- In office December 2020 – June 2023
- President: Yang Xuejun
- Preceded by: Fang Xiang
- Succeeded by: Ling Huanxin

Personal details
- Born: September 1961 (age 64–65) Ying County, Shanxi, China
- Party: Chinese Communist Party
- Education: Shanxi University; PLA National Defence University

Military service
- Allegiance: People's Republic of China
- Branch/service: People's Liberation Army Ground Force
- Years of service: 1984–present
- Rank: Lieutenant general

Chinese name
- Simplified Chinese: 白吕
- Traditional Chinese: 白呂
Transcriptions
Standard Mandarin
- Hanyu Pinyin: Bái Lǚ

Bai Lü (Chinese: 白吕; born September 1961) is a lieutenant general in the People's Liberation Army of China. He was a member of the 19th Central Commission for Discipline Inspection (CCDI). He was a representative of the 19th National Congress of the Chinese Communist Party.

== Biography ==
Bai was born in Ying County, Shanxi, in September 1961. After resumption of college entrance examination in 1979, he entered Shanxi University, majoring in philosophy.

He joined the Chinese Communist Party (CCP) in August 1983, and enlisted in the People's Liberation Army (PLA) in February 1984. He served in the Shanxi Military District and the Beijing Military Region from 1984 to 1993, and the Nanjing Military Region from 1993 to 2005. He was made political commissar of the 1st Division of the 1st Group Army in August 2005. In April 2008, he was assigned as director of Political Department of the 12th Group Army, and was elevated to political commissar in February 2011. He was recalled to the original 1st Group Army as political commissar in January 2013, succeeding Wang Ping. In July 2015, he was given the position of deputy political commissar of the Chengdu Military Region.

He was commissioned as political commissar of the Southern Theater Command Ground Force in February 2016, concurrently serving as deputy political commissar of the Southern Theater Command. He was designated by the Central Military Commission in December 2020 to replace Fang Xiang as political commissar of the PLA Academy of Military Science.

He was promoted to the rank of major general (shaojiang) in July 2009 and lieutenant general (zhongjiang) in July 2016.

Military offices
Preceded by Miao Hua	Political Commissar of the 12th Group Army; 2011–2013	Succeeded by Zhang Xuejie
Preceded by Wang Ping	Political Commissar of the 1st Group Army; 2013–2015	Succeeded by Qin Shutong
New title	Political Commissar of the Southern Theater Command Ground Force; 2016–2020	Succeeded by Wang Donoghai
Preceded by Fang Xiang	Political Commissar of the PLA Academy of Military Science; 2020–2023	Succeeded by Ling Huanxin
