= 7th Armed Police Division =

3rd Army Division (1969) 7th Army Division (1969–85) 7th Infantry Division (1985–96) 7th Armed Police Division (1996–2018)
- Active: 1969.5 - 2018
- Country: People's Republic of China
- Branch: People's Armed Police
- Type: Gendarmerie
- Role: Civil Defense, Rapid reaction force
- Size: Division
- Part of: People's Armed Police
- Garrison/HQ: Ili, Xinjiang
- Engagements: Xinjiang conflict

The 3rd Army Division (Chinese: 陆军第3师) (2nd Formation) was created in May 1969 from Beijing and Shenyang Military Region and soon sent to Ili, Xinjiang under the direct control of Xinjiang Military Region. The division was then composed of:

- 7th Infantry Regiment;
- 8th Infantry Regiment;
- 9th Infantry Regiment;
- 313th Artillery Regiment.

In December 1969 the division was renamed as 7th Army Division, while former 7th Army Division renamed as new 3rd Army Division.

The re-formation and re-designation of several army divisions in Xinjiang showed apparent evidence that there might be plans to re-activate 2nd Army Corps and 3rd Army Corps, even 4th Army Corps of the PLA. For unknown reasons these corps were not formed at last.

By then the division was composed of:

- 19th Infantry Regiment (former 7th);
- 20th Infantry Regiment (former 8th);
- 21st Infantry Regiment (former 9th);
- Artillery Regiment (former 313th).

In 1985 the division was renamed as 7th Infantry Division (Chinese: 步兵第7师), becoming a Northern Infantry Division, Catalogue B unit.

In 1996 the division was transferred to the People's Armed Police and renamed as 7th Armed Police Division (Chinese: 武警第7师).

The Artillery Regiment, 7th Infantry Division was re-organized and renamed as 706th Regiment, 7th Armed Police Division. All artillery battalions in infantry regiments were also re-organized as the 4th mobile battalion of the regiments. Now the division is composed of:

- 19th Armed Police Regiment (Chinese: 武警第19团);
- 20th Armed Police Regiment (Chinese: 武警第20团);
- 21st Armed Police Regiment (Chinese: 武警第21团);
- 706th Armed Police Regiment (Chinese: 武警第706团).

The division is stationed in Ili, Xinjiang to crack down on the local population and to suppress resistance efforts.

In 2018 the division was merged into the People's Armed Police Xinjiang Contingent.
