= Informationised war =

Informationised war (informatised war) is a combination of and evolution in warfare from pre-existing ones such as network-centric, cyber, psychological, electronic and information warfare, and integrating all the "opportunities and technologies provided by the Information Age" (Note: "Informationisation "entails embracing all the opportunities and technologies the Information Age can offer and integrating them into military systems".") into all domains, systems and aspects of modern warfare. China's Defense White Papers of 2004, 2006, 2015, and 2019 all emphasis and discuss "informationization" of its military; the country aims for a fully "informationised" force by 2049.
