= Sun Sijing =

Chinese general and politician

- 孙思敬

Political Commissar of People's Armed Police
- In office December 2014 – January 2017
- Preceded by: Xu Yaoyuan
- Succeeded by: Zhu Shengling

Personal details
- Born: December 1951 (age 74) Qingdao, Shandong, China
- Party: Chinese Communist Party

Military service
- Allegiance: People's Republic of China
- Branch/service: People's Liberation Army Ground Force; People's Armed Police
- Years of service: 1969–2017
- Rank: General

Sun Sijing (Chinese: 孙思敬; born December 1951) is a retired general of the People's Liberation Army who served as Political Commissar of the People's Armed Police.

== Biography ==
Sun Sijing was born in Qingdao, Shandong in December 1951. He joined the People's Liberation Army (PLA) in 1969, and began work as a political liaison in an artillery force. He rose through the ranks serving in mostly political roles - that is, he presumably did not have much combat experience. In 1999 he became political commissar of the PLA's First Medical University, and by October 2002 became political commissar of the 301 Military Hospital, the top hospital of the PLA and often used as a treatment facility for top civilian leaders as well. In 2005 he became deputy political commissar of the Logistics Department. In December 2010 he became political commissar of the PLA Academy of Military Science. In July 2013 he was promoted to the rank of General, the highest non-wartime rank in the PLA. In December 2014 he became political commissar of the People's Armed Police.

Sun was a member of the 17th Central Commission for Discipline Inspection and of the 18th Central Committee of the Chinese Communist Party.

Military offices
Preceded by Fan Yinrui	Political Commissar of the 301 Military Hospital; 2002–2003	Succeeded by Guo Xuheng
Preceded by Liu Yuan	Political Commissar of the PLA Academy of Military Science; 2010–2014	Succeeded by Xu Yaoyuan
Preceded by Xu Yaoyuan	Political Commissar of the People's Armed Police; 2014–2017	Succeeded by Zhu Shengling
