= Fang Xiang =

- 方向

Political Commissar of the PLA Academy of Military Science
- In office June 2017 – December 2020
- President: Yang Xuejun
- Preceded by: Xu Yaoyuan
- Succeeded by: Bai Lü

Director of Political Department of the People's Liberation Army Rocket Force
- In office December 2015 – June 2017
- Preceded by: New title
- Succeeded by: Cheng Jian

Director of Political Department of the People's Armed Police
- In office July 2015 – December 2015
- Preceded by: Yao Ligong
- Succeeded by: Yan Xiaodong

Personal details
- Born: October 1957 (age 68) Chun'an County, Zhejiang, China
- Party: Chinese Communist Party

Military service
- Allegiance: People's Republic of China
- Branch/service: People's Liberation Army Ground Force
- Years of service: ?–2020
- Rank: Lieutenant general

Fang Xiang (Chinese: 方向; pinyin: Fāng Xiàng; born October 1957) is a lieutenant general in the People's Liberation Army of China. He was an alternate of the 19th Central Committee of the Chinese Communist Party.

== Biography ==
Fang was born in Chun'an County, Zhejiang, in October 1957. He was deputy secretary-general of the Office of the People's Liberation Army General Political Department in 2010 and then head of its Organization Division in 2013. In July 2015, he was promoted to become director of Political Department of the People's Armed Police (PAP), a position he held until December 2015. On 31 December 2015, he was made director of the newly founded Political Department of the People's Liberation Army Rocket Force (PLARF), and served until June 2017, when he was appointed political commissar of the PLA Academy of Military Science.

He was promoted to the rank of major general (shaojiang) in 2010 and lieutenant general (zhongjiang) in August 2016.

Military offices
Preceded by Qin Shengxiang	Head of Organization Division of the People's Liberation Army General Political Department; 2012–2015	Succeeded by Position revoked
Preceded by Yao Ligong	Director of Political Department of the People's Armed Police; 2015	Succeeded by Yan Xiaodong
New title	Director of Political Department of the People's Liberation Army Rocket Force; 2015–2017	Succeeded by Cheng Jian
Preceded by Xu Yaoyuan	Political Commissar of the PLA Academy of Military Science; 2017–2020	Succeeded by Bai Lü
