= General Yu =

General Yu may refer to:

- Yu Beichen (born 1968), a major general in the Republic of China Army
- Yu Daqing (born 1957), a lieutenant-general in the People's Liberation Army of China
- Yu Jae Hung (1921–2011), Republic of Korea (ROK) military officer
- Yu Jishi (1904–1990), Chinese Nationalist military general
- Yu Jin (died 221), Chinese military general
- Yu Linxiang (born 1945) is a retired general (shangjiang) who served as political commissar of the People's Republic of China
- Yu Mingtao (1917–2017), the first Auditor General of National Audit Office of the People's Republic of China
- Yu Qingjiang (born 1963), a lieutenant general (zhong jiang) of the People's Liberation Army Air Force (PLAAF) of China
- Yu Qiuli (1914–1999), Chinese Communist army officer
- Yu Xuezhong (1890–1964), a general in the armed forces of the Republic of China
- Yu Yi (305–345), Chinese military general of the Jin dynasty (266–420)
- Yu Yunwen (1110–1174), Chinese official and general of the Song dynasty
- Yu Zhenwu (1931–2023), a general of the Chinese People's Liberation Army Air Force (PLAAF)
- Yu Zhongfu (born 1956), a general of the People's Liberation Army Air Force (PLAAF) of China

== See also ==
- You Taizhong, a general of the Chinese People's Liberation Army
