= 1st Amphibious Mechanized Infantry Division =

1st Division (1949–55) 1st Infantry Division (1955–60) 1st Army Division (1960–85) 1st Infantry Division (1985–2000) 1st Amphibious Mechanized Infantry Division (2000–17) 1st Amphibious Combined Arms Brigade (2017–)
- Active: 1949.2 – present
- Country: China
- Branch: People's Liberation Army Ground Force; People's Volunteer Army (formerly)
- Type: Amphibious Combined Arms, Amphibious Mechanized Infantry
- Size: Brigade
- Part of: 74th Group Army (1st Brigade); 72nd Group Army (5th Brigade)
- Garrison/HQ: Hangzhou, Zhejiang
- Engagements: Chinese Civil War, Korean War, Vietnam War, Sino-Vietnamese War
- Decorations: Red Army Division

The 1st Amphibious Combined Arms Brigade, formerly the 1st Amphibious Mechanized Infantry Division, is a military formation of the People's Liberation Army Ground Force of the People's Republic of China.

== History ==
The 1st Division (Chinese: 第1师) was created in February 1949 under the Regulation of the Redesignations of All Organizations and Units of the Army, issued by Central Military Commission on November 1, 1948, basing on the 386th Brigade, 1st Column of the PLA Northwest Field Army. Its history can be traced to the 2nd Army of the Chinese Workers' and Peasants' Red Army, formed in July 1930.

The division is part of 1st Corps (now 1st Army). Under the flag of 1st division it took part in the Chinese Civil War. In 1952 it absorbed the 3rd Division from the same Corps.

=== Post-war ===
In February 1953 the division entered Korea to took part in Korean War under the command of the Corps. Then in 1955, it was renamed as the 1st Infantry Division (Chinese: 步兵第1师). Since then it became a part of the People's Volunteer Army until 1958, where it moved to Kaifeng, Henan province with the Corps HQ. It was renamed again in 1960 as the 1st Army Division (Chinese: 陆军第1师). In January 1961 it became one of the first ten combat alert divisions of the army, which made it a "big" division under PLA glossaries, as a fully staffed and equipped division. In 1962 the division was designated as a "Northern" unit, Catalogue A. the division was shortly moved to Fujian province for an emergency alert deployment with the Corps HQ. In 1968 the 206th Tank Self-Propelled Artillery Regiment was detached from the division and formed the later 41st Tank Regiment of the 11th Tank Division. The division was basically not affected during the army re-designation in December 1969. Its 301st Artillery Regiment was renamed as Artillery Regiment, 1st Army Division. In the 1970s the division then maintained as an Army Division, Catalogue A unit. In 1975 the division moved to Zhejiang Province with the Corps HQ to replace 20th Army Corps. Since then the division is stationed in Hangzhou, Zhejiang Province. In 1984 the division took part in the Battle of Laoshan with the Corps HQ. In 1985 the division was converted to a motorized division, renamed as the 1st Infantry Division (Chinese: 步兵第1师). The division then maintained as a Northern Motorized Infantry Division, Catalogue A unit. The Tank Regiment of 1st Army Corps attached to the division, and its Anti-Air Artillery Battalion expanded to a regiment.

=== Current history (1998–present) ===
Between 1998 and 2000 the division was further converted to an amphibious mechanized division, renamed as the 1st Amphibious Mechanized Infantry Division (Chinese: 两栖机械化步兵第1师). In April 2017 the division was divided into two combined arms brigades: the 1st Amphibious Combined Arms Brigade (Chinese: 两栖合成第1旅) and the 5th Amphibious Combined Arms Brigade (Chinese: 两栖合成第5旅). The 1st was transferred to the 74th Group Army (formerly the 42nd Group Army), while the 5th was still under the 1st Group Army, which currently known as the 72nd Group Army.

== Structure ==
=== 1952 ===
- 1st Regiment;
- 2nd Regiment;
- 3rd Regiment;
- 206th Tank Self-Propelled Artillery Regiment (former 8th Regiment, 3rd Division);
- 301st Artillery Regiment (former 7th Regiment, 3rd Division);

=== 1985 ===
- 1st Motorized Infantry Regiment;
- 2nd Motorized Infantry Regiment;
- 3rd Motorized Infantry Regiment;
- Tank Regiment (former Tank Regiment, 1st Army Corps);
- Artillery Regiment;
- Anti-Air Artillery Regiment.

=== Pre 2017 ===
- Division HQ
- 1st Amphibious Mechanized Infantry Regiment
- 2nd Amphibious Mechanized Infantry Regiment
- Amphibious Armored Regiment (former Tank Regiment, 1st Infantry Division)
- Artillery Regiment
- Air Defense Regiment
