= 43rd Corps (People's Republic of China) =

43rd Corps (1949-1961) 43rd Army Corps (1968-1985)
- Military Banner
- Active: 1945 - 1961; 1968 - 1985
- Country: China
- Branch: People's Liberation Army
- Part of: Wuhan Military Region
- Garrison/HQ: Luoyang, Henan (1968-85)
- Engagements: World War II; Chinese Civil War; Vietnam War; Sino-Vietnamese War

Commanders
- Notable commanders: Hong Xuezhi; Li Zuopeng; Long Shujin

The 43rd Army Corps was one of the formations of the People's Liberation Army Ground Forces.

== History ==
=== First Formation ===
From September to November 1945, according to the strategic plan of the Central Committee of the Chinese Communist Party to develop into the northeast and strive for control of the northeast, the 7th Division of the Shandong Military Region of the 8th Route Army with more than 8,000 men and the troops of the Bohai Military Region with more than 5,000 men (organized into 3 regiments) advanced into the Northeast. Later, they advanced to the area west of Harbin and merged with the 19th Brigade of the Jijie-Liao Military District under the Jinchaji Military Region, which had entered the Northeast first, to form the 7th Division of the Northeast Democratic Alliance Army. The 19th Brigade of the Jijie-Liao Military Region, the 7th Division of the Shandong Military Region and the Bohai Military Region were reorganized into the 19th Brigade of the 7th Division (later reorganized into the Guard Regiment of the Division) and the 20th and 21st Brigades in turn. In January 1948, the formation was designated as the 6th Column of the People's Liberation Army of the Northeast(Chinese: 东北人民解放军第6纵队). In September-November, the column took part in the battle of Jinzhou and the battle to destroy the "Westward Corps" of the ROC Army in western Liaoning.

In November 1948, according to the Order on the Unification of the Army Organization and Unit Designations issued by the Central Military Commission, the Sixth Column of the Northeast Field Army was renamed the 43rd Corps (Chinese: 第43军) of the Chinese People's Liberation Army and remained under the Northeast Field Army.

Hong Xuezhi was the army commander (later Li Zuopeng and Long Shujin), Lai Chuanzhu was the political commissar (later Zhang Jiming), Yang Guofu and Li Zuopeng were the deputy army commander (after Long Shujin, Yan Jiesan and Yuan Kui), Liu Qiren was the deputy political commissar (after Yuan Kui), Lei Zhen and Huang Yiping were the chief of staff (after Feng Jing), Deng Fei was the director of the political department (after Yuan Kui and then Liu Jinping).

The 16th, 17th, 18th divisions and the newly transferred 6th independent division were renamed 127th, 128th, 129th and 156th divisions in turn, with a total of more than 63,000 men.

The corps' main force was the 128th Division, which stayed on Hainan Island, and the main force returned to the Leizhou Peninsula to fight bandits. In October, the 132nd Division from the 44th Corps was transferred to the 43rd Corps. in August 1961, the 43rd Corps was inactivated and all subordinate units were transferred to the Hainan Military Region, except the 127th Army Division, which was reorganized into the Independent Division of the Army of the Guangzhou Military Region.

=== Second Formation ===
In September 1968, the 43rd Army Corps (Chinese: 陆军第43军) was reactivated by Guangzhou Military Region, with the 127th Army Division, 128th Army Division and the 220th Army Division.

On October 17, 1969, the army corps moved to Luoyang, Henan Province, under the leadership of Wuhan Military Region (the 129th Division stayed in Guiyang to "support the left" before returned to the formation in January 1973).

From February 17 to March 16, 1979, the army corps took part in the Sino-Vietnamese War. The army corps was heavily engaged in the Battle of Cao Bang.

On March 1, 1981, according to the instructions of the Central Military Commission and the Wuhan Military Region, the 43rd Army Corps underwent a testbed formation of a combined arms army. The 2nd Artillery Division, 11th Tank Division and 63rd Anti-Aircraft Artillery Division of Wuhan Military Region were reorganized under the army corps. 43rd Army Corps was then composed of three army divisions, 127th, 128th and 129th, and three military divisions, 2nd Artillery Division, 11th Tank Division and 63rd Artillery Division, as well as direct subordinations i.e. the anti-aircraft artillery regiment, the artillery regiment, the tank regiment and the 150th Central Hospital.

== Organization ==
Before its inactivation in 1985, the 43rd Army Corps was composed of:

- Subordinates
  - Anti-Aircraft Artillery Regiment
  - Artillery Regiment
  - Tank Regiment
  - 150th Central Hospital
- 127th Army Division
- 128th Army Division
- 129th Army Division
- 2nd Artillery Division
- 11th Tank Division
- 63rd Anti-Aircraft Artillery Division
