= Xu Yaoyuan =

- 许耀元

Political Commissar of the PLA Academy of Military Sciences
- In office December 2014 – January 2017
- Preceded by: Sun Sijing
- Succeeded by: Fang Xiang

Political Commissar of the People's Armed Police
- In office July 2010 – December 2014
- Preceded by: Yu Linxiang
- Succeeded by: Sun Sijing

Personal details
- Born: December 1952 (age 73) Wujiang County, Jiangsu, China
- Party: Chinese Communist Party

Military service
- Allegiance: People's Republic of China
- Branch/service: People's Liberation Army Ground Force
- Years of service: 1969–2017
- Rank: General

Chinese name
- Simplified Chinese: 许耀元
- Traditional Chinese: 許耀元
Transcriptions
Standard Mandarin
- Hanyu Pinyin: Xǔ Yàoyuán

Xu Yaoyuan (Chinese: 许耀元; born December 1952) is a retired general of the Chinese People's Liberation Army (PLA). He served as Political Commissar of the PLA Academy of Military Science and was a member of the 18th Central Committee of the Chinese Communist Party.

== Biography ==
Xu was born in Wujiang County, Jiangsu in December 1952. He enlisted in the PLA in 1969, and served in the 23rd Army. In 1997 he entered the PLA General Political Department (GPD); in 2004 he was put in charge of the cadres department of the GPD. In 2007 he became assistant to the director of the Department. In 2010 he attained the rank of lieutenant general, and became Political Commissar of the People's Armed Police. In July 2012 he was promoted to full general. In December 2014, Xu replaced General Sun Sijing as Political Commissar of the PLA Academy of Military Science.

Military offices
Preceded by Yu Linxiang	Political Commissar of the People's Armed Police; 2010–2014	Succeeded by Sun Sijing
Preceded by Sun Sijing	Political Commissar of the PLA Academy of Military Sciences; 2014–2017	Succeeded by Fang Xiang
