= Zhu Shengling =

Chinese military officer

- 朱生岭

Political Commissar of the Central Theater Command
- In office March 2019 – January 2022
- Preceded by: Yin Fanglong
- Succeeded by: Xu Deqing

Political Commissar of the People's Armed Police
- In office January 2017 – March 2019
- Commander: Wang Ning
- Preceded by: Sun Sijing
- Succeeded by: An Zhaoqing

Political Commissar of the CMC National Defense Mobilization Department
- In office January 2016 – January 2017
- Preceded by: New position
- Succeeded by: Liu Jiaguo

Personal details
- Born: November 1957 (age 68) Dongtai, Jiangsu
- Party: Chinese Communist Party

Military service
- Allegiance: People's Republic of China
- Branch/service: People's Liberation Army Ground Force
- Years of service: 1976–2022
- Rank: General

Chinese name
- Simplified Chinese: 朱生岭
- Traditional Chinese: 朱生嶺
Transcriptions
Standard Mandarin
- Hanyu Pinyin: Zhū Shēnglǐng

Zhu Shengling (Chinese: 朱生岭; born November 1957) is a general of the Chinese People's Liberation Army. He previously served as the Political Commissar of the Central Theater Command and the People's Armed Police.

== Biography ==
Zhu Shengling was born November 1957 in Dongtai, Jiangsu Province. He has a master's degree in military sciences.

Zhu spent most of career in the former Nanjing Military Region, serving successively as Director of the Political Department of the 31st Group Army, Political Commissar of the Fujian Military District, Political Commissar of the Shanghai Garrison Command, and Director of the Political Department of the Nanjing Military Region from December 2014.

During Central Military Commission chairman Xi Jinping's military reform in January 2016, Zhu was appointed the inaugural Political Commissar of the newly established National Defense Mobilization Department of the Central Military Commission, serving alongside director Sheng Bin. In August 2016, both Zhu and Sheng were promoted to the rank of lieutenant general (zhong jiang).

In January 2017, Zhu was appointed Political Commissar of the People's Armed Police, succeeding the retiring general Sun Sijing.

In January 2017, Zhu was appointed Political Commissar of the Central Theater Command, succeeding the retiring general Yin Fanlong.

In October 2017, he was elected a member of the 19th Central Committee of the Chinese Communist Party.

Military offices
Preceded by Miao Hua	Director of the Political Department of the 31st Group Army; 2005–2009	Succeeded by Zhang Xuejie
Preceded by Li Guangjin	Political Commissar of the Fujian Military District; 2009–2013	Succeeded by Cao Dexin
Preceded by Zhu Zhengping	Political Commissar of the Shanghai Garrison Command; 2013–2014	Succeeded by Ma Jiali
Preceded by Wu Changhai	Director of the Political Department of the Nanjing Military Region; 2014–2015	Succeeded by Position revoked
New title	Political Commissar of the CMC National Defense Mobilization Department; 2016–2017	Succeeded by Liu Jiaguo
Preceded by Sun Sijing	Political Commissar of the People's Armed Police; 2017–2019	Succeeded by An Zhaoqing
Preceded by Yin Fanglong	Political Commissar of the Central Theater Command; 2019–2022	Succeeded by Xu Deqing
