= 128th Armed Police Mobile Division =

128th Division (1949–1955) 128th Infantry Division (1955–1960) 128th Army Division (1960–1985) 128th Infantry Division (1985–96) 128th Armed Police Mobile Division (1996–2017)
- Active: 1948.11 – 2017
- Country: People's Republic of China
- Branch: People's Armed Police
- Type: Gendarmerie
- Size: Division
- Garrison/HQ: Gong County, Henan
- Engagements: Chinese Civil War, Vietnam War, Sino-Vietnamese War

The 128th Division (Chinese: 第128师) was a military formation of the People's Liberation Army, which was created in November 1948 under the Regulation of the Redesignations of All Organizations and Units of the Army, issued by the Central Military Commission on November 1, 1948, basing on the 17th Division, 6th Column of the Northeastern Field Army. Its origin can be traced back to the 3rd Detachment of the Shandong People's Anti-Japanese Guerilla Force of the Eighth Route Army, activated in June 1938.

The division was a part of the 43rd Corps and was composed of the 382nd, 383rd, and 384th Regiments.

In April 1950, the division participated in the Hainan Island Campaign along with the corps. After the campaign, the division garrisoned in Hainan island.

In January 1953, the 508th Artillery Regiment and the 333rd Tank Self-Propelled Artillery Regiment were activated and attached to the Division. By then the division was composed of:

- 382nd Regiment
- 383rd Regiment
- 384th Regiment
- 508th Artillery Regiment
- 333rd Tank Self-Propelled Artillery Regiment

In April 1960, the division was redesignated as the 128th Army Division (Chinese: 陆军第128师).

In January 1961, the division was put under the Hainan Military District's control after the disbandment of the 43rd Corps.

In October 1961, the division exchanged its 333rd Tank Self-Propelled Artillery Regiment with the 127th Army Division's 332nd Tank Self-Propelled Artillery Regiment.

In November 1964 the division moved to Huiyang, Guangdong and attached to the 42nd Army Corps; the 332nd Tank Self-Propelled Artillery Regiment left the division and maintained on Hainan Island.

In July 1968, the 43rd Army Corps was reactivated. The 128th Army Division then moved to Liuzhou, Guangxi and attached to the 43rd Army Corps.

In October 1968, the division moved to Gong County, Henan along with the army corps.

In June 1969, 508th Artillery Regiment was redesignated as the Artillery Regiment, 128th Army Division.

From February to March 1979, the division was deployed into the Sino-Vietnamese War along with the army corps. The division was mainly engaged in the Battle of Cao Bằng. The division returned to its barracks in April 1979.

In September 1985, the division was reconstituted as the 128th Infantry Division (Chinese: 步兵第128师) and transferred to the 20th Army's control after 43rd Army Corps' disbandment. The division maintained as a northern infantry division, category B. By then the division was composed of:

- 382nd Infantry Regiment
- 383rd Infantry Regiment
- 384th Infantry Regiment
- Artillery Regiment

In 1996, the division was transferred to People's Armed Police's control and redesignated as the 128th Armed Police Division (Chinese: 武警第128师), given the designation Unit 8680 and was headquartered in Gongyi, Zhengzhou. The division was then composed of:

- 382nd Armed Police Regiment, stationed in Yanshi district, Luoyang
- 383rd Armed Police Regiment, stationed in Ruzhou, Pingdingshan
- 384th Armed Police Regiment, stationed in Mengjin, Luoyang
- 708th Armed Police Regiment, stationed in Dengfeng, Zhengzhou

In 1998, the division was deployed to help in relief efforts during the 1998 China floods and in 2010 it was deployed to help protect Expo 2010 and the 2010 Asian Games.

In 2017 the division was merged into the 1st Mobile Contingent.
