= You Haitao =

- 尤海涛
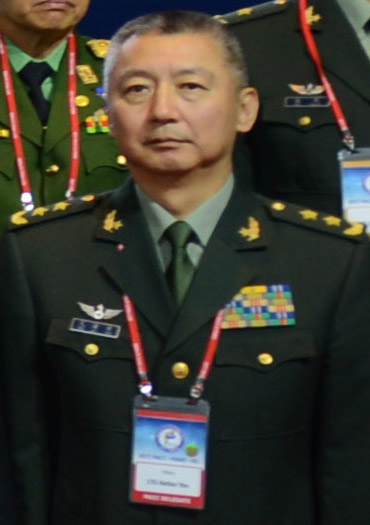
- You in 2017

Deputy Commander of the People's Liberation Army Ground Force
- In office 31 December 2015 – ?
- Commander: Li Zuocheng; Han Weiguo

Personal details
- Born: January 1958 (age 68) Guangshan County, Henan, China
- Party: Chinese Communist Party
- Parent: You Taizhong
- Education: Sun Yat-sen University

Military service
- Allegiance: People's Republic of China
- Branch/service: People's Liberation Army Ground Force
- Years of service: ?–2024
- Rank: Lieutenant general

Chinese name
- Simplified Chinese: 尤海涛
- Traditional Chinese: 尤海濤
Transcriptions
Standard Mandarin
- Hanyu Pinyin: Yóu Hǎitāo

You Haitao (Chinese: 尤海涛; born January 1958) is a lieutenant general in the People's Liberation Army of China.

== Biography ==
You was born in Guangshan County, Henan, in January 1958, to You Taizhong, a founding major general of the People's Republic of China.

In 2002, he became deputy commander of the 42nd Group Army, rising to commander in September 2007. He was promoted to the rank of major general (shaojiang) in July 2004. In 2008, he was a delegate to the 11th National People's Congress. He was elevated to deputy commander of the Nanjing Military Region in July 2013. He attained the rank of lieutenant general (zhongjiang) in July 2014. On 31 December 2015, he was commissioned as deputy commander of the People's Liberation Army Ground Force.

== Downfall ==
On 29 November 2024, You was deprived of his qualification as a delegate to the 14th National People's Congress after being placed under investigation for "serious violations of laws and regulations".

Military offices
Preceded by Liu Yuejun	Commander of the 42nd Group Army; 2002–2007	Succeeded by Liu Xiaowu
