= 3rd Division (1st Formation) (People's Republic of China) =

3rd Division (1949–52)
- Active: 1949.2 - 1952.6
- Country: People's Republic of China
- Branch: People's Liberation Army
- Type: Division
- Role: Infantry
- Part of: 1st Corps
- Engagements: Chinese Civil War

The 3rd Division (Chinese: 第3师)(1st Formation) was created in February 1949 under the Regulation of the Redesignations of All Organizations and Units of the Army, issued by Central Military Commission on November 1, 1948, basing on the 7th Independent Brigade, 1st Column of the PLA Northwestern Field Army. Its history can be traced to the 7th Independent Brigade, Jinsui Military District, formed in December 1947.

The division is part of 1st Corps (now 1st Army). Under the flag of 3rd division it took part in the Chinese Civil War. In June 1952 it was disbanded and absorbed into the 1st Division from the same Corps.

As of disbandment division was composed of:

- 7th Regiment(later renamed as 301st Artillery Regiment, 1st Infantry Division);
- 8th Regiment(later renamed as 206th Tank Self-Propelled Artillery Regiment, 1st Division);
- 9th Regiment(later being absorbed into the Air Force).
