= Zhang Jian (lieutenant general) =

- 张践
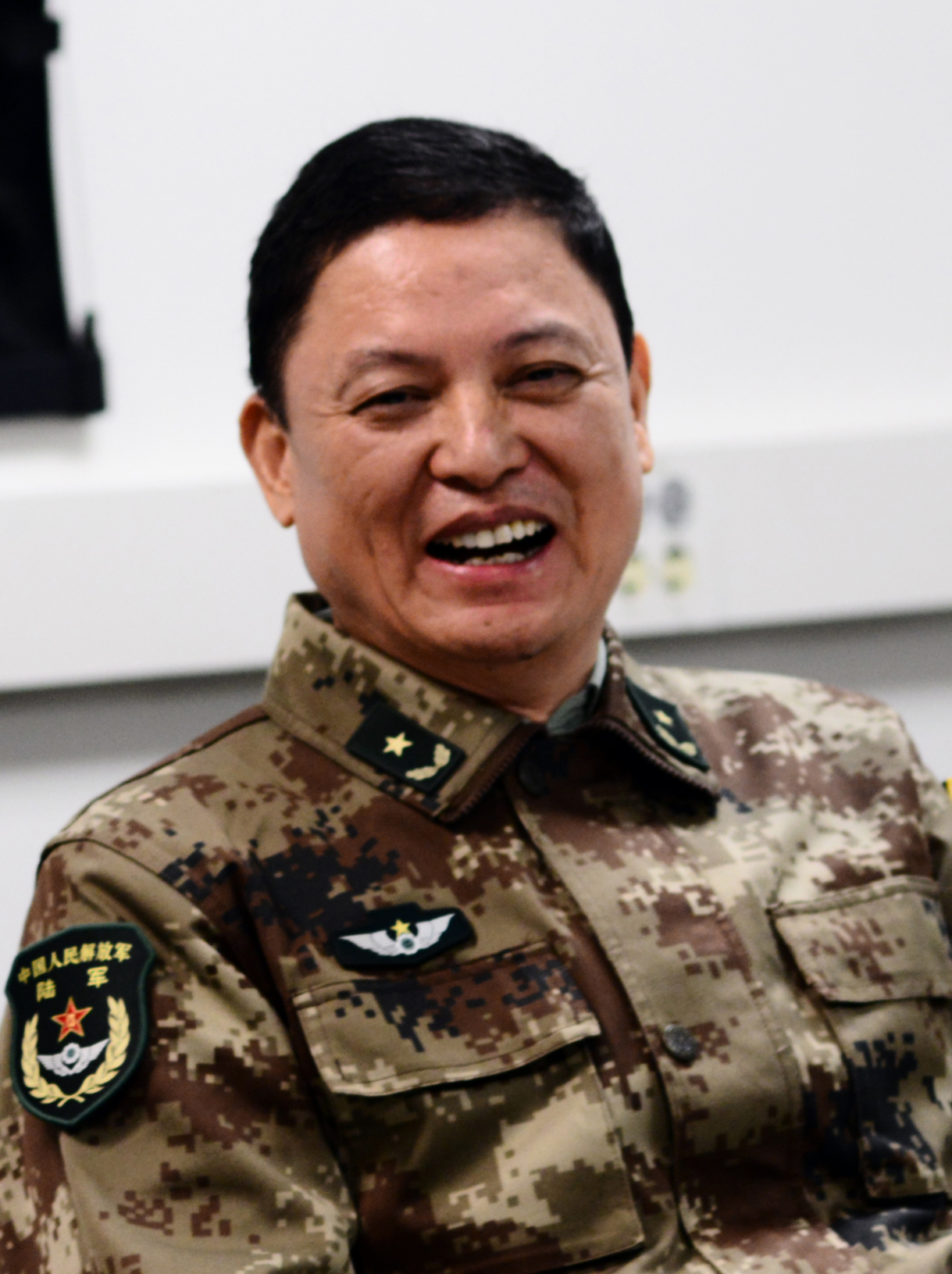
- Zhang in 2017

Chief of Staff of the Western Theater Command
- Incumbent
- Assumed office 2023
- Preceded by: Li Zhonglin

Personal details
- Born: 1963 (age 62–63) Yiyang, Hunan, China
- Party: Chinese Communist Party

Military service
- Allegiance: People's Republic of China
- Branch/service: People's Liberation Army Ground Force
- Years of service: ?–present
- Rank: Lieutenant general
- Unit: 42nd Group Army
- Commands: Western Theater Command

Chinese name
- Simplified Chinese: 张践
- Traditional Chinese: 張踐
Transcriptions
Standard Mandarin
- Hanyu Pinyin: Zhāng Jiàn

Zhang Jian (Chinese: 张践; born 1963) is a lieutenant general in the People's Liberation Army (PLA) of China.

== Biography ==
Zhang was born in Yiyang, Hunan, in 1963. He secondary studied at Yiyang No. 1 High School.

Zhang served in the Guangzhou Military Region for a long time in his early years. In 1997, he served as head of the office of the PLA Hong Kong Garrison. Afterwards, he successively served as commander of the Infantry Brigade of the Hong Kong Garrison, deputy chief of staff of the Hong Kong Garrison, and director of the Operations Department of the Guangzhou Military Region.

In 2007, Zhang became chief of staff of the 42nd Group Army, and later rose to deputy commander.

In May 2013, Zhang was chosen as commander of the Hubei Military District, but having held the position for only more than a year.

In September 2014, Zhang was transferred to south China's Hainan province and appointed commander of the Hainan Military District.

In February 2016, Zhang became chief of staff of the newly founded Eastern Theater Command Ground Force.

In March 2017, Zhang was appointed as director of the Operations Bureau of the Joint Staff Department of the Central Military Commission.

In August 2017, Zhang was commissioned as commander of the Southern Theater Command Ground Force.

In 2023, Zhang rose to become deputy commander of the Western Theater Command, in addition to serving as chief of staff.

He was promoted to the rank of major general (shaojiang) in July 2010 and lieutenant general (zhongjiang) in June 2019.

Military offices
Preceded by Wang Jinyu	Commander of the Hubei Military District; 2013–2014	Succeeded by Chen Shoumin
Preceded by Tan Benhong	Commander of the Hainan Military District; 2014–2016	Succeeded by Chen Shoumin
New title	Chief of Staff of the Eastern Theater Command Ground Force; 2016–2017	Succeeded by Zhou Youya
New title	Director of the Operations Bureau of the Joint Staff Department of the Central Military Commission; 2017	Succeeded by Jia Jiancheng
Preceded by Liu Xiaowu	Commander of the Southern Theater Command Ground Force; 2017–2023	Succeeded by Hu Zhongqiang
Preceded by Li Zhonglin	Chief of Staff of the Western Theater Command; 2023–present	Incumbent
