= Fang Yongxiang =

Chinese general (born 1966)

- 方永祥

Director of the General Office of the Central Military Commission
- In office March 2024 – October 2026
- Preceded by: Zhong Shaojun

Political Commissar of its Southern Theater Command Ground Force
- In office December 2021 – March 2024
- Preceded by: Wang Donghai
- Succeeded by: Yin Hongxing

Personal details
- Born: August 1966 (age 60) Xiamen, Fujian, China
- Party: Chinese Communist Party (expelled in 2026)
- Education: Nanchang Army Academy; PLA National Defence University

Military service
- Allegiance: People's Republic of China
- Branch/service: People's Liberation Army Ground Force
- Years of service: 1985–present
- Rank: Lieutenant general

Fang Yongxiang (Chinese: 方永祥; pinyin: Fāng Yǒngxiáng; born August 1966) is a lieutenant general in the People's Liberation Army of China.

He is an alternate of the 20th Central Committee of the Chinese Communist Party.

== Biography ==
Fang was born in Xiamen, Fujian, in August 1966, and graduated from Nanchang Army Academy and the PLA National Defence University. He enlisted in the People's Liberation Army (PLA) in September 1985, and joined the Chinese Communist Party (CCP) in September 1986.

He served in the 31st Group Army and eventually became political commissar of the 86th Division in 2010. He was director of the Political Department of the 1st Army Group in September 2014 and subsequently a director of a division of the People's Liberation Army General Political Department in June 2015. In 2016, he became deputy director of the Political Work Department of the Eastern Theater Command Ground Force. He served as political commissar of the 81st Group Army from April 2017 until March 2018, when he was succeeded by Wang Zhibin. He was appointed vice minister of Veterans Affairs in March 2018, concurrently serving as assistant director of the Political Work Department of the Central Military Commission. In December 2021, he was commissioned as deputy political commissar of the Southern Theater Command, in addition to serving as political commissar of its Ground Force. In March 2024 Fang succeeded Lieutenant General Zhong Shaojun (Chinese: 钟绍军) as the Director of General Staff of the Central Military Commission and Xi's chief of staff.

On 29 October 2026, the fifth plenary session of the 20th CCP Central Committee reviewed and approved the report of the Discipline Inspection Commission of the Central Military Commission on the "serious violations of discipline and law" by Fang and confirmed the Politburo decision to expel him from the CCP.

Military offices
Preceded by Zhou Xigen	Director of the Political Department of the 1st Army Group; 2014–2016	Succeeded by Wang Zhibin
New title	Political Commissar of the 81st Group Army; 2017–2018	Succeeded by Wang Zhibin
Preceded by Wang Donghai	Political Commissar of its Southern Theater Command Ground Force; 2021–2024	Succeeded by Yin Hongxing
Preceded by Zhong Shaojun	Director of the General Office of the Central Military Commission; 2024-2026	Incumbent
