= 6th Corps (People's Republic of China) =

6th Corps (1949-52)
- Active: 1949.2-1952.6
- Country: (China)
- Garrison/HQ: Dihua, Xinjiang
- Engagements: Chinese Civil War

The 6th Corps(Chinese: 第6军) was a military formation of the Chinese People's Liberation Army existed from 1949 to 1952.

== Chinese Civil War ==
The 6th Corps was activated on February 1, 1949, from 6th Column, Northwest Field Army. Its history could be traced to 3rd Column of Jinsui Military Region formed on November 9, 1947.

The corps took part in the Chinese Civil War under the command of Northwest Field Army, including the Yichuan Campaign and Lanzhou Campaign.

The corps was initially composed of the 16th and 17th Divisions. In May 1949 18th Division was activated.

In September 1949, Independent Division, 6th Corps was activated from absorbed Republic of China Army captives and defectors. Soon after the division was disbanded and being absorbed into 16th and 17th Divisions.

From October 1949, the 18th Division was stationed in Xi'an. In December 1950, the division was renamed to the 4th Public Security Division and detached from the corps.

== Moving into Xinjiang ==
In October 1949, the corps, except its 18th Division moved into Xinjiang.

From November 1949 to January 1950, Headquarters, 6th Corps and 17th Division (except artillery) were deployed into Dihua by rented Aeroflot air transports.

== Disbandment ==
On November 6, 1951, Headquarters, 6th Corps was converted to Air Force Command, Northwestern Military Region. In June 1952 the corps was formally disbanded.

- 16th Division was demobilized as 5th Xinjiang Agriculture Construction Division;
- 17th Division was demobilized as 6th Xinjiang Agriculture Construction Division.
