= Gao Daguang =

Chinese naval admiral

- 高大光

Political Commissar of the People's Liberation Army Joint Logistics Support Force
- In office September 2024 – October 2025
- Preceded by: Wang Wenquan

Personal details
- Born: China
- Party: Chinese Communist Party
- Education: PLA National Defence University

Military service
- Allegiance: People's Republic of China
- Branch/service: People's Liberation Army Navy
- Years of service: ?–2025
- Rank: Vice admiral

Gao Daguang (Chinese: 高大光; pinyin: Gāo Dàguāng) was a vice admiral (zhongjiang) in the People's Liberation Army Navy (PLAN). He served as a representative of the 20th National Congress of the Chinese Communist Party and a delegate to the 14th National People's Congress.

== Career ==
Gao graduated from the PLA National Defence University

Gao began his service in the Shenyang Military Region and previously served as political commissar of a Red Army division under the 39th Group Army of the People's Liberation Army (PLA). In 2013, as part of the organizational reform transitioning divisions to brigades, he was reassigned as political commissar of a brigade. In September 2016, he was appointed deputy political commissar of the 41st Group Army. On 31 July 2017, he was promoted to the rank of major general (shaojiang). In October 2017, as part of the deepening reforms in national defense and military modernization, he assumed the role of deputy political commissar of the newly established 77th Group Army. He later served as director of the Veteran Affairs Bureau under the Political Work Department of the Central Military Commission. By July 2021, he was appointed political commissar of the Central Military Commission Office Administration and Management Bureau. By September 2024, he had taken up the position of political commissar of the People's Liberation Army Joint Logistics Support Force.

== Downfall ==
On 21 July 2025, Gao's qualification for delegates to the 14th National People's Congress was terminated due to "suspected serious discipline violations".

Military offices
Preceded by Wang Wenquan	Political Commissar of the People's Liberation Army Joint Logistics Support Force; 2024–2025	Succeeded by TBA
