= 93rd Armed Police Division =

93rd Division (1949–53) 93rd Infantry Division (1953–60) 93rd Army Division (1960-85) 93rd Infantry Division (1985-96) 93rd Armed Police Division (1998-2017)
- Active: 1949.2 - 2017
- Country: People's Republic of China
- Branch: People's Armed Police
- Role: Gendarmerie; Rapid Reaction Force
- Size: Division
- Garrison/HQ: Putian, Fujian
- Engagements: Chinese Civil War; Relief efforts after 1998 China floods

The 93rd Division (Chinese: 第93师) was created in February 1949 under the Regulation of the Redesignations of All Organizations and Units of the Army, issued by Central Military Commission on November 1, 1948,. basing on the 39th Division, 13th Column of the Huadong Field Army. Its history can be traced to the New 7th Division, Jiaodong Military District, formed in August 1947.

The division was part of the 31st Corps. Under the flag of the 93rd Division, it was engaged in several major battles in the Chinese Civil War, including the Huaihai Campaign and Shanghai Campaign.

In July 1950, Artillery Regiment, 93rd Division was activated, which was later renamed as 373rd Artillery Regiment in 1953.

In April 1960 the division was renamed as 93rd Army Division (Chinese: 陆军第93师). It was then composed of:

- 277th Regiment
- 278th Regiment
- 279th Regiment
- 373rd Artillery Regiment

In June 1969, the 373rd Artillery Regiment was renamed the Artillery Regiment, 93rd Army Division.

In 1985, the division was renamed as 93rd Infantry Division(Chinese: 步兵第93师) and reconstituted as a southern training division:

- 279th Regiment was disbanded;
- 253rd Regiment was attached from the disbanding 85th Army Division.

The division was then composed of:

- 277th Infantry Regiment - training unit
- 278th Infantry Regiment - training unit
- 253rd Infantry Regiment
- Artillery Regiment - training unit

In 1989 the division was reconstituted as a southern infantry division, category B.

In 1996 the division was transferred to the People's Armed Police and reconstituted as the 93rd Armed Police Division(Chinese: 武警第93师). Artillery Regiment, 93rd Infantry Division was reconstituted as the 710th Regiment.

Since then the division was composed of:

- Divisional Headquarters - PAP Unit 8710 - Putian, Fujian
- 277th Armed Police Regiment - PAP Unit 8712 - Putian, Fujian
- 278th Armed Police Regiment - PAP Unit 8713 - Putian, Fujian
- 253rd Armed Police Regiment - PAP Unit 8711 - Putian, Fujian
- 710th Armed Police Regiment - PAP Unit 8714 - Hui'an, Fujian

In August 1998 the 93rd Division was deployed to assist disaster relief during the 1998 China floods.

In 2017 the division was disbanded and absorbed into the 5th Detachment of the 2nd Armed Police Mobile Contingency.
