= 3rd Motorized Infantry Brigade (People's Republic of China) =

Chinese military unit

7th Division (1949–55) 7th Infantry Division (1955–60) 7th Army Division (1960–69) 3rd Army Division (1969–85) 3rd Infantry Division (1985–98) 3rd Motorized Infantry Brigade (1998–2017) 3rd Light Combined Arms Brigade (2017–)
- Active: 1949.2 - present
- Country: People's Republic of China
- Allegiance: Chinese Communist Party
- Branch: People's Liberation Army Ground Force; People's Volunteer Army
- Type: Combined Arms, Air Assault
- Part of: 73rd Group Army
- Garrison/HQ: Jinhua, Zhejiang (before 2017)
- Engagements: Chinese Civil War; Korean War

The 7th Division (Chinese: 第7师)(1st Formation) of the Chinese People's Liberation Army was created in February 1949 under the Regulation of the Redesignations of All Organizations and Units of the Army, issued by Central Military Commission on November 1, 1948, basing on the 2nd Independent Brigade, 3rd Column of the PLA Northwestern Field Army. Its history can be traced to the 358th Brigade(2nd Formation), 120th Division of Eighth Route Army, formed in April 1939.

The division is part of 3rd Corps. Under the flag of 7th division it took part in the Chinese Civil War. In June 1952 it absorbed the 9th Division from the same Corps and was attached to 1st Corps following the merge of 1st and 3rd Corps.

By then the division was composed of:

- 19th Regiment;
- 20th Regiment;
- 21st Regiment(former 27th Regiment, 9th Division);
- 212th Tank Self-Propelled Artillery Regiment (former 25th Regiment, 9th Division);
- 303rd Artillery Regiment (former 26th Regiment, 9th Division);

In February 1953 the division entered Korea to took part in Korean War under the command of the Corps. Since then it became a part of the People's Volunteer Army until 1958.

In 1955 it renamed as the 7th Infantry Division (Chinese: 步兵第7师) of the National Defense Force.

In 1958 it moved to Kaifeng, Henan province with the Corps HQ.

In 1960 it renamed as the 7th Army Division (Chinese: 陆军第7师).

In 1968 the 212th Tank Self-Propelled Artillery Regiment was detached from the division and formed the later 43rd Tank Regiment of the 11th Tank Division.

In December 1969 the division was renamed as the 3rd Army Division(Chinese: 陆军第3师), while the former 3rd Army Division renamed as 7th Army Division. Its 303rd Artillery Regiment became Artillery Regiment, 3rd Army Division.

By then the division was composed of:

- 7th Regiment(former 19th Regiment);
- 8th Regiment(former 20th Regiment);
- 9th Regiment(former 21st Regiment);
- Artillery Regiment.

In 1975 the division moved to Zhejiang Province with the Corps HQ to replace 20th Army Corps. Since then the division is stationed in Jinhua, Zhejiang Province.

In 1985 the division was remained a pack-horse infantry division, renaming as 3rd Infantry Division the (Chinese: 步兵第3师). The division was then maintained as a Northern Infantry Division, Category B unit.

In 1998 the division was reduced and renamed as the 3rd Motorized Infantry Brigade(Chinese: 摩托化步兵第3旅). Its 9th Regiment was reorganized as the 2nd Infantry Regiment, Reserve Infantry Division of Zhejiang.

In 2016 it's reported that the brigade has been converted to an air cavalry rapid response unit.

In 2017 the brigade was reorganized as a combined arms unit and renamed as the 3rd Light Combined Arms Brigade (Chinese: 轻型合成第3旅). It was transferred the 73rd Group Army (formerly the 31st Group Army) under the Eastern Theater Command.
