= Battle of Cao Bằng (1979) =

1979 battle of the Sino-Vietnamese War

- Part of the Sino-Vietnamese War
- A Vietnamese soldier standing on the wreckage of a Chinese Type 59 tank in the Battle of Cao Bằng
Date	17 February – 5 March 1979
Location	Cao Bằng Province, Vietnam
Result	Chinese victory

Belligerents
China	Vietnam

Commanders and leaders
Xu Shiyou; Wu Zhong	Đàm Văn Ngụy; Hoàng Cao Ngôn; Hoàng Biền Sơn

Units involved
41st Army; 121st Division; 122nd Division; 123rd Division; 42nd Army; 124th Division; 125th Division; 126th Division; 43rd Army; 129th Division	346th Division; 246th Infantry; 677th Infantry; 851st Infantry; 188th Artillery; Independent Regiments; 31st (or 852nd); 567th Regiment; 576th (or 183rd); eq. one Armed Police Regiment; five County Battalions

Strength
At least 7 regular divisions ~84,000–200,000: Fire support: 1st Artillery Division; 70th Anti-Aircraft Division	1 regular division plus regional troops, and militia Total ~15,000 (Reinforced by 311th Division since 1 March)

Casualties and losses
Vietnamese claims: 18,000 casualties 134 tanks/APCs destroyed	Chinese claims: 246th & 567th Regiments destroyed
- 1,500 civilians killed 450 civilians captured

The Battle of Cao Bằng was fought between the Chinese People's Liberation Army (PLA) and the Vietnam People's Army (VPA) over the city of Cao Bằng and its vicinity, from the beginning of the Sino-Vietnamese War on 17 February, to 6 March 1979. Chinese forces ended up capturing Cao Bằng along with other territories in northern Vietnam. Despite the Chinese intention to battle against and defeat some major regular units of the VPA, the PLA found themselves encountering mostly small units of Vietnamese border guards and militia. After the capture of Cao Bằng, Chinese forces moved on to capture Đức Long, a town on Highway 4 on 3 March. On 5 March, following the capture of the Vietnamese capital of Lạng Sơn, as well as what analyst described as "other military successes along the 500 mile front", the Chinese forces then declared that they had “attained the goals set for them” in the 17-day border war and that they were withdrawing troops from Vietnam. Analysts located in Vietnam, had observed that some Chinese units in locations that weren't "hotly contested by the Vietnamese" have already commenced withdrawing in the past few days.

The Washington Post on March 6, 1979 reported that though heavy Vietnamese resistance at Cao Bang had resulted in Vietnamese defeats, some Bangkok analysts pointed that Vietnam was at least successful in keeping their losses low by avoiding battles between its main-force units stationed near Hanoi with the Chinese forces. Western analysts had stated that a Vietnamese decision to attack the Chinese troops as they withdrew, could lead to retaliation and cause the war to continue.

== Order of battle ==
According to Edward C. O'Dowd, the Chinese invasion in Cao Bằng Province was conducted by elements of five armies, spearheaded by the PLA 41st and 42nd Armies from the Guangzhou Military Region and supported by the 50th Army from the Chengdu Military Region, and the 12th and 20th Armies from the Nanjing Military Region. The number of troops probably totaled over 200,000 men, assembling in springboards around Jingxi and Longzhou Counties, Guangxi Province. However, Xiaoming Zhang has given much lower figures of Chinese strength in this front, claiming that the 129th Division of the 43rd Army was the only additional unit besides the leading 41st and 42nd Armies. In contrast, O'Dowd includes this division in the Chinese order of battle in Lạng Sơn. Fire support for the Chinese Eastern Wing was provided by the 1st Artillery and the 70th Anti-Aircraft Divisions.

Facing them were elements of the VPA 346th Division, which had been converted from an economic construction unit into a combat unit since April 1978, consisting of three infantry and one artillery regiments. Its 246th Regiment was stationed at Sóc Giang northwest of Cao Bằng, while the sister 677th Regiment was tasked with defending the Trà Lĩnh area. The remaining infantry regiment, the 851st, had its initial role of a reserve unit. Fire support was provided by the 188th Artillery Regiment, which took its positions along the area between Lũng Lợi and Phù Ngọc. The division was assisted by three independent regiments: the 31st positioned at Phục Hòa, the 567th at Trùng Khánh, the 576th at Trà Lĩnh. Complementing these were 3,000-troop local forces: 2,000 in five independent battalions of the border counties and one special operations battalion, and 1,000 at about a dozen border stations of the Armed Police. The combined total was ~15,000 troops. The defense at the township of Cao Bằng itself was undertaken by the VPA 481st Regiment.

Different from Zhang, Vietnamese sources recorded three independent regiments in Cao Bằng front were: the 567th and 852nd of Cao Bằng province, and the 183rd of Hải Hưng province. There is no appearance of the 31st, 576th or 481st Regiments.

== Battle ==
Chinese forces launched their offensive in Cao Bằng at dawn of 17 February. The PLA 41st Army was charged with striking Cao Bằng from the north after seizing Trà Lĩnh, while the 42nd Army was assigned to attack the city from the southeast after taking Quảng Uyên. Another force from the 42nd (otherwise the 129th Division) would be sent through Highway 4 to join with friendly units north of Lạng Sơn, thus enabling the transfer of troops between the two fronts, as well as blocking enemy reinforcements from Thái Nguyên.

On 18 February, the Vietnamese Ministry of Defense reinforced Cao Bằng with its 45th Special Operation Battalion, a B72 anti-tank missile battalion, an artillery battalion from the 675th Artillery Brigade, and the 38th Sapper Regiment from the 473rd Division.

The PLA 41st Army's advance was gravely hampered, as it immediately ran into contact with the VPA 677th Regiment on the way. It took the Chinese five days to capture Trà Lĩnh on 22 February, to intrude no more than 10–15 km in another direction against Trùng Khánh. Other elements of the 41st were also bogged down in engagements with Vietnamese forces near Thông Nông. The heaviest fighting was witnessed at Sóc Giang, as the PLA 122nd Division took five days to end Vietnamese resistance there, instead of the two days in original calculation. On 20 February, two Chinese companies and their support elements were pinned down by Vietnamese forces in two separate clashes, resulting in a total of 296 Chinese casualties and six tanks damaged.

Although Wu Zhong – its commander, was removed from command for investigation by 20 February, the situation was more endurable for the 42nd Army. As by 22 February they had taken Phục Hòa, Thất Khê, Quảng Uyên, and Đông Khê, penetrating some 25 km into Vietnamese territory from Shuikouguan. However, it had failed to meet the 24-hour schedule to obtain the objectives around Cao Bằng, due to difficult terrain and frequent Vietnamese ambushes. The PLA 121st Division had to march for six days to arrive their destination at Khau Đồn, southwest of Cao Bằng. Previously, on 20 February, a Chinese tank unit from the 42nd Army leading the advance into Bắc Sơn had been intercepted and lost a number of tanks to Vietnamese anti-tank missiles; the force had only survived after receiving reinforcements from its parental unit.

According to report from the Vietnamese side, they had severely mauled four Chinese battalions and destroyed scores of enemy tanks and vehicles after the first three days of fighting in the province.

On 23 February, the PLA command realized that Cao Bằng was actually held by only a small number of Vietnamese troops. Instead of waiting for the 41st Army to break through enemy defense from the north, General Xu Shiyou, the overall commander of the Chinese campaign in Vietnam, ordered an immediate assault on the city. Cao Bằng fell on 25 February, yet fighting still went on intensely in other areas throughout the province. On 26 February, the VPA Cao Bằng Front Command was established, headed by Colonel Đàm Văn Ngụy. Among his six deputies were: Colonel Hoàng Cao Ngôn – commander of Cao Bằng provincial command, and Colonel Hoàng Biền Sơn – commander of the 346th Division. The new 311th Division was founded three days later to fight alongside the exhausted 346th, comprising the 169th, 529th, and 531st Infantry Regiments plus the 456th Artillery Regiment.

On 27 February, Chinese forces captured the Guen Tiat airfield, southwest of Thất Khê, which continued to be contested by both sides afterwards. On the same day, Vietnamese forces staged counter-attacks against the occupied towns of Quảng Uyên and Trà Lĩnh, where Chinese control had not been restored until 2 and 3 March respectively. At 19:30 on 3 March, Chinese forces took Đức Long, a town on Highway 4, thus successfully connecting the Chinese areas of operations in Cao Bằng and Lạng Sơn. On 5 March, the Chinese government announced they had achieved their goals in their 17 day border war and consequently the withdrawal of troops from Vietnam. There was no immediate response from Hanoi to China's announcement.

At the end of these operations, the Chinese declared to have destroyed the Vietnamese 567th Regiment at Phục Hòa, but the Vietnamese claimed their 567th Regiment successfully halted the Chinese advance at the Khau Chỉa Pass in 12 days before withdrawing.

== Aftermath ==
Although the Chinese had eventually captured Cao Bằng from the Vietnamese 346th Division, the capture of the city had seriously spoiled their original plan. By 26 February, China claimed to have annihilated the VPA 677th, 681st (probably the 481st), and 246th Regiments. For the duration of the battle, PLA units had been tied down for nearly ten days by a single Vietnamese division. Chinese forces also failed to seek and engage the bulk of Vietnamese regular units. For instance, it took the PLA a whole day searching for VPA regulars in the Ke Map Nua area, 3 km north of Cao Bằng, without any results. With the exception of Sóc Giang, most of the clashes were fought against Vietnamese militia and citizen-soldiers, who had inflicted heavy losses on Chinese troops and held off their invasion. Nevertheless, Vietnam's ultimate loss of Cao Bằng and Lạng Sơn exposed the local economy to ruin. Retreating Chinese forces adopted a scorched earth policy, destroying infrastructure, industrial facilities, and population centers. Restoration of these economic centers was slow as Chinese psychological warfare kept Vietnam on a war footing while China committed to the reform and opening up.

The Chinese army waged an energetic counterinsurgency campaign to cover its retreat. In its course, the Chinese were accused of various war crimes by Vietnamese authorities, such as the Tong Chup massacre at the village of Tổng Chúp, Hòa An District on 9 March, in which troopers of the PLA 42nd Army had reportedly executed 43 civilians by axes. Allegations remain largely unverifiable and unbenknowest to the international community as no Western correspondents were able to access the Sino-Vietnamese border region when fighting was occurring. However, the Vietnamese recorded the incident with photographs and interviews. The Xinhua News Agency denied any Chinese involvement in such atrocities.
