= Hu Zhongqiang =

Chinese general

- 胡中强

Commander of the Southern Theater Command Ground Force
- Incumbent
- Assumed office May 2023
- Preceded by: Zhang Jian

Deputy Commander of the People's Armed Police
- In office December 2021 – May 2023
- Commander: Wang Chunning
- Preceded by: Qin Tian
- Succeeded by: Cao Junzhang

Personal details
- Born: January 1967 (age 59) Liupanshui, Guizhou, China
- Party: Chinese Communist Party
- Education: Liupanshui Normal University

Military service
- Allegiance: People's Republic of China
- Branch/service: People's Liberation Army Ground Force (?-2021) (2023-present); People's Armed Police (2021–2023)
- Years of service: ?-present
- Rank: Lieutenant General
- Unit: Chengdu Military Region 13th Group Army 14th Group Army 73rd Group Army People's Armed Police Southern Theater Command Ground Force Southern Theater Command

Chinese name
- Simplified Chinese: 胡中强
- Traditional Chinese: 胡中强
Transcriptions
Standard Mandarin
- Hanyu Pinyin: Hú Zhōngqiáng

Hu Zhongqiang (Chinese: 胡中强, born January 1967) is a lieutenant general of the People's Liberation Army and is currently serving as the Commander of the Southern Theater Command Ground Force, and deputy commander of the Southern Theater Command.

== Biography ==
Hu Zhongming was born in Liupanshui, Guizhou, in January 1967, he graduated from the Liupanshui Normal University in biology. There he studied from 1982 to 1985 at the Liupanshui Normal University.

He has served as the Commander of the 445th Regiment, part of the Chengdu Military Region, Commander of the 110th Regiment, part of the 37th Division of the Chengdu Military Region. He then served as the Chief of Staff of the 13th Group Army. In June 2016 he was reassigned, becoming the commander of the 14th Group Army. In 2017 after the military reorganization he was to become commander of the 73rd Group Army.

In December 2021 he was to become the deputy commander of the People's Armed Police. In 2023 it was announced that he became deputy commander of the southern theater command and the commander of its ground force.

In 2012 he took part in the "Beyond 2012-A" exercise in Nanjing. In 2023 he took part in an joint exercise "Friendship Shield-2023" between Laos and China.

Military offices
Preceded by Qin Tian	Deputy Commander of the People's Armed Police; 2021-2023	Succeeded by Cao Junzhang
Preceded by Zhang Jian	Commaner of the Southern Theater Command Ground Force; 2023	Incumbent
