= Wei Liang =

- 魏亮

Political Commissar of the Southern Theater Command
- In office February 2016 – April 2018
- Preceded by: New title
- Succeeded by: Wang Jianwu

Political Commissar of the Guangzhou Military Region
- In office October 2012 – January 2016
- Preceded by: Zhang Yang
- Succeeded by: Position revoked

Personal details
- Born: February 1953 (age 73) Gaochun County, Jiangsu, China
- Party: Chinese Communist Party

Military service
- Allegiance: People's Republic of China
- Branch/service: People's Liberation Army Ground Force
- Rank: General

Wei Liang (Chinese: 魏亮; pinyin: Wèi Liàng; born February 1953) is a retired general (shangjiang) in the Chinese People's Liberation Army. He served as Political Commissar of the Southern Theater Command.

== Biography ==
Originally from Gaochun County (now Gaochun District), Jiangsu, Wei served in the 26th Army, then the People's Armed Police, before joining the Guangzhou Military Region in a leadership position. He earned the rank of General in July 2014. Between 2012 and 2016, he was the Political Commissar of the Guangzhou Military Region. He was a member of the 18th Central Committee of the Chinese Communist Party.

Military offices
| Preceded by Gao Wusheng | Director of the Political Department of the 12th Group Army; 2000–2002 | Succeeded by Zhu Fuxi |
| Preceded by Dai Changjiu | Deputy Political Commissar of the 12th Group Army; 2004 | Succeeded by Tao Zhengming |
| Preceded by Chen Lijiu | Political Commissar of the Jiangxi Military District; 2004 | Succeeded by Li Guangjin |
| Preceded by Wang Jinxiang | Political Commissar of the 26th Group Army; 2004–2009 | Succeeded by Li Jingwen |
| Preceded by Zhang Yang | Political Commissar of the Guangzhou Military Region; 2012–2016 | Succeeded by Position revoked |
| New title | Political Commissar of the Southern Theater Command; 2016–2018 | Succeeded by Wang Jianwu |
