= 9th Division (People's Republic of China) =

Former Chinese military unit

9th Division (1949–52)
- Active: February 1949.2 – June 1952
- Country: People's Republic of China
- Allegiance: Chinese Communist Party
- Branch: People's Liberation Army Ground Force
- Type: Division
- Role: Infantry
- Part of: 3rd Corps
- Engagements: Chinese Civil War

The 9th Division (Chinese: 第9师) of the People's Liberation Army was created in February 1949 under the Regulation of the Redesignations of All Organizations and Units of the Army, issued by Central Military Commission on November 1, 1948, basing on the 5th Independent Brigade, 3rd Column of the PLA Northwestern Field Army. Its history can be traced to the 5th Independent Brigade, 3rd Column of Jinsui Military District, formed in November 1946.

The division became part of 3rd Corps. As the 9th Division it took part in the Chinese Civil War. In June 1952 it was disbanded and absorbed into the 7th Division from the same Corps. The divisional headquarters was converted into Headquarters, 15th Artillery Division.

At disbandment division was composed of:

- 25th Regiment(disbanded and distributed to the Air Force, 212th Tank Self-Propelled Artillery Regiment, 19th and 20th Regiments of 7th Division);
- 26th Regiment(later renamed as Artillery Regiment, 7th Division);
- 27th Regiment(later renamed as 21st Regiment, 7th Division).
