= Hubei Military District =

- 中国人民解放军湖北省军区
- Founded: June 2, 1949; 76 years ago
- Country: People's Republic of China
- Allegiance: Chinese Communist Party
- Type: Military district
- Role: Command and control
- Part of: People's Liberation Army
- Headquarters: Wuhan, Hubei

Commanders
- Commander: Major general (shaojiang) Li Bin
- Political Commisar: Major general (shaojiang) Jiang Yong

Chinese name
- Simplified Chinese: 中国人民解放军湖北省军区
- Traditional Chinese: 中國人民解放軍雲南省軍區
Transcriptions
Standard Mandarin
- Hanyu Pinyin: Zhōngguó Rénmín Jiěfàngjūn Húběishěng Jūnqū

The Hubei Military District (Chinese: 中国人民解放军湖北省军区; full name People's Liberation Army Hubei Military District or PLA Hubei Military District) is a military district of the National Defense Mobilization Department of the Central Military Commission in China.

== History ==
Hubei Military District was established on 2 June 1949.

== Leaders ==
=== Commanders ===
Name (English)	Name (Chinese)	Tenure begins	Tenure ends	Note
Li Xiannian	李先念	May 1949	April 1950	
Wang Shusheng	王树声	May 1950	April 1955	
Chen Zaidao	陈再道	May 1955	August 1956	
Han Dongshan	韩东山	August 1956	May 1964	
Wu Shi'an	吴世安	May 1964	July 1968	
Zhao Fuxing	赵复兴	July 1968	December 1969	
Xin Junjie	信俊杰	December 1969	September 1975	
Zhang Xiulong	张秀龙	October 1975	February 1981	
Zhu Chuanyu	诸传禹	February 1981	May 1983	
Wang Hengyi	王恒一	May 1983	August 1985	
Wang Shen	王申	August 1985	April 1992	
Liu Guoyu	刘国裕	April 1992	February 1995	
Jia Fukun	贾富坤	February 1995	July 2003	
Yuan Shijun	苑世军	July 2003	April 2010	
Wang Jinyu	汪金玉	April 2010	May 2013	
Zhang Jian	张践	May 2013	September 2014	
Chen Shoumin	陈守民	September 2014	May 2016	
Ma Tao	马涛	August 2017	July 2021	
Zhou Yuexing	周月星	July 2021	January 2024	
Li Bin	郦斌	January 2024		

=== Political commissars ===
Name (English)	Name (Chinese)	Tenure begins	Tenure ends	Note
Li Xiannian	李先念	May 1949	April 1955	
Wang Renzhong	王任重	May 1955	July 1956	
Zhang Tixue	张体学	July 1956	August 1973	First Political Commissar
Zhao Xinchu	赵辛初	May 1975	August 1978	First Political Commissar
Chen Pixian	陈丕显	August 1978	August 1982	First Political Commissar
Guan Guangfu	关广富	January 1983	July 1985	First Political Commissar
Zhang Xueqi	张学奇	August 1985	June 1990	
Wang Jieqing	王洁清	June 1990	May 1994	
Xu Shiqiao	徐师樵	May 1994	July 1998	
Wu Fenglong	吴凤龙	July 1998	December 2001	
Liu Xunfa	刘勋发	January 2002	August 2007	
Shi Baohua	石宝华	August 2007	September 2011	
Wu Shezhou	吴社洲	September 2011	March 2012	
Chen Damin	陈大民	March 2012	July 2014	
Feng Xiaolin	冯晓林	July 2014	December 2018	
Xie Donghui	谢东辉	April 2020	January 2023	
Jiang Yong	江勇	January 2023		
