= Ling Huanxin =

- 凌焕新

Political Commissar of the People's Liberation Army Academy of Military Sciences
- Incumbent
- Assumed office June 2023
- President: Yang Xuejun
- Preceded by: Bai Lü

Personal details
- Born: March 1962 (age 64) Jingjiang County, Jiangsu, China
- Party: Chinese Communist Party

Military service
- Allegiance: People's Republic of China
- Branch/service: People's Liberation Army Ground Force
- Rank: General

Chinese name
- Simplified Chinese: 凌焕新
- Traditional Chinese: 凌煥新
Transcriptions
Standard Mandarin
- Hanyu Pinyin: Líng Huànxīn

Ling Huanxin (Chinese: 凌焕新; born March 1962) is a general in the People's Liberation Army of China, currently serving as political commissar of the People's Liberation Army Academy of Military Sciences, in office since June 2023.

He is a representative of the 20th National Congress of the Chinese Communist Party and an alternate of the 20th Central Committee of the Chinese Communist Party. He is a delegate to the 13th National People's Congress.

== Biography ==
Ling was born in Jingjiang County (now Jingjiang), Jiangsu, in March 1962. He was deputy head of the Organization Division of the People's Liberation Army General Political Department before being appointed Director of the Political Department of the Northern Theater Command Ground Force in January 2017. In March 2017, he became a member of the Commission for Discipline Inspection of the Central Military Commission, and was elevated to deputy secretary in December 2018. In June 2023, he was elevated to political commissar of the People's Liberation Army Academy of Military Sciences.

He attained the rank of lieutenant general (zhongjiang) in December 2019 and general (shangjiang) in June 2023.

Military offices
Preceded by Bai Lü	Political Commissar of the PLA Academy of Military Science; 2023–present	Incumbent
