= Yin Fanglong =

- 殷方龙

Political Commissar of the Central Theater Command
- In office February 2016 – December 2018
- Preceded by: New position
- Succeeded by: Zhu Shengling

Personal details
- Born: November 1953 (age 72) Yangzhong, Jiangsu, China
- Party: Chinese Communist Party

Military service
- Allegiance: People's Republic of China
- Branch/service: People's Liberation Army Ground Force
- Years of service: 1972–2018
- Rank: General

Chinese name
- Simplified Chinese: 殷方龙
- Traditional Chinese: 殷方龍
Transcriptions
Standard Mandarin
- Hanyu Pinyin: Yīn Fānglóng

Yin Fanglong (Chinese: 殷方龙; born November 1953) is a retired general of the Chinese People's Liberation Army (PLA). He served as the inaugural Political Commissar of the Central Theater Command from 2016 to 2018. Prior to that, he served as deputy director of the PLA General Political Department from 2012 to 2016.

== Biography ==
Yin Fanglong was born in November 1953 in Yangzhong, Jiangsu Province. He joined the PLA in 1972. He served in the Lanzhou Military Region and the Shenyang Military Region, where he was the political commissar of a tank division.

In 1999 he became deputy director of the Political Department of the PLA General Armaments Department, and was promoted to Director in 2004. In 2008 he was appointed Director of the Political Department of the Second Artillery Corps, and in 2012 he became deputy director of the PLA General Political Department.

Yin Fanglong attained the rank of major general in 2001 and lieutenant general in 2010. On 31 July 2015, he was promoted to general (shangjiang), the highest rank for Chinese military officers in active service, along with nine other officers. In February 2016, he was named Political Commissar of the newly established Central Theater Command. In March 2018, he was appointed deputy director of the National People's Congress Education, Science, Culture and Public Health Committee.

Yin was an alternate of the 18th Central Committee of the Chinese Communist Party (2012–2017).

Military offices
Preceded by Zhang Xiaozhong	Director of the Political Department of the Second Artillery Corps; 2008–2012	Succeeded by Yu Daqing
New title	Political Commissar of the Central Theater Command; 2016–2018	Succeeded by Zhu Shengling
