= Southern Theater Command Ground Force =

- 中国人民解放军南部战区陆军
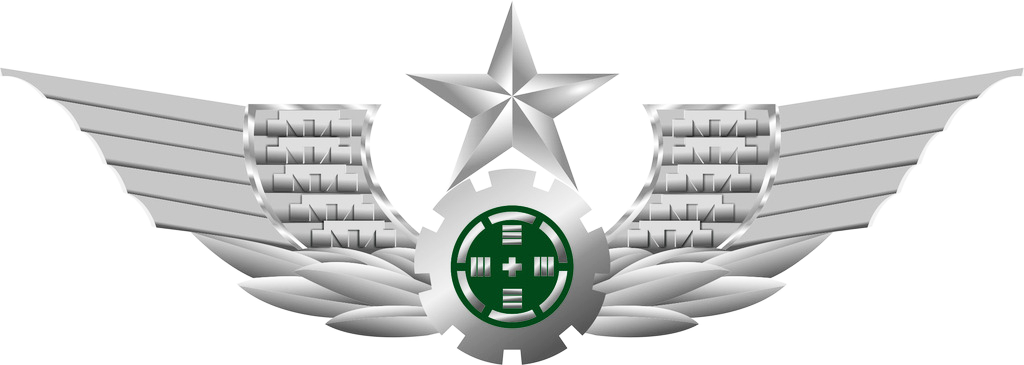
- Emblem of the People's Liberation Army Ground Force
- Active: 2016–present
- Country: China
- Allegiance: Chinese Communist Party
- Branch: People's Liberation Army Ground Force
- Part of: Southern Theater Command
- Garrison/HQ: Nanning, Guangxi
- Mottos: 为人民服务 "Serve the People"
- Colors: Red and Green
- March: Military Anthem of the People's Liberation Army

Commanders
- Commander: Lieutenant General Hu Zhongqiang
- Political Commissar: Lieutenant General Yin Hongxing
- Chief of Staff: Major General Han Peng

Southern Theater Command Ground Force
- Southern Theater Command
- Simplified Chinese: 中国人民解放军南部战区陆军
- Traditional Chinese: 中國人民解放軍南部戰區陸軍
Transcriptions
Standard Mandarin
- Hanyu Pinyin: Zhōngguó Rénmín Jiěfàngjūn Nánbù Zhànqū Lùjūn

Southern Theater Command Ground Force is the Chinese ground force under the Southern Theater Command. Its headquarters is in Nanning, Guangxi. The current commander is Hu Zhongqiang and the current political commissar is Yin Hongxing.

== History ==
The Southern Theater Command Ground Force was officially established on 31 December 2015 with the troops of former Guangzhou Military Region and Nanjing Military Region.

== Functional departments ==
- General Staff
- Political Work Department
- Logistics Department
- Equipment department
- Disciplinary Inspection Committee

== Directly subordinate functional units ==
- PLA Ground Force Luzhai Joint Tactic Training Base
- PLA Ground Force Third Comprehensive Training Base
- PLA Ground Force Fourth Comprehensive Training Base

== Directly subordinate combat units ==
=== Group army ===
- 74th Group Army (stationed in Huizhou, Guangdong)
- 75th Group Army (stationed in Kunming, Yunnan)

=== Directly Subordinate Units ===
- 2nd Reconnaissance Intelligence Brigade (情報偵察第2旅)
- 2nd Information Support Brigade （信息保障第2旅）
- 2nd Electronic Warfare Brigade （電子对抗第2旅）
- 2nd Long Range Rocket Artillery Brigade (远程火箭炮兵第2旅)
- 311th Coastal Defense Brigade (海防第311旅) (stationed in Zhuhai, Guangdong)
- 312th Brigade of Coastal Defense（海防第312旅) (stationed in Danzhou, Hainan)
- 313th Border Defense Brigade (边防第313旅) (stationed in Pingxiang, Guangxi)
- 314th Border Defense Brigade（边防第314旅）(stationed in Honghe Hani and Yi Autonomous Prefecture, Yunan)
- 315th Border Defense Brigade (边防第315旅) (stationed in Xishuangbanna Dai Autonomous Prefecture, Yunnan)
- 316th Border Defense Brigade (边防第316旅) (stationed in Lincang, Yunnan)
- 317th Border Defense Brigade（边防第317旅) (stationed in Dehong Dai and Jingpo Autonomous Prefecture, Yunnan)

== List of leaders ==
=== Commanders ===
English name	Chinese name	Took office	Left office	Notes
Liu Xiaowu	刘小午	2016	2017	
Zhang Jian	张践	September 2017	May 2023	
Hu Zhongqiang	胡中强	May 2023		

=== Political commissars ===
English name	Chinese name	Took office	Left office	Notes
Bai Lü	白吕	2016	2020	
Fang Yongxiang	方永祥	December 2021	March 2024	
Yin Hongxing	尹红星	July 2024		

=== Chiefs of staff ===
English name	Chinese name	Took office	Left office	Notes
Han Peng	韩鹏	2016		
