= Beishakou Township =

Beishakou Township 北沙口乡
- Rural Township
- Běishākǒu Xiāng
- Location in Hebei Location in China
- Coordinates: 39°08′15″N 116°08′10″E
- Country: People's Republic of China
- Province: Hebei
- Prefecture-level city: Baoding
- County: Xiong

Area
  - Total: 35.38 km^{2} (13.66 sq mi)

Population (2010)
  - Total: 21,371
  - Density: 604.1/km^{2} (1,565/sq mi)
- Time zone: UTC+8 (China Standard)

Beishakou Township (Chinese: 北沙口乡; pinyin: Běishākǒu Xiāng) is a rural township located in Xiong County, Baoding, Hebei, China. According to the 2010 census, Beishakou Township had a population of 21,371, including 10,785 males and 10,586 females. The population was distributed as follows: 3,819 people aged under 14, 15,622 people aged between 15 and 64, and 1,930 people aged over 65.

== See also ==
- List of township-level divisions of Hebei
