= Wang Wenquan =

General in the People's Liberation Army of China

- 王文全

Political Commissar of the Southern Theater Command
- Incumbent
- Assumed office December 2023
- Commander: Wang Xiubin
- Preceded by: Wang Jianwu

Political Commissar of the Joint Support Force of the Central Military Commission
- In office September 2020 – December 2023
- Preceded by: Xu Zhongbo
- Succeeded by: Gao Daguang

Personal details
- Born: December 1962 (age 63) Xinzhou County, Hubei, China
- Party: Chinese Communist Party

Military service
- Allegiance: People's Republic of China
- Branch/service: People's Liberation Army Ground Force
- Rank: General

Wang Wenquan (Chinese: 王文全; pinyin: Wáng Wénquán; born December 1962) is a general in the People's Liberation Army of China, who has served as the political commissar of the Southern Theater Command since December 2023.

== Biography ==
Wang was born in Xinzhou County, Hubei, in December 1962.

He served in the 20th Group Army for a long time. He was Director of the Political Department of the 26th Group Army (now 80th Group Army) in July 2013 and subsequently political commissar of the 27th Group Army in March 2016. One year later, he became political commissar of the 72nd Group Army. He was promoted to deputy political commissar of the People's Liberation Army Ground Force in June 2020, and soon in September he was chosen as political commissar of the Joint Support Force of the Central Military Commission. He was named as the political commissar of the Southern Theater Command in December 2023, succeeding Wang Jianwu.

He was promoted to the rank of major general (shaojiang) in July 2014 and lieutenant general (zhongjiang) in June 2020. In December 2023, he was promoted to the rank of general (shangjiang).

He was a delegate to the 13th National People's Congress. He was a representative of the 20th National Congress of the Chinese Communist Party and is a member of the 20th Central Committee of the Chinese Communist Party.

Military offices
Preceded by Xue Ningbing	Political Commissar of the 27th Group Army; 2016–2017	Succeeded by ?
Preceded by Qin Shutong	Political Commissar of the 72nd Group Army; 2017–2020	Succeeded by ?
Preceded by Xu Zhongbo	Political Commissar of the Joint Support Force of the Central Military Commission; 2020–	Incumbent
