= Wang Jianwu =

Chinese general

- 王建武

Political Commissar of the Southern Theater Command
- In office December 2018 – December 2023
- Commander: Yuan Yubai; Wang Xiubin
- Preceded by: Wei Liang
- Succeeded by: Wang Wenquan

Political Commissar of the Tibet Military District
- In office August 2016 – 2018
- Preceded by: Diao Guoxin
- Succeeded by: Zhang Xuejie

Personal details
- Born: August 1958 (age 68) Luoning County, Henan, China
- Party: Chinese Communist Party
- Education

Military service
- Allegiance: People's Republic of China
- Branch/service: People's Liberation Army Ground Force
- Rank: General
- Commands: Southern Theater Command

Wang Jianwu (Chinese: 王建武; pinyin: Wāng Jiànwǔ; Wade–Giles: Wang Chien-wu; born August 1958) is a Chinese military officer who was the political commissar of the Southern Theater Command, one of the five military regions of the People's Liberation Army, from January 2019 to December 2023.

== Biography ==
Wang was born in Luoning County, Henan, in August 1958. He served in various posts in the Jinan Military Region before becoming political commissar of the Tibet Military District in 2016. He was deputy director of the Political Work Department of the Central Military Commission and deputy leader of the Leading Group on Poverty Alleviation and Development of the State Council in May 2018, and held that offices until January 2019. In December 2018, Wang was appointed political commissar of the Southern Theater Command, replacing Wei Liang. He was succeeded by Wang Wenquan in December 2023.

Wang was promoted to the rank of general. He was a member of the 19th Central Committee of the Chinese Communist Party.

Military offices
Preceded by Diao Guoxin	Political commissar of the Tibet Military District; 2016–2018	Succeeded by Zhang Xuejie (张学杰)
Preceded by Wei Liang	Political commissar of the Southern Theater Command; 2019	Incumbent
