= Yu Daqing =

Chinese general

- 于大清
- Born: November 1957 (age 68–69); Suizhong County, Liaoning, China
- Military career
- Allegiance: People's Republic of China
- Branch: People's Liberation Army Ground Force
- Rank: Lieutenant-general
- Commands: Deputy Political Commissar of the Second Artillery Corps

Yu Daqing (Chinese: 于大清; pinyin: Yú Dàqīng; born November 1957) is a lieutenant-general in the People's Liberation Army of China, who served as Deputy Political Commissar of the Second Artillery Corps. He was placed under investigation by the PLA's anti-graft agency in December 2014.

== Life and career ==
Yu was born and raised in Suizhong County, Liaoning. He joined the People's Liberation Army in 1975 and the Chinese Communist Party in 1977. Yu served as Political Commissar of the 123 Division of the 41st Group Army from 2005 to 2006, and Deputy Head of the Cadre Department of the People's Liberation Army General Political Department between 2007 and 2009, he was promoted to the head position in December 2009. He attained the rank of major general in July 2008. He became Director of the Political Department of the Second Artillery Corps in December 2012 and Deputy Political Commissar of the Second Artillery Corps in December 2013. Yu was promoted to lieutenant-general in July 2014. On January 15, 2015, the People's Liberation Army announced that he has been under investigation since December 2014 for "seriously violating party discipline".

Military offices
Previous: Yin Fanglong	Director of the Political Department of the Second Artillery Corps; 2012–2013	Next: Tang Guoqing (唐国庆)
Previous: Zhu Fuxi	Head of the Cadre Department of the People's Liberation Army General Political Department; 2009–2012	Next: Feng Jianhua (冯建华)
