= Zhang Xuejie =

- 张学杰

Political Commissar of the Tibet Military District
- Incumbent
- Assumed office May 2018
- Preceded by: Wang Jianwu

Personal details
- Born: August 1961 (age 64) Shou County, Anhui, China
- Party: Chinese Communist Party

Military service
- Allegiance: People's Republic of China
- Branch/service: People's Liberation Army Ground Force
- Years of service: ?–present
- Rank: Lieutenant general

Chinese name
- Simplified Chinese: 张学杰
- Traditional Chinese: 張學傑
Transcriptions
Standard Mandarin
- Hanyu Pinyin: Zhāng Xuéjié

Zhang Xuejie (Chinese: 张学杰; born August 1961) is a lieutenant general (zhongjiang) of the People's Liberation Army (PLA) serving as political commissar of the Tibet Military District, succeeding Wang Jianwu in May 2018.

== Biography ==
Zhang was born in Shou County, Anhui, in August 1961. He served in the 31st Group Army for a long time. In 2013, he was made political commissar of the 12th Group Army, replacing Bai Lü. In 2017, he given the position of political commissar of the 31st Group Army. In 2017, he became deputy director of Political Work Department of the Eastern Theater Command. In May 2018, he succeeded Wang Jianwu as political commissar of the Tibet Military District. In January 2020, he was admitted as a member of the standing committee of the Tibet Autonomous Regional Committee of the Chinese Communist Party, the region's top authority.

He was promoted to the rank of major general (shaojiang) in July 2010 and lieutenant general (zhongjiang) in June 2019.

== Personal life ==
His elder brother Zhang Xueping (born 1955) is a politician and the current vice chairman of the Anhui Provincial Committee of the Chinese People's Political Consultative Conference.

Military offices
Preceded by Bai Lü	Political Commissar of the 12th Group Army; 2013–2014	Succeeded by Zhou Wanzhu
Preceded by Jiang Yong	Political Commissar of the 31st Group Army; 2014–2017	Succeeded by Position revoked
Preceded by Wang Jianwu	Political Commissar of the Tibet Military District; 2018–present	Incumbent
