= Tong Chup massacre =

1979 mass killing during the Sino-Vietnamese War

- Location: Tong Chup village, Hung Dao commune, Cao Bằng, Vietnam
- Date: March 9, 1979; 47 years ago
- Attack type: Massacre
- Deaths: 43
- Perpetrator: People's Liberation Army of China

The Tong Chup massacre (Vietnamese: Thảm sát Tổng Chúp) was a war crime committed by the People's Liberation Army of China during the Sino-Vietnamese War of 1979. The incident happened in Tong Chup village, Hung Dao commune, Cao Bằng city. From February 17, 1979, the Chinese Liberation Army simultaneously attacked Vietnam along the northern border between the two countries.

Since the Sino-Vietnamese border region was inaccessible to foreign correspondents during the war, Vietnamese claims was never independently verified, and the incident was largely unknown outside Vietnam. Similarly, the death toll of the massacre is unverifiable. Associated Press journalists visiting Tong Chup in 1987 cited Vietnamese officials that the number of deaths was higher than the 504 killed in the Mỹ Lai massacre according to Vietnamese statistics.

== Background ==
After the Paris Peace Accords on Vietnam were signed in 1973, the relationship between the Democratic Republic of Vietnam and the People's Republic of China began to deteriorate. China began to cut aid to the Democratic Republic of Vietnam on the grounds that it made a compromise with the United States. Meanwhile, US-China relations began to soften, facilitated by US President Richard Nixon's visit to China in 1972. This pushed the Hanoi government to have closer relations with the Soviet Union. In 1974, China sent troops to attack and capture the Paracel Islands from the Republic of Vietnam. Immediately after the end of the Vietnam War, in September 1975, during his visit to China, General Secretary Lê Duẩn raised the issue of the Paracel Islands with China, but the Chinese did not offer any concessions.

== Developments ==
On March 9, 1979, four days after the Chinese government announced the withdrawal of troops from Vietnam, the Chinese Liberation Army attacked a pig farm in Tong Chup village, killing 43 people, including women and children, the bodies were buried in a well. According to some witnesses in Tong Chup, all the bodies were blindfolded, their hands were crossed behind their backs, and their heads were dented inwards. On some of the bodies there were traces of dozens of stab wounds with sharp objects. Next to the corpses was a bent bamboo stick covered in blood. Among the corpses, there were many babies still slinging on their mothers' backs. According to Mr. Lo Ich Vinh, former Chairman of Hung Dao Commune People's Committee, inside the well there were a few AK cartridges and a hammer. Dinh Ngoc Tinh, a Cao Bang veteran said: "On the way to evacuate, my mother and the workers of a pig farm were arrested. The Chinese army took the group back to Tong Chup [...] After the Chinese troops withdrew my brother and I returned home to search for our mother, only to find out that she and 42 other people had been massacred in Tong Chup. My mother was pulled out of the well in a blindfolded, handcuffed position and was stabbed many times by bayonets to the stomach of the Chinese army." Mrs. Do Thi Ha, on the way to escape from the Chinese soldiers, she took shelter in a cellar in Tong Chup village. When the Chinese found her, she was hit by a grenade and carried out of the bunker. She said that at the time of the incident, from her cellar, "loud screams and curses could be heard coming from the basements" and "the sound of children crying".
