= Xiong County =

Xiong County 雄县
- County
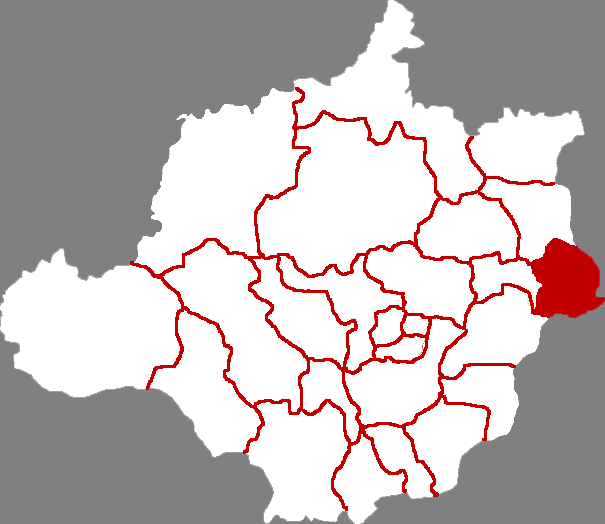
- Location in Baoding

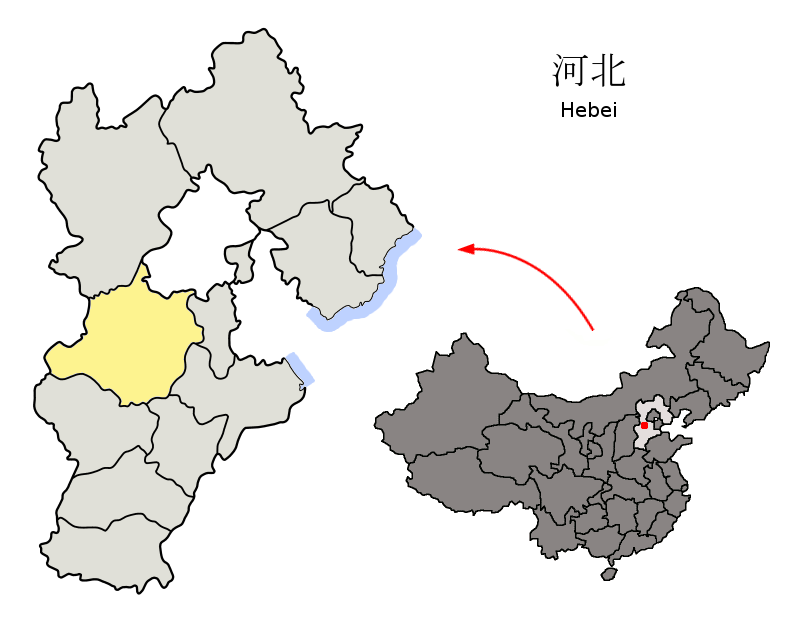
- Baoding in Hebei
- Coordinates: 38°59′41″N 116°06′31″E
- Country: People's Republic of China
- Province: Hebei
- Prefecture-level city: Baoding
- Time zone: UTC+8 (China Standard)
- Website: www.xiongxian.gov.cn

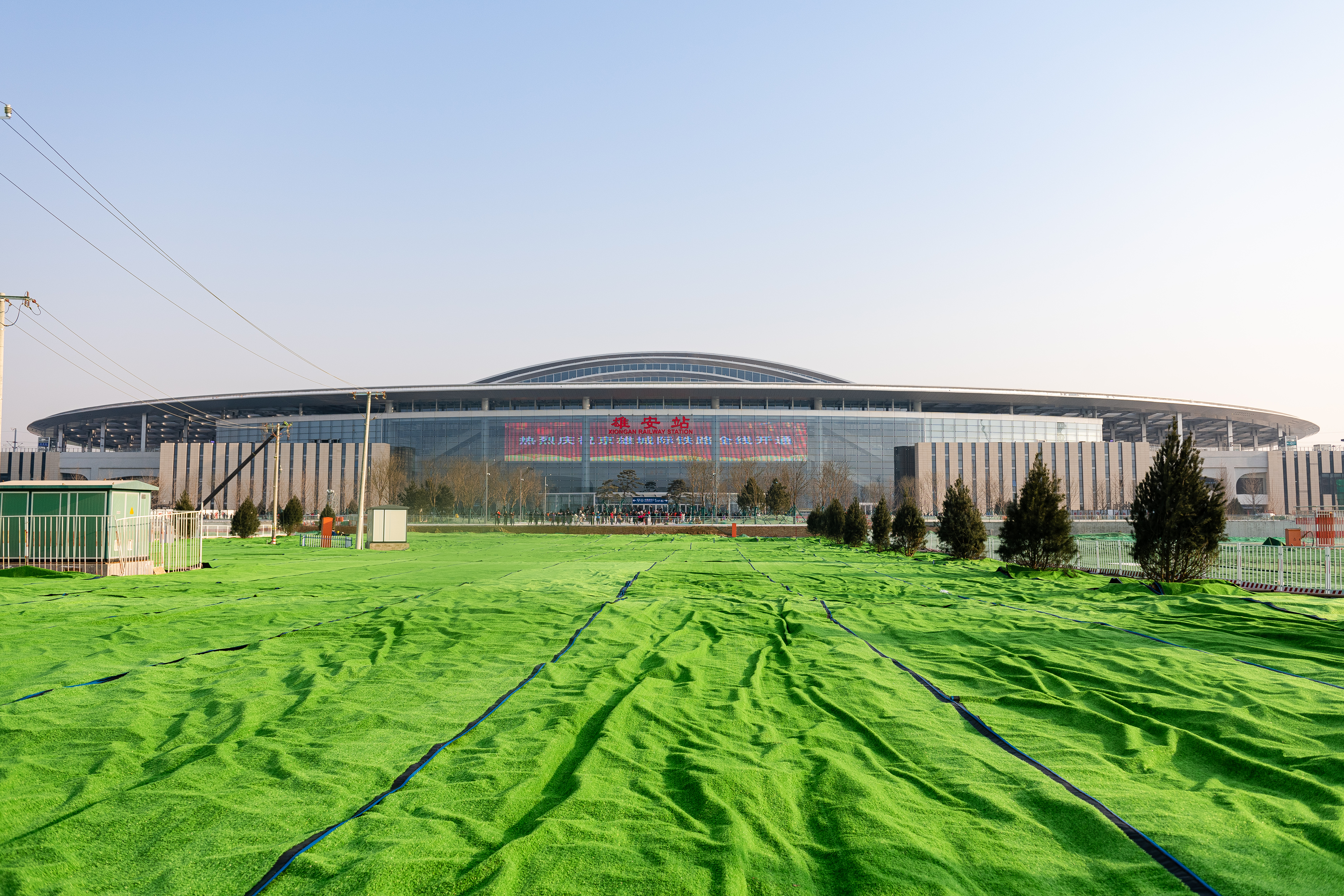
Xiong'an railway station in Guanlimahu Village, Zangang Town, Xiong County

Xiong County or Xiongxian (Chinese: 雄县; pinyin: Xióng Xiàn) is a county in the central part of Hebei province, China. It is the easternmost county-level division of the prefecture-level city of Baoding.

It is part of the Xiong'an New Area designated by national government in April 2017.

== Administrative divisions ==
Towns:

- Xiongzhou (雄州镇), Zangang (昝岗镇), Daying (大营镇)

Townships:

- Longwan Township (龙湾乡), Zhugezhuang Township (朱各庄乡), Mijiawu Township (米家务乡), Shuangtang Township (双堂乡), Zhanggang Township (张岗乡), Beishakou Township (北沙口乡)

== Climate ==
Climate data for Xiongxian, elevation 10 m (33 ft), (1991–2020 normals, extremes 1981–present)
Month	Jan	Feb	Mar	Apr	May	Jun	Jul	Aug	Sep	Oct	Nov	Dec	Year
Record high °C (°F)	15.3 (59.5)	20.6 (69.1)	29.5 (85.1)	33.5 (92.3)	38.5 (101.3)	40.2 (104.4)	40.9 (105.6)	38.1 (100.6)	34.6 (94.3)	30.9 (87.6)	23.2 (73.8)	14.7 (58.5)	40.9 (105.6)
Mean daily maximum °C (°F)	2.1 (35.8)	6.1 (43.0)	14.2 (57.6)	21.6 (70.9)	28.0 (82.4)	31.4 (88.5)	32.1 (89.8)	30.7 (87.3)	26.6 (79.9)	19.8 (67.6)	10.7 (51.3)	3.8 (38.8)	18.9 (66.1)
Daily mean °C (°F)	−4.3 (24.3)	−0.4 (31.3)	7.5 (45.5)	15.0 (59.0)	21.5 (70.7)	25.4 (77.7)	27.0 (80.6)	25.6 (78.1)	20.4 (68.7)	12.9 (55.2)	4.2 (39.6)	−2.4 (27.7)	12.7 (54.9)
Mean daily minimum °C (°F)	−9.5 (14.9)	−5.6 (21.9)	1.4 (34.5)	8.4 (47.1)	14.9 (58.8)	19.7 (67.5)	22.7 (72.9)	21.4 (70.5)	15.5 (59.9)	7.5 (45.5)	−0.6 (30.9)	−7.1 (19.2)	7.4 (45.3)
Record low °C (°F)	−17.2 (1.0)	−16.1 (3.0)	−9.6 (14.7)	−1.5 (29.3)	5.4 (41.7)	10.8 (51.4)	16.1 (61.0)	12.5 (54.5)	5.9 (42.6)	−4.1 (24.6)	−11.1 (12.0)	−17.9 (−0.2)	−17.9 (−0.2)
Average precipitation mm (inches)	2.4 (0.09)	5.5 (0.22)	8.1 (0.32)	21.3 (0.84)	28.0 (1.10)	61.1 (2.41)	168.5 (6.63)	114.7 (4.52)	51.7 (2.04)	29.0 (1.14)	12.9 (0.51)	2.0 (0.08)	505.2 (19.9)
Average precipitation days (≥ 0.1 mm)	1.5	2.0	2.8	4.5	6.1	8.1	12.2	9.6	6.6	4.9	3.2	1.7	63.2
Average snowy days	2.7	2.0	1.0	0.1	0	0	0	0	0	0	1.4	2.1	9.3
Average relative humidity (%)	57	53	48	51	54	61	74	78	72	68	66	61	62
Mean monthly sunshine hours	145.4	155.6	206.3	227.8	253.4	218.1	190.1	196.4	198.2	182.8	149.2	142.7	2,266
Percentage possible sunshine	48	51	55	57	57	49	42	47	54	54	50	49	51
Source: China Meteorological Administration
