= 2nd Armed Police Division =

2nd Division (1949–55) 2nd Infantry Division (1955–60) 2nd Army Division (1960–85) 2nd Infantry Division (1985–96) 2nd Armed Police Mobile Division (1996–2017)
- Active: February 1949 - 2017
- Country: People's Republic of China
- Branch: People's Liberation Army, People's Volunteer Army, People's Armed Police
- Type: Gendarmerie
- Role: Civil defense, Rapid reaction force
- Size: Detachment
- Part of: 2nd Mobile Corps
- Garrison/HQ: Yixing, Jiangsu province
- Engagements: Chinese Civil War, Korean War, Vietnam War, Sino-Vietnamese War

The 2nd Armed Police Division was a unit of the People's Armed Police of the People's Republic of China.

The 2nd Division (Chinese: 第2师) was created in February 1949 under the Regulation of the Redesignations of All Organizations and Units of the Army, issued by Central Military Commission on November 1, 1948, basing on the 5th Route, Jizhong Guerrilla Army formed in late 1937.

The division was part of 1st Corps (now 1st Army) until 1996. Under the flag of 2nd division it took part in the Chinese Civil War. In June 1952 it absorbed the 8th Division from the 3rd Corps.

In early 1953 the division was composed of:

- 4th Regiment;
- 5th Regiment (former 23rd Regiment, 8th Division);
- 6th Regiment;
- 207th Tank Self-Propelled Artillery Regiment (former 24th Regiment, 8th Division);
- 302nd Artillery Regiment (former 5th Regiment, 2nd Division);

In February 1953 the division entered Korea to took part in Korean War under the command of the Corps. Since then it became a part of the People's Volunteer Army until 1958.

In 1955 it renamed as the 2nd Infantry Division (Chinese: 步兵第2师).

In 1958 it moved to Kaifeng, Henan province with the Corps HQ.

In 1960 it renamed as the 2nd Army Division (Chinese: 陆军第2师).

In January 1961 it became one of the "middle" division under PLA glossaries, as a fully equipped but not fully manned division.

In 1962 the division was designated as a "Northern" unit, Catalogue A.

In 1968 the 207th Tank Self-Propelled Artillery Regiment was detached from the division and formed the later 42nd Tank Regiment of the 11th Tank Division.

The division was basically not affected during the army re-designation in December 1969. Its 302nd Artillery Regiment was renamed as Artillery Regiment, 2nd Army Division.

In the 1970s the division catalogue was unknown.

In 1975 the division moved to Zhejiang Province with the Corps HQ to replace 20th Corps. Since then the division is stationed in Hangzhou, Zhejiang Province.

In 1985 the division was converted to an infantry division, renamed the 2nd Infantry Division (Chinese: 步兵第2师). The division then maintained as a Northern Infantry Division, Catalogue B unit.

By then the division was composed of:

- 4th Infantry Regiment;
- 5th Infantry Regiment;
- 6th Infantry Regiment;
- Artillery Regiment;

In 1996 the division was transferred to the People's Armed Police and converted to the 2nd Armed Police Division (Chinese: 武警第2师) as follows:

- The Infantry Battalions are converted to Mobile Battalions;
- The Machine gun-Artillery Battalion in each infantry regiment converted to a forth Mobile Battalion of the Regiment;
- The artillery regiment of the division was converted to a fourth (mobile) Regiment.

By then the division was composed of:

- 4th Armed Police Regiment;
- 5th Armed Police Regiment;
- 6th Armed Police Regiment;
- 709th Armed Police Regiment;

After the 2017 reform, the division was divided into three independent detachments (regiment-sized): the 1st Mobile Detachment (Chinese: 机动第1支队), the 2nd Mobile Detachment (Chinese: 机动第2支队) and the 3rd Mobile Detachment (Chinese: 机动第3支队) under the PAP 2nd Mobile Contingent (Chinese: 武警第2机动总队).
