= 11th Armored Brigade (People's Republic of China) =

Brigade of the People's Liberation Army

11th Tank Division (1968–98) 11th Armored Division (1998–2011) 11th Armored Brigade (2011–17) 11th Heavy Combined Arms Brigade (2017–)
- Country: People's Republic of China
- Branch: People's Liberation Army Ground Force
- Type: Combined Arms, Armored
- Size: Brigade
- Part of: 83rd Group Army
- Garrison/HQ: Queshan, Henan

The 11th Tank Division (Chinese: 坦克第11师) was formed on September 15, 1968, in Xinyang, Henan province from 206th Tank Self-Propelled Artillery Regiment from 1st Army Division, 207th Tank Self-Propelled Artillery Regiment from 2nd Army Division, 212th Tank Self-Propelled Artillery Regiment from 3rd Army Division and 45th Tank Self-Propelled Artillery Regiment from 29th Army Division.

As of September 10, 1969, the division was composed of:

- 41st Tank Regiment (former 206th Tank Self-Propelled Artillery Regiment);
- 42nd Tank Regiment (former 207th Tank Self-Propelled Artillery Regiment);
- 43rd Tank Regiment (former 212th Tank Self-Propelled Artillery Regiment);
- 44th Tank Regiment (former 45th Tank Self-Propelled Artillery Regiment).

The division was in strength of 3000 personnel, 112 T-34s (1 battalion of 24 tanks, 1 regimental commander tank and 1 regimental commissar tank for each tank regiment) and 80 SU-76s (1 battalion of 20 self-propelled guns for each regiment).

The division maintained as a tank division, catalogue B during the 1970s and early-1980s.

From 1970 the division became the general reserve of Central Military Commune of China.

In 1971 42nd, 43rd and 44th Tank Regiment received Type-59 medium tanks (80 each). 41st Tank Regiment was also filled up to 80 T-34s.

On March 1, 1973, Artillery Regiment, 50th Army Division was attached to the division and renamed Artillery Regiment, 11th Tank Division.

In April 1974 the division moved to Queshan, Henan province.

In 1976 Armored Infantry Regiment Activated. In February 41st Tank Regiment was transferred to 54th Army Corps and renamed as Tank Regiment, 54th Army Corps.

By then the division was composed of:

- 42nd Tank Regiment;
- 43rd Tank Regiment;
- 44th Tank Regiment;
- Armored Infantry Regiment;
- Artillery Regiment.

From January 1976 to December 1982, the division maintained as a "Tank Division, Catalogue A". From December 1982 the division became a "Tank Division, Catalogue B".

From March 1983 the division was under the command of 43rd Army Corps.

In 1985 the division was transferred to 20th Army following 43rd Army Corps disbandment. In September this year 44th Tank Regiment was detached to form Tank Brigade, 54th Army, and in November a new 44th Tank Regiment was re-activated.

In July 1998 the division was transferred to 54th Army following 20th Army's disbandment. In October the division was renamed as the 11th Armored Division (Chinese: 装甲第11师), and its Armored Infantry Regiment was disbanded and absorbed into now armored regiments.

By then the division was composed of:

- 42nd Armored Regiment;
- 43rd Armored Regiment;
- 44th Armored Regiment;
- Artillery Regiment.

The division remained with the 54th Group Army until at least 2006, when it was noted to be based in Xinyang in Henan province.

In October 2011 the division was split into two: the division itself became the 11th Armored Brigade (Chinese: 装甲第11旅), while half of its battalions formed 160th Mechanized Infantry Brigade.

In 2017 the brigade was reorganized as the 11th Heavy Combined Arms Brigade (Chinese: 重型合成第11旅).
