= 2nd Mobile Corps =

126th Division (1949–1996) 126th Armed Police Division (1996–2017) 2nd Mobile Corps (2017–)
- 一二六师 (1949–1996) 武警第一二六师(1996–2017) 武警第二机动总队(2017–)
- Flag of the People's Armed Police
- Active: 1949–(People's Liberation Army Ground Force); 1996 – (People's Armed Police)
- Country: China
- Agency: People's Armed Police
- Type: Gendarmerie
- Role: Rapid Reaction Force
- Operations jurisdiction: Southern China, Southwestern China and East China
- Headquarters: Fuzhou

Notables
- Significant operation(s): Korean War

Equipment
- Aircraft: Z-20 PAP

The 2nd Mobile Corps, also translated as 2nd Mobile Contingent, is one of two Mobile Corps (the other being the 1st Mobile Contingent) of the People's Armed Police and is headquartered in Changle district, Fuzhou.

== History ==
The 126th Division was a military formation deployed by the People's Republic of China as part of the People's Volunteer Army (Chinese People's Volunteers (CPV) or Chinese Communist Forces (CCF) during the Korean War. It had a standard strength of approximately 10,000 men. It was a component of the 42nd Army, consisting of the 376th, 377th, and 378th Regiments.

In 1996, it was transferred to the People's Armed Police and was renamed to the 126th Armed Police Division. It was stationed in Huadu district, Guangzhou and consisted of the 373rd Armed Police Regiment stationed in Huadu district, Guangdong, the 376th Armed Police Regiment stationed in Leiyang, Hengyang, the 378th Armed Police Regiment stationed in Leiyang, Hengyang and the 712nd Armed Police Regiment stationed in Huadu district, Guangzhou.

In 2017, the 126th Armed Police Division became the 2nd Mobile Corps of the People's Armed Police and was merged with the 181st Armed Police Division, the 93rd Armed Police Division, 41st Armed Police Division, the 38th Armed Police Division and the 2nd Armed Police Division.

== Units ==
- 1st Mobile Detachment – Stationed in Wuxi
- 2nd Mobile Detachment – Stationed in Wuxi
- 3rd Mobile Detachment – Stationed in Yixing
- 4th Mobile Detachment – Stationed in Putian
- 5th Mobile Detachment – Stationed in Putian
- 6th Mobile Detachment – Stationed in Guangzhou
- 7th Mobile Detachment – Stationed in Foshan
- 8th Mobile Detachment – Stationed in Mengzi, Honghe
- 9th Mobile Detachment – Stationed in Nanchong
- 1st Special Operations Detachment (Snow Leopard commando unit) – Stationed in Guangzhou
- 2nd Special Operations Detachment – Stationed in Huzhou
- 1st Transportation Detachment – Stationed in Hefei
- 2nd Transportation Detachment – Stationed in Mianyang
- 3rd Transportation Detachment – Stationed in Bomê County, Nyingchi
- Engineering and Chemical Defense Detachment, Stationed in Changle District, Fuzhou
- Helicopter Detachment – Operates Z-20 Helicopters
  - First Group, Stationed in Xinglong town, Zhongjiang County, Deyang
  - Second Group, Stationed in Zhangshu town, Xiangyin County, Yueyang
  - Third Group, Stationed in Pingyin Xiaozhi airport, Xiaozhi town, Pingyin County, Jinan

== Mission ==
The 2nd Mobile Contingent is a rapid reaction force of the People's Armed Police used to rapidly respond to major incidents (such as terrorist threats, riots and natural disasters) in Southern china, Southwest China and East China.
