= China's Defense White Paper =

Chinese military policy

China's Defense White Paper is a document published by China mostly every two years that outlines its National Defense Strategy. (Note: The National Security Strategy is not published)

== List ==
List of White Paper's on China's National Defense
| Sr No | Year | Date Published | Title | Notes |
|---|---|---|---|---|
| 1 | 2019 | July | China's National Defense in the New Era | |
| 2 | 2014 | 26 May 2015 | China's Military Strategy | Elaborates military struggle, local wars, informatized wars |
| 3 | 2012 | 16 April 2013 | Diversified Employment of China's Armed Forces | Publishes PLA designations and sizes |
| 4 | 2010 | 31 March | China's National Defense in 2010 | Modernization of military legal system; creation of military security mechanism for Taiwan straits |
| 5 | 2008 | 20 January | China's National Defense in 2008 | Reveals China's defense expenditure for the first time |
| 6 | 2006 | December | China's National Defense in 2006 | First comprehensive analysis of defense environment |
| 7 | 2004 | 27 December | China's National Defense in 2004 | Discusses the revolution in military affairs |
| 8 | 2002 | 9 December | China's National Defense in 2002 | Five national interests |
| 9 | 2000 | October | China's National Defense in 2000 | Taiwan discussed for the first time |
| 10 | 1998 | July | China's National Defense in 1998 | |
| 11 | 1995 | November | China: Arms Control and Disarmament | |
