= 3rd Corps (People's Republic of China) =

Former Chinese military unit

3rd Corps (1949–52)
- Active: February 1949–June 1952
- Country: China
- Allegiance: Chinese Communist Party
- Branch: People's Liberation Army Ground Force
- Garrison/HQ: Zhangye, Gansu
- Engagements: Chinese Civil War

The 3rd Corps (Chinese: 第3军) was a military formation of the Chinese People's Liberation Army that existed from 1949 to 1952.

The 3rd Corps was activated on February 1, 1949, from 3rd Column, Northwest Field Army. Its history could be traced to 3rd Column of Jinsui Military Region formed on November 10, 1947.

The corps took part in the Chinese Civil War under the command of Northwest Field Army, including the Qinghai Campaign and Gansu Campaign. By mid 1949 the corps was composed of 7th, 8th and 9th Divisions.

From September 1949 the corps was stationed in Zhangye-Wuwei-Jiuquan area for Bandit Suppressing missions, during which the Corps absorbed a defected Republic of China Army cavalry regiment, an independent regiment and a camel cavalry regiment.

In June 1952, the 3rd Corps was merged with the 1st Corps:

- Headquarters, 3rd Corps was converted to Military and Political Officer Academy of Northwestern Military Region;
- 7th Division absorbed 9th Division, and was transferred to 1st Corps' control;
- 8th Division was absorbed by 2nd Division, 1st Corps.
