= People's Liberation Army Academy of Military Sciences =

Research institute of the People's Liberation Army

Academy of Military Sciences
- 中国人民解放军军事科学院
- Type: Military research institute
- Established: March 15, 1958; 67 years ago
- Parent institution: People's Liberation Army
- President: General Yang Xuejun
- Location: Beijing, China; 40.011°N 116.247°E
- Website: www.ams.ac.cn

The Academy of Military Sciences (Chinese: 中国人民解放军军事科学院) is the highest-level research institute of the People's Liberation Army (PLA). It is headquartered in Beijing. The academy was founded in March 1958 and as of 2002, its staff included approximately 500 researchers, making it the largest research institution in the PLA. Its president is General Yang Xuejun (since June 2017) while General Ling Huanxin is the political commissar.

== Functions ==
The AMS researches issues related to "national defence, armed forces development, and military operations." It works under the direction of the Central Military Commission and its Joint staff Department. More broadly, it coordinates research conducted by the various PLA institutions.

According to Bates Gill and James Mulvenon, "AMS researchers write reports for the military leadership, ghost-write speeches for top military leaders, and serve on temporary and permanent leading small groups as drafters of important documents like the Defence White Paper. The AMS also conducts analysis on foreign militaries, strategy, and doctrine, and has consistently taken the lead role in the study of the future of warfare."

In 2022, the AMS reported that a team of military scientists inserted a gene from the tardigrade into human embryonic stem cells in an experiment with the stated possibility of enhancing soldiers' resistance to acute radiation syndrome in order to survive nuclear fallout.

In 2024, AMS researchers were reported to have developed a military tool using Llama, which Meta Platforms said was unauthorized due to its model use prohibition for military purposes.

== See also ==
- Academy of Military Medical Sciences
