= Southern Theater Command =

Chinese military command region

- 南部战区
- Founded: 1 February 2016; 10 years ago
- Country: China
- Type: Theater Command
- Role: Command and control
- Part of: People's Liberation Army
- Headquarters: Guangzhou, Guangdong
- Website: Official website

Commanders
- Commander: General Wu Yanan
- Political Commisar: General Wang Wenquan
- Chief of Staff: Lieutenant General Wang Xianfeng

Insignia
- Sleeve insignia

The Southern Theater Command (Chinese: 南部战区; pinyin: Nánbù zhànqū) is one of the five theater commands of the People's Liberation Army. Founded on 1 February 2016, its predecessor was the Guangzhou Military Region. Its jurisdiction includes Guangdong, Guangxi, Hunan, Yunnan, Hainan and the South Sea Fleet, as well as the Special Administrative Regions of Hong Kong and Macau.

== Area of responsibility ==
The Southern Theater Command's jurisdiction includes Guangdong, Guangxi, Hunan, Yunnan, Hainan and the South Sea Fleet, as well as the Special Administrative Regions of Hong Kong and Macau. Southern Theater Command's area of responsibility (AOR) includes Myanmar, Laos, Vietnam (Mainland Southeast Asia) and the South China Sea. The command's primary missions are maintaining security in the South China Sea and supporting the Eastern Theater Command in any major Taiwan Contingency.

== Organizational structure ==
The Southern Theater Command consists of the following components:

- Southern Theater Command
  - Southern Theater Command Ground Force
    - 74th Group Army
      - 1st Amphibious Combined Arms Brigade
      - 125th Amphibious Combined Arms Brigade
      - 132rd Light Combined Arms Brigade
      - 163rd Light Combined Arms Brigade
      - 154th Medium Combined Arms Brigade
      - 16th Heavy Combined Arms Brigade
      - 74th Special Operations Brigade
      - 74th Army Aviation Brigade
      - 74th Artillery Brigade
      - 74th Air Defense Brigade
      - 74th Engineer and Chemical Defense Brigade
      - 74th Sustainment Brigade
    - 75th Group Army
      - 32nd Mountain Combined Arms Brigade
      - 37th Light Combined Arms Brigade
      - 42nd Light Combined Arms Brigade
      - 122nd Medium Combined Arms Brigade
      - 31st Heavy Combined Arms Brigade
      - 123rd Heavy Combined Arms Brigade
      - 121st Air Assault Brigade
      - 75th Special Operation Brigade
      - 75th Artillery Brigade
      - 75th Air Defense Brigade
      - 75th Engineer and Chemical Defense Brigade
      - 75th Sustainment Brigade
  - Southern Theater Command Navy (South Sea Fleet)
    - 2nd Destroyer Detachment
    - 9th Destroyer Detachment
    - 17th Frigate Detachment
    - 18th Frigate Detachment
    - 19th Frigate Detachment
    - 32nd Submarine Detachment
    - 52nd Submarine Detachment
    - 6th Landing Ship Detachment
    - 3rd Combat Support Ship Detachment
    - Danger and Lifesaver Detachment
  - Southern Theater Command Air Force
    - 2nd Independent Regiment
    - 2nd Fighter Division
    - 8th Bomber Division
    - 9th Fighter Division
    - 13th Transport Division
    - 18th Fighter Division
    - 42nd Fighter Division

== List of leaders ==
=== Commanders ===
English name	Chinese name	Took office	Left office	Notes
Wang Jiaocheng	王教成	February 2016	January 2017	
Yuan Yubai	袁誉柏	January 2017	June 2021	
Wang Xiubin	王秀斌	June 2021	July 2024	
Wu Yanan	吴亚男	July 2024	Incumbent	

=== Political commissars ===
English name	Chinese name	Took office	Left office	Notes
Wei Liang	魏亮	February 2016	April 2018	
Wang Jianwu	王建武	December 2018	December 2023	
Wang Wenquan	王文全	December 2023	Incumbent	

=== Chief of Staff ===
English name	Chinese name	Took office	Left office	Notes
Jia Jiancheng	贾建成		unknown	
Wang Xianfeng	王显峰		Incumbent	

== See also ==
- Southern Theater Command Ground Force
- Southern Theater Command Air Force
- Southern Theater Command Navy
- Hong Kong Garrison
- Macao Garrison
