= 74th Group Army =

Chinese military unit

- 第七十四集团军
- Active: 1949-present
- Country: China
- Branch: People's Liberation Army Ground Force
- Type: Group army
- Part of: Southern Theater Command Ground Force
- Garrison/HQ: Huizhou, Guangdong
- Engagements: World War II; Chinese Civil War; Korean War; Vietnam War; Sino-Vietnamese War

Commanders
- Current commander: Major General Huang Xucong
- Political commissar: Major General Liu Hongjun
- Notable commanders: Wu Kehua; Li Zuocheng

Insignia
- NATO Map Symbol

The 74th Group Army (Chinese: 第七十四集团军; pinyin: Dì Qīshísì Jítuánjūn), Unit 31661, formerly the 42nd Group Army, is a military formation of the Chinese People's Liberation Army Ground Force (PLAGF). The 74th Group Army is one of thirteen total group armies of the PLAGF, the largest echelon of ground forces in the People's Republic of China, and one of two assigned to the nation's Southern Theater Command.

== History ==
During the Korean War, the Army was part of the People's Volunteer Army (Chinese People's Volunteers (CPV) or Chinese Communist Forces (CCF)) XIII Army Group. It was composed of the 124th, 125th, and 126th Divisions.

During the Korean War, the 42nd Army was commanded by Lieutenant General Wu Ruilin.

Major CPV forces did not enter Korea until the night of Oct. 16, 1950, when the 124th Division, of the 42nd Army of the XIIIth Army Group crossed the Yalu River opposite Manp'ojin. On the 16th it started on foot from Manp'ojin, marching southeast through Kanggye and Yudam-ni to Hagaru-ri. From there its advanced elements proceeded to the point south of the Changjin Reservoir where they met the ROK 26th Regiment on 25 October. The remainder of the division moved up to the point of contact and joined in the battle near Sudong against the U.S. 1st Marine Division troops that replaced the ROK 26th Regiment.

The 42nd Army and the 38th Army were pouring through the broken South Korean lines to Eighth Army's east and threatening to envelop the entire force.

The west flank units of this army, elements of the 125th Division, overlapped into the Eighth Army zone and apparently constituted the enemy force that dispersed the ROK 7th Regiment below Ch'osan at the end of October 1950.

In October 1952 the 46th Army replaced the 42nd Army and they were rotated back to China.

== Organization ==
The 74th Group Army appears to comprise six combined-arms maneuver brigades, which includes one heavy (armored), one medium (mechanized), two amphibious and two light (motorized) brigades, each brigade leads four combined-arms battalions. These combined arms brigades are the PLAGF's basic operational unit, likely following the United States' and later Russia's transition from division-centric warfare to brigade-centric warfare. The 74th Group Army also commands six combat support brigades.

Since 2017, the 74th Group Army commanded the following subordinate units.

- 1st Amphibious Combined-Arms Brigade (ZTD-05, ZBD-05)
- 16th Heavy Combined-Arms Brigade (ZTZ-96, ZBD-86A)
- 125th Amphibious Combined-Arms Brigade (ZTD-05, ZBD-05)
- 132nd Light Combined-Arms Brigade
- 154th Medium Combined-Arms Brigade (ZTL-11, ZBL-08)
- 163rd Light Combined-Arms Brigade
- 74th Special Operations Brigade
- 74th Army Aviation Brigade (Mi-17, Z-9, Z-10)
- 74th Air Defense Brigade
- 74th Artillery Brigade
- 74th Engineering and Chemical Defense Brigade
- 74th Service Support Brigade
