= First Field Army =

Chinese Communist Party military formation

The First Field Army of the Chinese Communist Party was a military formation in the last stages of the Chinese Civil War (1949–1950).

The Northwest Field Army was originally under the command of Peng Dehuai with He Long and Xi Zhongxun as political commissars, which originally operated in Shanxi, Shaanxi, and Ningxia. It was 175,000 strong; most of its soldiers had been under the command of He Long during the war against Japan. He then became Peng's second-in-command. Peng's notable subordinates in the Northwest Field Army included Zhang Zongxun and Wang Zhen.

Peng's forces were the most poorly armed of the newly re-organized army but were responsible for the area around the Chinese Communist Party (CCP) revolutionary base area, Yan'an. In March 1947, Kuomintang General Hu Zongnan, invaded the area with 260,000 soldiers. Hu's forces were among the best-trained and most well-supplied Nationalist units, but Xiong Xianghui, one of Zhou Enlai's spies, was able to provide Peng with information about Hu's strategic plans, his forces' troop distributions, strength, and positions, and details about the air cover available to Hu. Peng was forced to abandon Yan'an in late March but resisted Hu's forces long enough for Mao and other senior party leaders to evacuate safely. Mao wanted Peng to provoke a decisive confrontation with Hu immediately, but Peng dissuaded him. By April, Mao agreed that Peng's objective was to "keep the enemy on the run... tire him out completely, reduce his food supplies, and then look for an opportunity to destroy him."

On January 15, 1949, the CCP Central Military Commission decided to reorganize the regional armies of the PLA into four field armies.

On February 1, 1949, the joint defense military area command covering the Shaanxi, Gansu, Ningxia, Shanxi and Suiyuan provinces was renamed the Northwest Military Area Command and the Northwest Field Army was renamed the First Field Army of the PLA.

The forces in Northwest China were designated the First Field Army, with Peng Dehuai as commander and also serving as political commissar. The First Field Army was to comprise the 1st Corps Army and 2nd Corps Army, and totalled 134,000 men. After 1949, the First Field Army controlled five provinces - Shaanxi, Gansu, Qinghai, Ningxia, and Xinjiang.

Among forces associated with the Field Field Army were the First Army (1st, 2nd, and 7th Corps), Second Army (3rd, 4th, and 6th Corps), Nineteenth Army (63rd, 64th, and 65th Corps), Shaanxi Military Region, Ningxia Military Region, Qinghai Military Region, and forces in Xinjiang - the 5th Corps, and the Twenty-Second Army under Tao Zhiyue, with the 9th Corps and the 7th and 8th Cavalry Divisions.

Swaine, citing Witson, wrote in 1992 that '..most former units of the First FA were either deactivated after the Korean War, reassigned as replacements for Korean War units associated with other field armies, or redesignated..' (becoming units of the Xinjiang Production and Construction Corps). Swaine goes on to say that '..The few remaining First FA combat units were transferred out of the region, to areas such as Central China or Tibet.' The best elements of the 4th Corps were reorganised as the 11th Division, which entered Tibet in 1962 and has remained there ever since. In recent years this formation has been referred to as a Highland Motorised Infantry Division.

William Witson argued, in his pathbreaking work on PLA factions, The Chinese High Command (1972), that personal relationships within the five 'field army systems' '..served as the foundations for a geographically based pattern of factional affiliations within the overall structure of communist power.' Swaine, writing in 1992, noted that these relationships had deteriorated significantly. Swaine argued that few senior military leaders from the 'First Field Army system', as he put it, survived by 1992.
