= XXXXIII Corps =

XXXXIII Corps, XLIII Corps, or 43rd Corps may refer to:

- 43rd Corps (People's Republic of China)
- XXXXIII Army Corps (Wehrmacht)
- 43rd Army Corps (Russian Empire)
- 43rd Army Corps (Soviet Union)
- 43rd (Fallowfield) Lancashire Rifle Volunteer Corps, United Kingdom

== See also ==
- List of military corps by number
- 43rd Army (disambiguation)
- 43rd Battalion (disambiguation)
- 43rd Brigade (disambiguation)
- 43rd Division (disambiguation)
- 43rd Regiment (disambiguation)
- 43rd Squadron (disambiguation)
- 43rd (disambiguation)
