= 43rd Army =

43rd Army may refer to:

- Forty-Third Army (Japan), Imperial Japanese Army
- 43rd Army (Soviet Union)
- 43rd Rocket Army, Soviet Union/Ukraine

== See also ==
- List of armies by number
- 43rd Division (disambiguation)
- 43rd Brigade (disambiguation)
- 43rd Regiment (disambiguation)
- 43rd Battalion (disambiguation)
- 43rd Squadron (disambiguation)
- 43rd (disambiguation)
