= 43rd Cavalry =

43rd Cavalry may refer to:

- 43rd Cavalry Division, Soviet Union
- 43rd Cavalry Regiment, United States
- 43rd Virginia Cavalry Battalion, Confederate States Army
- 43rd (Suffolk) Company, Imperial Yeomanry

== See also ==
- 43rd Division (disambiguation)
- 43rd Brigade (disambiguation)
- 43rd Regiment (disambiguation)
- 43rd (disambiguation)
