= Battle of the Soyang River =

1951 battle of the Korean War

- Part of the Korean War
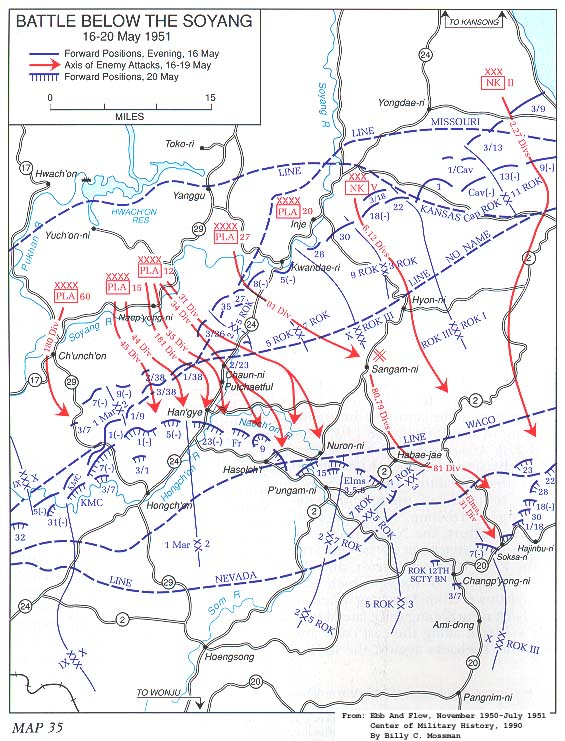
- Battle of Soyang River map
Date	16–22 May 1951
Location	Soyang River
Result	see #Aftermath

Belligerents
United Nations: United States; South Korea; France; Netherlands	China; North Korea

Commanders and leaders
(United Nations) Matthew Ridgway (United States) James Van Fleet (First Republic of Korea) Lee Hyung-geun (First Republic of Korea) Yu Jae-hung	(China) Peng Dehuai

Units involved
(United States) 2nd Infantry Division (United States) 7th Infantry Division (United States) 1st Marine Division (First Republic of Korea) I Corps (First Republic of Korea) III Corps (French Fourth Republic) French Battalion; Netherlands Battalion	(China) 12th Army; 15th Army; 20th Army; 27th Army; 60th Army (North Korea) II Corps; V Corps

Strength
8 divisions	138,000 Chinese; 38,000 North Koreans

Casualties and losses
UN sources: 8,769 total casualties (United States) 1,221 casualties Chinese estimate: 44,000 total casualties	Chinese sources: 40,000 total casualties UN estimate: 90,609 total casualties

The Battle of the Soyang River, also referred to as the "May Massacre", or Battle of Hyeon-ri (Korean: 현리 전투, Chinese: 縣里戰役) in Korean and Chinese was fought during the Korean War between United Nations Command (UN) and the Chinese People's Volunteer Army (PVA) and Korean People's Army (KPA) during the Spring Offensive of April–May 1951. The attack took place across the entire front but with the main thrust below the Soyang River in the Taebaek Mountains. The objective of the main effort was to sever the six Republic of Korea Army (ROK) divisions on the eastern front from the remainder of the US Eighth Army and annihilate them and the US 2nd Infantry Division. Secondary attacks would be mounted by PVA and KPA forces across the entire front.

The attack was launched on 16 May 1951 and succeeded in swiftly pushing back the ROK I Corps which retreated in good order and ROK III Corps which was routed, while the US 2nd Infantry Division to their left mounted a stronger defense before gradually giving up ground. By 19 May the PVA/KPA advance was losing momentum due to reinforcement of the UN forces, supply difficulties and mounting losses from UN air and artillery strikes. On 20 May the UN launched a counterattack on the west of the front and the PVA/KPA began to withdraw after suffering heavy losses with the offensive coming to an end on 22 May.

== Background ==
Eighth United States Army commander General James Van Fleet expected the PVA's next effort to come either in the west, as had the main force of the April attacks, or on his central front. Judging the Uijongbu-Seoul, Bukhan River, and Chuncheon-Hongch'on corridors to be the most likely axes of enemy advance, he shifted forces by 4 May to place most of his strength and all US divisions in the western and central sectors and aligned the US I, IX and X Corps so that each was responsible for one of these avenues. Deployed around Seoul, I Corps blocked the Uijongbu approach with the US 1st Cavalry and 25th Infantry Divisions and the ROK 1st Division on line, and the US 3rd Infantry Division and British 29th Brigade in reserve. IX Corps, its sector narrowed by a westward shift of its right boundary, now had the British 28th Brigade, US 24th Infantry Division, ROK 2nd Division, ROK 6th Division, and US 7th Infantry Division west to east on the No-Name Line as well as the 187th Airborne Regimental Combat Team (187th RCT) in reserve for defense against an enemy strike down or out of the Bukhan River valley. In the left portion of the X Corps sector, the US 1st Marine Division and the US 2nd Infantry Division, less the bulk of the US 23rd Infantry Regiment in Corps' reserve, covered the Chuncheon-Hongch'on axis. Though the concentration of strength in the western and central areas left the remainder of the front comparatively thin, Van Fleet believed that the six ROK divisions in the east- the 5th and 7th in the right portion of the X Corps sector, the 9th and 3rd in the ROK III Corps sector, and the Capital and 11th in the ROK I Corps sector- could hold the line since opposing KPA forces were weak and since the terrain barriers of the higher Taebaek Mountains favored defense.

On 30 April Van Fleet had ordered intensive patrolling to locate and identify PVA/KPA formations as they continued to move out of contact. Patrols searching 3–5 miles (4.8–8.0 km) above the front during the first two days of May, however, encountered no major enemy force except at the I Corps' left where ROKA 1st Division patrols found the KPA 8th Division deployed astride Route 1. To deepen the search in the west and central areas, Van Fleet ordered patrol bases set up 5–6 miles (8.0–9.7 km) out along a line reaching east as far as Route 24 in the X Corps' sector. Each division fronted by this line was to establish a regimental combat team in a base position organized for perimeter defense. Patrols operating from the bases could work farther north with full fire support, and the forward positions would deepen the defense in the sectors where Van Fleet expected to be most heavily attacked. While the fortification of the No Name Line continued, the front east of Route 24 was to be advanced 6 miles (9.7 km) to 15 miles (24 km) to Line Missouri, both to restore contact and to clear a stretch of Route 24 and a connecting secondary road angling east to the coast for use as a supply route by the ROK divisions defending the sector. Van Fleet also directed a foray to destroy KPA forces in I Corps' west sector after the KPA 8th Division stopped short the 12th Regiment of the ROK 1st Division's attempt to establish a patrol base up Route 1 on 4 May.

The six ROK divisions in the east opened the advance toward Line Missouri on 7 May. Along the coast, ROK I Corps forces met almost no opposition, and on 9 May the ROK 11th Division's tank destroyer battalion moved some 16 miles (26 km) beyond Line Missouri to occupy the town of Kansong, where Route 24 ended in a junction with the coastal highway. Forces of the ROK 5th Division on the left flank of the advance in the X Corps zone reached Line Missouri the same day. The other four divisions, though still as much as 10 miles (16 km) short of the line on 9 May, had made long daily gains against scattered delaying forces. In the west, the bulk of the ROK 1st Division advancing up Route 1 between 7 and 9 May levered KPA forces out of successive positions and finally forced them into a general withdrawal. Setting the 15th Regiment in a patrol base 6 miles up Route 1, General Kang Mun-bong pulled his remaining forces back into his No Name fortifications.

From other bases in the I, IX, and X Corps sectors, patrols doubled the depth of their previous reconnaissance, but had no more success in making firm contact than had patrols working from the No Name Line. Available intelligence in formation indicated that the PVA 64th, 12th, 60th, and 20th Armies were completely off the west and west central fronts for refurbishing and that each of the four armies still in those sectors - the 65th, 63rd, 15th and 27th Armies - had only one division forward as a screen while remaining divisions prepared to resume the offensive. Since there were no firm indications that the resumption was an immediate prospect, however, Van Fleet on 9 May issued plans for returning the Eighth Army to Line Kansas. In the first phase of the return I, IX, and X Corps were to attack, tentatively on 12 May, towards Line Topeka running from Munsan-ni east through Chuncheon, then northeast toward Inje. ROK III and I Corps in the east meanwhile were to continue their attack to Line Missouri, a step which would carry them above Line Kansas.

On 11 May Van Fleet decided against the Topeka advance after changes in the intelligence picture indicated that PVA/KPA forces were within a few days of reopening their offensive. Air observation of enemy troops where none previously had been seen suggested forward movements under cover of darkness, reports told of large enemy reconnaissance patrols, and both agents and prisoners alleged an early resumption of the Spring Offensive. Extensive smoke screens rose north of the 38th Parallel ahead of IX Corps and above the Hwacheon Reservoir in the X Corps sector. Drawing Van Fleet's particular notice were reports that five armies - the 60th, 15th, 12th, 27th, and 20th - were massing west of the Bukhan River for a major attack in the west central sector. In further instructions for defense, Van Fleet ordered the No Name fortifications improved and directed IX Corps commander General William M. Hoge to give special attention to the Bukhan corridor, where the heaviest enemy buildup was reported. Hoge was to place the bulk of the IX Corps artillery on that flank. "I want to stop the Chinese here and hurt him," Van Fleet told Hoge. "I welcome his attack and want to be strong enough in position and fire power to defeat him." Lavish artillery fire, in particular, was to be used. If gun positions could be kept supplied with ammunition, Van Fleet wanted five times the normal day of fire expended against enemy attacks. As calculated by his supply officer, Colonel Stebbins, the "Van Fleet day of fire" could be supported for at least seven days, although transportation could become a problem since Stebbins could not haul other supplies while handling that amount of ammunition. Rations and petroleum products already stocked in corps sectors, however, would last for more than seven days.

Immediate army reserves for the advance to Line Topeka were to have been the 3rd Division, to be withdrawn from I Corps, and the newly arrived 25th Canadian Infantry Brigade. Though the Topeka advance was off, Van Fleet ordered the 25th Canadian Infantry Brigade to move north, beginning on 15 May, to Kumnyangjang-ni, 25 miles (40 km) southeast of Seoul, and prepare to counter any enemy penetration in the Bukhan or Seoul-Suwon corridors. The 3rd Division was still to pass to army reserve and organize forces capable of reinforcing or counterattacking in the I, IX or X Corps sectors in at least regimental combat team strength on six hours' notice. Beginning on 11 May the 15th Regimental Combat Team assembled near Ich'on, at the intersection of Routes 13 and 20 35 miles (56 km) southeast of Seoul, ready to move on call into the X Corps sector; for operations in support of the IX Corps, the 65th Regimental Combat Team assembled near Kyongan-ni, 20 miles (32 km) southeast of Seoul and directly below the Bukhan River corridor; and the 7th Regimental Combat Team assembled in Seoul for missions in the I Corps' sector.

The six ROK divisions on the eastern front were to stay forward of the No Name Line, but were not to make further attempts to occupy Line Missouri. In the X Corps' sector, the ROK 5th and 7th Divisions, whose forces had all but reached the Soyang River southwest of Inje, were to fortify their present positions. ROK III and I Corps were to set their four divisions in fortified defenses between the lower bank of the Soyang south of Inje and the town of Kangson-ni, 5 miles (8.0 km) north of Yangyang on the coast, after conducting spoiling attacks on 12 May in the two principal communications centers ahead of them, Inje and Yongdae-ri, the latter located on Route 24 15 miles (24 km) northeast of Inje. The reconnaissance company of the ROK 9th Division already had entered Inje without a fight during the afternoon of 11 May and dispersed an enemy force about a mile beyond the town before retiring on 12 May, but other forces of the two ROK Corps were prevented by distance and moderate resistance from reaching the objectives of their attacks in the one day allotted for them.

Light contact along the remainder of the front revealed little about enemy dispositions, but the composite of reports from air observers, agents, civilians, and prisoners made clear by 13 May that major PVA forces had begun to shift eastward from the west and west central sectors. Steady rain and fog all but eliminated further air observation on 14 and 15 May; poor visibility also hampered ground patrols; and a IX Corps reconnaissance-in-force by the 187th RCT up the valley northeast of Kap'yong toward what was believed to be a large concentration of enemy forces had to be canceled shortly after it started on the 15th because of the rain and poor road conditions. As much as could be determined by 16 May was that the eastward shift probably extended to the Chuncheon area.

A few reports tracing the shift indicated that some PVA units would move beyond Chuncheon. According to a PVA medical officer captured northeast of Seoul on 10 May, the 12th Army and two other armies were scheduled to leave the west central area late on 10 May, march east for four days, then attack the 2nd Division and the ROK divisions on the eastern front. Another captive taken on 13 May in the same general area said that the 15th Army was to march east for three days and attack the 2nd Division in conjunction with KPA attacks on the ROK front. Large enemy groups reported by X Corps observers to be moving east as far as Yanggu on 11 and 12 May were believed to be PVA, and a deserter from the engineer battalion of the 80th Division, 27th Army, picked up on 13 May in the Chuncheon area stated that his battalion had been bridging the Bukhan. The X Corps Intelligence Officer believed it most likely, however, that the forces moving east of the Bukhan as far as Yanggu were from the 39th or 40th Armies, both of which had been in the east central sector for some time. In any event, he considered major PVA operations on the eastern front to be impracticable. Given the logistical difficulties the PVA experienced in supporting offensive operations even in the Seoul area, where the distance to their rear supply bases was shortest and where the roads were more numerous and in better condition than anywhere else, he doubted that they would commit a large force in the eastern mountains where a supply line could not be maintained and where living off the land would be almost impossible. The Eighth Army intelligence staff as of 16 May had no corroborating evidence of the reported movement east of the Bukhan and even had some doubt that the PVA shift extended as far east as Chuncheon.

According to the consensus of current estimates of enemy dispositions as of 16 May, KPA I Corps on the west had spread forces eastward toward Route 33, taking over ground previously occupied by the PVA XIX Army Group. The PVA 65th Army astride Route 33 north of Uijongbu and the 63rd Army in the adjacent ground to the east formed the new front of the XIX Army Group. Reports placed the 64th Army northwest of the 65th. West to east, the 60th, 15th and 12th Armies were believed to occupy the new front of the PVA III Army Group from a point above the Bukhan River in the vicinity of Kap'yong eastward almost to Chuncheon. More tentatively located, the 20th and 27th Armies of the PVA IX Army Group were reported to be off the front in the area north of Chuncheon and the group's 26th Army possibly in the same vicinity. The PVA XIII Army Group apparently was still on the east central front, its 40th Army astride Route 17 just above Chuncheon and the 39th Army next to the east with its bulk between the Hwacheon Reservoir and the Soyang River and light forces occupying a bridgehead below the Soyang between Chuncheon and the river town of Naep'yong-ni some 10 miles (16 km) upstream to the northeast. On the basis of these dispositions, Van Fleet continued to believe that the main PVA effort would come in the west-central sector, probably toward the Han River corridor, and would be made by five armies, the 60th, 15th, 12th, 27th and 20th. He also anticipated strong attacks toward Seoul over Route 1 and through the Uijongbu corridor as well as another on the Chuncheon-Hongch'on axis.

The actual extent of the PVA shift from the west had been indicated by the few reports of planned and ongoing movements beyond the Bukhan. By 16 May PVA commander Peng Dehuai had moved five armies into the area along the Soyang River between Chuncheon and Inje behind screening forces of the 39th Army and the KPA III Corps. The 60th and 15th Armies of the III Army Group were in the area between Chuncheon and Naep'yong-ni. At and immediately beyond Naep'yong-ni was the 12th Army, now attached to the IX Army Group. Farthest east, the 27th and 20th Armies of the IX Army Group were clustered in the vicinity of Kwandae-ri just west of Inje.

Peng planned to launch his main attack on a southeastward course below the Naep'yongni-Kwandae-ri stretch of the Soyang. His reason for shifting the main effort into the higher Taebaek Mountains despite the portended logistical problems may have been because the rugged ridges and sparse road net would reduce to some degree the UN Command's advantage of superior mobility, firepower and airpower.

As revealed by the prisoners taken on 10 and 13 May, the objective of the main effort, to be launched during the evening of 16 May by the 15th, 12th and 27th Armies, was to sever the six ROK divisions on the eastern front from the remainder of the Eighth Army, to annihilate them, and to destroy the 2nd Division. In support of the main effort, KPA V Corps was to attack out of the Inje area in the ROK III Corps sector, and KPA II Corps, which had moved down from Hoeyang where it had been refurbishing since late March, was to attack along the east coast and atop the Taebaeks against ROK I Corps. On the west flank of the main attack, the 60th Army, less its 181st Division, which had been attached to the 12th Army to reinforce the main effort, was to conduct a holding attack against the 1st Marine Division. The XIX Army Group, now stretched out from the Kap'yong area west to Route 33 above Uijongbu, and KPA I Corps, astride Route 1, were to make similar attacks in the IX Corps and I Corps sectors.

== Battle ==
On 16 May after crossing the Soyang River northwest of Kwandae-ri with its 81st Division in the lead, the 27th Army opened the attack against the ROK 5th and 7th Divisions with hard blows centered at the seam between the two divisions that almost immediately began to dislodge the line regiments. X Corps' commander General Edward Almond authorized the two divisions to withdraw to the No Name Line around midnight. There followed a familiar story of infantry units scattered by PVA attacks while they were attempting to disengage, broken communications, loss of control, a search for missing troops and the reorganization of those that could be found. Reordered forces of the ROK 5th Division were sent out in echelon to the southeast along the 2nd Division's right flank. By midday on 17 May the only infantry units of the ROK 7th Division that had been located were two battalions of the reserve 3rd Regiment which were in position and engaged 6 miles (9.7 km) behind the No Name Line near the village of Sangam-ni (37.875°N 128.257°E) on the primitive road whose stretch northeast to Hyon-ni (37.943°N 128.316°E) and then northwest to Inje was the single route serving the ROK III Corps sector. Engaging the 3rd Regiment were forces of the 81st Division, whose main body had cut southeast through the ground abandoned by the ROK 7th Division to block the road just above Sangam-ni.

The 30th Field Artillery Battalion of the ROK 9th Division encountered the roadblock while withdrawing as a result of orders from ROK forward headquarters calling the ROK III and I Corps back to the No Name Line. Though the two corps had held up well under attacks by the KPA 6th and 12th Divisions of the KPA V Corps and the KPA 27th and 2nd Divisions of the KPA II Corps, Almond's authorization of the ROK 5th and 7th Divisions to retire to the No Name Line had led the ROK headquarters to follow suit on the morning of 17 May. As the two ROK III Corps divisions drew back to No Name positions centered above Hyon-ni, staying scarcely a step ahead of pursuing KPA forces, their artillery battalions (the 30th followed in column by the 11th of the ROK 3rd Division) moved below Hyon-ni toward Sangam-ni. The PVA blocking force waited until the 30th Battalion filled a narrow stretch of road twisting through a steep-sided defile in the heart of its position, then blanketed the artillerymen with fire. In the scramble out of the trap, only the tail-end battery saved its guns and vehicles. By evening the 11th Battalion and the crippled 30th Battalion returned north to firing positions in the Hyon-ni area. ROK III Corps' commander General Yu Jae-hung meanwhile sent the Corps' reserve, a regiment of the ROK 9th Division, south from Hyon-ni to deal with the block, but its efforts were futile against the stronger PVA force. With the west flank left open by the collapse of the ROK 7th Division, the ROK III Corps was in danger of being enveloped, or, with the PVA 81st Division continuing to block the road to the rear and the KPA 6th and 12th Divisions still pushing in from the north, of being caught in a squeeze.

With the right flank of the 2nd Division no more than sketchily protected by ROK 5th Division units, General Clark L. Ruffner's forces also faced the prospect of being enveloped. As in the Battle of the Ch'ongch'on River in late November, the division was again to be threatened from the east after ROK forces gave way while it contended with strong PVA attacks from the north. Ruffner had manned the left and center of the division's 15 miles (24 km) sector south of Naep'yong-ni with the 9th and 38th Infantry Regiments and had reconstituted Task Force Zebra, the tank-infantry group that had performed well in late April, to occupy the line at the right. The French Battalion, the only division reserve, was at Han'gye (37.806°N 127.991°E) on Route 24, about 5 miles (8.0 km) behind the Zebra line, deliberately set there by Ruffner to reinforce quickly the somewhat thin task force position.

=== 38th Infantry and Task Force Zebra ===
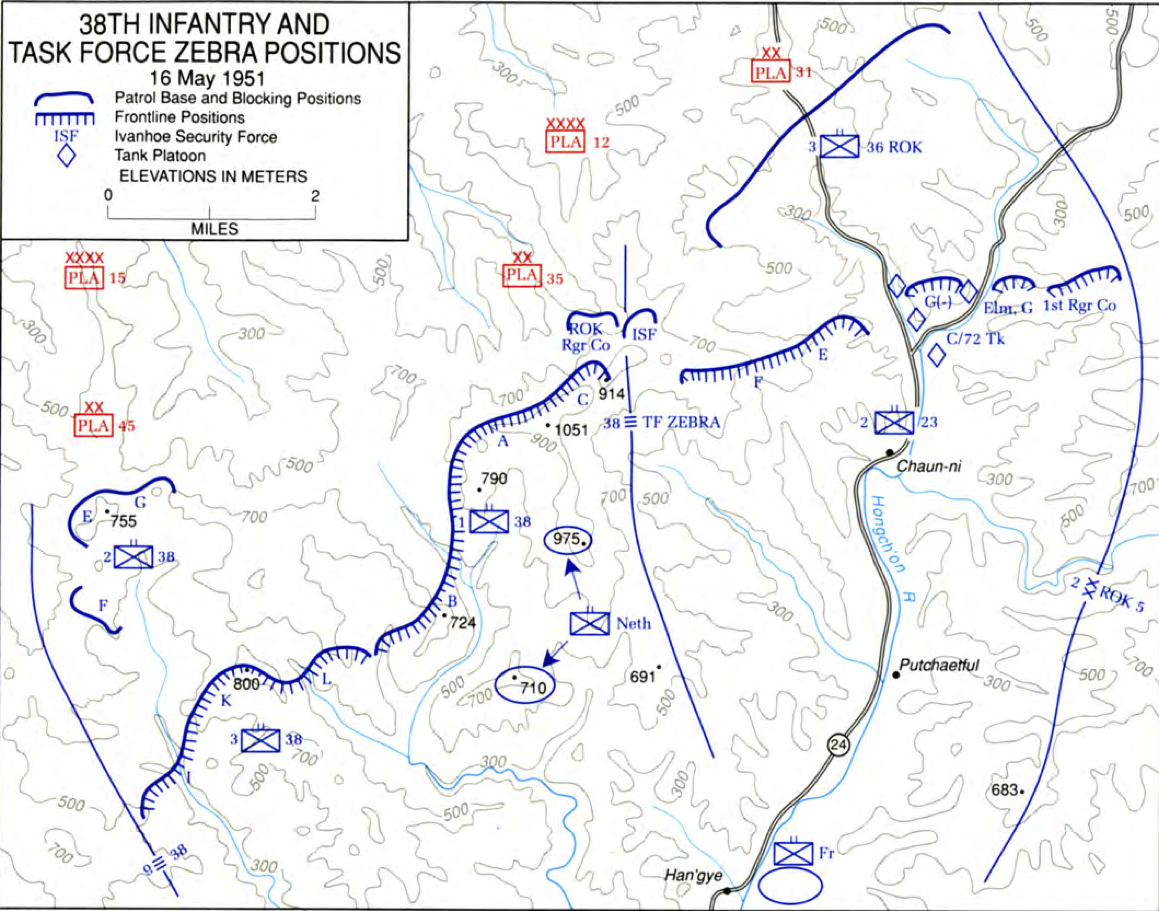
38th Infantry and Task Force Zebra positions, 16 May 1951

Under earlier orders to send daily patrols to the Soyang in the area immediately east of Chuncheon, the 9th Infantry had deployed one battalion on the No Name Line and two in patrol bases. On the highest ground in the division sector, two battalions of the 38th Infantry occupied a string of prominent heights along the No Name Line, the 3rd at the left, the 1st at the right. 2 miles (3.2 km) out on the west, the 2nd Battalion manned a patrol base that blocked ridgeline and valley approaches to the 3rd Battalion's position. Above the right flank of the 1st Battalion, a provisional company of ROK Rangers held a blocking position on a ridge offering enemy forces a good approach down the boundary between the 38th Infantry and Task Force Zebra. Colonel Coughlin, commander of the 38th, had set the attached Netherlands Battalion on Hills 710 and 975 behind the 1st Battalion with instructions to be prepared to counterattack anywhere in the 1st's sector.

Task Force Zebra, led by Lt. Col. Elbridge Brubaker, commander of the 72nd Tank Battalion, now included all but one company of the tank battalion; the 2nd Battalion, 23rd Infantry Regiment; the 1st Ranger Company; the Ivanhoe Security Force (a provisional company of ROK troops originally organized for division rear area security missions); and the ROK 3rd Battalion, 36th Regiment, attached from the ROK 5th Division. The ROK battalion occupied a patrol base along the trace of Line Missouri and the Ivanhoe Security Force a forward blocking position adjacent to the 38th Infantry's ROK Rangers on the west flank. On the No Name Line, the 2nd Battalion, 23rd Infantry, Company C of the tank battalion and the Ranger Company stood along both Route 24 angling in from the northeast through the Hongch'on River valley and a minor road running down a valley from the northwest and joining Route 24 just behind the task force position. West to east on ridges commanding the two roads were Companies F, E and G and the Rangers. The tanks stood behind barricades of wire and minefields blocking both valleys, though not the roads, which had been left free of obstacles to allow patrols to pass through. Company B of the tank battalion, in reserve, and the trains and command post of the 2nd Battalion, 23rd Infantry, were at the valley village of Chaun-ni (37.867°N 128.018°E), on Route 24 2 miles (3.2 km) behind the lines. Brubaker's command post was farther down Route 24 at the village of Putchaetful (37.838°N 128.017°E).

Daylight probes of the Zebra patrol base and sharp patrol skirmishes close to the lines of the 38th Infantry were forerunners of attacks by one division of the PVA 15th Army and two divisions of the 12th. In the 12th Army's attack, launched about dusk, the press of 35th Division forces along the 38th Infantry - Task Force Zebra boundary forced the Ivanhoe Security Force and adjacent company of ROK Rangers back against Company F, 23rd Infantry, before defensive fires smothered the assault. On the 12th's east wing, the 92nd Regiment, 31st Division, attacking the Zebra patrol base expelled and disorganized the ROK 3rd Battalion, 36th Regiment. ROK soldiers streamed through the main Zebra line until midnight, most of them down the northwest valley defended by the 3rd Platoon of Company C, 72nd Tank Battalion. French troops at Han'gye collected the disordered groups as they continued down Route 24 and assembled them for reorganization and screening for enemy infiltration.

Shortly after midnight, 50 or 60 PVA leading a column of the 92nd Regiment in pursuit of the ROK charged through the opening in the northernmost of two wire aprons strung across the valley. Forced off the road by fire from the tankers, the PVA deployed to the left and right, exploding mines and setting off trip flares. The larger body of PVA to the rear deployed under the light of the flares, and successive lines of skirmishers attempted to break the wire and reach the tanks. The 3rd Platoon, reinforced by the 2nd Platoon, defended against the PVA attacks while artillery fire walked up the valley above the wire. The PVA gave up the effort shortly before dawn, with the PVA dead of about 450.

Concentrating on Company E on Hill 755 at the center of the patrol base, a force from the PVA 45th Division, 15th Army, though delayed and hurt while breaching minefields and wire entanglements, drove off the company with the second wave of its assault. About 02:30, as the attack spread to Company F on the left flank of the split position, Coughlin ordered the patrol base force to withdraw behind the 3rd Battalion. Apparently spent by the effort to take Hill 755 and subject to covering artillery fire, the PVA made no immediate attempt to follow the withdrawal.

At the right of the 1st Battalion, platoons of Companies A and C occupying Hills 1051 (37.871°N 127.956°E) and 914 (37.881°N 127.972°E) and a saddle between turned back a series of attacks opened at dusk by small units of the 35th Division in concert with the assaults that drove back the two provisional ROK companies along the 38th Infantry-Task Force Zebra boundary. But following these apparent tests of the defenses, a full attack by the division's 103rd Regiment about 02:00 forced Company A forces out of the saddle, opening the way for a sweep behind the 1st Battalion or for a deep penetration down a valley leading southeast to Route 24 at Putchaetful, well behind the positions of Task Force Zebra. Coughlin kept the gap under mortar and artillery fire for the rest of the night and ordered the Netherlands Battalion to send a company north from Hill 975 at first light to close it. Ruffner directed the French Battalion to send a company up the valley from Putchaetful to remove any PVA who penetrated through the mortar and artillery barrages.

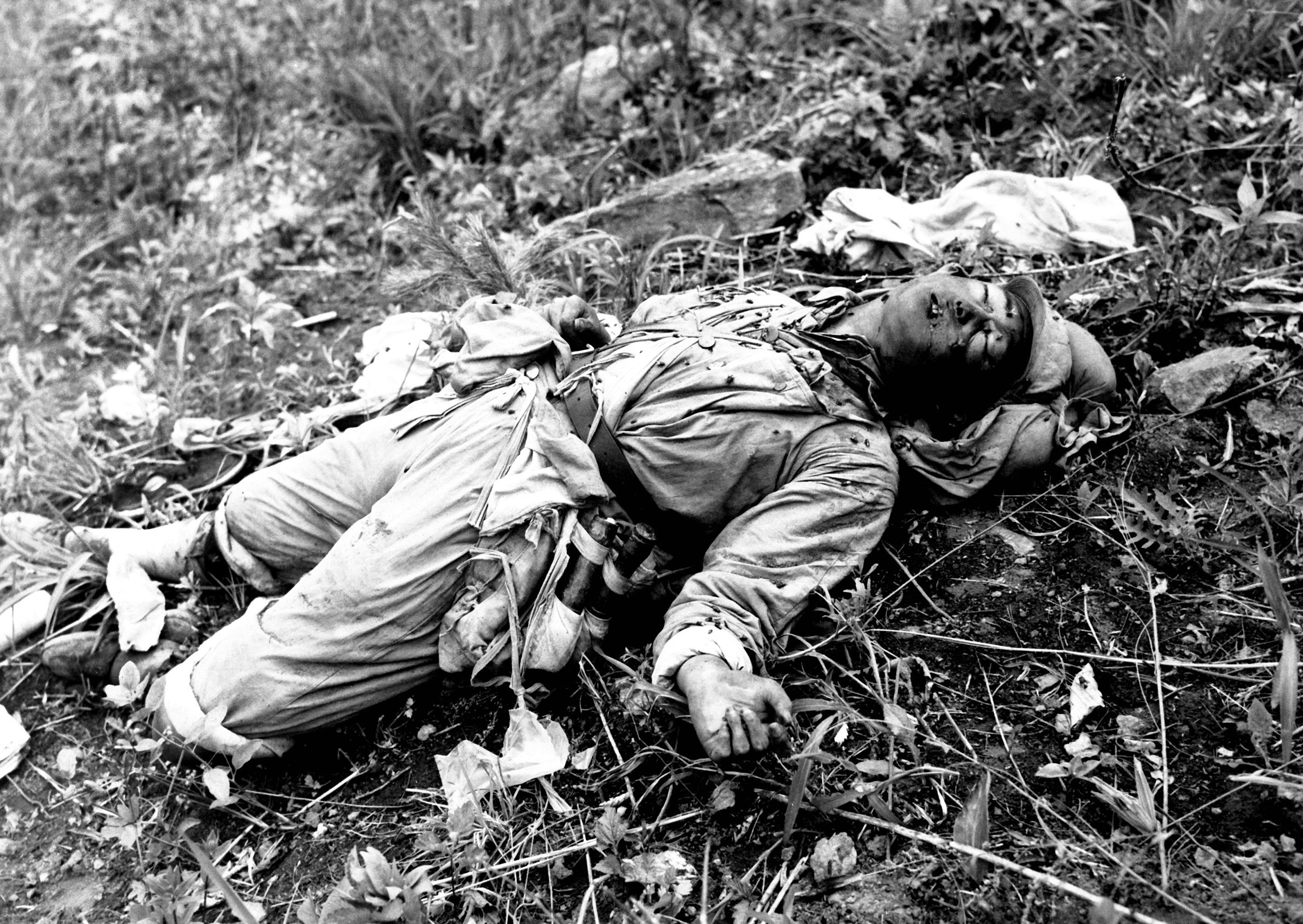
PVA soldier killed on Hill 1051

Moving from Hill 975 toward Hill 1051 on the near side of the saddle, the Dutch company lacked the numbers to push through PVA who by daylight closed in around a platoon of Company A on the 1051 crest. The remainder of the Netherlands Battalion, under Coughlin's order, joined its forward company about 09:30, but, finding that Hill 1051 had fallen to the PVA, the Dutch commander, Lieutenant colonel William Eekhout, held up his advance while he targeted the height and the saddle beyond with artillery fire. French troops meanwhile advancing up the valley northwest of Putchaetful engaged enemy forces less than 2 miles (3.2 km) above Route 24. An estimated 500 PVA had worked their way into the valley. A Chinese-speaking radioman with the Netherlands Battalion at midmorning intercepted a PVA order to "send all troops east of Hill 1051." That neither sender nor recipient of the order was identifiable made estimating the strength of the forces involved impossible, but the PVA obviously planned to exploit the breakthrough. Expecting that the Dutch attack to close the gap would start shortly, Ruffner ordered the French to assist by reinforcing the drive up the valley; he urged speed so that the gap would be eliminated before the PVA could exploit the opening.

Before the Dutch and French were able to move, thousands of PVA, according to 38th Infantry estimates, were passing through the gap by 11:00. Groups moving along the far edge of the saddle widened the opening by forcing a platoon of Company C off Hill 914. PVA killed or wounded by artillery fire on the saddle and the area below it marked the paths of the larger number veering east toward the front of Task Force Zebra and of the remainder heading down the valley toward the French. Viewing this scene from the vicinity of Hill 1051, Eekhout continued to hold up the Dutch attack.

After the opening PVA attacks and ROK withdrawals had exposed the division's east flank and bared the Task Force Zebra front, Ruffner had asked Almond to return the remainder of the 23rd Infantry Regiment from Corps' reserve for use in thickening the Zebra position. Almond released the regiment about 11:30 after the PVA strength on the Zebra front began to build. Taking command of the front, including all Zebra forces and the French Battalion, at 14:30, Colonel Chiles concentrated the 2nd Battalion in the left half of the sector, put in the 3rd Battalion on the right, and placed the 1st Battalion in reserve just above Han'gye. Except for exchanging fire with Company F on the left flank, the PVA moving onto the front were inactive throughout the afternoon, but their number continued to grow as the Netherlands Battalion, though Coughlin on orders from Ruffner instructed it to attack at 13:00, failed to advance. Ruffner sensed from the Dutch failure to move that Coughlin "was looking half way over the shoulder" instead of concentrating on the essential task of closing the gap. Ruffner again ordered the Dutch to attack, this time at 15:00, and started forward by helicopter to direct the attempt himself, but his craft crashed on a hilltop near the 1st Battalion command post. Neither Ruffner nor his pilot was seriously injured, but Ruffner was stranded well beyond the time set for opening the attack. Hiking to the battalion command post to meet a rescue helicopter sent out by the division surgeon, he returned to his headquarters after receiving assurances that the Dutch had jumped off on time. There he learned that PVA on and around Hill 1051 had stymied the Dutch and that PVA on the far side of the gap had pushed Company C completely out of position and forced its remnants back to the position of Company F, 23rd Infantry. Ruffner now considered two courses open to him, to commit greater strength against the PVA penetration or to set troops along its southwest shoulder, a move which, with the French Battalion blocking the valley in the 23rd Infantry sector, would, if somewhat thinly, seal off the penetration. He opted for the second course. By evening he had the Netherlands Battalion on the way to occupy Hill 975 (37.856°N 127.962°E) and thus extend the right flank of Company A, 38th Infantry, now on Hill 790 (37.861°N 127.943°E) about a mile below Hill 1051, and had the 2nd Battalion of the 38th moving up to defend a ridge curving southeast of Hill 975 to Hill 691.

=== Reinforcing and realigning X Corps ===
In search of reserves to back up his hard-pressed central forces, Ruffner at mid-morning had asked Almond's permission to pull the two patrol base battalions of the 9th Infantry out of the left sector, which was obviously outside the zone of the PVA's main attack. Almond instructed him to plan the move but deferred a final decision until he could determine how the removal of the two battalions would affect the dispositions of the 1st Marine Division. Almond raised the matter with Van Fleet during the afternoon while apprising him of the Corps' situation and requesting reinforcement. Given the course of PVA attacks and the enemy units so far identified, Almond believed that Peng was attempting to turn the right flank of X Corps with the 27th Army, would wait until the 27th seriously threatened the flank, then would make his main effort down the Chuncheon-Hongch'on axis with the III Army Group. Prisoners taken during a local but stiff four-hour nighttime attack on a battalion of the US 7th Marine Regiment occupying a forward blocking position on Route 29 had identified the 180th Division of the 60th Army, indicating that the full III Army Group was in position for an attack such as Almond anticipated. Almond doubted that X Corps could hold against this PVA move unless the Corps' hard-hit center and tattered right were strengthened. In immediate reinforcement he asked for a regimental combat team to help stabilize his right flank and for one heavy and two medium artillery battalions to increase long range fire on enemy concentration areas.

To enable the 2nd Division to place more of its strength in the threatened areas, Van Fleet moved the IX Corps-X Corps boundary 4 miles (6.4 km) east. In the resulting shift of units, the 7th Division on the IX Corps' right was to take over part of the 1st Marine Division's sector, and Marines were to relieve the 9th and 38th Regiments, freeing them for employment farther east. Van Fleet also ordered ROK III and I Corps back to Line Waco, which he had delineated in his withdrawal plan of 28 April, some 12 miles (19 km) to 18 miles (29 km) south of the No Name Line. Allowing ROK III Corps no option, he ordered Yu to eliminate the enemy roadblock at Sangam-ni so that all vehicles and weapons could be evacuated. On X Corps' right, Almond was to organize positions angling southeast to a juncture with ROK III Corps on Line Waco above the village of Habaejae (37.749°N 128.307°E).

Reinforcements ordered to the X Corps' sector by Van Fleet included the ROK 8th Division, which was to move north, initially to Chech'on, as soon as security battalions and National Police could take over its anti-guerrilla mission in southern Korea. An earlier arrival would be the 3rd Division less its 7th and 65th Regimental Combat Teams. Geared for a move to the X Corps' sector since 11 May, the leading battalion of the 15th Regimental Combat Team made the 70 miles (110 km) trip from its assembly area southeast of Seoul to Hoengsong by midmorning on 17 May. The remainder of the force, which included the division's medium artillery battalion, completed the move early on 18 May. Also sent east by Van Fleet were a battery of 155-mm. guns and a battery of 8-inch howitzers, both taken from IX Corps. These additions gave Almond a total of five battalions and four batteries of medium and heavy artillery.

In shifting Marines east into the 2nd Division's sector, Almond initially ordered the relief of the 9th Infantry by midday on 18 May. Maj. Gen. Gerald C. Thomas, the new commander of the 1st Marine Division, made the move by pulling the 7th Marines back from their forward patrol base and blocking positions to relieve the 1st Marine Regiment on the No Name Line at the division's right, then by sidestepping the 1st Marines onto the 9th Infantry's front. The 5th Marine Regiment, on the division's left flank, later were to swing roundabout into the 38th Infantry's sector after being replaced by forces of the 7th Division.

Late on 17 May Almond authorized both divisional and Corps' artillery units to quintuple their ammunition expenditure (the Van Fleet day of fire) and directed them to concentrate fire on likely avenues of enemy approach within 3,000 yards (2,700 m) of defensive positions. Ammunition expenditure would increase dramatically, reaching 41,350 rounds and 1,187 tons on 18 May and even higher amounts afterward. As had been predicted by the Eighth Army supply officer, sufficient ammunition to support the heavy expenditure was maintained at the army supply point serving X Corps, but not without difficulty. The supply point stocks of two days of fire at the Van Fleet rate dwindled to one and could not be raised above that amount. The high consumption also strained Corps' and unit transportation in hauling ammunition from the army supply point at Wonju to the base corps dump at Hongch'on, a round trip of over 60 miles (97 km), and from Hongch'on to artillery units.

The use of MPQ radars to direct bombers in close support missions at night, a technique employed only sparingly until April, also reached a peak, particularly in guiding B-29 sorties. On 17 May Far East Air Forces commander General George E. Stratemeyer directed that no fewer than 12 of the medium bombers be committed to the nightly support. Typical of one night's effort was a drop of 350 500-pound proximity-fused general-purpose bombs on 20 targets selected by X Corps' headquarters, all of them enemy troop concentrations, some within 400 yards (370 m) of the front. Casualty estimates by follow-up patrols and the statements of captives attested to the precision of the radar guided attacks.

In the 2nd Division sector, the main nighttime targets of air and artillery attack-most observed in their approach well before dark on 17 May were fresh PVA columns coming in on the positions of the 38th Infantry, passing through the gap, and moving east across the front of the 23rd Infantry. Crowding the front of the 3rd Battalion, 38th Infantry, forces of the 135th Regiment, 45th Division, broke the wire and penetrated the line, but with losses too high to be able to withstand counterattacks. Sweeps to clear rear areas and a final counterattack to drive out PVA who had occupied some of the bunkers restored the battalion's position early on 18 May.

To the east, the course of battle verged on the calamitous and chaotic for PVA and 2nd Division forces alike. From late afternoon traffic on the artillery net, Coughlin estimated the strength of the new influx of PVA forces in the gap area to be 3,000. Early evening reports from the Netherlands Battalion on Hill 975 tended higher. The Dutch reported PVA in waves of 1,000 each crossing the saddle between Hills 1051 and 914 and walking upright through the artillery bombardment rather than in the crouch that soldiers tend to assume when moving under heavy fire. On the receiving end of the PVA stream, the 23rd Infantry commander, Colonel Chiles, reported to Ruffner that bombing attacks and artillery barrages rolling up the valley were causing large amounts of PVA casualties.

Coming through the valley was the PVA 181st Division. Its leading units had the French Battalion under attack by dark. Sharply hit from the front and flanked on the left after two hours under assault, the French withdrew 1 mile (1.6 km) south to hills edging Route 24 just above Putchaetful. The battalion gained respite from attack for the remainder of the night, but its withdrawal opened the left flank of the 23rd Infantry and gave the PVA free access to Route 24 between Putchaetful and Chaun-ni. Small PVA groups infiltrating Chaun-ni about 03:30 harassed the command posts of the 2nd and 3rd Battalions, 23rd Infantry and Company C, 72nd Tank Battalion, and blew up a loaded ammunition truck before pulling back into the high ground west of the village. Meanwhile, the bulk of the division filled the hills bordering Route 24 on the west between Chaun-ni and the French Battalion. Forces on the south reengaged the French while detachments slipping out of the hills about daylight mined the road 0.5 miles (0.80 km) below Chaun-ni and at a second point farther south within view of the French.

Along the front of the 23rd Infantry, the PVA attacked Company F on the left flank with fire and assault until about midnight, then broke contact and moved east. The reach of an apparent general PVA movement east and then south had been indicated earlier when the ROK 5th Division units echeloned along the right flank of the 23rd reported heavy pressure and, with Almond's approval, withdrew behind a lateral stretch of the Hongch'on River almost due east of Chaun-ni. Leading the southeastward swing was the 31st Division, sliding east onto the front of the 23rd Infantry was the 35th Division, and approaching from the northwest to join the move was the 34th Division, which, when inserted between the 31st and 35th Divisions on 18 May, would fully commit the PVA 12th Army. The 4th Platoon, Company C, 72nd Tank Battalion, moved out to the immediate right rear of the 3rd Battalion following the ROK withdrawal, but a wide expanse of ground along the right of the regiment remained open. With an uncovered flank inviting envelopment by the PVA forces sweeping it on the east and its withdrawal route blocked by the 181st Division, the 23rd Infantry by daylight on 18 May was in a situation similar to that of ROK III Corps.

The situation in the sectors of the 1st and 2nd Battalions, 38th Infantry, by morning of 18 May was equally critical. Between these two battalions, the position of the Netherlands Battalion on Hill 975 had crumbled of its own accord early the previous evening when most of the Dutch troops, after witnessing the flow of PVA through the gap, streamed off the height. "They have seen so many Chinamen and [so much] firing today," Coughlin explained to Ruffner, and they "think that if our air and artillery can't stop them then there's not much they can do." Though their commander, Eekhout, regained control quickly, Coughlin, at Ruffner's instruction, sent the battalion into an assembly near Hang'ye for rest and reorganization and stretched out the forces of Company A and F to man the vacated position.

Repair of the line at Hill 975 was still under way when 44th Division forces broke it farther west at the juncture of Companies B and A. PVA coming through lapped around Company B on Hill 724 and piled up on Hill 710 (37.836°N 127.952°E) behind Companies A and F. Company E, sent west from the Hill 975-Hill 691 ridge by Coughlin to plug the new gap, bogged down in encounters at Hill 710, while PVA moving south off 710 surrounded and attacked the command posts of the 1st and 2nd Battalions collocated at the foot of the height and blocked the regimental supply road 1 mile (1.6 km) farther south. In what turned out to be an overreaction to the deeper PVA incursion, Coughlin ordered back both Company E from Hill 710 and Company G from the 975-691 ridge and sent a platoon of his tank company and a detachment of Dutch troops up the supply road to clear the command post area. With little help needed from the rifle companies, the tank-infantry team eliminated the PVA roadblock and opened a way out for the beleaguered command post group by morning of the 18th.

None of the three forward companies was under heavy pressure at daylight, but Company B remained surrounded, and Companies A and F were isolated by the PVA behind them. To the east, the 23rd Infantry was strained by heavy morning attacks, especially Company F on the left flank and Company I on the right. As the attacks began to lash the 23rd, Ruffner convinced Almond that the 23rd and the adjoining three companies of the 38th had to withdraw immediately if they were to withdraw in good order. Almond instructed Ruffner to establish a line running from the still solid position of Coughlin's 3rd Battalion in the Hill 800 complex southeast through Han'gye to Hill 693 6 miles (9.7 km) beyond Route 24. To meet Van Fleet's earlier order that X Corps tie in with ROK III Corps on Line Waco, Almond extended the line another 13 miles (21 km) to the vicinity of Habaejae; along the extension he planned initially to set up blocking positions using available units of the ROK 5th, 3rd and 7th Divisions.

In earlier moves to deepen the defense in the 38th Infantry sector, Ruffner during the night had shifted the 3rd Battalion, 9th Infantry Regiment, east to positions behind Coughlin's 3rd Battalion and shortly before daylight had ordered the 2nd Battalion, 9th Infantry to move roundabout and come up on the right in the ground just west of Han'gye. Upon relief by the 1st Marines around midday the 9th's remaining battalion was now to insert itself between the 3rd and 2nd as the regiment developed defenses along the divisions modified line between Hill 800 and Route 24. During the shift of battalions, which would continue well into the afternoon, the 3rd Battalion and later the 2nd were to send forces forward to break the ring of PVA around Company B, 38th Infantry and clear Hill 710 behind Companies A and F to assist their withdrawal. Once the three companies were back, the 38th Infantry, less its 3rd Battalion, was to become division reserve.

For the 23rd Infantry, assigned to occupy the new line east of Route 24, the major problem in getting back to the line was the road block below Chaun-ni. Threatened in particular by the block were the convoys of the 2nd and 3rd Battalions, Company C, 72nd Tank Battalion, and two platoons of the heavy mortar company, all located in and around Chaun-ni with no alternative withdrawal route for wheeled vehicles. To clear the road for the trains, Chiles organized a two-pronged attack, the 3rd Battalion to make sure that the east side of the road was clear, the 2nd Battalion to take on the task of forcing back the PVA occupying the heights bordering the road on the west. Company C, 72nd Tank Battalion was to bring up the rear, fending off the PVA still pressing the line if they attempted to follow the disengagement. Two platoons of tanks from Company B, 72nd Tank Battalion were to assist the attack of the 2nd Battalion from firing positions in the river bottom east of the road opposite the PVA blocking position.

The PVA let the 3rd Battalion go when it disengaged, but heavy tank fire, time on target artillery fire and air strikes were needed to keep PVA forces off the tail of the 2nd Battalion as it peeled off the line in a column of companies. Reaching the Chaun-ni area by early afternoon, the 3rd Battalion occupied hills opposite the roadblock while the 2nd Battalion attempted to push the PVA away from the road. With the PVA holding the advantage of superior numbers on commanding ground, after an hour Chiles realized that his forces could not clear the PVA position. The danger of being rolled up from the north meanwhile was growing as PVA coming into the area vacated by the 3rd Battalion joined the attempt to follow the rearward move. Electing a faster, if riskier, course, Chiles ordered the trains to run by the roadblock with two platoons of tanks from Company C as escort. The 2nd Battalion in the meantime was to cross the road at Chaun-ni and withdraw with the 3rd.

During the morning the intelligence officer of the 72nd Tank Battalion at Putchaetful had received a French report that PVA had mined the road, and he had relayed the report to an enlisted man at the command post of the 2nd Battalion, 23rd Infantry at Chaun-ni. At that point the information had somehow gone astray. A costly consequence of the communications lapse came when the convoy of wheeled vehicles interspersed among tanks traveling in fourth gear attempted its run. A mine in a field planted 0.5 miles (0.80 km) below Chaun-ni disabled the lead tank, trucks piled up behind, and PVA fire from the hills and draws to the west chased drivers and tank crews as they dropped down a 20-foot (6.1 m) embankment off the east shoulder of the road and splashed across the Hongch'on River to reach cover behind the tanks of Company B in the stream bed. The second tank in column shoved the abandoned trucks off the road and safely bypassed the knocked-out tank, but lost a track in the minefield near the French position. Observing both explosions from Chaun-ni, a staff officer of the 2nd Battalion ordered the remainder of the convoy to move east off the road just below the village and follow the stream bed south. The tanks churned in behind those of Company B, but under small arms, machine gun, and mortar fire ranging in from the west, panicky truck drivers drove helter-skelter into the hills beyond the stream bed. Some vehicles caught fire; ammunition trucks exploded; others eventually were halted by one or another accident of terrain, drivers and riders joined the withdrawal of the 2nd and 3rd Battalions. Stragglers and abandoned communications equipment, weapons, and personal gear dotted the track of the two battalions as they made a tiring march under flanking fire from the west for part of the way and under drenching rainstorms that broke about 18:30. By midnight both units were behind the 1st Battalion, which during the afternoon had occupied the first ridge east of Route 24 on the new defense line. The 3rd Battalion filled lower ground between the ridge and the road while the 2nd Battalion and the French battalion, which had disengaged from the PVA roadblock force as the two battalions east of the road had come abreast, assembled to the rear for the remainder of the night.

As the two remaining tank platoons of Company C brought up the rear of the withdrawal they were ordered by the company commander to leave the road at Chaun-ni and follow the stream bed south, as Company B already had done, one platoon missed the turnoff point and came upon the disabled tank 0.5 miles (0.80 km) below town. Unable to turn around in the narrow road space between the embankment on the east and steep slopes on the west and faced with the danger of mines to the south, the tankers chose the nearly vertical 20 feet (6.1 m) drop on their left. Two tanks snapped drive shafts in the plunge. The two immobilized tanks raised Company C's tank losses since 16 May to five. The trains of Company C, the 2nd and 3rd Battalions, and half the heavy mortar company, more than 150 vehicles, many with heavy weapons, ammunition, or other gear aboard, had been left behind and by dark were being picked over by the PVA. Casualties suffered by the 23rd Infantry and its attachments totaled 72 killed, 158 wounded and 190 missing. In return for these losses in men and equipment, the regiment exacted an estimated 2,228 killed and 1,400 wounded and took 22 prisoners from the PVA 31st, 35th and 181st Divisions.

West of Route 24, by late afternoon the 9th Infantry reinforced by the Netherlands Battalion and Company G of the 38th had occupied positions between Hill 800 and Route 24, but had not cleared a way through the PVA around Company B and behind Companies A and F. In a new plan for getting the three units out, Coughlin used a rolling artillery barrage, coupling it to an umbrella of circling aircraft. For ten minutes ahead of the withdrawal, set for 18:00, seven battalions of artillery, a mix of light, medium and heavy guns, were to fire across the front of the companies, then at 18:00 were to place concentrations on Hill 710 and to box in the three companies as they shifted east and withdrew down the 975-691 ridge. A liaison plane overhead was to control the delivery of air strikes and adjustment of the box as the companies moved and also was to relay all other communications. A sudden, severe thunderstorm breaking 20 minutes after the start of the withdrawal drove all planes back to their bases and thus not only eliminated air support, but also forced the artillery to stop firing the protective barrage and interrupted radio contact between Coughlin's headquarters and the withdrawing units. Small groups filtering through the lines of the 9th Infantry during the remainder of the night were an indication of the final disruption caused by the storm. Head counts on the morning of 19 May were two officers and 81 men for Company A, no officers and 74 men for Company B, and no officers and 81 men for Company F. Casualties had reduced the other companies of both the 1st and 2nd Battalions to similar figures. Officer losses in the 2nd Battalion were especially high, among them the battalion commander, battalion executive officer, battalion operations officer and two company commanders.

The X Corps' line shaped by the withdrawals and shifts on 18 May amounted to a deep salient with the 3rd Battalion, 38th Infantry, at its apex in the Hill 800 complex and the 1st Marine Division presenting a solid face toward Chuncheon on its northwest shoulder. Along its upper northeast shoulder, the 9th Infantry and 23rd Infantry carried the line from the Hill 800 mass beyond Han'gye to a point about3 miles (4.8 km) short of Hill 683 (37.82°N 128.041°E), which Almond had set as the eastern limit of the 2nd Division's new sector. Hill 683 had fallen to the PVA, however, when the ROK 5th Division forces that had taken position along the Hongch'on River east of Chaun-ni were driven back and disorganized during the day by the PVA 34th Division. Units regrouped by nightfall, a mix of three battalions of infantry from the 35th and 36th Regiments and a company of engineers, were clustered around the village of Hasolch'i (37.742°N 128.088°E) located on a lateral mountain track 2 miles (3.2 km) south of Hill 683. Pulling out of contact at the southern end of the PVA 81st Division's roadblock at Sangam-ni early in the day, the bulk of the 3rd Regiment engineer battalion and the tank destroyer company of the ROK 7th Division now defended the X Corps' east flank from positions just below the village of P'ungam-ni (37.714°N 128.184°E), 6 miles (9.7 km) southeast of Hasolch'i. Of the 7th Division's other forces, about 700 had been corralled far to the south in Chech'on; another group had been found at the village of Soksa-ri (37.638°N 128.495°E), located on Route 20 over 15 miles (24 km) southeast of P'ungam-ni in the ROK III Corps' sector.

ROK troops straggling into the area just north and east of Soksa-ri by nightfall attested to the misfortunes of the ROK 3rd and 9th Divisions when they had attempted to withdraw to Line Waco. In starting the move down the road from Hyon-ni, the ROK III Corps' commander, Yu, had ordered the 9th Division to take the lead and deal with the PVA roadblock at Sangam-ni while the 3rd Division, bringing up the rear, handled any KPA attempts to roll up the column from the north. By midmorning Yu's forces were caught in the predictable squeeze, the PVA 81st Division holding its Sangam-ni position against the 9th Division's efforts to reduce it while forces of the KPA 6th and 12th Divisions closed in on the 3rd Division in the Hyon-ni area. Both ROK divisions broke away in disorder into the heights east of the road, leaving behind all remaining artillery pieces and more than three hundred vehicles. Paths through the mountains channeled the disorganized troops southeast toward Soksa-ri. Out of radio contact with his forces since early morning, but informed of their southeasterly movement by air observers, Yu air-dropped to some groups orders assigning them to Line Waco positions. He also set up straggler lines in the Soksa-ri area, but by nightfall had regained control of forces in little more than battalion strength.

While Yu struggled to reorder his two divisions and deploy them on Line Waco, Almond ordered additional modifications of the X Corps' front to straighten and shorten the line and to shift 2nd Division forces farther east into the weakly defended sectors of the ROK 5th and 7th Divisions. The 5th Marines, now scheduled to take over the western portion of the 2nd Division's sector during the afternoon of 19 May, were to occupy positions centered some 3 miles (4.8 km) south of Hill 800 which would eliminate the bulge manned by the 3rd Battalion, 38th Infantry, in the Hill 800 mass and the two adjoining battalions of the 9th Infantry. Unaware that the 800 complex would be abandoned, the PVA 45th Division meanwhile suffered unnecessarily in nightlong attempts to take it. Successive assault waves of the fresh 133rd Regiment were shattered, mainly by heavy concentrations of artillery fire. On the crest of Hill 800, where the PVA centered most of their charges, the men of Company K, 38th Infantry, in fact did little fighting themselves but sat inside their bunkers and allowed the PVA to enter their lines, then called down artillery fire. The PVA pulled back about dawn on 19 May, leaving behind some 800 dead.

The new line of the 2nd Division, to be occupied on 19 May, cut Route 24 just below Han'gye on the west and reached across lateral ridges eastward, into what had become enemy territory, through Hill 683 to the village of Nuron-ni (37.764°N 128.164°E), 3 miles (4.8 km) above P'ungam-ni. Ruffner assigned the 23rd Infantry to the central sector centered on Hill 683. Given the 15th Regimental Combat Team of the 3rd Division by Almond as a replacement for the 38th Infantry's going into Corps' reserve, Ruffner ordered the 15th initially to occupy the P'ungam-ni area as a preliminary to moving forward to the Nuron-ni sector of the line. Both the 9th Infantry and the 15th Regimental Combat Team thus faced the prospect of having to fight to gain the line they were to defend, but, once the two regiments were on the line, the 2nd Division would hold good positions looking down into the valley of the Naech'on River, a westward flowing tributary of the Hongch'on.

To help strengthen the X Corps' eastern sector, Van Fleet at midnight on 18 May ordered the remainder of the 3rd Division eastward from the Seoul area, the 7th Regimental Combat Team to move on 19 May, the 65th Regimental Combat Team on 20 May. Almond directed the division, less its 15th Regimental Combat Team, which was to remain attached to the 2nd Division, to protect X Corps' east flank from enemy attacks out of the sector of the muddled ROK III Corps. 3rd Division commander General Robert H. Soule was initially to concentrate forces at Pangnimni, located on Route 20 15 miles (24 km) south of Soksa-ri, then reconnoiter and set up blocking positions in the Soksa-ri area.

From Hoengsong, where 3rd Division headquarters had set up on moving east with the 15th Regimental Combat Team, Soule moved a tactical command post group to the Pangnim-ni area early on 19 May and sent his reconnaissance company up Route 20 to patrol as far as Hajinbu-ri, 5 miles (8.0 km) east of Soksa-ri. The company found the road clear and made contact with ROK III Corps' troops in the Hajinbu-ri area. On its return run during the afternoon, the company left a platoon in Soksa-ri to watch a mountain road reaching the village from Sangam-ni and Habaejae to the northwest, then moved on to Changp'yong-ni (37.588°N 128.418°E), 6 miles (9.7 km) southwest of Soksa-ri. There the 3rd Battalion, 7th Infantry, first to arrive from the west, blocked Route 20 and mountain trails coming in from the northwest. Reaching the area after dark, the remainder of the 7th Infantry assembled at Ami-don, 5 miles (8.0 km) south of Changp'yong-ni.

At the right of the 2nd Division 15 miles (24 km) to the northwest, the 15th Regimental Combat Team attacked through the ROK 3rd Regiment at 11:00 to seize P'ungam-ni and high ground 1.5 miles (2.4 km) to the northwest along the trail leading to Nuron-ni on the modified No Name Line another 2 miles (3.2 km) to the north. Moving against light resistance, the combat team consolidated positions on its objective after dark. As the 15th moved beyond the village, the ROK 3rd Regiment and smaller units of the ROK 7th Division in the area advanced through light to moderate opposition to positions north and northeast of P'ungam-ni, the latter along a trail leading to Habaejae.

At the new left of the 2nd Division along Route 24, the PVA 181st Division wheeling out of its roadblock near Chaun-ni reengaged the 23rd Infantry just above Han'gye shortly before dawn and kept the 1st and 3rd Battalions pinned in position until counterattacks, artillery fire, and air strikes called in under gradually clearing skies finally forced a release about midday. The two battalions occupied positions straddling Route 24 on the new line below Han'gye by early evening. While the 2nd Battalion moved east to a centrally located reserve position along the lateral track leading to Hasolch'i, the attached French Battalion attempted to take position on the regimental right and make contact with a unit of the ROK 36th Regiment located northwest of Hasolch'i in the sector to be occupied by the 9th Infantry. But PVA stoutly defending an intervening height prevented the French from closing ranks with the ROK.

It was well after dark before the 9th Infantry completed its eastward shift into its new sector above Hasolch'i. First to arrive, the 1st Battalion moved up on the right of the ROK 35th Regiment into positions northeast of Hasolch'i looking down into the valley of a small stream that fed the Naech'on River. The 2nd Battalion took position behind the forces of the ROK 36th Regiment to await daylight before relieving the ROK and extending westward toward the French Battalion. With a similar objective, the 3rd Battalion assembled near Hasolch'i to await morning before moving up on the right of the 1st Battalion to close the gap between the 9th Infantry and the 15th Regimental Combat Team in the P'ungam-ni area.

The ROK III Corps' sector remained a scene of scattered forces throughout 19 May, troops trickling into collecting points along Route 20, some of both the 3rd and 9th Divisions taking up random positions about 5 miles (8.0 km) above the road. None, despite Yu's air-dropped orders the day before, stopped on Line Waco some 7 miles (11 km) farther north. There was an absence of enemy contact. In marked contrast, ROK I Corps all but completed an orderly withdrawal to Line Waco, both its divisions moving along the coast, the Capital in the lead and the 11th, though not in contact, prudently bounding south by regiment in bringing up the rear. Leading the way west along Line Waco, the 26th Regiment of the Capital Division refused the Corps' inland flank left open by ROK III Corps.

By nightfall on 19 May, the full PVA IX Army Group stood opposite X Corps' new eastern front between Han'gye and Soksa-ri. Though the group remained generally on a southeastward course, its attached 12th Army was turning more to the south on the front of the 2nd Division with four divisions abreast: the 181st already was in the Han'gye area; the 35th was approaching next to the east; the 34th was entering the area above Hasolch'i, where its leading forces had stopped the French Battalion at the right of the 23d Infantry; and the bulk of the 31st now was located above P'ungam-ni after being forced out of the village by the 15th Regimental Combat Team. Making a fast march to the southeast of P'ungam-ni, the 93rd Regiment, 31st Division was nearing Soksa-ri on Route 20. Using the mountain road running southeast from Sangam-ni through Habaejae to Soksa-ri as its axis, the 27th Army also was headed for the Soksa-ri area, advancing with its three divisions in column, the 81st still in the lead after helping to rout ROK III Corps, the 79th and 80th trailing in the vicinity of Habaejae. Behind the 27th Army, the 20th Army, in group reserve, was beginning to move southeast from the Kwandae-ri area along the Soyang River. Coming from the Hyon-ni area on a line of march projecting to Hajinbu-ri were the KPA 6th and 12th Divisions of V Corps and moving toward Hajinbu-ri on a parallel course just to the east were the KPA 2nd and 27th Divisions of II Corps, which, after failing in frontal attacks against ROK I Corps, had shifted west in an apparent attempt to envelop the ROK.

PVA/KPA action decidedly had slackened on the X Corps' front during the afternoon of 19 May after the 181st Division gave up its attack on the 23rd Infantry in the Han'gye area. But, with PVA continuing to mass ahead of the 2nd Division, the slack appeared to be mostly a result of attempts to move fresh units forward to take over the assault. Although the pell-mell withdrawal of ROK III Corps had taken its scrambled forces out of contact, the passage of PVA in strength southeastward through Habaejae and beyond presaged heavy action along Route 20. It seemed that enemy forces would not only quickly revive their drive against X and ROK III Corps but, with strong PVA reserves and KPA divisions on the move, that they would increase it.

=== The PVA overextend ===
On 18 May, after the PVA had reached P'ungam-ni, then the deepest point of penetration, and as the substantial sweep of PVA around the 2nd Division into the sectors of the collapsing ROK units had become apparent, UN Commander General Matthew Ridgway suggested that Van Fleet attempt to relieve the pressure on his forces in the east by attacking in the west to threaten enemy lines of communication in the Iron Triangle. Ridgway recommended a two-division attack moving on the Route 33 axis towards Ch'orwon. He thought such an attack would have a good chance of succeeding since intelligence indicated that only four PVA armies occupied the 40 miles (64 km) sector of the front west of Chuncheon and since Peng would need at least a week or ten days to shift any material part of his mass from the east to oppose the advance. Nor had PVA/KPA forces on the western front shown much aggressiveness. Enemy attacks had forced back some patrol base and outpost units and had tested the main line in both the I Corps and IX Corps sectors, but these attacks had been isolated affairs, not coordinated actions in a concerted holding operation.

Judging PVA/KPA forces in the east central area to be clearly overextended after he reconnoitered the front on 19 May, Ridgway enlarged his concept to take advantage of their vulnerability and ordered Van Fleet to attack across the entire front. Agreeing that the PVA/KPA forces could be trapped, Van Fleet laid out an operation that he believed could produce decisive results if the attack moved fast enough. Though stabilizing the line in the east remained a problem, he now viewed that task with no great alarm even though PVA/KPA forces were deepening and strengthening their penetration. If for no other reason, he expected their logistical difficulties in the mountains to slow if not stop their advance within a matter of days; they would have created only a "long bag" that could be closed behind them by rapid drives to block their main routes of resupply and withdrawal. Van Fleet's plan called for I Corps, IX Corps and part of the 1st Marine Division at the left of X Corps to advance on 20 May toward the Munsan-Chuncheon segment of Line Topeka. Once the Topeka segment was occupied, strikes to start closing the bag were to be made toward the Iron Triangle, one up Route 3 to secure a road center in the Yongp'yong River valley some 20 miles (32 km) above Uijongbu, another up Route 17 beyond Chuncheon to seize the complex of road junctions at the west end of the Hwacheon Reservoir.

There were several reasons to doubt that the 2nd Division could stand on the Han'gye-Nuron-ni line in the X Corps sector. The line was 15 miles (24 km) long, there were gaps, and PVA still occupied some of the important ground. Almond consequently ordered the 2nd Division to withdraw further and the 1st Marine Division to adjust its neighboring positions in accommodation. In anticipation of penetrations of X Corps' lines, Almond also acquired the 187th RCT from IX Corps for use as a fire brigade in counterattacks.

The passage of PVA 27th Army units through the Habaejae area and, farther north, the movement of 20th Army forces in the same southeasterly direction also raised the possibility that the PVA intended to sweep east along Route 20 behind ROK III Corps, turn the east flank of the X Corps, or both. The PVA 93rd Regiment, 31st Division reinforced this possibility when the regiment announced its arrival in Soksa-ri by driving the platoon of the 3rd Division's reconnaissance company out of town during the night of 19 May and by stopping a battalion of the 7th Infantry that attempted to regain the town on the 20th. The 81st Division, 27th Army also revealed its approach on 20 May by engaging the ROK 23rd Regiment, 3rd Division about 5 miles (8.0 km) north of Soksa-ri.

Yet even as the PVA IX Army Group appeared to be bringing up reserves and disposing forces for continuing its drive, there were indications that the offensive was losing impetus. Under a pummeling by B-29s, which dropped 170 tons of proximity-fused bombs ahead of the 2nd Division during the night of 19 May, the PVA 12th Army developed only one attack of any size by daylight, this by a 34th Division force of about 500 men against Company C, 9th Infantry, northeast of Hasolch'i. Ground fire, air strikes and a counterattack by Company A virtually wiped out the force. At the division's left, large groups of PVA approaching the 23rd Infantry at a trot out of the Naech'on River valley about midday on 20 May wavered under mortar and artillery fire and air attacks and turned back before reaching the regiment's line. Put on the run were formations from the 181st Division, whose forces earlier had so stoically endured a heavy air and artillery pounding while passing through the gap in the 38th Infantry's lines near Hill 1051. Rear rank forces of the 12th Army moving up in battalion-size groups meanwhile provided deeper targets for aircraft and artillery as they approached and entered assembly areas in preparation for night attacks. Kept under heavy artillery fire and precise B-29 bomb runs, none of these forces came in on the 2nd Division during the night of 20 May.

Now confident that the 2nd Division could occupy and hold the Han'gye-Nuron-ni line, Almond late on 20 May cancelled his earlier withdrawal order and turned to a greater concern of easing the threat of envelopment from the east either by a shallow swing around the ROK 7th Division forces below P'ungam-ni or by a deeper drive through the 3rd Division sector in the Soksa-ri area. Reducing the deeper threat somewhat was the arrival of the US 65th Infantry Regiment, which allowed Soule to strengthen his blocks and recapture Soksa-ri on 21 May. ROK 8th Division forces also had reached Chech'on, from where they could be moved up quickly to reinforce X Corps' east flank defenses. In the P'ungam-ni area, reassembled forces of the 5th and 7th Regiments of the ROK 7th Division provided additional protection against a PVA strike out of the Habaejae area, protection which Almond further deepened and widened with the bulk of the still somewhat decrepit 38th Infantry. To relieve the threat in both the P'ungam-ni and Soksa-ri areas, Almond ordered an attack on 22 May to seize and block enemy movement through Habaejae by Task Force Yoke, a group of infantry, tanks and artillery units that he constituted under the command of Col. Lawrence K. Ladue, the deputy Corps' commander.

The force of PVA attacks declined all across the X Corps front on 21 May, but grew stronger in the ROK III Corps' sector and at the left of ROK I Corps. ROK 9th Division forces between Soksa-ri and Hajinbu-ri fell below Route 20 under attacks by the PVA 81st Division, while ROK 3rd Division units above Route 20 northeast of Hajinbu-ri began to collapse under KPA V Corps assaults. Near Yuch'on-ni (37.667°N 128.625°E), 4 miles (6.4 km) east of Hajinbu-ri, the ROK 20th Regiment, 11th Division holding positions facing north and northwest athwart Route 20 to prevent an enemy sweep behind the bulk of the ROK I Corps on Line Waco was hit hard by forces of KPA II Corps. The PVA/KPA pressure continued at all points of attack into the evening.

Despite the PVA/KPA action in the Hajinbu-ri-Yuch'on-ni area and continuing reports of reserves moving south, Van Fleet was convinced, as he reported to Ridgway, that "the enemy's initial punch in the eastern and central eastern section is shot." To keep PVA/KPA forces from slipping out of the bottom of their long bag in the Hajinbu-ri area, Van Fleet late on 21 May directed ROK III Corps to make no further withdrawals and to restore defensive positions north of Route 20. ROK I Corps meanwhile was to fall back from Line Waco to positions that would secure Route 20 between Yuch'on-ni and Kangnung on the coast. Anxious to close the top of the bag, Van Fleet enlarged and substantially altered the concept of the counterattack opened on 20 May. The main effort was now to be directed toward seizing the road centers, with the front otherwise being advanced only as necessary to protect the main effort. I Corps, as under Van Fleet's earlier order, was to seize the road hub in Yongp'yong River valley. His new order shifted the IX Corps-X Corps boundary east as of 23 May to give IX Corps the Hongch'on-Chuncheon-Hwacheon road and the road center on the western side of the Hwacheon Reservoir as its main objective. X Corps was to open a general advance on 23 May to seize the road complex in the Yanggu-Inje area east of the reservoir.

Even as Van Fleet ordered ROK III Corps to regain positions above Route 20, the ROK 3rd and 9th Divisions again tumbled back under enemy attacks that by early afternoon of 22 May completely dispersed both divisions and overran their command posts. Korean Military Advisory Group (KMAG) advisers notified Van Fleet that the commanders of both divisions and the principal staff members of the ROK 9th Division had disappeared. The ROK 3rd Division commander, Brig. Gen. Kim Jong-oh, at first believed to have been either killed or taken captive, was located along with many members of the division on 23 May some 15 miles (24 km) southeast of Hajinbu-ri. Under the direction of the KMAG adviser, troops of the ROK 9th Division meanwhile assembled 7 miles (11 km) southwest of Hajinbu-ri. With the commander, Brig. Gen. Choi Suk, still unlocated, Yu placed the deputy Corps' commander in charge. Convinced by the continuing failure of the Corps that Yu and his staff could not conduct operations successfully, Van Fleet late on 22 May ordered the ROK III Corps headquarters inactivated, the ROK 3rd Division transferred to ROK I Corps, the ROK 9th Division given to X Corps and X Corps made responsible for the former ROK III Corps sector. He also ordered the ROK forward headquarters off the front and placed ROK I Corps under his own direct command.

In the Yuch'on-ni area, KPA II Corps forces early on 22 May cut Route 20, turned their attack east, and dispersed the ROK 20th Regiment, 11th Division. Given the strong PVA/KPA effort in the Hajinburi-Yuch'on-ni region over the past two days, the approach of reserves, and no evidence that enemy forces were having serious logistical problems, the Eighth Army intelligence officer, in contrast to Van Fleet's sensing that the enemy offensive had lost its momentum, predicted a continuation in force along and below Route 20. The location and course of enemy forces below Hajinbu-ri convinced Tarkenton that they would attempt a deep southwestward push toward P'yongch'ang and Yongwol along Route 20 as a preliminary to the seizure of the Chech'on road and rail hub; the eastward enemy drive appeared to be aimed at enveloping Kangnung.

Van Fleet countered the threat to Kangnung with new orders to ROK I Corps, then still withdrawing from Line Waco to positions above Route 20 between Yuch'on-ni and the coast under his orders of the 21st. I Corps' commander General Paik Sun-yup was to organize strong positions facing west astride Route 20 to block any eastward enemy drive along the road, but if he could not hold a continuous line above Route 20 with his west flank refused, he was to set his forces in perimeter around the Kangnung road center. But as Van Fleet dispatched these orders near midnight on 22 May, the composite of recent and current reports from the front confirmed a general PVA/KPA withdrawal. Now three days into their advance, I Corps and IX Corps had found contact progressively more difficult. The first indications of PVA/KPA withdrawal on the X Corps' front had appeared late on 21 May. Evidently withdrawal orders had taken longer to reach the deeper PVA/KPA forces in the Hajinburi-Yuch'on-ni area, forces who began moving back after dark on 22 May.

== Aftermath ==
Crippling losses, particularly in the PVA 12th and 15th Armies, had forced Peng to abandon his offensive. The inability of these weakening armies to mount effective attacks against the adjusted X Corps' positions after 19 May had endangered the PVA/KPA forces farther east since the failure to advance astride Route 24 meant that the PVA/KPA moving to and below Route 20 in the Hajinbu-ri-Yuch'on-ni sector were simply taking themselves farther and farther out on a limb. Though fresh reserves were available, the casualties among the assault echelons had been exceptionally heavy, largely as a result of the Van Fleet rate of artillery fire and round the-clock air attacks, and Peng apparently decided against subjecting his reserves to the same punishment and extreme losses. Peng called for a rapid, almost precipitate, withdrawal, with covering forces fighting only light delaying actions except where strong blocks were needed to keep withdrawal routes open. The previous general disposition of forces was to be restored, the Hwacheon Reservoir again marking the division between PVA and KPA sectors and also marking generally the northern limit of the withdrawal.

During the month of May alone, an estimated 65,000 Chinese and North Korean soldiers were killed in action fighting against the 2nd Infantry Division. In a single valley where artillery had unleashed its fury, the corpses of over 5,000 PVA/KPA soldiers were counted.

For the PVA armies south and southeast of the reservoir, plans for getting past the lake were designed to avoid a jam-up of troops when they reached that obstacle. The 20th and 27th Armies of the IX Army Group were to withdraw around the east end of the reservoir, then move along its northern bank to the west end. Leading the way, the 20th Army was to set up a blocking position between Hwacheon town and the reservoir. The 27th Army, on coming out of the Hajinbu-ri area with its rear covered by KPA II and V Corps, was to concentrate behind the 20th. The KPA rearguards were to set up defenses east of the reservoir, V Corps between the reservoir and the near outskirts of Inje, II Corps from Inje eastward. PVA III Army Group, with the 12th Army returned to its control, was to withdraw around the west end of the reservoir. From below Chuncheon, the PVA 60th Army, less its 81st Division still with the 12th Army, was to fight a delaying action along Route 17 to hold the road open for the 15th and 12th Armies as they withdrew northwest, passed through the ground below the reservoir, and moved through Hwacheon town into the Iron Triangle. The rearguard 60th Army, on passing behind the 20th Army at Hwacheon, was to follow. West of the Bukhan River, the three armies of the XIX Army Group were to withdraw generally northwestward, pulling away from the I Corps and the IX Corps toward areas located on either side of the upper reaches of the Imjin River and in the Iron Triangle. Northwest of Seoul, KPA I Corps was initially to withdraw behind the lower Imjin and was eventually to move west beyond the Ryesong River for rest and rebuilding.

On 20 May the UN began their general counteroffensive which by mid-June had erased all PVA/KPA gains in the Spring Offensive.

== See also ==
- Chinese Spring Offensive
- UN May–June 1951 counteroffensive
