= 43rd =

43rd is the ordinal form of the number 43. 43rd or Forty-third may also refer to:

- A fraction, 1/43, equal to one of 43 equal parts

== Geography ==
- 43rd meridian east, a line of longitude
- 43rd meridian west, a line of longitude
- 43rd parallel north, a circle of latitude
- 43rd parallel south, a circle of latitude
- 43rd Street (disambiguation)

== Military ==
- 43rd Battalion (disambiguation)
- 43rd Brigade (disambiguation)
- 43rd Division (disambiguation)
- 43rd Regiment (disambiguation)
- 43rd Squadron (disambiguation)

== Other ==
- 43rd Amendment
- 43rd century
- 43rd century BC
- 43d Elizabeth, alternative name for the Poor Relief Act 1601

== See also ==
- 43 (disambiguation)
