= 56th Motorized Infantry Brigade (People's Republic of China) =

Brigade of the People's Liberation Army

29th Division (1949-54) 29th Infantry Division (1954-60) 29th Army Division (1960-69) 49th Army Division (1969-76) 56th Army Division (1976-85) 56th Infantry Division (1985-98) 56th Motorized Infantry Brigade (1998-2017) 56th Heavy Combined Arms Brigade (2017-)
- Active: 1949.2 - present
- Country: People's Republic of China
- Branch: People's Liberation Army Ground Force, People's Volunteer Army
- Type: Combined Arms
- Size: Brigade
- Part of: 76th Group Army
- Garrison/HQ: Wuwei, Gansu
- Engagements: Chinese Civil War, Korean War

The 29th Division, now as the 56th Heavy Combined Arms Brigade is a military formation of the People's Liberation Army of the People's Republic of China. It is now one of six combined arms brigades of the PLA 76th Group Army. It is the unit that experienced the most times of unit transferring in the PLA Ground Force.

The 29th Division (Chinese: 第29师) was created In February 1949 under the Regulation of the Redesignations of All Organizations and Units of the Army, issued by Central Military Commission on November 1, 1948, basing on the 6th Brigade, 2nd Column of PLA Zhongyuan Field Army. Its history could be traced to 1st Regiment of Eastern Forward Column, 129th Division of Eighth Route Army, formed in December 1937.

The division is part of 10th Corps. Under the flag of 29th division it took part in several major battles in the Chinese Civil War.

In January 1951 the division was transferred to 15th Corps and entered Korea as a part of People's Volunteer Army. The division took part in the Fifth Phase Offensive in 1951 and the Battle of Triangle Hill in 1952 during its deployment in Korea and allegedly inflicted 17714 casualties to UN Forces. A soldier from 29th Division, Qiu Shaoyun, was posthumously honored as a "First-Class Hero of the Chinese People's Volunteers Army" as he adhered to ambush discipline in order to veil the position of the platoon and burned to death by napalm bombs.

In May 1954 the division returned from Korea with the Corps HQ and renamed as the 29th Infantry Division (Chinese: 步兵第29师) of the National Defense Force. The division stationed at Huayuan, Hubei province.

In May 1958 the division received 45th Tank Self-Propelled Artillery Regiment from 45th Army Division. By then the division was composed of:

- 85th Infantry Regiment;
- 86th Infantry Regiment;
- 87th Infantry Regiment;
- 45th Tank Self-Propelled Artillery Regiment.
- 323rd Artillery Regiment (from 149th Regiment of 50th Division).

In July 1960 the division was detached from 15th Corps and was put under control of Wuhan Military Region. In the same year the division was renamed as the 29th Army Division (Chinese: 陆军第29师).

In July 1967 a detachment from this division took part in the Wuhan Incident, guarding Mao's hotel from mutinous Independent Division of Hubei Provincial Military District. From August 1967 to October 1968 the division was returned to now 15th Airborne Corps, becoming an Army unit under the control of Air Force.

In October 1968 the division was transferred to newly formed 17th Army Corps, and its 45th Tank Self-Propelled Artillery Regiment was detached and transferred to 11th Tank Division.

In December 1969 the division was renamed as the 49th Army Division (Chinese: 陆军第49师). All its regiments renamed as follows:

- 145th Infantry Regiment (former 85th);
- 146th Infantry Regiment (former 86th);
- 147th Infantry Regiment (former 87th);
- Artillery Regiment (former 323rd).

In November 1972 the division was detached from the Corps and was put under control of Wuhan Military Region again after 17th Army Corps' disbandment.

In March 1976 the division moved to Wuwei, Gansu and was transferred to 19th Army Corps, renaming as the 56th Army Division (Chinese: 陆军第56师).All its regiments renamed as follows:

- 166th Infantry Regiment (former 145th);
- 167th Infantry Regiment (former 146th);
- 168th Infantry Regiment (former 147th);
- Artillery Regiment.

In September 1985, the division was renamed as the 56th Infantry Division (Chinese: 步兵第56师) and was transferred to 47th Army after 19th Corps' disbandment. The division maintained as a Northern Infantry Division, Catalogue B from 1985 to 1998.

In December 1989 its 168th Regiment was re-organized as a special security regiment.

In October 1998 the division was reduced and re-organized as the 56th Motorized Infantry Brigade (Chinese: 摩托化步兵第56旅).

In April 2017 the brigade was redesignated as the 56th Heavy Combined Arms Brigade (Chinese: 重型合成第56旅).
