= 45th Airborne Division =

Chinese military unit

45th Division (1949–54) 45th Infantry Division (1954–60) 45th Army Division (1960–61) 45th Airborne Division (1961–85) 45th Airborne Brigade (1985–1992) 45th Airborne Division (1992–present)
- Founded: February 1949
- Country: China
- Allegiance: Chinese Communist Party
- Branch: People's Liberation Army Air Force, People's Volunteer Army
- Type: Division
- Role: Airborne Mechanized Infantry
- Part of: 15th Airborne Corps
- Garrison/HQ: Huangpi, Wuhan, Hubei province
- Engagements: Chinese Civil War, Korean War, Vietnam War, Sino-Vietnamese War

The 45th Division (45 div) (Chinese: 第45师), latterly known as 45th Airborne Division is a military formation of the People's Liberation Army (PLA) and People's Liberation Army Air Force (PLAAF) of the People's Republic of China (PRC). It is now one of two mobile divisions of PLA 15th Airborne Corps, and a Rapid Reaction, First Level unit.

The 45 Div was created in February 1949 under the Regulation of the Redesignations of All Organizations and Units of the Army, issued by Central Military Commission on 1 November 1948, as part of the 27th Brigade, 9th Column of PLA Zhongyuan Field Army, formed in August 1947.

The division was a part of 15th Airborne Corps (15 corps). Under the flag of 45 Div it took part in the Chinese Civil War.

In March 1951 the division invaded Korea as a part of the People's Volunteer Army; the division took part in the Fifth Phase Offensive in 1951 and the Battle of Triangle Hill against UN forces.

On 19 October 1952, a soldier from 45 Div, Huang Jiguang, hurled himself against a machine gun slit on the blockhouse after running out of ammunition, blocking enemy fire while sacrificing his life. He was posthumously honoured as a "First-Class Hero of the Chinese People's Volunteers Army".

In May 1954 45 Div returned from Korea with 15 Corps HQ and renamed as 45th Infantry Division'(Chinese: 步兵第45师) of the National Defense Force, stationed at Huangpi, Hubei province.

By mid 1954 the division comprised

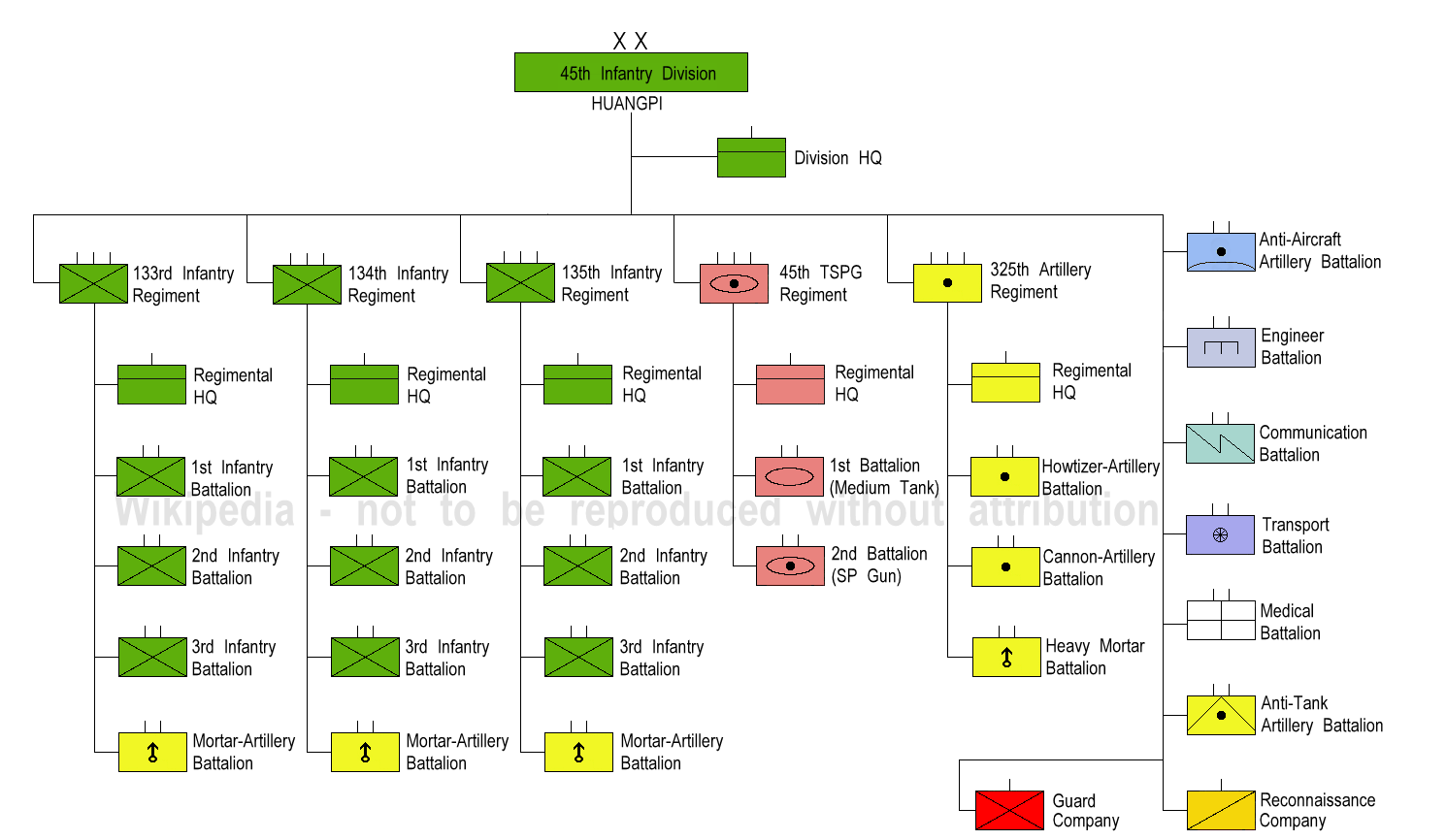
45th Infantry Division, 1955 to 1958

- 133rd Infantry Regiment;
- 134th Infantry Regiment;
- 135th Infantry Regiment;
- 45th Tank Self-Propelled Artillery Regiment;
- 325th Artillery Regiment.

In May 1958 45th Tank Self-Propelled Artillery Regiment was transferred to 29th Infantry Division.

In April 1960 the division was renamed as 45th Army Division(Chinese: 陆军第45师).

On June 1, 1961, the division was converted to an Airborne Division, renaming itself as 45th Airborne Division(Chinese: 空降兵第45师). The division was then transferred to the Air Force along with the now 15th Airborne Corps.By then the division was composed of:

- 133rd Airborne Regiment;
- 134th Airborne Regiment;
- 135th Airborne Regiment;
- 325th Artillery Regiment.

In July 1967, during the Wuhan Incident, 133rd Airborne Regiment, 45th Airborne Division relieved and disarmed the mutinous Independent Division of Hubei Provincial Military District.

In December 1969 its 325th Artillery Regiment was renamed as Artillery Regiment, 45th Airborne Division.

In 1975 and 1983 all airborne divisions were reduced. In 1983 the division's 133rd Regiment was re-organized as a catalogue B training unit.

In May 1985 the division was reduced to 45th Airborne Brigade(Chinese: 空降兵第45旅), which consisted of 3 airborne battalions, 1 artillery battalion, 1 anti-tank battalion and 1 anti-aircraft battalion. The brigade was a training unit from 1985 to 1992.

From May 1985 to June 1986 Reconnaissance Company, 45th Airborne Brigade took part in the Battle of Laoshan as a part of 7th Reconnaissance Group.

In 1992 the brigade was expanded to 45th Airborne Division again. Since then the division was composed of:

- 132nd Airborne Regiment (Artillery, from 44th Brigade);
- 133rd Airborne Regiment;
- 134th Airborne Regiment.

From 2003 the division was converted to an Airborne Mechanized Division, equipping with ZBD-03 AIFVs.

The division forms part of the 15th Airborne Army and numbers around 10,000 personnel.
