= 49th Division (1st Formation) (People's Republic of China) =

49th Division (1949–50)
- Active: 1949.2 - 1950.1
- Country: People's Republic of China
- Branch: People's Liberation Army
- Type: Division
- Role: Infantry
- Part of: 17th Corps
- Engagements: Chinese Civil War

The 49th Division(Chinese: 第49师) was created in February 1949 under the Regulation of the Redesignations of All Organizations and Units of the Army, issued by Central Military Commission on November 1, 1948, basing on the 31st Brigade, 11th Column of PLA Zhongyuan Field Army. Its history could be traced to Independent Brigade of Jiluyu Military District formed in June 1946.

The division was part of 17th Corps. Under the flag of 49th division it took part in the Chinese Civil War.

In January 1950 the division inactivated and merged with Xingren Military Sub-district.

As of early 1951 division was composed of:

- 145th Regiment;
- 146th Regiment;
- 147th Regiment.
