= 50th Division (1st Formation) (People's Republic of China) =

50th Division (1949–1952)
- Active: 1949.6 - 1952.3
- Country: People's Republic of China
- Branch: People's Liberation Army
- Type: Division
- Role: Infantry
- Part of: 17th Corps
- Engagements: Chinese Civil War

The 50th Division (Chinese: 第50师) was created in February 1949 under the Regulation of the Redesignations of All Organizations and Units of the Army, issued by Central Military Commission on November 1, 1948, basing on the 32nd Brigade, 11th Column of PLA Zhongyuan Field Army. Its history could be traced to 2nd Independent Brigade of Jiluyu Military District formed in June 1947.

The division was part of 17th Corps. Under the flag of 50th division it took part in the Chinese Civil War. On January 12, 1951, its 148th Regiment was transferred to 46th Division of 16th Corps. On March 13, 1952, the division was disbanded. Its 149th Regiment became 323rd Artillery Regiment, 49th Division, and its 150th Regiment became 17th Regiment of 6th Railway Engineer Division.

As of early 1951 division was composed of:

- 148th Regiment;
- 149th Regiment;
- 150th Regiment.
