= 43rd Division (People's Republic of China) =

43rd Division (1949-50)
- Active: 1949.2 - 1950.12
- Country: People's Republic of China
- Branch: People's Liberation Army
- Type: Division
- Role: Infantry
- Part of: 15th Corps
- Engagements: Chinese Civil War

The 43rd Division (Chinese: 第43师) was created in February 1949 under the Regulation of the Redesignations of All Organizations and Units of the Army, issued by Central Military Commission on November 1, 1948, basing on the 25th Brigade, 9th Column of Zhongyuan Field Army. Its history could be traced to 1st Independent Brigade of Taihang Military District, formed in late 1946.

The division was a part of 15th Corps. Under the flag of 43rd Division it took part in the Chinese Civil War.

In December 1950 the division was disbanded.

This division is not related to 43rd Airborne Division, now a mobile asset of 15th Airborne Corps.
