= 17th Corps (China) =

Former Chinese military unit

17th Corps (1949–50); 17th Army Corps (1968–73)
- Active: 1949.3–1950.7, 1968.8–1973.2
- Country: China
- Allegiance: Chinese Communist Party
- Branch: People's Liberation Army Ground Force
- Part of: Wuhan Military Region
- Garrison/HQ: Xiaochang, Hubei
- Engagements: Chinese Civil War

The 17th Corps (Chinese: 第17军), later the 17th Army Corps, was a military formation of the People's Republic of China's People's Liberation Army from 1949 to 1950 and 1968–73.

== 1st Formation ==
The 17th Corps was activated in February 1949 from 11th Column, Zhongyuan Field Army. The Corps was composed of the 49th Division, 50th Division and 51st Division. It became part of Yang Yong's 5th Army of the Second Field Army.

The Corps took part in the Chinese Civil War, especially the Huaihai Campaign.

In March 1950 the corps was inactivated and converted as Guizhou Military District (later Guizhou Provincial Military District).

== 2nd Formation ==
On August 26, 1968, 17th Army Corps(Chinese: 陆军第17军) was activated in Huayuanzhen, Xiaochang, Hubei province. Army corps commander: Zhang Zhiyin(Chinese: 张治银), commissar - Zhang Zhaojian(Chinese: 张昭剑), who was the divisional commissar of 29th Army Division during the Wuhan Incident of the Cultural Revolution.

As of its activation, the army corps was composed of:

- 29th Army Division;
- 1st Independent Division of Henan Provincial Military District, which redesignated as 50th Army Division;
- Independent Division of Hubei Provincial Military District, which redesignated as 51st Army Division.

The formation of the army corps was a result of Wuhan Incident. After the incident, the mutinous Independent Division of Hubei Provincial Military District was quickly disarmed and taken control by 15th Airborne Corps of the PLAAF and affiliated 29th Army Division that under great influence by Lin Biao. The formation of 17th Army Corps was to "strain" the "rogue" independent divisions with "modest" 29th Army Division, and was a footstep forward by the PLAAF to further Lin's influence to the PLA ground force.

In December 1969, 29th Army Division became 49th Army Division.

After the Lin Biao incident, all of Lin's "janissaries" were quickly put under arrest or investigation, including the corps commissar Zhang Zhaojian. In March 1973 the army corps was formally disbanded.

- 49th Army Division maintained in Xiaochang. Some sources declared that the division was renamed as Independent Division of Wuhan Military Region before it moved to Gansu and became 56th Army Division;
- 50th Army Division was reorganized as 1st Independent Division of Henan Provincial Military District;
- 51st Army Division was reorganized as Independent Division of Hubei Provincial Military District.
