= Independent Division of Hubei Provincial Military District =

Independent Division of Hubei Provincial Military District (1966-69) 51st Army Division (1969–73) Independent Division of Hubei Provincial Military District (1973-76)
- Active: 1966.9 - 1976.5
- Country: People's Republic of China
- Branch: People's Liberation Army
- Type: Division
- Role: Infantry

Commanders
- Notable commanders: Niu Huailong

Independent Division of Hubei Provincial Military District (Chinese: 湖北省军区独立师) was formed in September 1966 from the Public Security Contingent of Hubei province. The division was composed of six regiments (1st to 6th).

During the Cultural Revolution the division actively supported the local Million Heroes(Chinese: 百万雄师) while the other military unit, 29th Army Division supported the other faction Wuhan Workers' General Headquarters(Chinese: 工人总部).

On July 20, 1967, the mutinous independent division captured and physically assaulted Xie Fuzhi and Wang Li, and sieged Mao's hotel in Wuhan. (See Wuhan Incident.)

After the incident the division was immediately disarmed and relieved by 15th Airborne Corps. Under Mao's directive the division was split and joined 29th, 44th and 45th Divisions for "training and refitting". Its commander, Niu Huailong(Chinese: 牛怀龙) was relieved from command and put under investigation.

On July 13, 1968 the division was transferred to newly formed 17th Army Corps. In December 1969 the division was renamed as 51st Army Division(Chinese: 陆军第51师) and by then the division was composed of:

- 151st Infantry Regiment;
- 152nd Infantry Regiment;
- 153rd Infantry Regiment;
- Artillery Regiment.

In March 1973 the division was again renamed as Independent Division of Hubei Provincial Military District after 17th Army Corps' disbandment. Since then the division was composed of four regiments(1st to 4th).

In May 1976 the division was disbanded.
