= 43 =

43 may refer to:

- 43 (number), the natural number following 42 and preceding 44
- one of the years 43 BC, AD 43, 1943, 2043
- Licor 43, also known as "Cuarenta Y Tres" ("Forty-three" in Spanish)
- George W. Bush, 43rd president of the United States, nicknamed "Bush 43" to distinguish from his father
- "Forty Three", a song by Karma to Burn from the album Appalachian Incantation, 2010
- 43 Ariadne, a main-belt asteroid
- 43rd Regiment
- The international calling code for Austria

== See also ==
- 43rd (disambiguation)
