= 51st Division (1st Formation) (People's Republic of China) =

51st Division (1949–1952)
- Active: 1949.2 - 1952.3
- Country: People's Republic of China
- Branch: People's Liberation Army
- Type: Division
- Role: Infantry
- Part of: 17th Corps
- Engagements: Chinese Civil War

The 51st Division (Chinese: 第51师) was created In February 1949 under the Regulation of the Redesignations of All Organizations and Units of the Army, issued by Central Military Commission on November 1, 1948, basing on the 1st, 3rd Independent Brigade and Independent Detachment of Jiluyu Military District.

The division is part of 17th Corps. Under the flag of 51st division it took part in the Chinese Civil War. On March 13, 1952 the division was disbanded.

As of disbandment division was composed of:

- 151st Regiment;
- 152nd Regiment;
- 153rd Regiment.
