= Independent Division of Henan Provincial Military District (1st Formation) =

Independent Division of Henan Provincial Military District (1966) 1st Independent Division of Henan Provincial Military District (1966–69) 50th Army Division (1969–73) 1st Independent Division of Henan Provincial Military District (1973–76) Independent Division of Henan Provincial Military District (1976–82)
- Active: 1966.6 - 1982.4
- Country: People's Republic of China
- Branch: People's Liberation Army
- Type: Division
- Role: Infantry

Independent Division of Henan Provincial Military District(Chinese: 河南省军区独立师)(1st Formation) was formed on June 20, 1966, from eight independent battalions from military sub-districts of Henan province. The division was composed of three regiments (1st to 3rd infantry).

In September the division was renamed as 1st Independent Division of Henan Provincial Military District (Chinese: 河南省军区独立第1师) following 2nd Independent Division of Henan Provincial Military District's formation.

On September 1, 1968, the division was transferred to newly formed 17th Army Corps. In December 1969 the division was renamed as 50th Army Division(Chinese: 陆军第50师), and all its regiments were renamed as follows:

- 148th Infantry Regiment;
- 149th Infantry Regiment;
- 150th Infantry Regiment.

Artillery Regiment was activated in unknown time between 1969 and 1976.

On February 9, 1973, the division was returned to provincial military district's control following the disbandment of 17th Army Corps, and renamed as 1st Independent Division of Henan Provincial Military District again.

On April 28, the division was further renamed as Independent Division of Henan Provincial Military District again following 2nd Independent Division of Henan Provincial Military District's disbandment.

On April 19, 1982, the division was disbanded.
