= 44th Airborne Division (People's Republic of China) =

44th Division (1949–54) 44th Infantry Division (1954–60) 44th Army Division (1960–61) 44th Airborne Division (1961–85) 44th Airborne Brigade (1985–1992) 44th Airborne Division (1992-2017)
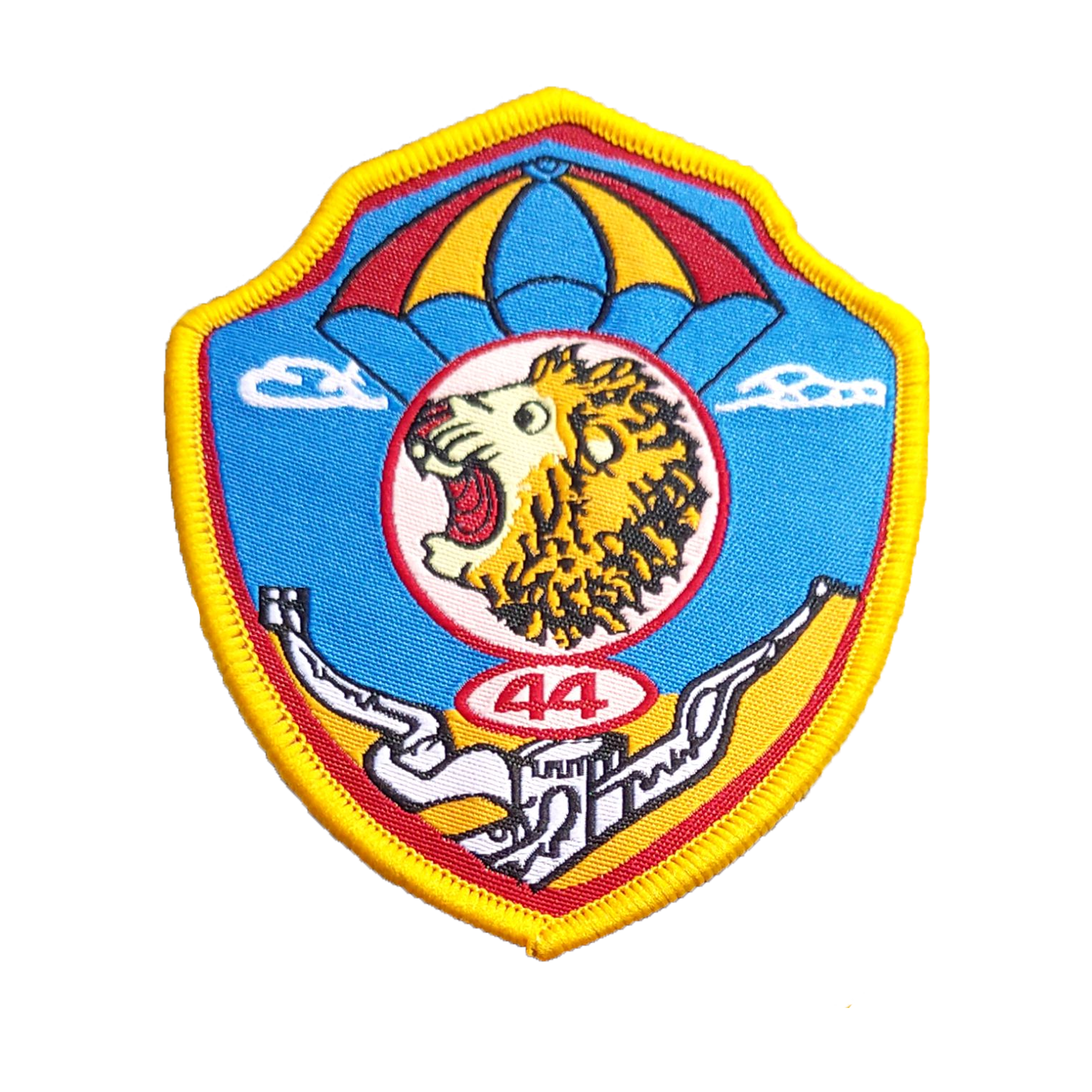
- Founded: February 1949-2017
- Country: China
- Allegiance: Chinese Communist Party
- Branch: People's Liberation Army Air Force
- Type: Division
- Role: Airborne infantry
- Part of: People's Liberation Army Air Force Airborne Corps
- Garrison/HQ: Guangshui, Hubei province
- Engagements: Chinese Civil War, Korean War, Vietnam War, Sino-Vietnamese War

The 44th Airborne Division (MUCD: Unit 95971) was a military formation of the People's Liberation Army Air Force Airborne Corps.

== History ==
The 44th Division (Chinese: 第44师) was created in February 1949 under the Regulation of the Redesignations of All Organizations and Units of the Army, issued by the Central Military Commission on November 1, 1948, basing on the 26th Brigade, 9th Column of PLA Zhongyuan Field Army, formed in late 1946.

The division was a part of 15th Corps. It took part in the Chinese Civil War under the flag of the 44th Division.

In March 1951, the division entered Korea as a part of the People's Volunteer Army and took part in the Fifth Phase Offensive in 1951 and the Battle of Triangle Hill. It suffered heavy casualties to American forces at the Battle of Hwacheon. It marked the end of the Chinese Spring Offensive.

In May 1954, the division returned from Korea with the Corps HQ, renamed as the 44th Infantry Division (Chinese: 步兵第44师) of the National Defense Force. It was stationed at Guangshui, Hubei province. By then, the division was composed of:

- 130th Infantry Regiment;
- 131st Infantry Regiment;
- 132nd Infantry Regiment;
- 324th Artillery Regiment.

In April 1960, the division was renamed as the 44th Army Division (Chinese: 陆军第44师).

On June 1, 1961, the division was converted to an Airborne Division, renaming itself as the 44th Airborne Division (Chinese: 空降兵第44师). The division was then transferred to the Air Force, along with the now 15th Airborne Corps. The division was composed then of:

- 130th Airborne Regiment;
- 131st Airborne Regiment;
- 132nd Airborne Regiment;
- 324th Artillery Regiment.

In July 1967, during the Wuhan Incident, 132nd Airborne Regiment, 44th Airborne Division relieved and disarmed the mutinous Independent Division of Hubei Provincial Military District.

In December 1969, its 324th Artillery Regiment was renamed as Artillery Regiment, 44th Airborne Division.

In 1975 and 1983, all airborne divisions were reduced. In 1983, the division's 130th Regiment was re-organized as a catalogue B training unit.

In May 1985, the division was reduced to the 44th Airborne Brigade (Chinese: 空降兵第44旅), which consisted of three airborne battalions, one artillery battalion, one anti-tank battalion, and one anti-aircraft battalion. The brigade was an Emergency Mobile Unit from 1985 to 1992.

From May 1985 to June 1986, Reconnaissance Company, 44th Airborne Brigade took part in the Battle of Laoshan as a part of the 7th Reconnaissance Group. It took part in the enforced martial law and the crackdown on protests in Beijing, June 1989.

In 1992, the brigade was expanded to the 44th Airborne Division again. Since then, the division has been composed of:

- 130th Airborne Regiment;
- 131st Airborne Regiment;
- Yingshan Station

In 2017, the 44th Airborne Division was disbanded, with the 130th and 131st becoming Brigades instead of regiments.
