= 43rd Group =

43rd Group may refer to:

- 43d Operations Group, also previously known as the "43rd Bombardment Group", is a unit of the United States Air Force
- 43rd Sustainment Brigade (United States), also previously known as the "43rd Area Support Group", is a unit of the United States Army

== See also ==
- 43 Group, an anti-fascist organization in post-World War II Britain
- 43rd Division (disambiguation)
- 43rd Brigade (disambiguation)
- 43rd Regiment (disambiguation)
- 43rd Squadron (disambiguation)
