= 43rd Street =

43rd Street may refer to:

- 43rd (CTA station), Chicago, Illinois
- 43rd Street (Manhattan), New York City
