= 43rd Division =

43rd Division may refer to:

== Infantry divisions ==
- 43rd Division (People's Republic of China)
- 43rd Airborne Division, People's Republic of China
- 43rd Reserve Division, Imperial German Army
- 43rd Division (Imperial Japanese Army)
- 43rd Division (North Korea), North Korean Army
- 43rd Infantry Division (Russian Empire)
- 43rd Infantry Division (Somalia), Somali National Army
- 43rd Guards Rifle Division, Soviet Union
- 43rd Rifle Division, Soviet Union
- 43rd (Wessex) Infantry Division, British Army
- 43rd Infantry Division (United States), United States Army

== Cavalry divisions ==
- 43rd Cavalry Division, Soviet Union

== Armoured divisions ==
- 43rd Armoured Division (India)
- 43rd Tank Division (Soviet Union)

== Aviation divisions ==
- 43rd Air Division, United States Air Force

== See also ==
- List of military divisions by number
- 43rd Group (disambiguation)
- 43rd Brigade (disambiguation)
- 43rd Regiment (disambiguation)
- 43rd Battalion (disambiguation)
- 43rd Squadron (disambiguation)
