= 43rd Battalion =

43rd Battalion may refer to:

- 43rd Battalion (Australia), an infantry battalion of the Australian Imperial Force that served during World War I
- 2/43rd Battalion (Australia), an infantry battalion of the Second Australian Imperial Force that served during World War II
- 43rd (6th (City) Battalion, The Royal Northumberland Fusiliers) Royal Tank Regiment, a unit of the United Kingdom Army
- 43rd Battalion Virginia Cavalry, also known as "Mosby's Rangers", a unit of the Confederate (Southern) Army during the American Civil War
- 43rd Signal Battalion (United States), a unit of the United States Army
- 43rd Battalion (Cameron Highlanders of Canada), CEF

== See also ==
- 43rd Division (disambiguation)
- 43rd Group (disambiguation)
- 43rd Brigade (disambiguation)
- 43rd Regiment (disambiguation)
- 43rd Squadron (disambiguation)
