= 43 Squadron =

43 Squadron or 43rd Squadron may refer to:

- No. 43 Squadron RAAF, a unit of the Royal Australian Air Force
- No. 43 Squadron RAF, a unit of the United Kingdom Royal Air Force
- 43d Fighter Squadron, a unit of the United States Air Force
- 43d Flying Training Squadron, a unit of the United States Air Force
- 43d Aeromedical Evacuation Squadron, a unit of the United States Air Force

== See also ==
- 43rd Division (disambiguation)
- 43rd Group (disambiguation)
- 43rd Brigade (disambiguation)
- 43rd Regiment (disambiguation)
- 43rd Battalion (disambiguation)
