= 43rd Brigade =

43rd Brigade may refer to:

== India ==
- 43rd Indian Brigade of the First World War
- 43rd Independent Gurkha Infantry Brigade of the Second World War

== Netherlands ==
- 43rd Mechanized Brigade (Netherlands)

== Spain ==
- 43rd Mixed Brigade

== Ukraine ==
- 43rd Artillery Brigade (Ukraine)
- 43rd Mechanized Brigade (Ukraine)

== United Kingdom ==
- 43rd Anti-Aircraft Brigade (United Kingdom)
- 43rd Infantry Brigade (United Kingdom)
- 43rd (Howitzer) Brigade, Royal Field Artillery

== United States ==
- 43rd Military Police Brigade (United States)
- 43rd Sustainment Brigade

== See also ==
- 43rd Division (disambiguation)
- 43rd Group (disambiguation)
- 43rd Regiment (disambiguation)
- 43rd Battalion (disambiguation)
- 43rd Squadron (disambiguation)
