= 43rd Regiment =

43rd Regiment or 43rd Infantry Regiment may refer to:

- 43rd Erinpura Regiment, a unit of the British Indian Army
- 43rd Infantry Regiment (France), a unit of the French Army
- 43rd Infantry Regiment (Philippine Commonwealth Army), a unit of the Philippine Commonwealth Army
- 43rd (Monmouthshire) Regiment of Foot, a unit of the United Kingdom Army
- 43rd Royal Tank Regiment, a armoured unit of the United Kingdom Army
- 43rd Infantry Regiment (United States), a unit of the United States Army
- 43rd Air Defense Artillery Regiment, a unit of the United States Army
- 43rd Bomber Aviation Regiment, an aviation unit of the Yugoslav Air Force

American Civil War regiments

- 43rd Illinois Volunteer Infantry Regiment, a unit of the Union (North) Army
- 43rd Wisconsin Volunteer Infantry Regiment, a unit of the Union (North) Army
- 43rd New York Volunteer Infantry Regiment, a unit of the Union (North) Army
- 43rd Regiment Massachusetts Volunteer Infantry, a unit of the Union (North) Army
- 43rd Indiana Infantry Regiment, a unit of the Union (North) Army
- 43rd Ohio Infantry, a unit of the Union (North) Army
- 43rd United States Colored Infantry, a unit of the Union (North) Army
- 43rd Georgia Volunteer Infantry, a unit of the Confederate Army
- 43rd North Carolina Infantry, a unit of the Confederate Army
- 43rd Mississippi Infantry, a unit of the Confederate Army

== See also ==
- 43rd Division (disambiguation)
- 43rd Group (disambiguation)
- 43rd Brigade (disambiguation)
- 43rd Battalion (disambiguation)
- 43rd Squadron (disambiguation)
