= Second Field Army =

Chinese Communist military formation during the Chinese Civil War

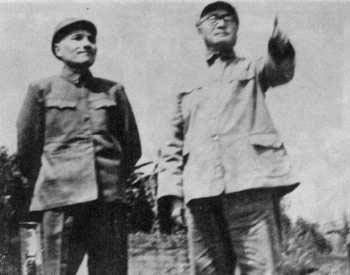
Commander Liu Bocheng (right) and Commissar Deng Xiaoping of the Second Field Army

The Second Field Army (第二野战军), initially known as the Central Plains Field Army (中原野战军) or the Liu-Deng Army, was a major military formation of the Chinese Communist Party during the last stages of the Chinese Civil War.

The Second Field Army took control of PLA troops in central China, with Liu Bocheng as commander and Deng Xiaoping as commissar. It comprised three armies: the 3rd Army (10th, 11th Corps, and 12th Corps) 4th Army (13th, 14th, and 15th Corps), and 5th Army (16th, 17th Corps and 18th Corps), plus a special technical column, and totalled 128,000 men. After 1949, the Second Field Army was stationed in southwest China and controlled five provinces - Yunnan, Guizhou, Sichuan, Xikang, and Tibet.

The 15th Army ("Corps") was transferred to the Second Field Army in 1950.
