= People's Liberation Army Air Force Airborne Corps =

Airborne corps of the People's Liberation Army Air Force

- 中国人民解放军空降兵军
- Airborne Corps Badge
- Active: September 17, 1950–present
- Country: China
- Allegiance: Chinese Communist Party
- Branch: People's Liberation Army Air Force
- Type: Air force ground forces and special forces
- Role: Air Assault; Rapid Reaction Force
- Size: 45,000 personnel
- Garrison/HQ: Xiaogan, Hubei
- Nicknames: "Thousand Year Army" (千年军); Heavenly troops from the sky (天降神兵)
- Mottos: 首战用我，用我必胜 (I am the first to be deployed, when I am deployed I will win)
- Anniversaries: September 17
- Engagements: Chinese Civil War; Korean War; Sino-Vietnamese conflicts (1979–1991)

Insignia
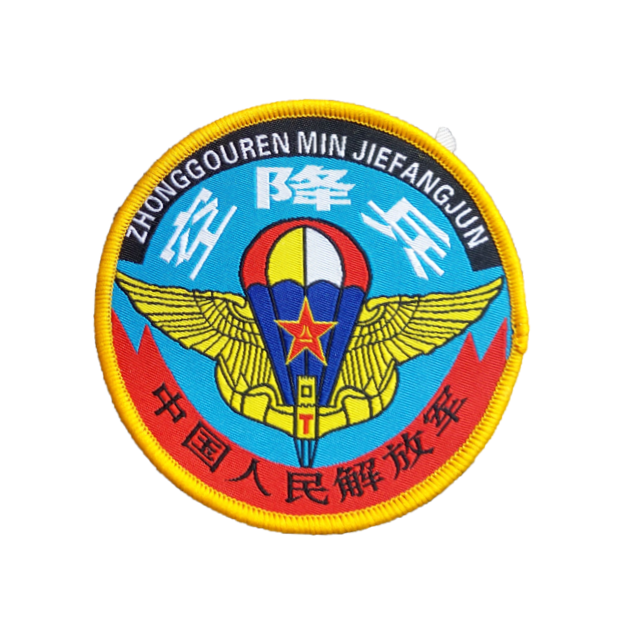
- Patch (1999-2017)

Aircraft flown
- Helicopter: Harbin Z-20KS
- Attack helicopter: Harbin Z-20KA; Changhe Z-10K; Harbin Z-9W
- Cargo helicopter: Harbin Z-20K; Changhe Z-8; Mil Mi-171
- Utility helicopter: Harbin Z-9

The People's Liberation Army Air Force Airborne Corps (Chinese: 中国人民解放军空降兵军) is a corps grade airborne and air assault force subordinated to People's Liberation Army Air Force (PLAAF) headquarters. Before April 2017, the Airborne Corps was called the PLAAF 15th Airborne Corps.

== Mission ==
The Airborne Corps is a rapid reaction force tasked with attacking "political, military, and economic strategic key points", capturing targets or areas in the enemy rear, and conducting special operations in the enemy rear. It may also have domestic security roles.

== History ==
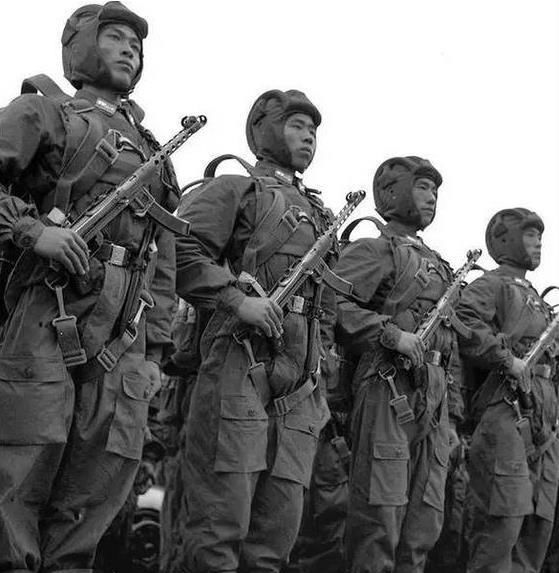
PLA paratroopers in 1955.

On July 17, 1950, the Central Military Commission made plans to establish the People's Liberation Army Air Force 1st Ground Forces Brigade. It was officially founded on September 17, 1950, which is celebrated as the unit's anniversary, with the first parachute jump happening on September 29, 1950. Initially, the brigade only had 5030 members. In December, it was renamed to the 1st Ground Forces Division, in 1955 it was renamed to the Paratrooper's Division, then to the Airborne Corps Division on April 28, 1957.

The airborne force expanded in July 1961 with the addition of 15th Corps and its subordinate 44th and 45th Divisions. The corps was renamed as the 15th Airborne Corps and the existing airborne division was added to it; the corps third division was the 43rd Division. The new formation was subordinated to PLAAF headquarters and the Wuhan Military Region air force. It was headquartered in Xiaogan, Hubei. The corps capabilities were limited as it was made of lightly armed infantry.

The corps deployed units to Wuhan in 1967 during the Cultural Revolution to suppress a regional uprising.

In 1985, as part of Deng Xiaoping's force reductions, one division disbanded and the others downsized into brigades.

The corps deployed to Beijing during the 1989 Tiananmen Square protests and massacre to suppress the protests.

The corps was designated as the "lead element" of the PLA's rapid reaction force in 1992; it had been training for the role since the late 1980s. The brigades were upgraded back to divisions; by 1993, there were three - the 43rd, 44th and 45th - with 10,000 troops each. The addition of heavy weapons began before the 1990s, but was limited by air mobility restrictions. Air mobility was improved when the PLAAF began receiving Ilyushin Il-76 strategic airlifters in the mid-1990.

The Airborne Corps assisted in disaster relief after the 1998 China floods.

=== 2008 Sichuan earthquake ===
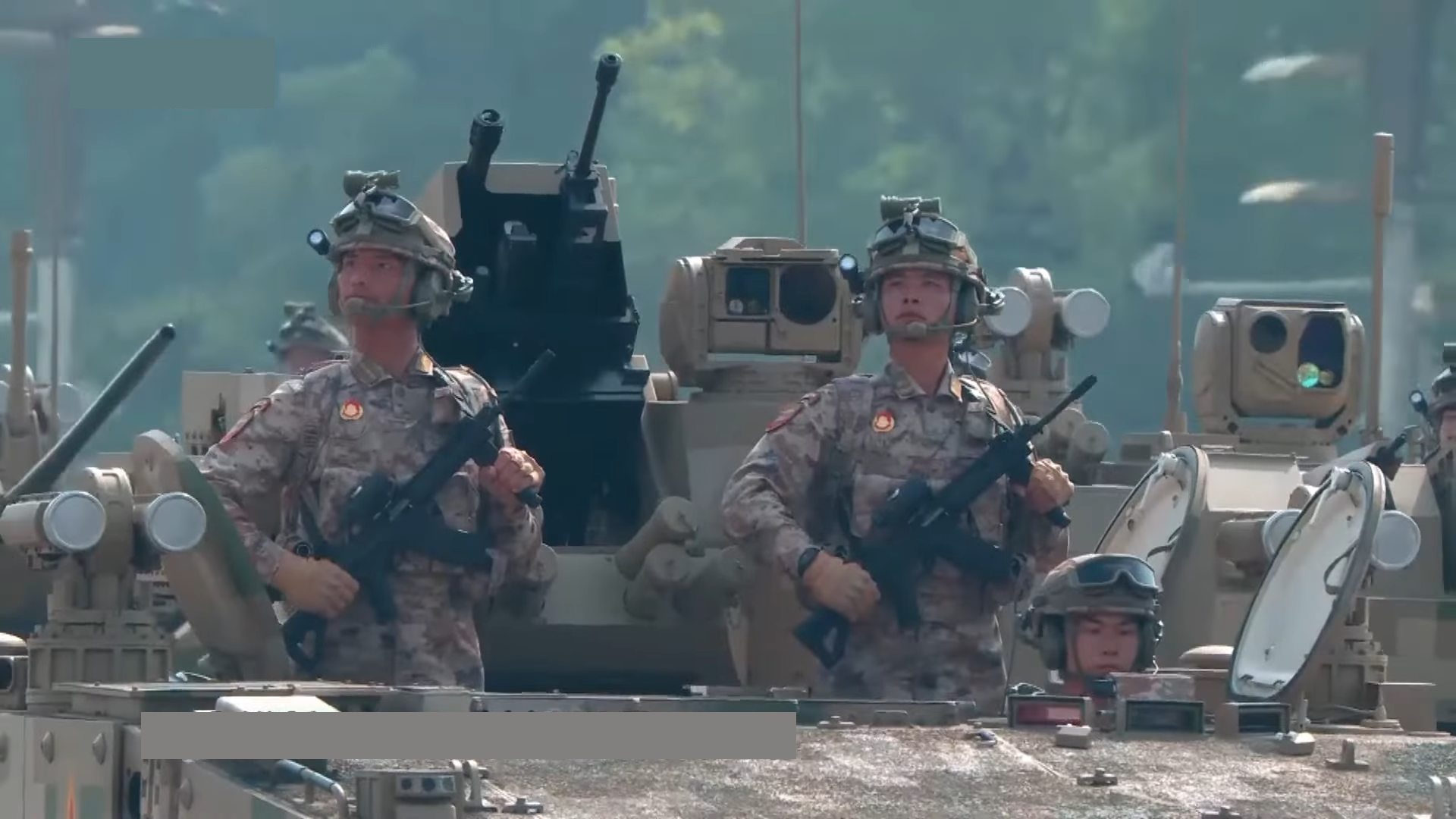
PLAAF Airborne Corps at the 2025 China Victory Day Parade

The Airborne Corps were crucial in disaster relief after the 2008 Sichuan Earthquake, when on May 14, 2008, 15 airborne corps paratroopers parachuted into Mao County, which was inaccessible due to the earthquake, providing crucial initial aid, and setting up 6 landing zones in Wenchuan and Mao Counties for more airborne corps soldiers to be deployed.

The 15 paratroopers, consisting of Liu Wenhui, Li Yushan, Wang Lei, Zhao Haidong, Liu Zhibao, Lei Zhisheng, Yin Yuan, Zhao Sifang, Wang Junwei, Ren Tao, Li Zhenbo, Yu Yabin, Guo Longshuai, Li Yajun and Xiang Haibo, were nicknamed the "15 warriors of the Airborne Corps" (空降十五勇士), gained significant coverage on Chinese media. It was the first time the airborne corps completed a parachute jump with no information on the weather, no ground markings or communications on the ground.

=== Modern developments ===
The "Thunder Gods" special forces unit was established on September 30, 2011.

In April 2017, the corps was renamed as the Airborne Corps. The subordinate divisions were disbanded, and the six regiments previously subordinated to the divisions were upgraded to brigades.

In 2018, the corps was reorganized to integrate combined arms units at the brigade level. It participated in the PLAAF's annual "Red Sword" exercise for the first time that year; "Red Sword" emphasizes force-on-force confrontations.

Since its establishment in 1950, over 17,000 Airborne Corps soldiers have been killed in action.

In 2023 and 2024, Chinese officials visited Russia to evaluate and acquire Russian equipment to strengthen the PLAAF Airborne Corps.

== Training ==
Airborne officers receive cadet training at the Army Special Operations Academy in Guilin (while keeping their separate Air Force status). After graduation they receive further training at the airborne corps training base.

Until 1999, cadet training was done at PLA Army colleges. From 1999, this was done at the Guilin Air Force College, which was founded as an antiaircraft artillery school in the 1950s; the named changed to the PLAAF Airborne Troop College in 2001. Reductions to military colleges closed the Airborne Troop College in 2017, and it was replaced by the training base.

Exercises since 2018 have had an increased focus on sophistication and realism.

== Organization ==
=== Pre-2017 organization ===
The 15th Airborne Corps consisted of:

- 43rd Division; based in Kaifeng, Henan
  - 127th, 128th, 129th Regiments; artillery regiment
- 44th Division; based in Guangshui, Hubei
  - 130th, 131st Regiments; artillery regiment
- 45th Division; based in Huangpi, Hubei
  - 132nd, 133rd, 134th Regiments; artillery regiment

It also included a special forces brigade, a helicopter brigade, and various support units.

=== Post-2017 organization ===
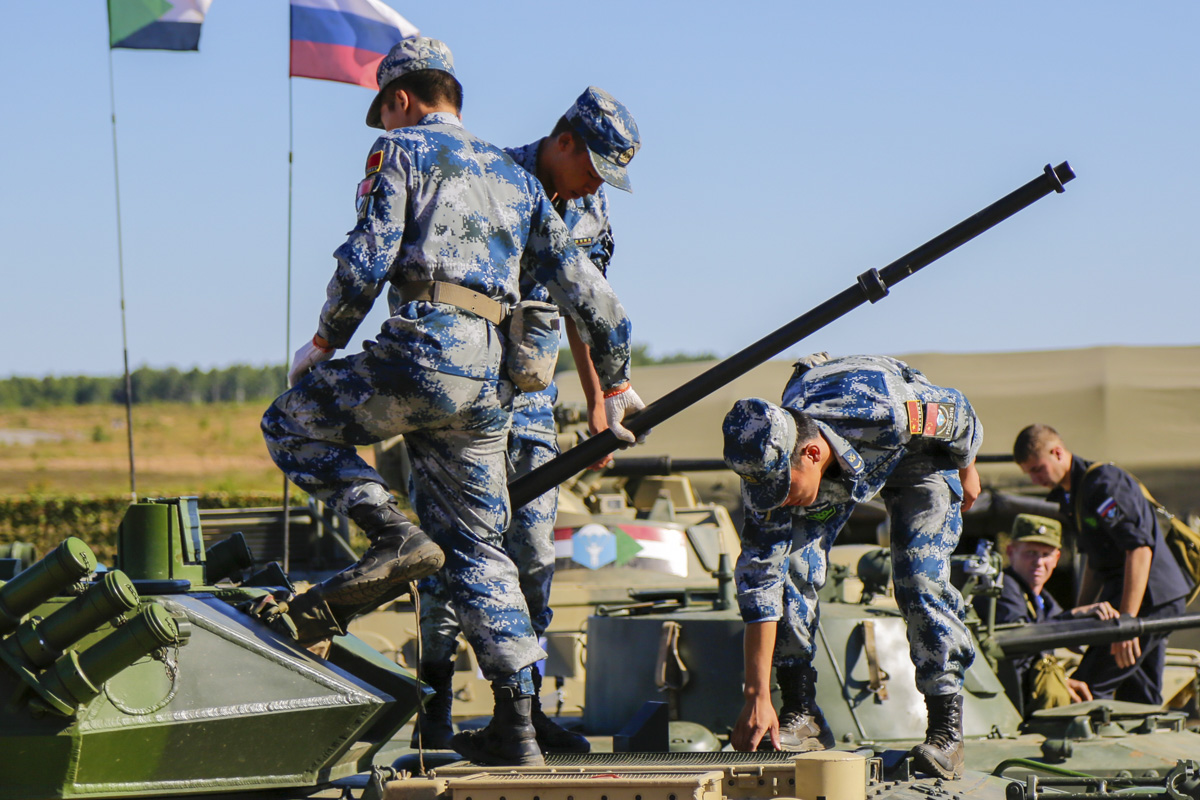
Airborne troops in 2018.

The 2017 reforms upgraded most of the regiments to brigades and subordinated them directly to the corps. The divisions, and the 129th and 132nd Regiments, were abolished.

- 127th Airborne Brigade; located in the Southern Theater Command
- 128th Airborne Brigade; located in the Western Theater Command
- 130th Airborne Brigade
- 131st Airborne Brigade
- 133rd Airborne Brigade; located in the Northern Theater Command
- 134th Airborne Brigade; located in the Eastern Theater Command

According to a 2024 Taiwan military publication, the 127th, 128th and 130th Airborne Brigades are air assault brigades. In 2025, the International Institute of Strategic Studies listed the corps as having five airborne and one air assault brigades.

Each airborne brigade has four combined arms battalions, an artillery battalion, a support battalion, an anti-air battalion and a logistics battalion. Airborne brigades are distributed among the theater commands. The Airborne Corps has peacetime control; they do not belong to theater command air forces. Theater commands have wartime control.

The special forces brigade became a special operations brigade, and included the "Thunder Gods". (MUCD 95848.) The helicopter brigade and shipping regiment became an aviation transport brigade. Various support units were consolidated into a support brigade.

The teaching brigade from the disbanded 44th Division and the driver training regiment were transferred to the Guilin Airborne Academy.

== Culture ==
The Airborne Corps' motto roughly translates to "I am the first to be deployed, when I am deployed I will win" (Chinese: 首战用我，用我必胜).

== Equipment ==
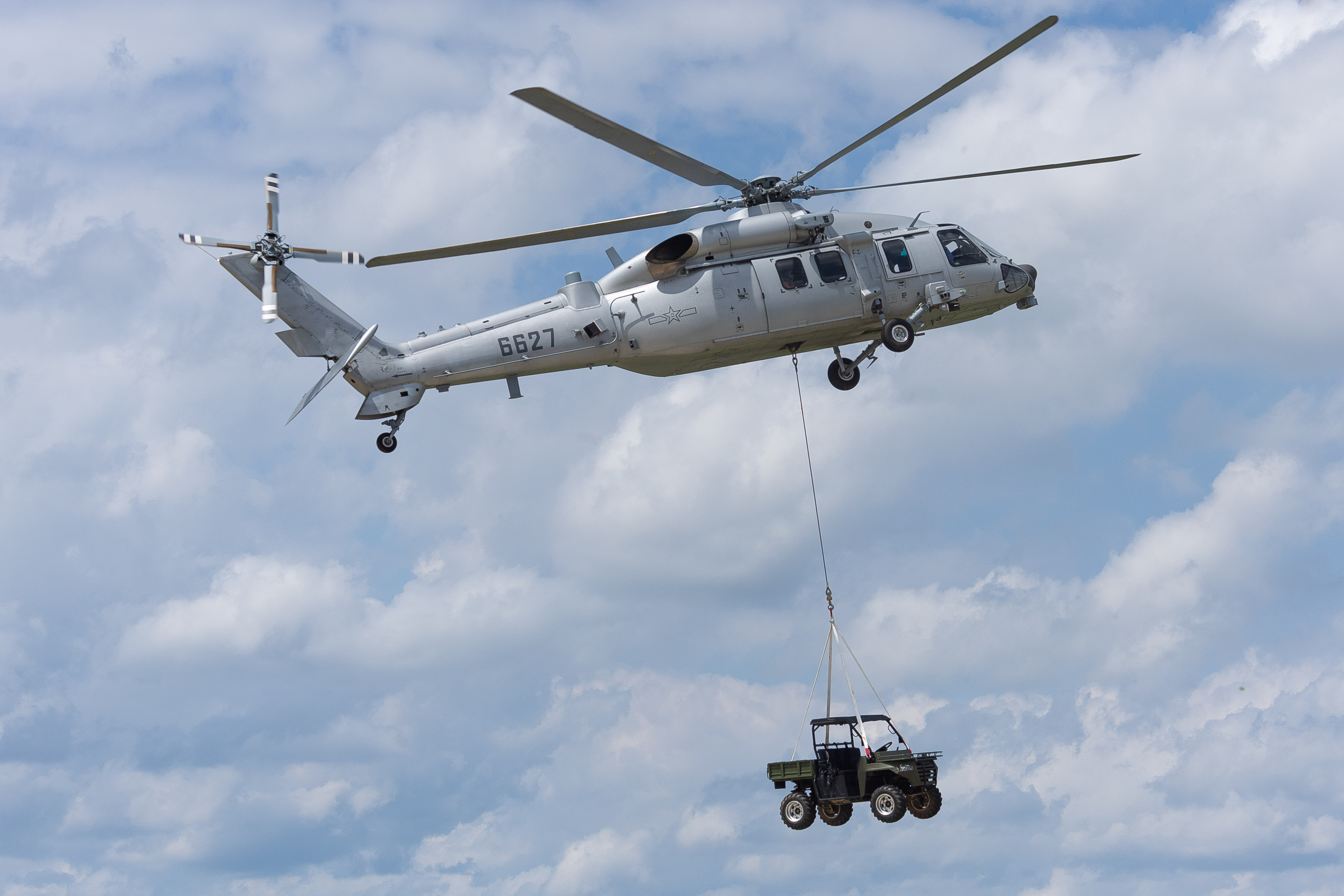
An Airborne Corps Z-20KA slingloading a CS/VP11 ATV.

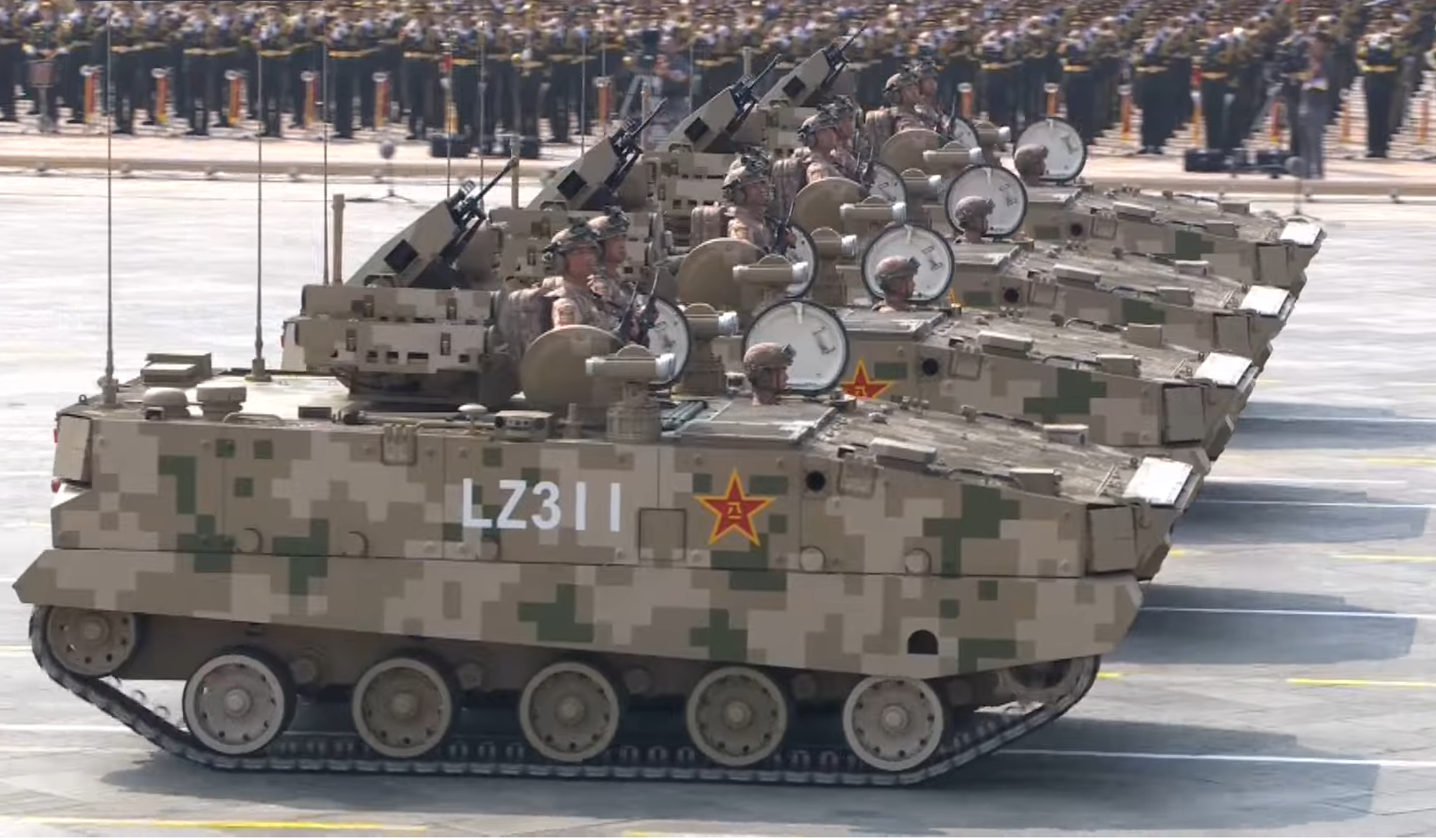
PLAAF Airborne Corps armored vehicles

The corps was a predominantly light infantry force to the late-2000s, and described as a "'traditional motorized force' that emphasized parachuting operations" prior to 2018. A helicopter unit was created in 2005, and expanded to a regiment in 2012. In the 2010s, the corps developed capabilities for mechanized warfare.

The corps has limited organic airlift mainly in the form of light- and medium-transport military transport aircraft. Large-scale airlifts require PLAAF transport aircraft. Prior to 2016, the PLAAF's Il-76 fleet was sufficient to move one airborne division across China at time. From 2016, capacity was augmented by the Xi'an Y-20. By 2022, there were 31 Y-20s and 20 Il-76s.

Name	Origin	Type	Variant	In service	Notes
Armoured fighting vehicles
ZBD-03	China	Infantry fighting vehicle Command vehicle	ZBD-03 ZZZ-03	180 4	
CS/VN3	China	Infantry mobility vehicle			Modified variant
SX-1	China	Infantry mobility vehicle			
Artillery/anti-tank
PL-96	China	Towed artillery		~54	
PH-63	China	Towed artillery		~54	
82 mm mortar	China	Mortar		Some	
100 mm mortar	China	Mortar		54	
HJ-9	China	Anti-tank guided missile		Some	Self-propelled
Helicopters
Z-8KA	China	CSAR		8	
Z-9WZ	China	Multirole		12	
WZ-10K	China	Attack helicopter		8	
Z-20K	China	Medium transport		6	
Transport
Y-8	China	Tactical airlift		6	
Y-7	China	Light transport		2	
Y-12D	China	Light transport		12	
Y-5	China	Light transport		20	
Air defense
QW-1	China	Surface-to-air missile			
PG-87	China	Anti-aircraft gun		54	

== Awards ==
Chinese paratroopers have participated in the International Army Games several times. They ranked first in the Airborne Platoon competition in 2015 and 2017.

== Notable personnel ==
- Huang Jiguang
- Qiu Shaoyun

== See also ==
- Republic of China Army Aviation and Special Forces Command
- People's Liberation Army Navy Marine Corps
- People's Liberation Army special operations forces
- Russian Airborne Forces
- 1st Airborne Brigade (Japan)

== Sources ==
- Allen, Kenneth W. (August 29, 2023). "Current Overview of the PLA Air Force's Organizational Structure" (PDF). Center for Intelligence Research and Analysis.
- Allen, Kenneth W.; Garafola, Cristina L. (April 12, 2021). 70 Years of the PLA Air Force. China Aerospace Studies Institute. ISBN 979-8-724860-88-8.
- Garafola, Cristina L. (March 2022). "The PLA Airborne Corps in a Joint Island Landing Campaign". China Maritime Report (19). China Maritime Studies Institute.
- International Institute for Strategic Studies (2024). The Military Balance 2024. London, England: Routledge. ISBN 9781032780047.
- International Institute for Strategic Studies, ed. (2025). The Military Balance 2025. London: Routledge. p. 246. ISBN 978-1-041-04967-8.
- 謝游麟 (February 2024). "探討中國大陸空軍空降兵之發展". 空軍學術雙月刊 (698). Ministry of National Defense of the Republic of China.
- 林相涵; 鍾億儒 (September 2021). "共軍空降旅新式裝備編成對我防衛作戰之影響─以 CS/VN3 裝甲車為例" (PDF). 裝甲兵季刊第 [Armor Quarterly] (261). Ministry of National Defense of the Republic of China.
