= 11th Corps (People's Republic of China) =

Former Chinese military unit

11th Corps (1949–52); 11th Army Corps (1969–85)
- Active: 1949.3–1950.7; 1951.1–1952.10; 1969.11–1985.12
- Country: China
- Allegiance: Chinese Communist Party
- Branch: People's Liberation Army Ground Force
- Part of: Kunming Military Region
- Garrison/HQ: Dali, Yunnan
- Engagements: Chinese Civil War; Sino-Vietnamese War

The 11th Corps (later the 11th Army Corps) (Chinese: 第11军) was a military formation of the Chinese People's Liberation Army. It was active from 1949 to 1952, with a six month break; and from 1969 to the end of 1985. It is currently inactive. In 1979 the corps took part in the Sino-Vietnamese War. In 1984 it again fought in Vietnam. It was stationed in the Kunming Military Region.

== First Formation ==
The 11th Corps was activated on March 1, 1949, from the 3rd Column, Zhongyuan Field Army. In March–December 1949 it was part of Ch'en Tsi-Lien's 3rd Army of the Second Field Army. The Corps was composed of the 31st Division, 32nd Division and 33rd Division. During the Chinese Civil War its commander was Chen Jiagui, and its political commissar was Zhang Qi.

In early 1950 the corps was stationed in eastern Sichuan Province. During its deployment in Sichuan, the corps supported 18th Corps' invasion of Tibet. As the Civil War wound down, the corps was inactivated in July 1950. Its headquarters was transferred to the Navy's control and converted at Qingdao Naval Base into what is now the North Sea Fleet.

== 2nd Formation ==
In January 1951, the 31st Division was detached and transferred to 12th Corps control, which later moved into Korea as a part of the People's Volunteer Army to support North Korea during the Korean War.

In March, the 32nd and 33rd Divisions moved to Langfang, Hebei. In July, 11th Corps was reactivated from 32nd, 33rd and 182nd Divisions.

The unit was a reserve formation for the People's Volunteer Army, but it never deployed into the Korean Peninsula. In October 1952 the corps was inactivated. The corps' headquarters was transferred to the Air Force's control and converted to Headquarters, 5th Air Force Corps. The 32nd Division was transferred to 16th Corps' control. The 33rd Division was deployed into Korea; after 1954 the division was attached to 26th Corps. The 182nd Division was converted into the 8th Railway Engineer Division.

== 3rd Formation ==
On November 14, 1969, the 11th Army Corps (Chinese: 陆军第11军) was activated in Dali, Yunnan. The corps was composed of the 31st and 32nd Army Divisions, making it a rare example of a "Reduced Army Corps", which was composed of two, instead of three, divisions. An artillery regiment and an anti-aircraft artillery regiment were also attached.

In May 1976, the Independent Tank Regiment of Kunming Military Region, formerly the 4th Independent Tank Regiment of Beijing Military Region, was attached to the corps.

=== Sino-Vietnamese War ===
In 1979 the corps took part in the Sino-Vietnamese War. During the conflict the corps was strengthened by taking the Independent Division of Yunnan Provincial Military Region under command; in May 1979, this division was renamed 33rd Army Division. 32nd Army Division was temporarily detached from the corps to form the reserve force of Kunming Military Region.

The main force of 11th Army Corps, without its 32nd Army Division and its tank regiment, thrust 34 kilometres (21 mi) into Vietnamese territory in the 55-day-long campaign. The division spent 22 days outside China and claimed to have destroyed one Vietnamese regiment and three battalions and captured Phong Thổ. The corps also claimed to have inflicted 2,899 casualties and taken 58 prisoners

From April 4–29, 1984, 11th Army Corps was again in Vietnam and took part in the Battle of Zheyinshan. During its deployment, the corps claimed to have inflicted 500 casualties on the Vietnamese forces and to have captured 18 prisoners of war and 19 artillery pieces.

From August 4 to December 9, 1984, 11th Army Corps took part in the Battle of Laoshan. During its deployment, the corps claimed 1,698 killed and one captured.

=== Disbandment ===
In December 1985 the corps was disbanded. 31st Army Division was transferred to 14th Army's control as 31st Motorized Infantry Division, a 'southern motorized infantry division'. 32nd Army Division was converted to 2nd Garrison Division of Chengdu Military Region, which was disbanded in 1992. 33rd Army Division was disbanded and merged with 65th Artillery Division as the anti-aircraft artillery brigade attached to 14th Army. The corps' tank regiment was merged with 14th Army Corps existing tank brigade.

== Components ==
Before its disbandment the army corps was composed of:

- 31st Army Division
  - 91st Infantry Regiment
  - 92nd Infantry Regiment
  - 93rd Infantry Regiment
  - Artillery Regiment
- 32nd Army Division
  - 94th Infantry Regiment
  - 95th Infantry Regiment
  - 96th Infantry Regiment
  - Artillery Regiment
- 33rd Army Division
  - 97th Infantry Regiment
  - 98th Infantry Regiment
  - 99th Infantry Regiment
  - Artillery Regiment
- Tank Regiment
- Artillery Regiment
- Anti-Aircraft Artillery Regiment
