= Project Blue Sword-B =

1986 conflict between China and Vietnam

- Part of the Sino-Vietnamese conflicts (1979–1991)
Date	14 October 1986
Location	Songhu Ling, Wenshan County, Yunnan, China
Result	Chinese victory

Belligerents
China	Vietnam

Commanders and leaders
(China) Chang Wanquan (Deputy Commander of 139th ID ) (China) Ma Quanbin (WIA) (1st commando team leader) (China) Qi Zhenwu † (2nd commando team leader)	(Vietnam) General Vũ Lập (Vietnam) Brigadier general Đỗ Thanh Trì (313th division commander)

Units involved
People's Liberation Army: 5th Company, 416th Infantry Regiment; Electronic Countermeasures Detachment; 56 artillery batteries	Vietnam People's Army: 1st Battalion, 122nd Regiment, 313th Division; 313th Division Artillery Group; 168th Artillery Brigade; 457th Artillery Regiment; 150th Artillery Regiment

Strength
207	500+

Casualties and losses
22 killed 56 wounded	304 casualties

On 14 October 1986, the Lanzhou Military Region of the Chinese People's Liberation Army (PLA) launched a raid operation called the Project Blue Sword-B (Chinese: 蓝剑-B计划) or the Operation Blue Sword-B (Chinese: 蓝剑-B行动) during the Sino-Vietnamese conflicts to capture several Vietnamese People's Army (VPA) strongholds near Lao Shan.

== Background ==
After the 1984 Battle of Laoshan, China decided to conduct training and practical exploration in the form of rotating the major military regions into the Laoshan area for defensive operations. from 30 April 1986, the Lanzhou Military Region began to take over the Yunnan Front Command, assuming the task of defensive operations in Laoshan.

=== Chinese preparations ===
On 30 April 1986 troops belonging to the Lanzhou Military Region entered the front line of Laoshan to take over the defence of the Jinan Military Region. The 47th Army Group Commander Qian Shugen selected the 604th position and the 968th high ground as the main targets during the combat meeting. The 11th Army of Kunming Military Region, the First Army of Nanjing Military Region and the 67th Army of Jinan Military Region had successfully attacked the 968th high ground three times and achieved certain results. Highland 968 was one of the more contested areas for both sides and the PAVN were quite sensitive to the defensive mentality. The choice of this area as the target for the first strike had the significance of dampening the morale of the PAVN and maintaining military pressure, while also allowing for initial battle practice on more familiar terrain. In addition, unlike the previous rotations by the Kunming, Nanjing and Jinan Military Districts, the Lanzhou Military Region came to Yunnan with not only infantry and artillery, but also an electronic countermeasures battalion directly under the military district. This was the first time that the PLA's electronic countermeasures soldiers were deployed to the front line of combat.

To improve the PLA's defensive posture, the 47th Army Group's military headquarters resolved to take the 139th Division's 416th Regiment's 5 companies (5 companies of special merit) to strengthen the 6 companies' 3 platoons, the regiment's reconnaissance platoon, the regiment's engineer company's ground-burst platoon, and the division's ground-burst company's 2 platoons, with the support and cooperation of the artillery, electronic countermeasures section (detachment), and feint detachment, relying on forward positions, choose a favorable time to take a combination of frontal attacks and flank penetration, small formations, multiple waves, and The tactical means of continuous attack, fighting and suppressing at the same time, quick and total annihilation, captured the 604th position and 968th high ground, completely annihilated the defending enemy, destroyed the fortifications, waited for the opportunity to capture prisoners, collected the spoils of war and withdrew as ordered.

At the same time the electronic countermeasures detachment invested a total of 5 ultra-shortwave 100-watt jammers, eight 40-watt jammers, twelve S207 receivers, 1 monitoring panorama receiver, 4 sets of shortwave 1600-watt jammers, 2 400-watt jammers, two 150-watt jammers, 3 bilateral band listening vehicles, 1 set of IBM PC/XT microcomputers; 171 troops (including 52 cadres and 119 soldiers) were invested. The unit was composed of 2 forward sub-groups, 1 basic group and 1 rear group. The group occupied 11 positions, including Basho Ping, No. 10 and 1175.4 heights in the direction of Balihe East Mountain, Mahei, No. 52, No. 50 and No. 49 positions, Tzhuiba, Lushui-dong, Anle and Xialaiyuan in the direction of Laoshan Mountain. Personnel of the Group Army Electronic Countermeasures Command Group (Military Region Electronic Countermeasures Working Group) entered the Group Army Command Post and 139th Division Forward Command Post and Jamming Group Command Post respectively.

=== Vietnamese preparations ===
In the 12 km frontage and 10 km depth in front of Laoshan and Bailihe East Mountain, the PAVN deployed 2 infantry divisions, 1 artillery brigade, 3 artillery regiments and 1 secret service regiment. 604 positions, 968 heights and diamond positions were defended by 1 battalion of 122 regiment of 313 division of the PAVN (missing 3 platoons). Before the war, the Vietnamese radio stations were out of contact normally, and the PLA detected and controlled 170 radio communication networks (special) in the enemy's front and shallow depths.

== Battle ==
The attack was originally planned for the early hours of 14 October, when the two heights were to be taken quickly by surprise. However, in the early hours of the morning, the battle area was covered in fog, but the start of the battle had to be postponed until the fog cleared to get a clear shot. At noon, the clouds cleared and the position was revealed. At this point it was no longer possible to carry out a sneak attack, and the command decisively changed its resolve from a sneak attack to a strong attack, after which the order was given to prepare the artillery fire.

At 04:30 on 14 October, the assault team occupied the starting position for the attack; at 0559, the assault detachment advanced to the 603rd high ground and occupied the starting position for the impact, and the penetration detachment advanced to the east side of the 993rd high ground to stand by. 1259; the PLA shelled the 305th, 395th and 405th high ground in the direction of the feint, and one minute later, the infantry network of the 818th Regiment of the 314th Division of the PAVN urgently went out of joint, and the first PLA forward The PLA's first forward jamming sub-group, the Ma Hey position, intermittently jammed it as planned. When "timed control", the jamming pattern was "murmur" and "900 Hz sine wave"; when "manually controlled", the jamming pattern was "murmur" and "900 Hz sine wave". When "manually controlled", the jamming pattern was "voice FM" and "900 Hz sine wave".

At 1303 hours the PLA began direct fire preparations against targets such as Position 604, Highland 968 and adjacent positions, destroying the PAVN defences at Position 604, Highland 968 and the PAVN fortifications, fire points and mortar positions in the area of Highland 1058 and 832, and carrying out direct fire on the southern and south-eastern side of Position 604, Highland 968, the traffic trenches and between Position 605 and Highland 832 to stop the PAVN from contracting and escaping. At the same time, the Barrier Breakers moved forward quickly under cover of artillery fire and opened up passages in minefields and obstacles with rocket blasters. The PLA jamming group, in addition to leaving a set of 40-watt jammers to continue to hold the 818th Regiment for jamming, concentrated all jamming forces and, according to the enemy station's communication situation, successively jammed the ultra-short-wave and short-wave nets (special) of the 313th Division's fire group, the 168th Artillery Brigade's battalions' observation posts, the 150th Artillery Regiment, the 457th Artillery Regiment and other units under the Second Military Region's artillery finger. A strong suppressive jamming was carried out. The jamming method is "manual keying". Jamming style: 100 watt jammers are "noise FM" and 40 watt jammers are "noise FM".

=== Assaulting the Vietnamese position ===
At 1330 hours onwards PLA artillery fire, from sabotage fire to suppression fire, the main force of the assault team to 604 positions, 968 high local direction to launch attacks. At the same time the electronic countermeasures Laoshan 52 and 49 positions each jamming station (group) continued to carry out suppressive jamming on the enemy 122nd regiment to battalion and 1st battalion to company command network. 1336 hours, the PLA commando force captured the surface position of 604 position and started to search and fight holes. According to the PLA electronic countermeasures detachment's records, the PAVN made several attempts to make contact with forward units during this period, but to no avail: 13:19: the enemy 122nd regiment to which it belonged: "The enemy is firing at ...... ...... The order ......" was drowned out by the jamming; 13:22: the enemy 168th Artillery Brigade 1st Battalion cursed at the gun watch: "...... you sent the report, why can't I hear ...... fuck, China put jamming, ......"

The PLA infantry first assault team quickly attacked, rushing through the minefield via the passageway straight to the 604th position. Meanwhile, the 416th Regiment 82nd Mortar Company implemented escort fire to cover the infantry impact. The 1st Commando's deputy leader, Luo Buji, led the team to the front and blew up three consecutive PAVN fire points, quickly breaking through to the front of position 604. The whole team fought cleanly and took only seven minutes to occupy the surface position. It then immediately moved on to search for PAVN shelters and cantonment holes, and covered the 2nd Commando attack with firepower.

After the First Commando broke through the PAVN forward positions, the Second Commando, under the command of Captain Qi Zhenwu, overtook the First Commando and charged towards the 968th high ground. The artillery also quickly turned to suppress the PAVN mortars on the south side of the 832 and 1058 heights and in the shallow depths, and to carry out surveillance fire on the 605, 606, 607 and 608 positions and the remaining Vietnamese fire points on the 832 and 1058 heights. Soon after the second assault team received heavy machine-gun fire from the Vietnamese concealed fire points, the advance was blocked. The first commando, Gu Jinhai, under the cover of fire from his comrade Bi Dongyu, quickly approached the PAVN fire point, grabbed the dead end of the PAVN machine gun fire and threw a number of grenades in succession to blow it up, clearing the way for the second commando to advance. The second assault team ignored the PAVN airbursts and artillery fire, and under the cover of the artillery and friendly fire, they stormed the main peak of 968 high ground in only 10 minutes, and then moved on to search and fight for holes. At the same time, two combat teams occupied the southeast side of the 968th high ground with favorable terrain, forming an internal and external front to monitor the PAVN.

=== Vietnamese counterattack ===
Starting at 1352 hours, the PAVN organized squad and group size troops to launch two counter-impacts along 832 high ground and 605th position to 968 high ground. Qi Zhenwu commanded two combat teams of the second assault team to rely on favourable terrain to launch fire and put the enemy close to them to kill and injure them violently. The command also quickly organised 7 artillery companies to carry out blocking fire on 832 heights and 605 positions respectively, while the rest of the artillery increased their firepower to suppress the PAVN mortars in the shallow depths and support the infantry in fighting the enemy counter-attacks. With the support of artillery fire, the second assault team repelled four counter-attacks by the PAVN.

At the same time, the assault team that had taken position 604 and 968 high ground accelerated the pace of searching and fighting for holes. The remnants of the PAVN on the heights were hiding in shelters and cantonment holes and resisting, and there were also some remaining dark fire points that suddenly resurrected. Coupled with the fact that the PAVN artillery fire in the deep areas kept hitting the two heights incessantly, the search and destroy battle was brutal and the commandos suffered a lot of casualties. At position 604, commandos Gu Jinhai and Bi Dongyu were searching ahead when a grenade was suddenly thrown from a very concealed cantonment hole nearby. In the nick of time, Gu Jinhai quickly pushed Bi Dongyu to the ground, while he himself was wounded in five places, including his head, chest and right arm. Other commandos hurriedly bandaged Gu Jinhai's wounds and prepared to send him down to the position, but he resolutely refused and continued to fight. At that moment, a PAVN shell flew in, wounding both Gu Jinhai and Captain Ma Quanbin. Ma Quanbin was hit in the jaw with shrapnel, his jaw was dislocated and he was shot in several places. Gu Jinhai's steel helmet was pierced by shrapnel and his head was bleeding like water. When his comrades around him were about to send Gu Jinhai down to the position again, he shouted with force, "Save the captain first!" This shocking scene was filmed by a reporter at the time and was once broadcast on the news.

On high ground 968, after commanding the second assault team to repel the PAVN's counter-attack, Qi Zhenwu led his men to continue searching the position hole by hole for the remnants of the enemy. From the beginning of the assault he was in the front, fighting hard, and by himself he successively killed eight of the enemy. The PLA used grenades, dynamite packs and flamethrowers to attack the PAVN troops hiding in sheltered fortifications and cantonment holes, combining hitting, bombing, burning and searching to clear out the remnants of the enemy point by point. At 14:14, the remaining VPA in position 604 and on high ground 968 were completely destroyed.

=== Chinese retreat ===
After receiving the battle report, the command ordered the two assault teams to retreat immediately after destroying the PAVN fortifications on the positions. At the same time, they organised four artillery companies and the regiment's direct fire detachment to block fire between positions 832 and 605, as well as the south side of 968 and all sections of the traffic trench from the prismatic position to 968 to prevent the PAVN from following them and to cover the retreat of the assault teams. After blowing up the Vietnamese caves, shelters and other fortifications in their positions, the First and Second Commandos began to retreat with the captured weapons and supplies, as well as the wounded, prisoners and the remains of martyrs. On the way back, the exasperated PAVN used direct fire to chase the assault team. To ensure the safety of the escorted prisoners, the first assault team's deputy captain, Luo Buji, jumped on the prisoners, but himself was hit by four pieces of shrapnel, pierced his waist and chest, and died. The second assault team leader Qi Zhenwu ordered his teammates to withdraw first, he insisted on checking the position before catching up with the team. When retreating to the front of the 604 position, it came under fire from the PAVN again.

By 1558 hours, the assault team all withdrew to the original starting position. The command again ordered some of the artillery to switch to surveillance fire and the rest to mark targets for surveillance.

At 2225 hours, about one Vietnamese company assembled at position 605 and stood by to prepare for a counterattack on high ground 968. The command immediately organised seven artillery companies to carry out a surprise fire attack on the PAVN in the assembly area at 2230–45 hours, killing and wounding one of them before they retreated.

== Aftermath ==
The battle was the first offensive battle of the Lanzhou Military Region's turn against the Vietnamese, suppressing the VPA's firepower and communications with absolute artillery superiority and electronic jamming capabilities, allowing the infantry detachment to complete the assault with far fewer troops than the defending side.

=== Artillery ===
Following the lessons of the 1979 Sino-Vietnamese War, the PLA has since the beginning of the Battle of Laoshan placed great emphasis and relied on artillery to reduce casualties by reducing the time infantry had to spend in short-range encounters with the enemy, with remarkable results. In this operation, the PLA mobilized 56 artillery batteries with a total of 336 assorted guns to support the attack of a reinforced company, which was considered by some reports as "finally fighting a broad battle".

=== Electronic warfare ===
The battle was also the first actual combat case in which the People's Liberation Army Electronic Warfare Troops were made public, and since then the People's Liberation Army has begun to pay more attention to the development of electronic warfare units. After the war, the Electronic Countermeasures Radar Division of the Lanzhou Military Region Communications Department concluded in the battle case that.

(a) solid and adequate pre-war preparations, to achieve a solid foundation for the first battle. Good use of soldiers, prudent first battle, not to fight unprepared battles, not to fight unsure of the battle. Before the war, the battalion carefully organized before the battle of surprise training, simulation training and supplementary reconnaissance, and a variety of service security preparations, and focus on simulation training in the optimization of combat programs. The practice has proved that before the war to pay the sweat, pay enough "tuition", when the war can be less bloodshed, to deliver the ideal "answer sheet".

(The actual fact is that the particulars of the actuals are not really a lot. The first thing you need to do is to take advantage of the power of electronic countermeasures by jamming groups to form the overall strike capability. For this reason, we – are in the careful formulation of a synergy program based on direct participation in the synthetic army combat command, and sending a liaison to the forward command post, to grasp the battlefield dynamics, improve the timeliness and relevance of synergy and cooperation, the second is to cultivate electronic countermeasures department (sub) team commanders of synergy awareness, intelligence awareness, improve the consciousness and initiative of synergy and cooperation. So, in the whole process of the battle, not only properly solve the contradiction between electronic countermeasures and communication, and intelligence, but also do the "soft, hard" kill coordination – consistent, electronic attack and strike combat close cooperation. So that the electronic countermeasures show great power.

(C) reasonable electronic countermeasures deployment is to play electronic countermeasures weapon effectiveness of the premise. To give full play to the effectiveness of electronic countermeasures, the battalion for the enemy's combat formation, position formation and command (observation) system and battlefield terrain conditions and other factors, taking into account the number of our electronic countermeasures, performance, communications, and service security capabilities and the survival conditions of the people anon factors, take the combination of small and large, far and near, front and side, high and low, ultra-short wave and short wave combination of methods, appropriate

(D) flexible tactical means is to seize the initiative of communication confrontation "magic weapon". The company's main goal is to provide a comprehensive range of services to the public. This time, I jammed troops against the enemy to take a variety of electronic defense measures, to take a "sound east to west", "static braking", "close to the system close to" and other tactical means, to achieve The enemy's electronic defensive measures The enemy's 818th Infantry Regiment, which was interfered with by my feint, panicked and misrepresented the battle; the enemy's 168th Artillery Brigade, 457th Artillery Regiment, and 150th Artillery Regiment, which were interfered with by my focus, had difficulty in giving firing orders in time and basically did not pose a threat to our army's mountain attack operations.

— Lanzhou Military Region Communications Department Electronic Countermeasures Radar Division, "LJ-B Plan" Communications Countermeasures Battle Example,

=== Live TV streaming ===
A film crew led by Wang Hong, a field photographer, followed the assault team throughout the battle, taking photographs and video from so close that Wang Hong himself was shot and wounded. Photographs and videos of the operation were widely circulated and the battle is considered to be the first "People's Liberation Army combat operation to be televised live".
