= 131st Division =

In military terms, 131st Division or 131st Infantry Division may refer to:

- 131st Division (1st Formation) (People's Republic of China), 1948–1953
- 131st Division (2nd Formation) (People's Republic of China), 1964–1985
- 131st Infantry Division (Wehrmacht), Germany
- 131st Division (Imperial Japanese Army)
- 131st Armored Division "Centauro", Italian Army, World War II
- 131st Guards Motor Rifle Division, Russia, earlier the 131st Guards Machine-Gun Artillery Division
- 131st Motor Rifle Division, Soviet Union
- 131st Rifle Division, Soviet Union

== See also ==
- List of military divisions by number
- 131st Brigade (disambiguation)
- 131st Regiment (disambiguation)
- 131st Squadron (disambiguation)
- 131st (disambiguation)
