= 122nd Division (People's Republic of China) =

Former Chinese military unit

122nd Division (1948–52) 122nd Infantry Division (1952-60) 122nd Army Division (1960-85)
- Active: 1948.11 - 1985
- Country: People's Republic of China
- Branch: People's Liberation Army
- Type: Division
- Role: Infantry
- Part of: 41st Army Corps
- Garrison/HQ: Chikan District, Guangdong
- Engagements: Chinese Civil War, Vietnam War

The 122nd Division (Chinese: 第122师) was created in November 1948 under the Regulation of the Redesignations of All Organizations and Units of the Army, issued by Central Military Commission on November 1, 1948, basing on the 11th Division, 4th Column of PLA Fourth Field Army. Its history could be trace to 6th Division of Shandong Military District, formed in August 1945.

The division was a part of 41st Corps. Under the flag of 122nd the division took part in several major battles during the Chinese Civil War, including the Laoshen and Pingjin Campaign. The division was composed of 364th, 365th and 366th Infantry Regiments.

In October 1952, 366th Infantry Regiment detached from the division and filled into 45th Division fighting in the bloody Battle of Triangle Hill. 392nd Infantry Regiment from 131st Division attached and redesignated as the new 366th Infantry Regiment.

In April 1953 502nd Artillery Regiment activated. By then the division was composed of:

- 366th Infantry Regiment;
- 367th Infantry Regiment;
- 368th Infantry Regiment;
- 502nd Artillery Regiment.

In July 1953, the division took part in the Dongshan Island Campaign,

In April 1960 the division was renamed as 122nd Army Division.

In 1962 the division was catalogued as a "small division".

In 1969, 502nd Artillery Regiment was renamed as Artillery Regiment, 122nd Army Division.

In February 1979, the division took part in the Sino-Vietnam War. During the conflict the division inflicted 2730 casualties to confronting PAVN units.

In 1985 the division was disbanded. 364th Infantry Regiment was transferred to 121st Infantry Division.
