= 31st Motorized Infantry Division (People's Republic of China) =

49th Infantry Division (1952–60) 49th Army Division (1960-69) 31st Army Division (1969-85) 31st Motorized Infantry Division (1985-2013) 31st Mechanized Infantry Brigade (2013-2017) 31st Heavy Combined Arms Brigade (2017-)
- Active: 1952.3-
- Country: China
- Allegiance: Chinese Communist Party
- Branch: Southern Theater Command Ground Force
- Type: Combined Arms
- Size: Brigade
- Part of: 75th Group Army
- Garrison/HQ: Dali, Yunnan
- Engagements: Vietnam War, Sino-Vietnamese War

The 49th Infantry Division (Chinese: 步兵第49师) was a division of the Chinese People's Liberation Army. It was formed in March 1952 and in August designated as a light division of the national defense force. It was the second PRC infantry division numbered 49; the previous 49th Division had been disestablished in 1950–51.

The division was organized from units and detachments of the 5th Army Group left in Guizhou province.

The division was composed of:

- 145th Infantry Regiment;
- 146th Infantry Regiment (former 137th);
- 147th Infantry Regiment (former 141st);
- 307th Artillery Regiment.

From April 1955 the division was put under the Kunming Military Region's control.

From June 1957 the division was transferred to the Chengdu Military Region's control, but the division returned to the Kunming MR in May 1958.

From April 1960 the division was renamed as the 49th Army Division (Chinese: 陆军第49师).

From August 1967 to 1968, Anti-Aircraft Artillery Regiment, 49th Army Division was deployed to North Vietnam for air defense missions.

In November 1969, the division was transferred to the newly formed 11th Army Corps and later redesignated as the 31st Army Division (Chinese: 陆军第31师). All its regiments were redesignated as follows:

- 91st Infantry Regiment (former 145th);
- 92nd Infantry Regiment (former 146th);
- 93rd Infantry Regiment (former 147th);
- Artillery Regiment (former 307th).

During the 1984 Battle of Laoshan, the PLA launched their assault on Laoshan at 05:00 on 28 April after intense artillery bombardment. PLA forces were estimated to outnumber the size of PAVN ones. The PLA 40th Division of the 14th Army crossed the border section to the west of the Lô River, while the 31st Division took Hill 1200 on the eastern bank.

In October 1985, the division was transferred to the 14th Army and renamed the 31st Motorized Infantry Division (Chinese: 摩托化步兵第31师), as a southern motorized infantry division. Anti-Aircraft Artillery Regiment, 31st Motorized Infantry Division was established.

In 1998, the 91st Infantry Regiment merged with the 18th Tank Regiment, 5th Tank Division as the Armored Regiment, 31st Motorized Infantry Division. At the time, the division was composed of:

- 92nd Motorized Infantry Regiment;
- 93rd Motorized Infantry Regiment;
- Armored Regiment;
- Artillery Regiment;
- Anti-Aircraft Regiment.

In 2013, the division was split into two brigades: the 31st Mechanized Infantry Brigade (Chinese: 机械化步兵第31旅) and 32nd Mountain Motorized Infantry Brigade (Chinese: 山地摩托化步兵第32旅).

In April 2017, the 31st brigade was reorganized as the 31st Heavy Combined Arms Brigade (Chinese: 重型合成第31旅), while the 32nd Brigade was reorganized as the 32nd Mountain Combined Arms Brigade (Chinese: 山地合成第32旅). Both brigades are now part of the PLA 75th Group Army, stationed in Dali, Yunnan.
