= 31st Motorized Division =

31st Motorized Division may refer to:

- 31st Motorized Infantry Division (People's Republic of China)
- 31st Guards Motor Rifle Division, Soviet Union

== See also ==
- 31st Division (disambiguation)
