= 1st Garrison Division of Guangzhou Military Region =

2nd Independent Division of Guangxi Military District (1966–69, 1969-76) Independent Division of Hepu (1969) Independent Division of Guangxi Military District (1976–79) 1st Border Defense Division of Guangxi Military District(1979-85) 1st Garrison Division of Guangzhou Military Region (1985-92)
- Active: 1966.8 - 1992.12
- Country: People's Republic of China
- Branch: People's Liberation Army
- Type: Division
- Role: Infantry, Garrison
- Garrison/HQ: Hepu, Guangxi
- Engagements: Vietnam War; Sino-Vietnamese War

The 2nd Independent Division of Guangxi Military District(Chinese: 广西军区独立第2师) was formed in August 1966 from Public Security Contingent of Guangxi Zhuang Autonomous Region. The division stationed in Nanning Guangxi.

In July and August 1968, the division, along with other units of Guangxi Military District, conducted military operation against Red Guards Faction "April Twenty-Second"(Chinese: 四二二, abbreviation of "Guangxi April 22nd Revolutionary Movement Command", Chinese: 广西四二二革命行动指挥部) in Nanning, Guangxi, during which the military forces killed 1470 and "captured" over 8500 civilians.

In March 1969, the division moved to Hepu, Guangxi, leaving its 6th Regiment in Nanning (later detached and moved to Chongzuo in April). In Hepu the division absorbed former 112th Garrison Regiment (then became its new 6th Regiment).

From March to December 1969, the division was temporarily renamed as Independent Division of Hepu(Chinese: 合浦独立师). From December 1969 the division was renamed as 2nd Independent Division of Guangxi Military District again.

In January 1976, the division was renamed as Independent Division of Guangxi Military District(Chinese: 广西军区独立师) following the disbandment of 1st Independent Division of Guangxi Military District. The division was then composed of three infantry regiments (1st to 3rd) and an artillery regiment.

In February 1979, the division took part in the Sino-Vietnamese War. During the war the division suffered heavy casualties.

In April 1979, the division was renamed as 1st Border Defense Division of Guangxi Military District(Chinese: 广西军区边防第1师). All its regiments were converted to border defense regiments.

In 1985, the division was re-organized and renamed as 1st Garrison Division of Guangzhou Military Region(Chinese: 广州军区守备第1师).

The division was disbanded in December 1992.
