= 160th Brigade =

160th Brigade may refer to:

== China ==
- 160th Motorized Infantry Brigade

== Ukraine ==
- 160th Anti-Aircraft Missile Brigade
- 160th Mechanized Brigade

== United Kingdom ==
- 160th (Welsh) Brigade

== United States ==
- 160th Theater Signal Brigade

== See also ==
- 160th Division (disambiguation)
- 160th Regiment (disambiguation)
