= 1st Garrison Division of Chengdu Military Region =

Independent Division of Yunnan Provincial Military District(1979-82) 250th Army Division (1982–85) 1st Garrison Division of Chengdu Military Region(1985-92)
- Active: 1979.5 - 1992.10
- Country: People's Republic of China
- Branch: People's Liberation Army
- Type: Division
- Role: Infantry
- Part of: 14th Army Corps
- Engagements: Sino-Vietnamese War

The Independent Division of Yunnan Provincial Military District (Chinese: 云南省军区独立师)(2nd Formation) was created on 5 May 1979 basing on the May Seventh Cadre School of Kunming Military Region as a result of Sino-Vietnamese War earlier that year.

On 13 December 1982 it was renamed as 250th Army Division(Chinese: 陆军第250师), became the last division formed by PLA ground force.

The division was composed of:

- 748th Infantry Regiment;
- 749th Infantry Regiment;
- 750th Infantry Regiment;
- Artillery Regiment.

The division was part of 14th Army Corps (now 14th Army). In September 1985 the division was inactivated and renamed as 1st Garrison Division of Chengdu Military Region(Chinese: 成都军区守备第1师) and transferred to Yunnan Provincial Military District's control. In May 1992 the division was disbanded and merged into Wenshan Military Sub-district.
