= 2nd Garrison Division of Chengdu Military Region =

32nd Army Division (1969–85) 2nd Garrison Division of Chengdu Military Region (1985-92)
- Active: 1969.11-1992.11
- Country: People's Republic of China
- Branch: People's Liberation Army
- Type: Division
- Role: Infantry, Garrison
- Part of: 11th Army Corps
- Garrison/HQ: Lincang, Yunnan
- Engagements: Laotian Civil War, Sino-Vietnam War

The 32nd Army Division (Chinese: 陆军第32师)(Second Formation) was created in November 1969 in Lincang, Yunnan, from 1st Border Defense Ethnic Detachment of Kunming Military Region, 13th Border Regiment, and the Guard Regiment of Yunnan Provincial Military District. The 1st Ethnic Detachment was mainly composed of ethnic Dai, Hani, Miao and Zhuang people which heavily involved in the Laotian Civil War.

The division was a part of 11th Army Corps.

As of its activation, the division was composed of:

- 94th Regiment
- 95th Regiment
- 96th Regiment
- Artillery Regiment

From 1970 to 1974, a part of the division (96th Regiment along with anti-aircraft units) was deployed into Laos to provide security for local Chinese road construction units.

In May 1976, 95th Regiment was detached and reconstituted as Artillery Regiment, 11th Army Corps. 3rd Independent Regiment of the Kunming Military Region was attached and reconstituted into a new 95th Regiment.

In February-March 1979 and July 1984, the division took part in the Sino-Vietnam War.

In September 1985 the division was reconstituted into 2nd Garrison Division of Chengdu Military Region(Chinese: 成都军区守备第2师).

In November 1992 the division was inactivated and reconstituted as Mengzi Military Sub-district.
