= Battle of Cao Ba Lanh =

1979 battle of the Sino-Vietnamese War

- Part of the Sino-Vietnamese War, Battle of Móng Cái
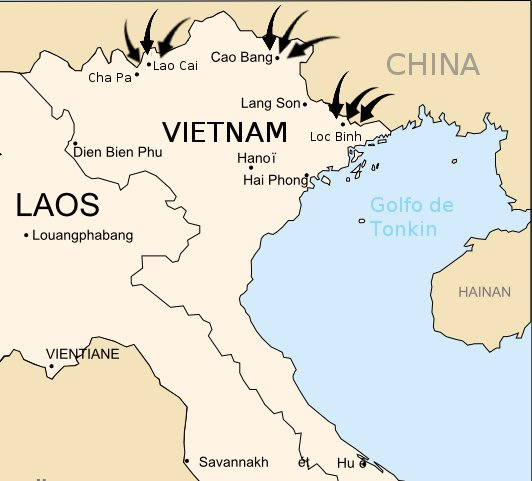
- Map of Chinese attack routes: the battle took place in the northeast near Loc Binh
Date	16–19 February 1979
Location	Cao Ba Lanh, Bình Liêu District, Quảng Ninh Province, Vietnam
Result	PLA seize Cao Ba Lanh; Vietnamese victory

Belligerents
China	Vietnam

Strength
1 regiment (up to 2,800 men)	1 platoon (initially); 1 regiment (by the 19th)

Casualties and losses
62 casualties in initial attacks, 360 casualties in regimental-sized attacks Total: 422 casualties Radio Hanoi claim: 700 casualties	Initial attacks: At least 2 from original platoon were witnessed being killed according to a veteran 109 killed in total

The Battle of Cao Ba Lanh (also known as the Battle of Hill 1050) was part of the Battle of Móng Cái, fought during the Sino-Vietnamese War between February and March 1979 near the city of Móng Cái and other districts of Quảng Ninh Province that bordered the People's Republic of China. The battle broke out as Chinese People's Liberation Army (PLA) units launched diversionary attacks in support of the Chinese invasion in the major fronts of Lạng Sơn, Cao Bằng and Lào Cai. A Chinese regiment clashed with a Vietnamese platoon, taking heavy casualties to seize the strategic peak which was later recaptured by reinforcements.

== Background ==
Cao Ba Lanh (Hill 1050) was a strategic peak located near the Sino-Vietnamese border. Overlooking the border crossing at Hoành Mô, the side which controlled it could restrict their enemy's use of that crossing. In addition, the only major road connection to Mong Cai was National Highway 4B, located near Binh Lieu. Capturing it would have cut supply lines to Mong Cai and isolated it since all reinforcement and resupply would have to be delivered by sea.

== Battle ==
On 16–17 February, the People's Liberation Army troops attacked multiple areas in Quảng Ninh, including the Hoành Mô area. Expecting an attack, the small Vietnamese platoon assigned to defend Cao Ba Lanh had placed mines and booby traps along the most likely venues of approach, before spreading itself out to maximize its field of fire. The platoon belonged to the 325th Division, and numbered around 20 men according to veteran Nguyen Duc Hop.

On the first day of fighting, the Chinese attacked with two platoons but were repulsed. They attacked again with a company of men, but were pushed back with 15 casualties. On the following day, two battalions attacked the reinforced position but retreated after losing 47 men to gunfire and booby traps. Following this, three battalions (a full regiment) attacked the hill twice after multiple heavy artillery bombardments. After five hours of fighting, the 2800-man force eventually seized the hill, losing 360 casualties in the process. The high losses were the result of well-equipped, entrenched defenders as well as poor tactics, with human wave assaults having been repeatedly used against the PAVN

== Aftermath ==
The battle exposed inadequacies in the PLA's military abilities, with a regiment having been held up by a platoon. Other battles in Quang Ninh were similarly unsuccessful, and the Vietnamese later recaptured all territories in the province. When China later declared victory in Vietnam, it mentioned every town where its forces had fought with success - no mention being made of towns in Quang Ninh.

Chinese forces lost a total of around 422 casualties in the fights for the mountain (Note: 360 casualties were incurred during the five-hour regimental-sized attacks, another 15 and 47 were suffered in earlier attacks according to O'Dowd), with 360 being lost in the regimental-sized attacks. The Vietnamese claimed to have inflicted 750 casualties on the Chinese during the battle of Cao Ba Lanh and nearby Hill 781. Hanoi Radio placed a higher figure of 700 Chinese casualties at Cao Ba Lanh, claiming to have "trounced three battalions and wiped out 700 Chinese aggressors". Casualties for the entrenched Vietnamese defenders were unclear, although Nguyen Duc Hop said he witnessed two men killed before he himself was wounded and passed out.

Further fighting took place near the hill, with the PAVN later sending in the 288th Regiment to recapture it on 19 February. The men of the original platoon were feted for their heroics, such as Hop, who was promoted by two ranks from private (2nd class) to corporal.

== Bibliography ==
- O'Dowd, Edward C. (2007). Chinese Military Strategy in the Third Indochina War: The Last Maoist War. New York: Routledge. ISBN 978-0203088968
