= Battle of Móng Cái =

1979 battle of the Sino-Vietnamese War

- Part of the Sino-Vietnamese War
- Location of Quảng Ninh Province within Vietnam
Date	16 February – 10 March 1979
Location	Móng Cái and vicinity, Quảng Ninh Province, Vietnam
Result	Vietnamese victory

Belligerents
China	Vietnam

Casualties and losses
Unknown: 422 casualties at Cao Ba Lanh	Unknown: 109 killed at Cao Ba Lanh 45 killed at Po Hen

The Battle of Móng Cái was fought during the Sino-Vietnamese War between 16 February and 10 March 1979 over the city of Móng Cái and other districts of Quảng Ninh Province that bordered the People's Republic of China. The battle broke out as Chinese People's Liberation Army (PLA) units launched diversionary attacks in support of the Chinese invasion in the major fronts of Lạng Sơn, Cao Bằng and Lào Cai. However, the Chinese failed to attract any Vietnamese reinforcements into the battle.

== Battle ==
Initiated earlier than the overall invasion, Chinese operations in Quảng Ninh area began at around 23:00 on 16 February with artillery shelling and an infantry assault against Hoành Mô, Bình Liêu District. On 17 February, the township of Móng Cái and the Xuan Hoa state farm were also subjected to Chinese artillery bombardment. On the same day, fighting broke out at nearby Pò Hèn Border Post. On 3 March, the PLA struck Hill 1050. Both of the attacks were repulsed at a loss of 750 Chinese casualties, according to a Vietnamese report. Chinese artillery continued pounding Vietnamese positions until 10 March in coordination with infantry raids in smaller scales. On 10 March alone, 3,000 shells were fired against Móng Cái and other border points in Quảng Ninh.

== Aftermath ==
As Quảng Ninh was a place of minimal strategic importance, Chinese attacks in the province could have proved wrong and wasteful, unless they had been explained as an attempt to distract the Vietnam People's Army from the major offensives. In fact, however, the assaults failed, not only to draw Vietnamese reinforcements to the area, but also to capture or retain any positions from the enemy. The lack of military skills was illustrated by Chinese combat performance in the Battle of Cao Ba Lanh, a strategic peak located 9 km from the border crossing at Hoành Mô: a regiment-sized Chinese force, after five hours staging numerous waves of mass formation attacks and the toll of 360 casualties, were eventually able to capture a height defended by a single Vietnamese platoon - losing a total of 422 men during the battle. The People's Liberation Army’s failure to seize Hoanh Mo and Binh Lieu meant they could not sever Highway 4B at Tien Yen, which would have cut land supply lines to Mong Cai.

The defeat in Quảng Ninh Province was clearly perceived by Chinese leadership. Among China's announcements about the war, there was no mention about the fighting in Quảng Ninh.
