= 131st =

131st is the ordinal form of the number 131. 131st or One hundred and thirty-first may also refer to:

- A fraction, 1/131, equal to one of 131 equal parts

== Geography ==
- 131st meridian east, a line of longitude
- 131st meridian west, a line of longitude

== Military ==
- 131st Brigade (disambiguation)
- 131st Division (disambiguation)
- 131st Regiment (disambiguation)

== See also ==
- May 11, 131st day of the year in a standard year
