= 182nd Division (People's Republic of China) =

182nd Division (1949–52) 8th Railway Engineer Division (1952-54)
- Active: 1949.2 - 1954.3
- Country: People's Republic of China
- Branch: People's Liberation Army
- Type: Division
- Role: Infantry
- Part of: 11th Corps
- Engagements: Chinese Civil War

The 182nd Division (Chinese: 第182师) was created in February 1949 under the Regulation of the Redesignations of All Organizations and Units of the Army, issued by Central Military Commission on November 1, 1948,. basing on the 38th Brigade, 13th Column of Huabei Military Region. Its history could be traced to the 1st Independent Brigade of Taihang Military District formed in October 1947.

The division was composed of 544th, 545th, and 546th Infantry Regiments. As a part of 61st Corps the division took part in the Chinese Civil War, including the Linfen Campaign, Taiyuan Campaign, Fumei Campaign and Chengdu Campaign.

In March 1951, the division was transferred to 11th Corps following 61st Corps' disbandment.

In September 1951, Tank Regiment, 182nd Division was activated, which was later renamed as 387th Tank Self-Propelled Artillery Regiment in 1953.

In October 1952 the division was reorganized as the 8th Railway Engineer Division(Chinese: 铁道工程第8师)

In May 1954, 387th Tank Self-Propelled Artillery Regiment was detached and joined 191st Division as 396th Tank Self-Propelled Artillery Regiment.

In June 1954, the division was reorganized as 4th Engineer Bureau, General Bureau of Railway Construction, Ministry of Railways.
