= Battle of Laoshan =

1984 conflict between China and Vietnam

- Part of Sino-Vietnamese conflicts (1979–1991)
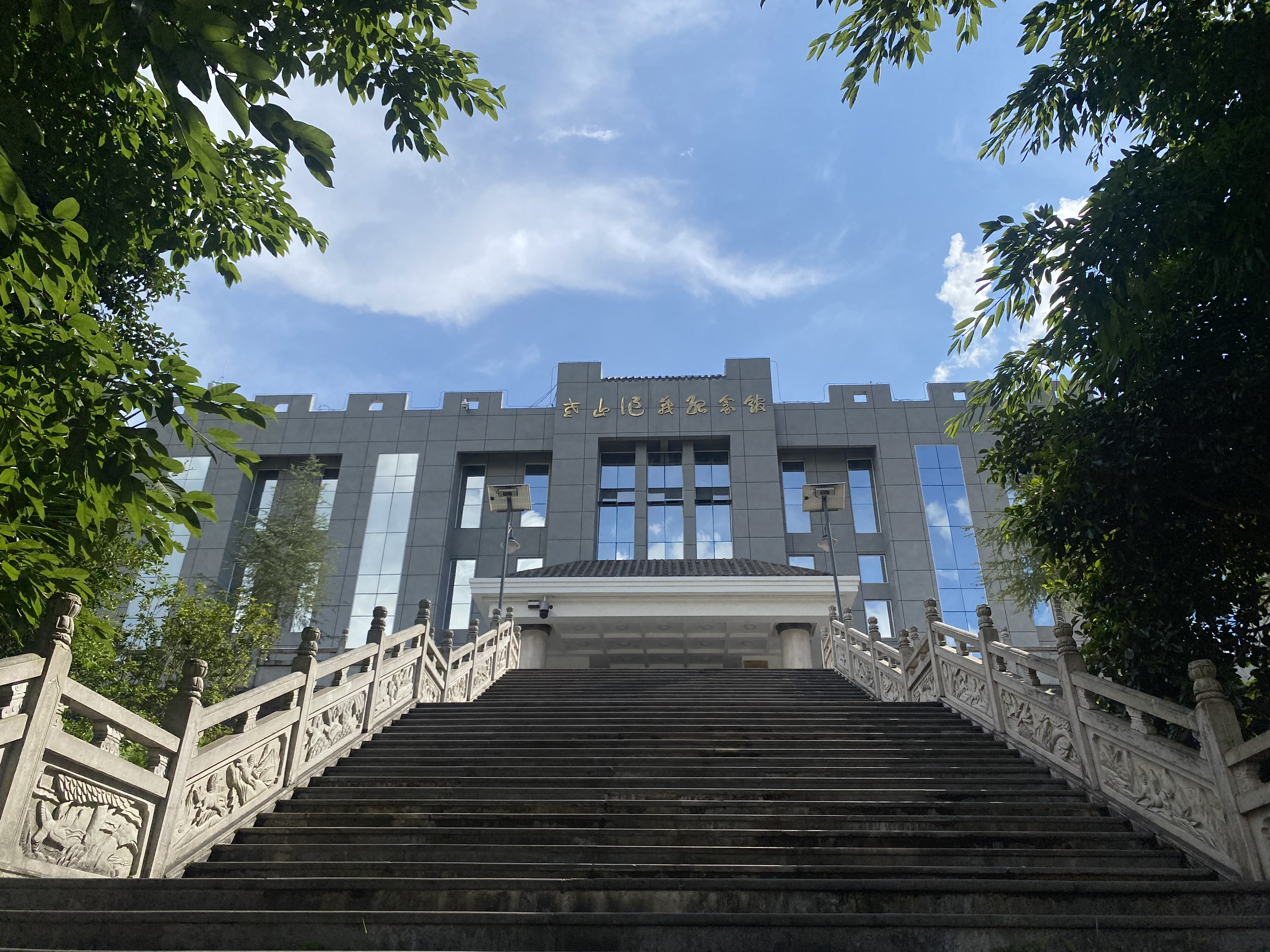
- Laoshan War Memorial Hall near Malipo County
Date	2 April – 4 August 1984 (4 months and 2 days)
Location	Laoshan on the China–Vietnam border near Malipo County and Vị Xuyên district
Result	Chinese victory
Territorial changes	China takes control of Laoshan

Belligerents
China	Vietnam

Units involved
40th Army Division; 41st Army Division: 122nd Infantry Regiment; Divisional Artillery Command; 4th Artillery Division; Artillery Regiment, 14th Corps	313th Division: 122nd Infantry Regiment; 3 other Infantry Regiments (Rear support) 168th Artillery Brigade

Strength
Offensive phase: 24,000; Counteroffensive phase Unknown	Offensive phase: 10,000; Counteroffensive phase 30,000–40,000

Casualties and losses
1,003 casualties (Offensive); 62 killed, 320 wounded (12 July)	2,000 casualties (Offensive); 3,000 casualties (12 July)

The Battle of Laoshan (Chinese: 老山战役), known in Vietnam as the Battle of Vị Xuyên (Vietnamese: Mặt trận Vị Xuyên) was fought in 1984 between China and Vietnam as part of Sino-Vietnamese conflicts (1979–1991) during the Third Indochina War. It is considered the largest scale engagement involving both countries since the 1979 Sino-Vietnamese War.

== Background ==
=== Border conflicts ===
Prior to the battle, Vietnam was still dealing with the Cambodian–Vietnamese War and FULRO insurgency. Starting from 1983, Vietnamese border raids in Thailand increased as Vietnam aimed to eliminate the remnants of the Khmer Rouge forces who fled there. The remnants still engaged in guerrilla warfare aiming to attack Vietnamese occupation forces in Cambodia. China had pledged support to the resistance fighters and in February 1983, Yang Dezhi of the People's Liberation Army General (PLA) Staff Department visited Thailand promising to provide aid should they ever be attacked by Vietnam. In April 1983, Li Xiannian (elected President in June) warned Vietnam that China would not stop its support for Thailand as long as Vietnam kept up its aggression towards it. In December 1983, Deng Xiaoping met Norodom Sihanouk of the Coalition Government of Democratic Kampuchea. Sihanouk requested help from Deng as Vietnam forces were continuing to attack resistance group positions.

As a result of its previous pledges, China planned to attack Laoshan to relieve Vietnamese pressure on resistance forces. Commander-in-Chief of the Royal Thai Army, Arthit Kamlang-ek was invited by China to visit the battlefield and to discuss with PLA officers how they fought against the People's Army of Vietnam (PAVN).

=== Laoshan ===
Laoshan is a range of hills located on the China–Vietnam border between Malipo County, Yunnan and Vị Xuyên, Hà Giang. It consists of three ridges, radiating from its main peak which is 1,422 meters high. It is unclear why China chose to attack at Laoshan as it was mountainous and was difficult to reach from anywhere except Hà Giang. However, there were several beliefs. One view was that since it was also challenging to reach from Hanoi, attacking it could divert many PAVN troops away from other regions, or even capture the provincial capital itself – a major psychological blow. It is also believed it was selected because it would show to Thailand that China would not tolerate any loss of territory not matter how remote it was and also force Vietnam to break its concentration on Cambodia and Thailand.

== Battle ==
=== China Offensive Phase (Project 14 and Project 17) ===
There were two components to the offensive. Project 14 was a ground assault and Project 17 was an artillery bombardment. From 2 to 27 April 1984, China had conducted the heaviest artillery barrage since 1979 against the Vietnamese border region, with more than 60,000 shells pounding 16 districts in Lạng Sơn, Cao Bằng, Hà Tuyên, and Hoàng Liên Sơn Provinces. 256 artillery pieces bombarded the areas with 414 targets being allegedly hit. Decoy ground attacks were used in an attempt to lure PAVN forces into the open so the artillery could hit them. This was accompanied by a wave of infantry battalion-sized attacks on 6 April. The largest of them took place in Tràng Định District, Lạng Sơn Province, with several Chinese battalions assaulting Hills 820 and 636 near the routes taken during the 1979 invasion at the Friendship Gate. Despite mobilizing a large force, the Chinese were either beaten back or forced to abandon captured positions by the next day. Chinese documents later revealed that the ground attacks primarily served the diversionary objective, with their scales much lower than that reported by Western sources.

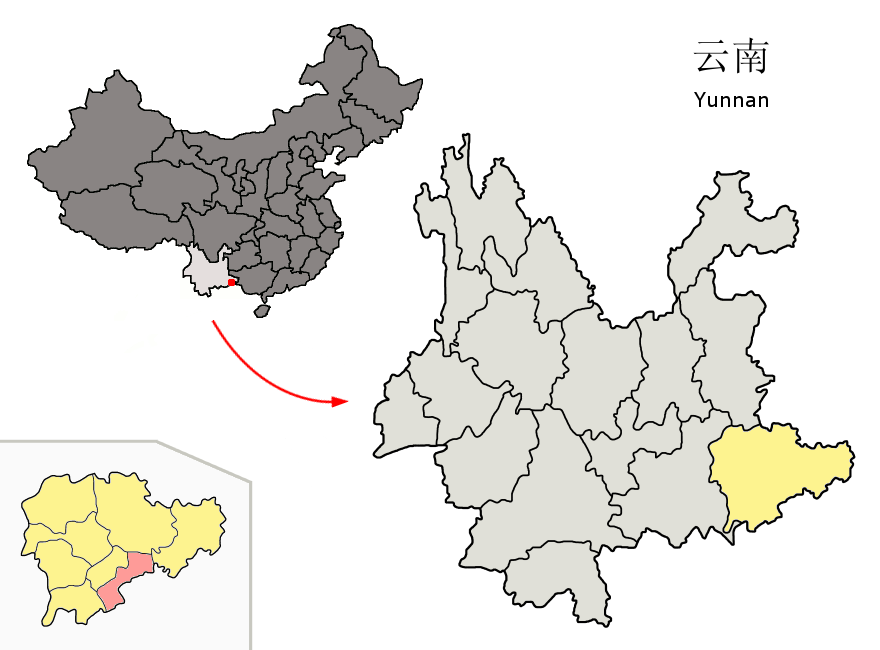
Location of Malipo County (pink) and Wenshan Prefecture (yellow) within Yunnan province of China.

The PLA launched their assault on Laoshan at 05:00 on 28 April after intense artillery bombardment. PLA forces were estimated to outnumber the size of PAVN ones. The PLA 40th Division of the 14th Army crossed the border section to the west of the Lô River, while the 31st Division took Hill 1200 on the eastern bank. The Vietnamese defenders, including the PAVN 313th Division and 168th Artillery Brigade, were forced to retreat from the hills. PLA troops captured the hamlet of Na La, as well as Hills 233, 685 and 468, creating a salient of 2.5 km thrusting into Vietnam. These positions were shielded by steep cliffs covered by dense forests along the Thanh Thủy River, and could only be accessed by crossing the exposed eastern side of the Lô River valley. In roughly the same timeframe, the PLA conducted a similar operation on Zheyinshan, a nearby hill range east of Laoshan.

Fighting continued in other places such as Hills 1509 (Laoshan), 772, 233, 1200 (Zheyinshan) and 1030, over which control constantly changed hands. Although the hills were eventually secured, the performance regarding Laoshan was considered poor by the PLA. Factors such as bad timing, not considering terrain conditions and lack of flexibility between subordinates and officers lead to the assault being behind schedule with losses exceeding expectations. However unlike Laoshan, the performance for Zheyinshan was much better as the commanders allowed more flexibility and postponed the attack by an hour to let troops rest longer after heavy rain delays . Liao Xilong was the commanding officer and was promoted for his achievements.

The battle paused on 15 May, as Chinese forces had virtually secured these eight hills. Chinese records show 939 Chinese soldiers killed or wounded as well as 64 civilian laborors killed as of that date. After 15 May, the PLA started building defense fortifications on the hills.

=== Vietnam Counteroffensive Phase (MB84 Campaign) ===
The PAVN planned to retake the eight hills in a counteroffensive operation known as the MB84 Campaign. Military leader such as Lê Trọng Tấn, Le Ngoc Hien and Vũ Lập gathered at Hà Giang to come up with a plan. They were assisted by Soviet advisers. The 313th Division which was the original defense force during the initial assault would be replenished. Additional infantry and artillery regiments from other Divisions were sent to provide additional support to the 313th Division. With this the PAVN that was outnumbered during the initial assault of Laoshan now was believed to have force size superior to the PLA in the region.

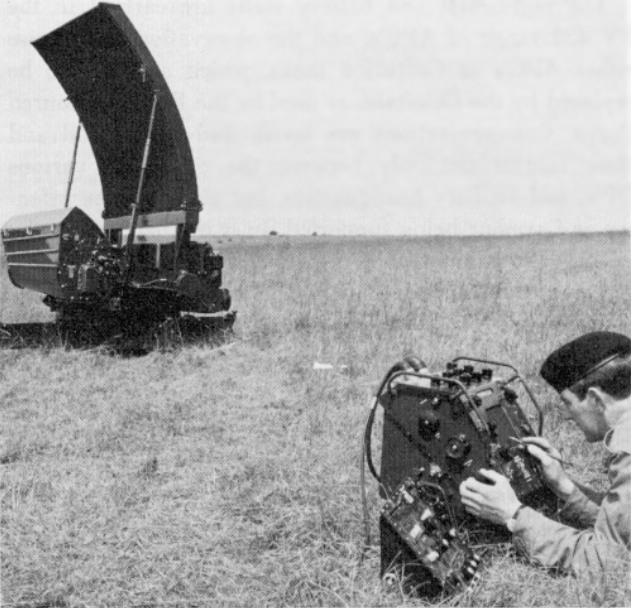
Cymbeline radar

The first main counteroffensive was launched on 11 June with the target being the hamlet of Na La. However PLA defenders managed to hold off the attack. In late afternoon on the same day, a second attempt was made which was once again repulsed. Precise artilitary fire was considered one of the main reasons for the PLA's successful defense. The PLA recently imported Cymbeline radars from the United Kingdom which allowed it to locate the PAVN artillery. PLA forces were strengthened but the defensive positions were changed so there were fewer troops in key locations with the rest kept behind lines ready to provide replenishment.

On 19 June, the PAVN sent additional troops to support the MB84 Campaign. Troop size was said to have reached 40,000. In addition from 12 to 22 June, more than 30,000 artillery shells and 2,000,000 bullets were provided. On 5 July, a Dac Cong/Sapper unit from the PAVN 821st Sapper Regiment attacked the site of a Cymbeline radar resulting in 11 casualties (1 loss and 10 injuries) for the unit while inflicting 49 casualties (9 losses and 40 injuries) on PLA forces. Nonetheless, the attack reportedly alarmed Deng Xiaoping, who ordered reconnaissance units to be deployed extensively.

The second main counteroffensive was launched on 12 July. This time not just the Hamlet of Na La but also multiple hills (1030, 233, 685, 300, 400) were targeted to be assaulted at the same time. This would be considered the largest Vietnamese offensive operation since 1979 Sino-Vietnamese War. However once again despite the large number of troops charging to take the hills, the PLA artillery firepower was too much for the PAVN forces. The counteroffensive lasted more than 18 hours. On that day Chinese records, put PAVN casualties at 1,080 but Chinese intercept of Vietnamese communications traffic led officials to revise the number to 3,000.

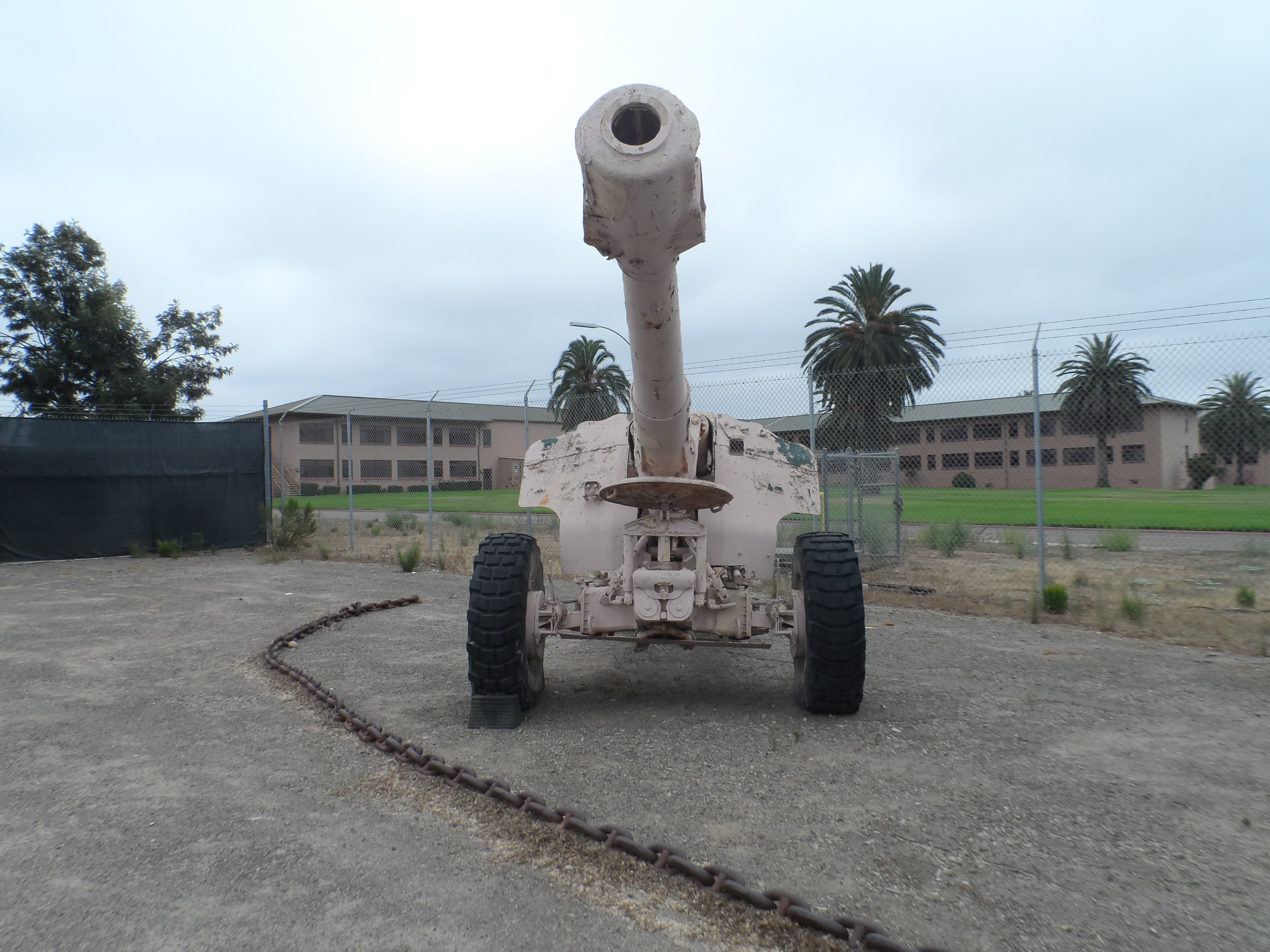
Type 66 howitzer.

To defend the captured area, the PLA stationed two armies in the Vị Xuyên region, consisting of four infantry divisions, two artillery divisions, and several tank regiments. Chinese artillery positioned on the hills included 130 mm field guns, 152 mm howitzers, and 40-barrel multiple rocket launchers, while infantry regiments were equipped with 85 mm guns and 100-D mortars. The PLA used tanks in some of the battles. Other equipment that helped the PLA forces included Night Vision Goggles and target finding radars. This allowed PLA to locate hidden or resting PAVN soldiers under darkness as a cover and fire artillery on their positions. One of the most important factors to PLA success is "rear service" which was a logistics system. This system allowed over 120,000 artillery shells to be shipped to the frontlines. As a result, PLA artillery units could fire at enemy positions without ever worrying about running out of ammunition. Despite the PAVN also heavily relying on artillery, they did not have this system leading to ammunition shortages.

Afterwards, fighting was gradually reduced and by end of July, active fighting had stopped to become sporadic artillery duels and skirmishes. PAVN commanders called off the attack due to heavy casualties and ammunition shortages. According to U.S. intelligence reports, Vietnamese forces failed to retake the eight hills. As the result, the PLA occupied 29 points within Vietnamese territory, including Hills 1509 and 772 west of the Lô River, as well as Hills 1250 and 1030 and Mount Si-La-Ca in the east. Along the 11-kilometer border segment, the deepest Chinese intrusion was made at Hills 685 and 468 located approximately 2 km to the south.

== Aftermath ==
The fighting around Laoshan and Zheyinshan continued but was now more limited. Vietnam's policy towards Cambodia and Thailand, however, still remained the same.

China decided to keep the pressure on Vietnam and continued to place troops on defensive positions on Laoshan and Zheyinshan. The PLA saw Laoshan as an opportunity to train its troops and ordered a troop rotation. From 1984 to 1989, there were a total of five rotations involving the military command regions Nanjing, Jinan, Lanzhou, Beijing, and Chengdu.

From April 1987, the PLA began to scale down their military operations, yet still routinely patrolled the Laoshan and Zheyinshan areas. By 1992, China had formally pulled out its troops from Laoshan and Zheyinshan after ties were normalized between China and Vietnam in 1991.

The battle is noted for its large use of artillery from both sides. It played an important role in the development of the PLA's approach to warfare as it aimed to transition to a more modern approach after the 1979 Sino-Vietnamese War. Significant improvements to its artillery's usage were noted where there was more focus on precision fire rather than solely using artillery barrages. However, infantry tactics were still in need of improvement.

== Bibliography ==
- Zhang, Xiaoming (6 May 2015). Deng Xiaoping's Long War: The Military Conflict between China and Vietnam, 1979–1991. UNC Press Books. ISBN 978-1-4696-2125-8.
- O'Dowd, Edward C. (16 April 2007). Chinese Military Strategy in the Third Indochina War: The Last Maoist War. Routledge. ISBN 978-1-134-12267-7.
- Li, Xiaobing (1 June 2007). A History of the Modern Chinese Army (PDF). University Press of Kentucky. ISBN 978-0-8131-7224-8.
- Tian, Fuzi (2004). 《中越战争记实录》 [Factual Records of Sino-Vietnamese War] (in Chinese (China)). Beijing: People's Liberation Army Art Press. ISBN 978-7-5033-1645-6.
