= 131st Division (2nd Formation) (People's Republic of China) =

27th Garrison Division(1964-70) 131st Army Division (1970–85)
- Active: 1964 - 1985
- Country: People's Republic of China
- Branch: People's Liberation Army
- Type: Division
- Role: Garrison, Infantry
- Part of: Hainan Military district
- Garrison/HQ: Tunchang, Hainan
- Engagements: Sino-Vietnam War

27th Garrison Division (Chinese: 守备第27师) was formed in summer 1964 in Tunchang, Hainan. The division acted as a mobile defense force of northern Hainan island.

In 1970 the division was reorganized and renamed as 131st Army Division({zh|陆军第131师}). The division was then composed of:

- 391st Infantry Regiment;
- 392nd Infantry Regiment;
- 393rd Infantry Regiment;
- Artillery Regiment.

In December 1979, 391st Infantry Regiment was detached and converted to 1st Marine Brigade.

From July 1982 to March 1983, 392nd Infantry Regiment was deployed to Guangxi to take part in the Sino-Vietnam War. During its deployment the regiment inflicted about 50 casualties to confronting PAVN units.

In 1985 the division was disbanded. All remnants were absorbed into 132nd Infantry Division.
