= 75th Group Army =

Former Chinese military unit

- 第七十五集团军
- Country: China
- Allegiance: Chinese Communist Party
- Branch: People's Liberation Army Ground Force
- Type: Group army
- Part of: Southern Theater Command Ground Force
- Garrison/HQ: Kunming, Yunnan
- Engagements: World War II; Chinese Civil War; Vietnam War; Sino-Vietnamese War

Commanders
- Current commander: Major General Gai Limin
- Political Commissar: Major General Wei Wenbo

Insignia
- NATO Map Symbol

The 75th Group Army (Chinese: 第七十五集团军; pinyin: Dì Qīshíwǔ Jítuánjūn), Unit 31663, formerly the 41st Group Army, is a military formation of the Chinese People's Liberation Army Ground Force (PLAGF). The 75th Group Army is one of thirteen total group armies of the PLAGF, the largest echelon of ground forces in the People's Republic of China, and one of two assigned to the nation's Southern Theater Command.

== Organization ==
=== Pre-2017 ===
- 121st Mountain Motorized Infantry Brigade (Chinese: 山地摩托化步兵第121旅)
- 122nd Mechanized Infantry Brigade (Chinese: 机械化步兵第122旅)
- 123rd Mechanized Infantry Division (Chinese: 机械化步兵第123师)
- 15th Armored Brigade (Chinese: 装甲第15旅)
- Artillery Brigade (Chinese: 炮兵旅)
- Air-Defense Brigade (Chinese: 防空旅)
- Army Aviation Regiment (Chinese: 陆军航空兵团)
- Boat Regiment (Chinese: 舟桥团)
- Chemical-Defense Regiment (Chinese: 防化团)
- Engineer Regiment (Chinese: 工兵团)

=== Post-2017 ===
- 31st Heavy Combined Arms Brigade (Chinese: 重型合成第31旅) (equipped with Type 96A tanks, ZBD-04 IFVs)
- 32nd Mountain Combined Arms Brigade (Chinese: 山地合成第32旅)
- 37th Light Combined Arms Brigade (Chinese: 轻型合成第37旅)
- 42nd Light Combined Arms Brigade (Chinese: 轻型合成第42旅)
- 122nd Medium Combined Arms Brigade (Chinese: 中型合成第122旅) - Stationed in Guilin, equipped with ZBL-08 and ZTL-11
- 123rd Heavy Combined Arms Brigade (Chinese: 重型合成第123旅) - Stationed in Guigang, equipped with ZTQ-15 and ZBD-86A
- 121st Air Assault Brigade (Chinese: 空中突击第121旅)
- 75th Special Operation Brigade (Chinese: 特种作战第75旅)
- 75th Artillery Brigade (Chinese: 炮兵第75旅)
- 75th Air-Defense Brigade (Chinese: 防空第75旅)(equipped with Tor-M1 and type 09 anti air system)
- 75th Engineer and Chemical-Defense Brigade (Chinese: 工兵防化第75旅)
- 75th Sustainment Brigade (Chinese: 勤务支援第75旅)
