= 1st Independent Division of Guangxi Military District =

Independent Division of Hunan Provincial Military District (1966-69) Independent Division of Nanning (1969–70) 1st Independent Division of Guangxi Military District (1970-76)
- Active: 1966.7 - 1976.1
- Country: People's Republic of China
- Branch: People's Liberation Army
- Type: Division
- Role: Infantry
- Garrison/HQ: Nanning, Guangxi

Independent Division of Hunan Provincial Military District (Chinese: 湖南省军区独立师)(1st Formation) was formed in July 1966 from the Public Security Contingent of the Hunan province. The division was composed of three regiments (1st to 3rd) and two independent battalions.

In March 1969 the division (except for its independent battalions) moved to Guangxi and was renamed as Independent Division of Nanning (Chinese: 南宁独立师).

In October 1970 the division was renamed as 1st Independent Division of Guangxi Military District (Chinese: 广西军区独立第1师).

In January 1976 the division was disbanded.
