= 160th Motorized Infantry Brigade =

Brigade of the People's Liberation Army

130th Division (1948-53) 130th Infantry Division (1953-60) 130th Army Division (1960-69) 160th Army Division (1969-85) 160th Infantry Division (1969-98) 160th Motorized Infantry Brigade (1998-2003, 2012-17) 160th Heavy Combined Arms Brigade (2017-)
- Active: 1948.11 - 2003; 2012 -
- Country: People's Republic of China
- Branch: People's Liberation Army Ground Force, People's Volunteer Army
- Type: Combined Arms
- Size: Brigade
- Part of: 71st Group Army
- Garrison/HQ: Xiangcheng, Henan (before 2017)
- Engagements: Chinese Civil War, Korean War, Sino-Indian War, Vietnam War, Sino-Vietnamese War

The 130th Army Division, now the 160th Heavy Combined Arms Brigade was a military formation of the People's Liberation Army Ground Force of the People's Republic of China. It is the only PLA division that took part in all three major wars of PLA after 1949.

The 130th Division (Chinese: 第130师) was created in November 1948 under the Regulation of the Redesignations of All Organizations and Units of the Army, issued by Central Military Commission on November 1, 1948, basing on the 19th Division, 7th Column of Northeastern Field Army. Its history could be traced to 1st Security Brigade of Liaoji Military District formed in October 1945. Under the command of 44th Corps it took part in many major battles during the Chinese Civil War. The division is the only unit that fought all four times of the Battle of Siping.

In October 1952 the division was transferred to 54th Corps after 44th's disbandment.

In February 1953 the division entered Korea as a part of People's Volunteer Army. During its deployment in Korea it took part in the Battle of Kumsong. In 1953 the division was renamed as the 130th Infantry Division (Chinese: 步兵第130师). In May 1958 it pulled out from Korea.

In 1959 the division was moved to Tibet to deal with the Tibetan uprising.

In 1960 the division was renamed as the 130th Army Division (Chinese: 陆军第130师). By then the division was composed of:

- 388th Infantry Regiment;
- 389th Infantry Regiment;
- 390th Infantry Regiment;
- 540th Artillery Regiment.

In 1962 the division took part in the Sino-Indian War. During the war the division overrun Indian 11th Brigade, inflicted more than 1,200 casualties to Indian Army.

In December 1969 the division was renamed as the 160th Army Division (Chinese: 陆军第160师). All regiments of the division was renamed as follows:

- 478th Infantry Regiment (former 388th);
- 479th Infantry Regiment (former 389th);
- 480th Infantry Regiment (former 390th);
- Artillery Regiment (former 540th).

In February 1979 the division took part in the Battle of Cao Bang during Sino-Vietnamese War.

In 1985 the division was renamed as the 160th Infantry Division (Chinese: 步兵第160师). From 1985 to 1998 the division maintained as a Northern Infantry Division, Catalogue B.

In 1998 the division was reduced and renamed as the 160th Motorized Infantry Brigade (Chinese: 摩托化步兵第160旅).

In 2003 it appears the brigade was disbanded.

In 2012 160th brigade was recomposed and was an element of 54th group army. Retired Lieutenant General Dong Zhanlin, who commanded 130th division in Sino-Indian war, attended its recomposing ceremony.

In 2017 it was reorganized as the 160th Heavy Combined Arms Brigade (Chinese: 重型合成第160旅) and transferred to the 71st Group Army.
