= Kunming Military Region =

Former military region of China

The Kunming Military Region was a military region of the People's Liberation Army, established in December 1954 or 1955 and disestablished during the 1980s. It was incorporated within the Chengdu Military Region.

In the 1954 reorganization that established 13 Military Regions, Xie Fuzhi was given command of the Kunming MR and Qin Jiwei was made deputy commander. Later Qin became commander of the region (1960–67).

In March 1967, the Central Intelligence Agency identified some 35 field corps, of which two, the 13th and 14th, were within the Kunming MR.

In late December 1978 or early January 1979, ahead of the 1979 Sino-Vietnamese border war, the PLA established the Southern Front to direct the Kunming and Guangzhou Military Regions. Yang Dezhi moved from command of the Wuhan Military Region to become deputy commander of the Southern Front and commander of the Kunming Military Region.

In May 1979, the May Seventh Cadre School of the Kunming Military Region became the Independent Division of Yunnan Provincial Military District, as a result of the Sino-Vietnamese war earlier that year. In December 1982 it became the 250th Army Division, part of the 14th Army.
