= 131st Division (1st Formation) (People's Republic of China) =

131st Division (1948-53)
- Active: 1948.11 - 1953.2
- Country: (China)
- Branch: Infantry
- Type: Infantry
- Size: Division
- Part of: 44th Corps
- Engagements: Chinese Civil War

The 131st Division (Chinese: 第131师) was created in November 1948 under the Regulation of the Redesignations of All Organizations and Units of the Army, issued by Central Military Commission on November 1, 1948, basing on the 20th Division, 7th Column of the PLA Northeastern Field Army. Its history can be traced to 2nd Security Brigade of Liaoji Military District formed in December 1946.

The division is part of 44th Corps. Under the flag of 132nd division it took part in several major battles during the Chinese Civil War. The division was composed of 391st, 392nd and 393rd Regiments.

In October 1952 the division was transferred to the Navy after 44th Corps' disbandment.

In February 1953 the division was inactivated. Its division HQ was converted to HQ, 3rd Naval Aviation Division; its 391st Infantry was transferred to newly-formed 54th Corps as 391st Regiment, 134th Infantry Division.
