= Sino-Vietnamese conflicts (1979–1991) =

Series of border and naval clashes between China and Vietnam

- Part of the Third Indochina War, the Sino-Soviet Split and the Cold War in Asia
- Chinese PLA officer Ma Quanbin reports to his command after a battle against Vietnamese forces on 14 October 1986 during the Project Blue Sword-B.
| Date | 17 February 1979 – 5 November 1991 (12 years, 8 months, 2 weeks and 5 days) |
| Location | Sino-Vietnamese border and the Spratly Islands |
| Result | Conflict subsides without the outbreak of a full-scale war; Normalization of relations between China and Vietnam in 1991 |
| Territorial changes | Temporary Chinese occupation of several areas within Vietnamese territory, in Vị Xuyên, Hà Giang (returned to Vietnam in 1992); Chinese capture of six reefs in the Spratly Islands |

Belligerents
| China | Vietnam |

Commanders and leaders
| Deng Xiaoping Chairman of the CPPCC (1979–83) Chairman of the CMC (1981–89); Jiang Zemin General Secretary & Chairman of the CMC (1989-91); Ye Jianying Chairman of the NPCSC (1979–83); Li Xiannian President (1983–88); Yang Shangkun President (1988–91); Yang Dezhi; Xu Shiyou | Lê Duẩn General Secretary (1979–86); Trường Chinh General Secretary (1986) Chairman of the CS (1981–87); Nguyễn Văn Linh General Secretary (1986–91); Tôn Đức Thắng President (1979–80); Nguyễn Hữu Thọ President (1980–81); Võ Chí Công Chairman of the CS (1987–91); Văn Tiến Dũng; Đàm Quang Trung; Vũ Lập |

Strength
| c. 200,000–400,000 | c. 600,000–800,000 (including irregular units) |

The Sino-Vietnamese conflicts of 1979–1991 were a series of border and naval clashes between the People's Republic of China and the Socialist Republic of Vietnam following the Sino-Vietnamese War in 1979. These clashes lasted from the end of the Sino-Vietnamese War until the normalization of ties in 1991.

When the Chinese People's Liberation Army (PLA) withdrew from Vietnam in March 1979 after the war, China announced that they were not ambitious for "any square inch of the territory of Vietnam". However, Chinese troops occupied an area of 60 square kilometres (23 sq mi), which was disputed land controlled by Vietnam before hostilities broke out. In some places such as the area around Friendship Gate near the city of Lạng Sơn, Chinese troops occupied territories which had little military value but important symbolic value. Elsewhere, Chinese troops occupied the strategic positions of military importance as springboards to attack Vietnam.

The Chinese occupation of border territory angered Vietnam, and this ushered in a series of border conflicts between Vietnam and China to gain control of the area. These conflicts continued until 1988, peaking in the years 1984–1985. By the early 1990s, along with the withdrawal of Vietnam from Cambodia and the dissolution of the Soviet Union, the relationship between the two countries gradually returned to normality. By 1991, the two countries proclaimed the normalization of their diplomatic relations, thereby ending the border conflicts.

== Background ==
After 1979, there were at least six clashes on the Sino-Vietnamese border in June and October 1980, May 1981, April 1983, April 1984, June 1985, and from October 1986 to January 1987. According to Western observers, all were initiated or provoked by the Chinese to serve political objectives. The imminent threat of another invasion by the northern neighbor impelled Vietnam to build up an enormous defending force. During the 1980s, around 600,000–800,000 Vietnamese regulars and paramilitaries were estimated to have been deployed in the frontier areas, confronted by some 200,000–400,000 Chinese troops.

Throughout the conflict, the Vietnamese Vị Xuyên District had been the most violent front. According to cursory examination, seven divisions (the 313th, 314th, 325th, 328th, 354th, 356th, and 411th) and one separate regiment (the 266th/341st) of Vietnamese forces were involved on this battlefield in the mid-1980s. On the Chinese side, armies from seven military regions were rotated through this area to "touch the tiger's butt", a euphemism for obtaining combat experiences given by Chinese paramount leader, Deng Xiaoping. From 1984 to 1989, at least 14 Chinese armies had been substitutionally committed to the fight in the area (1st, 12th, 13th, 14th, 16th, 20th, 23rd, 26th, 27th, 38th, 41st, 42nd, 47th, and 67th).

Besides the use of regular forces, China also armed and trained ethnic resistance groups (especially from the Hmong people) to wage unconventional warfare against the governments of Vietnam and Laos. From 1985, Chinese support for these insurgents began to shrink, as the Laotian government initiated normalization of relations with China.

== 1980: Shelling of Cao Bằng ==
Since early 1980, China had orchestrated military operations during the dry season to sweep Khmer Rouge forces over the Cambodia-Thailand border. To put pressure on Vietnam to withdraw military forces from Cambodia, China had garrisoned several armies along the Sino–Vietnamese border. China also provided military training for some 5,000 anti-Laotian Hmong insurgents in Yunnan Province and used this force to sabotage the Muang Sing area in northwestern Laos near the Sino-Laotian border. Vietnam responded by increasing forces stationed at the Sino-Vietnamese border, and China no longer had the overwhelming numerical superiority as it did in its campaign in February 1979.

In June 1980, the People's Army of Vietnam (PAVN) crossed the Thai–Cambodian border during the pursuit of the defeated Khmer Rouge. Despite swift Vietnamese withdrawal from Thai territory, the Vietnamese incursion made China feel that it had to act to support its allies, Thailand and the Khmer Rouge. From 28 June to 6 July, in addition to outspoken criticism of Vietnam in diplomatic announcements, the Chinese continuously shelled the Vietnamese Cao Bằng Province. Small-scale skirmishes also took place along the border later in the year, with seven incidents occurring in the first half of October. China accused Vietnam of conducting cross-border raids against Chinese positions in the Luojiaping area, Maguan County, Yunnan Province on 30 September and 1 October, in which 3 Chinese border guards or militiamen were killed. The Chinese launched a retaliatory assault against Vietnamese positions in the same area on 15 October, in which they killed 42 Vietnamese troops and captured 3.

The Chinese shelling did not aim at any strategic military target or create any substantial damage in Vietnam. Vietnam felt that the conduct of military operations on a larger scale was beyond Chinese capabilities, and that this gave them a free hand to conduct military operations in Cambodia. The Chinese shelling was indicative of the type of conflict the Sino-Vietnamese border would see for the next 10 years.

== 1981: Battle of Hill 400 (Battle of Fakashan) ==
On 2 January 1981, the Vietnamese Ministry of Foreign Affairs proposed a ceasefire during the Lunar New Year festival. While this proposal was rejected by China on 20 January, the two sides continued the exchange of prisoners of war. The situation was relatively calm for the next few months.

In May 1981, ferocious fighting erupted in Cao Lộc District, Lạng Sơn Province, when the PLA launched a regiment-sized attack on 5 May against a height known as Fakashan (法卡山) to the Chinese and Hill 400 to the Vietnamese, and an attack against a strategic peak designated as Hill 1688, or named Koulinshan (扣林山) by the Chinese, on 7 May. Bloody engagements claimed hundreds of lives from each side. To justify this military operation, China announced that the attacks were in response to acts of aggression by Vietnam during the first quarter of that year.

Starting on 10 May, Vietnamese forces carried out counterattacks against Chinese troops. A Vietnamese infantry company also struck the Mengdong co-operative commune in Malipo County, Yunnan Province; Chinese newspapers reported that 85 Vietnamese soldiers, including 2 officers, were killed. Throughout the battles at Fakashan and Koulinshan, Chinese reports claimed a total of 1,200 Vietnamese personnel killed or wounded.

Although the conflict raged on, China did not want to escalate and only deployed border guard units instead of regular troops into the battles. Western observers assessed that China was unlikely to teach Vietnam a "lesson" like in 1979, especially when Vietnam had strengthened its regular forces in border areas and had a clear advantage in terms of equipment. Other analysts pointed out that the upcoming rainy season and the recent cuts in its military budget would preclude China's carrying out a large-scale invasion.

== 1984: Battle of Vị Xuyên (Battle of Laoshan) ==
From 2 to 27 April 1984, in support of Cambodian rebel forces whose bases were being overrun by the Vietnamese Army during the K5 dry season offensive, China had conducted the heaviest artillery barrage since 1979 against the Vietnamese border region, with 60,000 shells pounding 16 districts in Lạng Sơn, Cao Bằng, Hà Tuyên, and Hoàng Liên Sơn Provinces. This was accompanied by a wave of infantry battalion-sized attacks on 6 April. The largest of them took place in Tràng Định District, Lạng Sơn Province, with several Chinese battalions assaulting Hills 820 and 636 near the routes taken during the 1979 invasion at the Friendship Gate. Despite mobilizing a large force, the Chinese were either beaten back or forced to abandon captured positions by the next day. Chinese documents later revealed that the ground attacks primarily served the diversionary objective, with their scales much lower than that reported by Western sources.

In Hà Tuyên, from April to July 1984, Chinese forces struck a strip of hills in Vị Xuyên District, named Laoshan (老山) by the Chinese. Laoshan is a string of mountains running from the western part of Hill 1800 to another hill at an elevation of 1,200 m in the east. This easternmost hill has been referred to by the Chinese as either Dongshan (东山) or Zheyinshan (者阴山), and was also the only position on the eastern bank of the Lô River where fighting occurred.

The PLA launched their assault at 05:00 on 28 April after intense artillery bombardment. The PLA 40th Division of the 14th Army crossed the border section to the west of the Lô River, while the 49th Division (probably from the 16th Army) took Hill 1200 on the eastern bank. The Vietnamese defenders, including the PAVN 313th Division and 168th Artillery Brigade, were forced to retreat from the hills. PLA troops captured the hamlet of Na La, as well as Hills 233, 685 and 468, creating a salient of 2.5 kilometres (1.6 mi) thrusting into Vietnam. These positions were shielded by steep cliffs covered by dense forests along the Thanh Thủy River, and could only be accessed by crossing the exposed eastern side of the Lô River valley.

After 28 April, fighting continued in other places such as Hills 1509 (Laoshan), 772, 233, 1200 (Zheyinshan) and 1030, over which control constantly changed hands. The battle paused on 15 May, as Chinese forces had virtually secured these hills, but resumed on 12 June and again on 12 July as the PAVN mounted counter-attacks in an attempt to recapture the lost positions. Afterwards, fighting was gradually reduced to sporadic artillery duels and skirmishes. According to U.S. intelligence reports, Vietnamese forces failed to retake the eight hills. As the result, the PLA occupied 29 points within Vietnamese territory, including Hills 1509 and 772 west of the Lô River, as well as Hills 1250 and 1030 and Mount Si-La-Ca in the east. Along the 11-kilometre (6.8 mi) border segment, the deepest Chinese intrusion was made at Hills 685 and 468 located approximately 2 kilometres (1.2 mi) to the south. However, the Chinese failed to advance any further than 5 kilometres (3.1 mi) southward, despite their outnumbering force. The heights continued to be contested in a string of later engagements, which lasted until 1986.

To defend the captured area, the PLA stationed two armies in the Vị Xuyên region, consisting of four infantry divisions, two artillery divisions, and several tank regiments. Chinese artillery positioned on the hills included 130 millimetres (5.1 in) field guns, 152 millimetres (6.0 in) howitzers, and 40-barrel multiple rocket launchers, while infantry regiments were equipped with 85 millimetres (3.3 in) guns and 100-D mortars. The PLA used tanks in some of the battles.

In June, the Vietnamese claimed to have annihilated one regiment and eight battalions of the PLA, equivalent to about 5,500 Chinese casualties. They raised the number to 7,500 by August. In contrast, the Chinese reported they had inflicted approximately 2,000 casualties on Vietnamese forces, while losing 939 soldiers and 64 laborers killed during the five-week offensive campaign in Laoshan. 1,080–3,000 Vietnamese deaths was additionally claimed by the Chinese after the action on 12 July. The Vietnamese admitted that the PAVN 356th Division alone suffered 600 killed on that day.

== 1986–87: "Phony war" ==
In 1985, the Chinese fired more than 800,000 shells into Vị Xuyên of about one million shells targeted at Vietnamese border regions; this activity, however, significantly dropped in the period from 1986 to early 1987, with only several tens of thousands of rounds fired per month. In 1986, General Secretary of the Communist Party of the Soviet Union Mikhail Gorbachev called for the normalization of relations between Vietnam and China in a speech in Vladivostok. In October 1986, China also succeeded in persuading the Soviet Union to conduct negotiations on Cambodia in the ninth round of negotiations between the USSR and China.

However, amid positive diplomatic signals, the situation at the frontier suddenly intensified. On 14 October 1986, Vietnam accused China of firing 35,000 shells into Vị Xuyên and making a territorial encroachment. The Vietnamese also claimed to have repelled three Chinese charges against Hill 1100 and the Thanh Thủy Bridge. This development was possibly a Chinese reaction either to the Soviet Union's refusal to raise pressure on Vietnam to withdraw from Cambodia, or to Vietnamese plans for military activity in Cambodia during the dry season. In January 1987, China fired some tens of thousands of shells (60,000 shells on 7 January alone) and launched 15 division-sized attacks against Vietnamese positions on Hills 233, 685, 1509, and 1100. Vietnam put the number of Chinese casualties in these attacks at 1,500. The Chinese, on the other hand, claimed to have inflicted 500 casualties on the Vietnamese; they also denied the Vietnamese claim, but admitted that Chinese forces had suffered "considerable losses". On 5 October 1987, a MiG-21 fighter jet of the Vietnam People's Air Force was shot down over the Chinese Longzhou County, Guangxi Province.

According to Carlyle A. Thayer, this wave of fighting had the nature of a "phony war". Despite heavy clashes in Vị Xuyên, the situation in other border provinces was relatively calm, and the Chinese did not deploy any of their regular units into the fight. The order of battle of both sides remained unchanged during this period of the conflict.

== 1988: Johnson South Reef Skirmish ==
On 14 March 1988, a naval battle was fought between the Vietnam People's Navy and the People's Liberation Army Navy within the Spratly Islands while the PLAN was conducting a survey expedition as part of the UNESCO Intergovernmental Oceanographic Commission global oceanic surveys project. Chinese and Vietnamese sources differ regarding which side shot first. At least 64 Vietnamese soldiers killed and three Vietnamese naval vessels lost. China established control over six significant landmarks including Johnson South Reef.

== Aftermath ==
During the five-year period from 1984 to 1989, the Chinese had fired over 2 million artillery rounds in Hà Giang Province, mainly in the area of 20 square kilometres (7.7 sq mi) of Thanh Thủy and Thạnh Đức Communes. The situation was quiet at the town of Hà Giang, 16 kilometres (9.9 mi) south of the battle sites, without any considerable barrage.

From April 1987, the PLA began to scale down their military operations, yet still routinely patrolled the Laoshan and Zheyinshan areas. From April 1987 to October 1989, they conducted only 11 attacks, mostly artillery strikes. By 1992, China had formally pulled out its troops from Laoshan and Zheyinshan. The withdrawal had been gradually carried out since 1989. Atop Laoshan, the Chinese built concrete bunkers and a memorial after the conflict. Only earthen structures remained on the Vietnamese sector, which has been delineated and returned to Vietnam under the 2009 Border Agreement between the two countries. China and Vietnam negotiated the normalization of their relations in a secretive summit in Chengdu in September 1990 and officially normalized ties in November 1991.

As part of efforts to develop border trade between the two countries, the PLA began large scale mine-clearing operations along the border in 1993.

Thousands of people from both sides were killed in these border clashes. At the military cemetery in Vị Xuyên, there are more than 1,600 graves of Vietnamese soldiers killed during the conflict. Vietnam acknowledged 4,000 killed and 9,000 wounded in the area between 1984 and 1989. The Chinese confirmed their corresponding casualty figure as 4,100, including over 2,000 war dead.

== See also ==
- China–Vietnam relations
