= Sino-Vietnamese War =

War between China and Vietnam in 1979

- Part of the Third Indochina War, the Sino-Soviet split, the Cold War in Asia and aftermath of the Cambodian–Vietnamese War
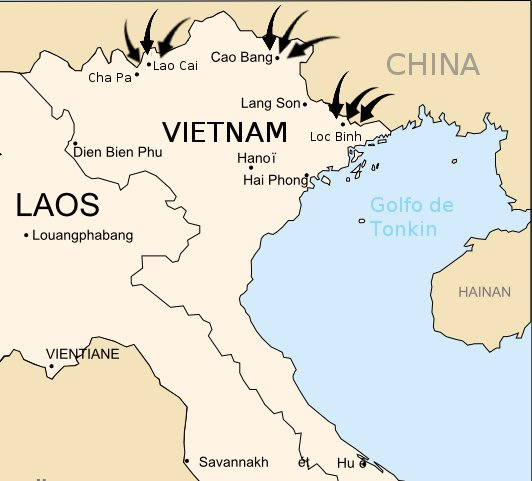
- Map of Vietnamese cities that were attacked by China
Date	17 February – 16 March 1979 (3 weeks and 6 days)
Location	China–Vietnam border, Northwest Vietnam, Northeast Vietnam
Result	Status quo ante bellum, both sides claim victory

Belligerents
China	Vietnam

Commanders and leaders
Hua Guofeng (CCP Chairman, Premier); Deng Xiaoping (PLA Chief of Staff); Ye Jianying (National Congress Chairman); Xu Xiangqian (Defense Minister); Yang Dezhi (Commander of the Kunming Military Region); Xu Shiyou (Commander of the Guangzhou Military Region)	Lê Duẩn (General Secretary); Võ Nguyên Giáp (Defence Minister); Tôn Đức Thắng (President); Văn Tiến Dũng (Commander in Chief); Đàm Quang Trung (Commander of the First Military Region); Vũ Lập (Commander of the Second Military Region)

Strength
Chinese data: 200,000 soldiers; 400–550 tanks and 60 APCs; Vietnamese data: 600,000 soldiers	70,000–100,000 soldiers; 150,000 irregulars and militia

Casualties and losses
Chinese data: 6,954 killed (other sources 8,531 killed); 14,800 – 21,000 wounded; 238 captured; 76 tanks/APCs destroyed, 533 damaged; Vietnamese data: 62,000 casualties, including 26,000 deaths; 420 tanks/APCs destroyed 66 heavy mortars and guns destroyed; Western estimate: 26,000 killed; 37,000 wounded; 260 captured	Vietnamese data: 7,000 soldiers killed and an additional 4,000 missing; 10,000 civilians were killed; Chinese data: 42,000–57,000 soldiers killed; 70,000 militia killed; 1,636 captured; 185 tanks/APCs destroyed; 200 heavy mortars and guns destroyed; 6 missile launchers destroyed; Western estimate: 30,000 killed; 32,000 wounded; 1,638 captured

Sino-Vietnamese War

Chinese name
- Simplified Chinese: 中越战争
- Traditional Chinese: 中越戰爭
Transcriptions
Standard Mandarin
- Hanyu Pinyin: Zhōng Yuè zhànzhēng

Official name in the PRC
- Simplified Chinese: 对越自卫反击战
- Traditional Chinese: 對越自衛反擊戰
- Literal meaning: Self-defensive counterattack against Vietnam
Transcriptions
Standard Mandarin
- Hanyu Pinyin: duì yuè zìwèi fǎnjī zhàn
- Wade–Giles: tui yüeh tzu-wei fan-chi chan
- IPA: [twêɪ ɥê tsɹ̩̂wêɪ fàntɕí ʈʂân]
Yue: Cantonese
- Jyutping: deoi3 jyut6 zi6 wai6 faan2 gik1 zin3

Vietnamese name
- Vietnamese: Chiến tranh biên giới Việt-Trung
- Hán-Nôm: 戰爭邊界越中
- Literal meaning: Vietnamese-Chinese border war

The Sino-Vietnamese War (also known by other names) was a war which occurred in early 1979 between China and Vietnam. China launched an offensive ostensibly in response to Vietnam's invasion and occupation of Cambodia in 1978, which ended the rule of the Khmer Rouge. The conflict lasted for about a month, with China withdrawing its troops in March 1979.

In February 1979, Chinese forces launched a surprise invasion of northern Vietnam and quickly captured several cities near the border. On 6 March of that year, China declared that its punitive mission had been accomplished. Chinese troops then withdrew from Vietnam. Vietnam continued to occupy Cambodia until 1989, suggesting that China failed to achieve one of its stated aims of dissuading Vietnam from involvement in Cambodia. China's operation at least forced Vietnam to withdraw the 2nd Corps from the invasion forces of Cambodia to reinforce the defense of Hanoi. Additionally, it demonstrated that the Soviet Union, China's Cold War communist adversary, was unable to protect its Vietnamese ally. The conflict had a lasting impact on the relationship between China and Vietnam, and diplomatic relations between the two countries were not fully restored until 1991, following the withdrawal of Vietnamese troops from Cambodia and the dissolution of the Soviet Union. The Sino-Vietnamese land border was formally agreed upon in 1999.

== Names ==
The Sino-Vietnamese War is known by various names in Chinese and Vietnamese. The neutral names for the war are 中越战争 (Sino-Vietnamese war) in Chinese and "Chiến tranh biên giới Việt-Trung" (Vietnamese-Chinese border war) in Vietnamese. The Chinese government refers to the war as the "China-Vietnam border self-defense counterattack operations" (中越边境自卫还击作战) or the "Self-defensive counterattack operations against Vietnam to protect the border" (对越自卫还击保卫边疆作战). Chinese non-official sources generally use a shorter form, "Self-defensive counterattack against Vietnam" (对越自卫反击战). The Vietnamese Government and Communist Party generally calls it the "Northern Frontier Defense War" (Chiến tranh Bảo vệ Biên giới phía Bắc).

The Sino-Vietnamese War is also known as the Third Indochina War in Western historiography.

== Background ==
Just as the First Indochina War—which emerged from the complex situation following World War II—and the Vietnam War arose from the indecisive aftermath of political relations, the Third Indochina War again followed the unresolved problems of the earlier wars.

=== Sino-Soviet split ===
The Chinese Communist Party and the Viet Minh had a long history. During the initial stages of the First Indochina War with France, the recently founded communist China continued the Soviet mission to expand communism. Therefore, they aided the Viet Minh and became the connector between Soviets and the Viet Minh.

After the death of Joseph Stalin in March 1953, relations between the Soviet Union and China began to deteriorate. Mao Zedong believed the new Soviet leader Khrushchev had made a serious error in his Secret Speech denouncing Stalin in February 1956, and criticized the Soviet Union's interpretation of Marxism–Leninism, in particular Khrushchev's support for peaceful coexistence and its interpretation. This led to increasingly hostile relations, and eventually the Sino-Soviet split. From here, Chinese communists played a decreasing role in helping their former allies because the Viet Minh did not support China against the Soviets.

Following worsening relations between the Soviet Union and China as a result of the Sino-Soviet split of 1956–1966, as many as 1.5 million Chinese troops were stationed along the Sino-Soviet border in preparation for a full-scale war against the Soviets.

Vietnam joined the Council for Mutual Economic Assistance (CMEA) on June 28, 1978. Soviet military aid to Vietnam increased from $75-$125 million in 1977 to $600-$800 million in 1978. On November 3, 1978, Vietnam and the Soviet Union signed a formal military alliance. The Soviet Union supported Vietnam's invasion of Cambodia, launched in December 1978.

Following the death of Mao in September 1976, the overthrow of the Gang of Four and the ascent of Deng Xiaoping, the Chinese leadership started the reform and opening up to transition to a market economy, denounced the Cultural Revolution, and collaborated with the US against the Soviet Union.

=== Vietnam War ===
As France withdrew from a provisionally divided Vietnam in late 1954, the United States increasingly stepped in to support the South Vietnamese leaders due to the Domino theory, which theorized that if one nation would turn to communism, the surrounding nations were likely to fall like dominoes and become communist as well. The Soviet Union and North Vietnam became important allies together due to the fact that if South Vietnam was successfully taken over by North Vietnam, then communism in East Asia would find its strategic position bolstered. In the eyes of the PR China, the growing Soviet-Vietnamese relationship was a disturbing development; they feared an encirclement by the less-than-hospitable Soviet sphere of influence.

The United States and the Soviet Union could not agree on a plan for a proposed 1956 election meant to unify the partitioned Vietnam. Instead, the South held a separate election that was widely considered fraudulent, leading to continued internal conflict with communist factions led by the Viet Cong that intensified through the late 1950s. With supplies and support from the Soviet Union, North Vietnamese forces became directly involved in the ongoing guerrilla war by 1959 and openly invaded the South in 1964.

The United States played an ever-increasing role in supporting South Vietnam through the period. The U.S. had supported French forces in the First Indochina War, sent supplies and military advisers to South Vietnam throughout the 1950s and early 1960s, and eventually took over most of the fighting against both North Vietnam and the Viet Cong by the mid-1960s. By 1968, over 500,000 American troops were involved in the Vietnam War. On 20 January 1969, Richard Nixon became US President. Due to a lack of clear military success and facing increasingly strident opposition to the war in the U.S., American forces began a slow withdrawal in 1969 while attempting to bolster South Vietnam's military so that they could take over the fighting. In accordance with the Paris Peace Accords by 29 March 1973 all U.S. combat forces had left South Vietnam, however North Vietnamese combat forces were allowed to remain in place. North Vietnam attacked South Vietnam in early 1975 and South Vietnam fell on 30 April 1975.

The PR China started talks with the United States in the early 1970s, culminating in high level meetings with Henry Kissinger and later Richard Nixon. These meetings contributed to a re-orientation of Chinese foreign policy toward the United States. After Nixon's resignation on August 9, 1974, Gerald Ford became US President.

=== Cambodia ===
Although the Vietnamese Communists and the Khmer Rouge had previously cooperated, the relationship deteriorated when Khmer Rouge leader Pol Pot came to power and established Democratic Kampuchea on 17 April 1975. The PR China, on the other hand, also supported the Maoist Khmer Rouge against Lon Nol's regime during the Cambodian Civil War and its subsequent take-over of Cambodia. China provided extensive political, logistical and military support for the Khmer Rouge during its rule. After numerous clashes along the border between Vietnam and Cambodia, and with encouragement from Khmer Rouge defectors fleeing purges of the Eastern Zone, Vietnam invaded Cambodia on 25 December 1978. By 7 January 1979, Vietnamese forces had entered Phnom Penh and the Khmer Rouge leadership had fled to western Cambodia. The offensive took the Chinese by surprise, and its Phnom Penh embassy fled to the jungle with the Khmer Rouge where it remained for 15 days.

However, the fall of the Khmer Rouge was not a surprise, but from China's perspective, Vietnam's occupation of Cambodia threatened China's interests on the Indochina peninsula and its position among non-communist Association of Southeast Asian Nations (ASEAN) states of Southeast Asia. Members of ASEAN saw Vietnam's invasion of Cambodia as a blatant violation of international borders and an act of aggression.

=== Ethnic minorities ===
China supported the ethnic minority United Front for the Liberation of Oppressed Races against Vietnam during the FULRO insurgency against Vietnam.

The Vietnamese executed collaborators who worked for the Chinese, regardless of ethnicity.

The Chinese received a significant number of defectors from the Thu Lao ethnic minority in Vietnam during the war. During the war China received as migrants the entire A Lù based population of the Phù Lá ethnic minority. China received so many defectors from the ethnic minorities in Vietnam that it raised shock among Vietnam which had to launch a new effort to re-assert dominance over the ethnic minorities and classify them. Post Vietnam War, an insurgency against Vietnam lasted among the indigenous Mon-Khmer and Malayo-Polynesians of the Central Highlands. Assistance was sought from China by the Hmong ethnic minority. The border was frequently crossed by Chinese, Lao, Kinh, Hmong, Yao, Nung, and Tai. The Laotian Hmong and FULRO were both supported against Vietnam by China and Thailand.

In February 1976, Vietnam implemented registration programs in the south. Ethnic Chinese in Vietnam were required to adopt Vietnamese citizenship or leave the country. In early 1977, Vietnam implemented what it described as a purification policy in its border areas to keep Chinese border residents to the Chinese side of the border. Following another discriminatory policy introduced in March 1978, a large number of Chinese fled from Vietnam to southern China. China and Vietnam attempted to negotiate issues related to Vietnam's treatment of ethnic Chinese, but these negotiations failed to resolve the issues.

=== Border disputes ===
Border disputes between the two countries were significant in the 1970s. One hundred sixty-four locations on the land border totaling 227 square kilometers were disputed. Because there was not yet clear border demarcation, the countries engaged in a pattern of retaliatory land grabs and violence. The number of border skirmishes increased yearly from 125 in 1974 to 2,175 in 1978. Two rounds of bilateral negotiations on border issues were unsuccessful. While the second round of negotiations, the August 1978 Youyi Pass Incident occurred, in which the Vietnamese army and police expelled 2,500 refugees across the border into China. Vietnamese authorities beat and stabbed refugees during the incident, including 9 Chinese civilian border workers.

After the second round of negotiations failed, China began conducting overflights of the border area and of the Gulf of Tonkin.

=== China attacks Vietnam ===
By the mid-1970s, the relationship between China and Vietnam was strained. The tensions between the two countries developed in relation to a number of issues, including Vietnam's support of the Soviet side during the Sino-Soviet split, Vietnam's invasion of Cambodia, Vietnam's mistreatment of ethnic Chinese in Vietnam, and border conflicts.

China grew concerned about the strong Soviet influence in Vietnam, fearing that Vietnam could become a pseudo-protectorate of the Soviet Union. Vietnam's claim to be the world's third largest military power following its victory in the Vietnam War also increased Chinese apprehensions. In the Chinese view, Vietnam was pursuing a regional hegemonic policy in an attempt to control Indochina.

In June 1978, China rescinded the appointment of its consul general to Ho Chi Minh City and informed Vietnam that it must close three of its consulates in China.

On 8 July 1978, the General Political Bureau of the Vietnamese People's Army released orders to adopt an offensive strategy against China, including attacking and counterattacking within and beyond the border. Two weeks later, the National Congress of the Communist Party of Vietnam described China as a direct and dangerous enemy and a "new combat target". It decided to send personnel abroad to engage in activities in opposition to China.

In July 1978, the Politburo of the Chinese Communist Party discussed possible military action against Vietnam in order to disrupt Soviet deployments and, two months later, PLA General Staff recommended punitive actions against Vietnam. By the end of July 1978, China ended all of its aid programs to Vietnam and recalled all of its experts from Vietnam.

In September 1978, the People's Liberation Army (PLA) General Staff reached a consensus in favor of a military campaign against Vietnam. The General Staff viewed the goal of a campaign as to force Vietnam out of Cambodia, to check the Soviet Union's and Vietnam's regional ambitions in southeast Asia, and to stop Vietnamese encroachments on the border.

The major breakdown in the Chinese view of Vietnam occurred in November 1978. Vietnam joined the CMEA and, on 3 November, the Soviet Union and Vietnam signed a 25-year mutual defense treaty, which made Vietnam the "linchpin" in the Soviet Union's "drive to contain China". (However, the Soviet Union had shifted from open animosity towards more normalized relations with China soon after.) Vietnam called for a special relationship between the three Indochinese countries, but the Khmer Rouge regime of Democratic Kampuchea rejected the idea.

On 8 December 1978, the Central Military Commission ordered the Guangzhou Military Region and Kunming Military Region to prepare for military action against Vietnam by 10 January 1979.

On 25 December 1978, Vietnam invaded Democratic Kampuchea, overrunning most of the country, deposing the Khmer Rouge, and installing Heng Samrin as the head of the new Cambodian government. The move further antagonized China, which now viewed the Soviet Union as capable of encircling its southern border.

Beginning in fall 1978 and continuing through early 1979, Deng Xiaoping made a series of international trips, one goal of which was to gauge world opinion on the issues between China and Vietnam. On 29 January 1979, Deng Xiaoping visited the United States for the first time, and sought an endorsement from the United States in order to deter the Soviet Union from intervening when China launched a punitive attack against Vietnam. He informed Carter that China could not accept Vietnam's "wild ambitions" and was prepared to teach it a lesson. According to United States National Security Advisor Zbigniew Brzezinski, Carter reserved judgment, an action which Chinese diplomats interpreted as tacit approval.

Deng returned to China on 8 February 1979, and on 9 February, made the final decision to invade Vietnam. On 11 February, China issued orders to the Guangxi and Yunnan military commands to launch the attack on 17 February. Three days later, the Central Committee of the Chinese Communist Party issued a notice to provincial party organizations, military regions, and government ministries, announcing and explaining its view of the justifications for the upcoming attack on Vietnam. On 15 February, the first day that China could have officially announced the termination of the 1950 Sino-Soviet Treaty of Friendship, Alliance and Mutual Assistance, Deng Xiaoping declared that China planned to conduct a limited attack on Vietnam. Thus, he further developed China's burgeoning cooperation with the United States against the Soviet Union and would take a similar stance later regarding Afghanistan. According to academic Suisheng Zhao, "[t]he proximity in the timing of the military thrust against Vietnam, was to take advantage of the normalization to bluff the Soviets with a nonexistent US endorsement."

The reason cited for the attack was to support China's ally, the Khmer Rouge of Cambodia, in addition to the mistreatment of Vietnam's ethnic Chinese minority and the Vietnamese occupation of the Spratly Islands which were claimed by China. To prevent Soviet intervention on Vietnam's behalf, Deng warned Moscow the next day that China was prepared for a full-scale war against the Soviet Union; in preparation for this conflict, China put all of its troops along the Sino-Soviet border on an emergency war alert, set up a new military command in Xinjiang, and evacuated an estimated 300,000 civilians from the Sino-Soviet border. In addition, the bulk of China's active forces (as many as one-and-a-half million troops) were stationed along China's border with the Soviet Union.

The 17 February issue of People's Daily accuses Vietnam of discrimination against ethnic Chinese populations, of preparing to invade China, and of shooting at civilians and their properties from across the border on its front page. Another article, also on the front page, claims that the Foreign Ministry sent a diplomatic note expressing "the strongest protest" for Vietnamese incursions on Chinese soil.

== Course of war ==
On 17 February 1979, a People's Liberation Army (PLA) force of about 200,000 troops supported by 200 Type 59, Type 62, and Type 63 tanks entered northern Vietnam in the PLA's first major combat operation since the end of the China-India War in 1962.

The PLA invasion was conducted in two directions:

- Eastern direction, commanded by Xu Shiyou, aimed to attack Cao Bằng, Lạng Sơn and Quảng Ninh Provinces.
- Western direction, commanded by Yang Dezhi, aimed to attack Ha Tuyen, Hoang Lien Son and Lai Châu Provinces.

Vietnam quickly mobilized all its main forces in Cambodia, southern Vietnam and central Vietnam to the northern border. From 18 to 25 February, the 327th Infantry Division of 3rd Military Region and the 337th Infantry Division of 4th Military Region were deployed to join 1st Military Region for the defense of northwestern region. From 6 to 11 March the 2nd Corps (Huong Giang Corps) stationed in Cambodia was deployed back to Hanoi.

The 372nd Air Division in central Vietnam as well as the 917th, 935th and 937th Air Regiments in southern Vietnam were quickly deployed to the north.

The PLA quickly advanced about 15–20 kilometres into Vietnam, with fighting mainly occurring in the provinces of Cao Bằng, Lào Cai and Lạng Sơn. The Vietnamese avoided mobilizing their regular divisions, and held back some 300,000 troops for the defence of Hanoi. The People's Army of Vietnam (VPA) tried to avoid direct combat and often used guerrilla tactics.

The initial PLA attack soon lost its momentum and a new attack wave was sent in with eight PLA divisions joining the battle. After capturing the northern heights above Lạng Sơn, the PLA surrounded and paused in front of the city in order to lure the VPA into reinforcing it with units from Cambodia. This was the main strategic ploy in the Chinese war plan as Deng did not want to risk escalating tensions with the Soviet Union. After three days of bloody house-to-house fighting, Lạng Sơn fell on 6 March. The PLA then took the southern heights above Lạng Sơn and occupied Sa Pa. The PLA claimed to have crushed several of the VPA regular units. Attacks were also conducted by the PLA at Quảng Ninh Province in the Battle of Mong Cai and Battle of Cao Ba Lanh but were unsuccessful. The Chinese captured the far northeastern provincial capital, Mong Cai, but suffered heavy casualties. According to Vietnam, prior to the war, Chinese forces performed numerous reconnaissance activities across the border in January 1979 and made 230 violations into Vietnamese land. To prepare for a possible Chinese invasion, the Central Military Commission of the Communist Party of Vietnam ordered all armed forces across the border to be on stand-by mode.

On 6 March, China declared that the gate to Hanoi was open and that their punitive mission had been achieved. Coincidentally, the Vietnamese government called, on the same day, for a nationwide general mobilization for the war. Some analysts said that the belligerent Vietnamese language could indicate a desire to counterattack, or simply an attempt to mount a propaganda campaign that would end in a declaration of Vietnamese victory as the Chinese leave the country. During the withdrawal, the PLA used a scorched-earth policy, destroying local infrastructure and looting useful equipment and resources (including livestock), which severely weakened the economy of Vietnam's northernmost provinces. The PLA crossed the border back into China on 16 March. Both sides declared victory with China claiming to have crushed the Vietnamese resistance and Vietnam claiming to have repelled the invasion using mostly border militias. Writing in 2002, Henry J. Kenny described the view that Vietnam had outperformed the PLA on the battlefield as one held by Western writers, while noting that the PLA's capture of Lang Son gave China the option of advancing through the Red River Delta toward Hanoi. However, Kenny also mentions that Lang Son is farther from Hanoi than it is from the Chinese border, and at least five PAVN divisions in the delta remained ready for a counterattack and thirty thousand additional PAVN troops from Cambodia along with several regiments from Laos were moving to their support. Thus, had the PLA decided to attack Hanoi, the PLA would have suffered huge losses.

Contrary to the views above, The New York Times reported that Western intelligence analysts believed that even though the border war was ending, regular troops had to replace provincial Vietnamese troops who suffered high casualties and became disorganized as a result of taking the brunt of the invasion. Vietnam sent one regular division, as well as armor and artillery support units, into the fight at the height of the fighting for Lang Son, which was captured by Chinese forces, but the regular division failed to take the town. The Chinese made their withdrawal announcement following their victory at Lang Son, which Hanoi refused to recognize. Analysts interpreted this as a warning to Vietnam that any military objective there may be taken by China. Analysts claimed that regardless of the outcome of the combat, China had managed to permanently divert Vietnamese troops, supplies, attention, and energy to the border region. This was due to Vietnam's intensive resupply and remanning of the border zone.

Despite using a force that did not see major combat since the early 1950s and whose weaponry was inferior to the Vietnamese weaponry, the PLA was considered to have fought well. Most of the weaponry and military vehicles used by the PLA were either obsolete or unfit for combat. In contrast, the Vietnamese forces had a combat-seasoned force and modern weaponry from America and the Soviet Union. The PLA pushed Vietnamese forces 25 miles (40 km) from the border and succeeded in severely damaging the area they occupied.

=== Soviet support to Vietnam ===
The Soviet Union, although it did not take direct military action, provided intelligence and equipment support for Vietnam. A large airlift was established by the Soviet Union to move Vietnamese troops from Cambodia to Northern Vietnam. Moscow also provided a total of 400 tanks and armored personnel carriers (APCs), 500 mortar artillery and air defense artillery, 50 BM-21 rocket launchers, 400 portable surface-to-air missiles, 800 anti-tank missiles and 20 jet fighters. About 5,000 to 8,000 Soviet military advisers were present in Vietnam in 1979 to train Vietnamese soldiers.

During the Sino-Vietnamese War, the Soviet Union deployed troops at the Sino-Soviet border and Mongolian-Chinese border as an act of showing support to Vietnam, as well as tying up Chinese troops. However, the Soviets refused to take any direct action to defend their ally.

The Soviet Pacific Fleet also deployed 15 ships to the Vietnamese coast to relay Chinese battlefield communications to Vietnamese forces.

==== Soviet inaction ====
While the Soviet Union deployed naval vessels and supplied materiel to Vietnam, they felt that there was simply no way that they could directly support Vietnam against China; the distances were too great to be an effective ally, and any sort of reinforcements would have to cross territory controlled by China or U.S. allies. The only realistic option would be to restart the unresolved border conflict with China. Vietnam was important to Soviet policy but not enough for the Soviets to go to war over. When Moscow did not intervene, Beijing publicly proclaimed that the Soviet Union had broken its numerous promises to assist Vietnam.

Another reason why Moscow did not intervene was because Beijing had promised both Moscow and Washington that the invasion was only a limited war, and that Chinese forces would withdraw after a short incursion. After moderation by the U.S., Moscow decided to adopt a "wait and see" approach to see if Beijing would actually limit their offense. Because Vietnam's anti-air capabilities were among the best in the world at the time and in order to reassure Moscow it was conducting a limited war, Deng Xiaoping ordered the Chinese PLA navy and air force to remain out of the war; only limited support was provided by the air force. When Beijing kept its promise, Moscow did not retaliate.

== International reactions ==
On 22 February 1979, Xinhua News Agency compiled the attitudes of various countries toward the Sino-Vietnamese War:

Attitudes of various countries
Reaction	Country
Condemning China, supporting Vietnam, and demanding that China withdraw its troops and cease fire	Afghanistan, Albania, Angola, Benin, Bulgaria, People's Republic of the Congo, Cuba, Czechoslovakia, East Germany, Ethiopia, Hungary, People's Republic of Kampuchea, Mongolia, Mozambique, Poland, South Yemen, Soviet Union
Expressing regret to China and demanding that China withdraw its troops	India, Laos
Opposing military actions by China and Vietnam	Canada, New Zealand, Sweden
Demanding that China withdraw its troops from Vietnam and Vietnam withdraw its troops from Cambodia	Australia, Finland, Indonesia, Iraq, Italy, Japan, Malaysia, Netherlands, Norway, Philippines, Romania, Singapore, Thailand, United Kingdom, United States, Yugoslavia
Expressing regret to both China and Vietnam, and hoping that Vietnam and Cambodia can control their own destiny	Austria, Belgium, France, Greece, Ireland, Luxembourg, Spain, Switzerland, West Germany
Calling for negotiations to resolve the issue	Bangladesh, Cyprus, Denmark, Egypt, Iceland, Libya, Madagascar, Mali
Public statement without comment	Portugal
Only condemning Vietnam	North Korea
Supporting China and condemning Vietnam	Democratic Kampuchea

== Aftermath ==
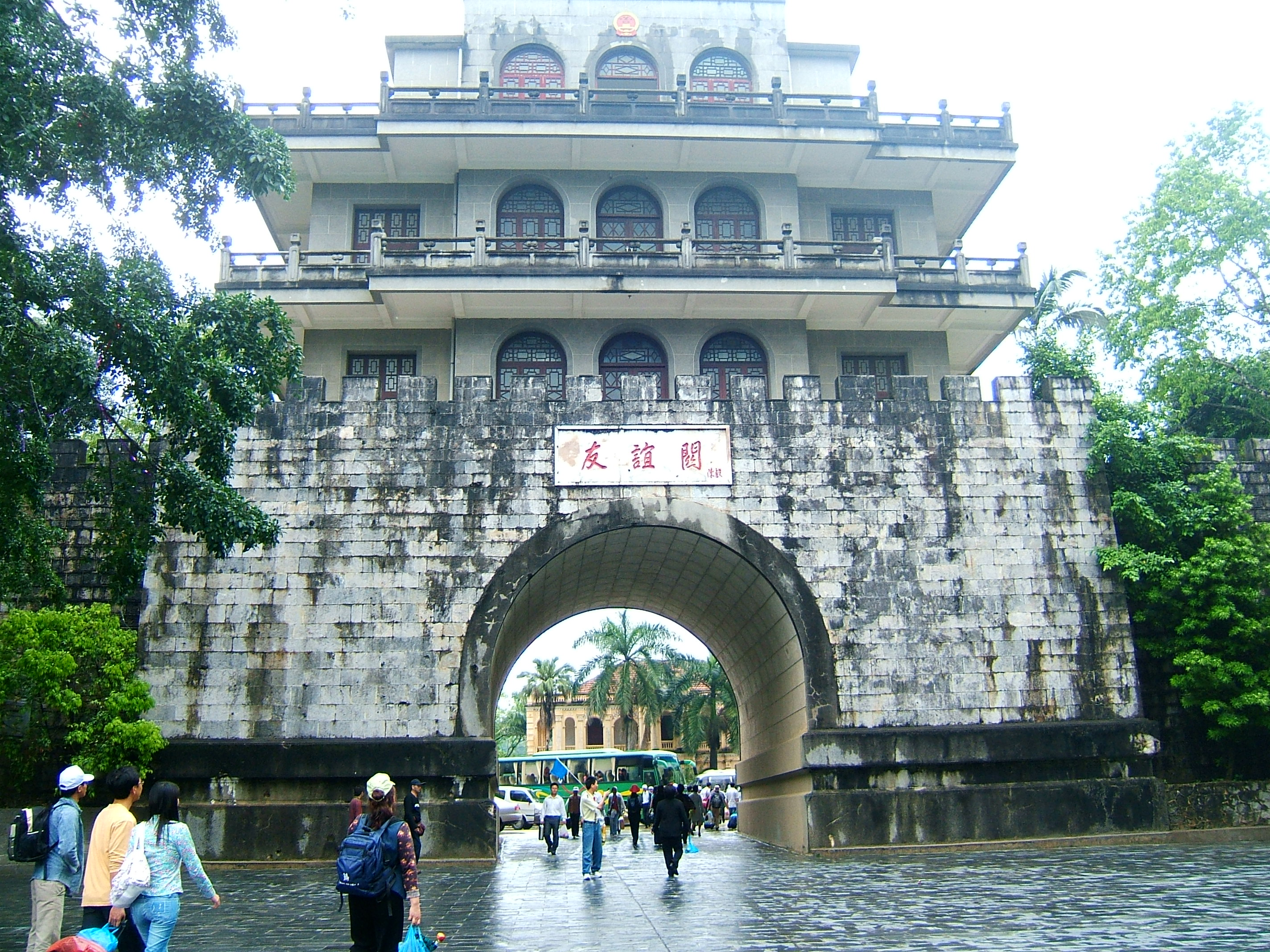
Nam Quan Gate

China and Vietnam each lost thousands of troops, and China lost 3.45 billion yuan in overhead, which delayed completion of their 1979–80 economic plan. Following the war, the Vietnamese leadership took various repressive measures to deal with the problem of real or potential collaboration. In the spring of 1979, the authorities expelled approximately 8,000 Hoa people from Hanoi to the southern "New Economic Zones", and partially resettled the Hmong tribes and other ethnic minorities from the northernmost provinces. In response to the defection of Hoàng Văn Hoan, the Communist Party of Vietnam removed from its ranks pro-Chinese elements and persons who had surrendered to the advancing Chinese troops during the war. In 1979, a total of 20,468 members were expelled from the party.

After the invasion, Vietnam created a puppet government in Cambodia led by Heng Samrin. Samrin was obligated to consult with the Vietnamese on major decisions. Although Vietnam continued to occupy Cambodia, China successfully mobilized international opposition to the occupation, rallying such leaders as Cambodia's deposed king Norodom Sihanouk, Cambodian anticommunist leader Son Sann, and high-ranking members of the Khmer Rouge to deny the pro-Vietnamese Cambodian People's Party in Cambodia diplomatic recognition beyond the Soviet bloc.

The majority of diplomats and analysts concluded that China's long-term strategy was to stretch Vietnamese resources by having the Vietnamese divert their resources from other problems to the border conflict. Problems include Vietnam's difficulties integrating South Vietnam with the North, the burden of administrating Laos and occupying Cambodia, and economic problems caused by two years of disastrous weather.

After the war, border skirmishes at the Chinese-Vietnamese border continued, and the Vietnamese were not deterred from maintaining their occupation of Cambodia, increasing its control over Laos and threatening the security of Thailand, which turned Vietnam into a greater threat to ASEAN than before. Also, the Vietnamese government intensified its persecution of overseas Chinese living in Vietnam. Vietnamese authorities confiscated property owned in Vietnam by overseas Chinese, and expelled many Chinese from Vietnam to a number of provinces in southern China.

However, China caused Vietnam to suffer from serious economic and military hardship by threatening to launch a second invasion, and by supporting Pol Pot guerrillas in Cambodia. The Vietnamese government had to spend money on maintaining a military presence at the Chinese-Vietnamese border, and on supporting its puppet government in Cambodia. Vietnam's scarce resources were drained, and economic conditions were bad throughout Vietnam.

Assessments of the strategic consequences of the war vary considerably. Journalist Howard W. French reported some historians and others speculated that "the war was started by Mr. Deng" – China's then paramount leader – "to keep the army preoccupied ... in a cynical political game ... to quell internal conflict." However, China strengthened its relations with ASEAN countries – particularly Thailand and Singapore – due to their fear of Vietnamese aggression. Singapore's Prime Minister Lee Kuan Yew wrote in 2000: "The Western press wrote off the Chinese punitive action as a failure. I believe it changed the history of East Asia." In contrast, Vietnam's decreasing prestige in the region led it to be more dependent on the Soviet Union, to which it leased a naval base at Cam Ranh Bay. Former U.S. Secretary of State Henry Kissinger wrote that "China succeeded in exposing the limits of...[Soviet] strategic reach" and speculated that the desire to "compensate for their ineffectuality" contributed to the Soviets' decision to intervene in Afghanistan a year later.

=== Chinese casualties ===
The number of casualties during the war is disputed. Shortly after China had announced the withdrawal of its troops from Vietnam, the state-run Vietnam News Agency claimed that the PLA had suffered over 44,000 casualties, a figure which Western analysts at the time considered to be greatly inflated. Other Vietnamese sources claimed the PLA had suffered 62,500 total casualties, including 550 military vehicles and 115 artillery pieces destroyed. Leaks from Chinese military sources indicate that China suffered 6,954 dead.

Deputy chief of the General Staff Wu Xiuquan revealed in a meeting with a French military delegation that Vietnam suffered 50,000 casualties, whereas China had suffered 20,000 casualties. Regardless of the accuracy of the Vietnamese casualties, it can be concluded that the Chinese losses were severe, according to Daniel Tretiak.

=== Vietnamese casualties ===
Like their Chinese counterparts, the Vietnamese government has never officially announced any information on its actual military casualties. China estimated that Vietnam lost 57,000 soldiers and 70,000 militia members during the war. The Vietnamese state newspaper Nhân Dân claimed that Vietnam suffered more than 10,000 civilian deaths during the Chinese invasion and earlier on 17 May 1979, reported statistics on heavy losses of industry and agricultural properties.

=== Prisoners ===
Captured Vietnamese soldiers at a Chinese prison camp

The Chinese held 1,636 Vietnamese prisoners and the Vietnamese held 238 Chinese prisoners; they were exchanged in May–June 1979.

=== PLA reforms ===
Deng subsequently used the PLA's poor performance to overcome resistance from PLA leadership to further military reforms.

=== Sino-Vietnamese relations after the war ===
Border skirmishes continued throughout the 1980s, including a significant skirmish in April 1984 and a naval battle over the Spratly Islands in 1988 known as the Johnson South Reef Skirmish. Armed conflict only ended in 1989 after the Vietnamese agreed to fully withdraw from Cambodia. Both nations planned the normalization of their relations in a secret summit in Chengdu in September 1990, and officially normalized ties in November 1991.

In 1999, after many years of negotiations, China and Vietnam signed a border pact. There was an adjustment of the land border, resulting in Vietnam giving China part of its land which was lost during the battle, including the Ai Nam Quan Gate which served as the traditional border marker and entry point between Vietnam and China, which caused widespread frustration within Vietnamese communities.

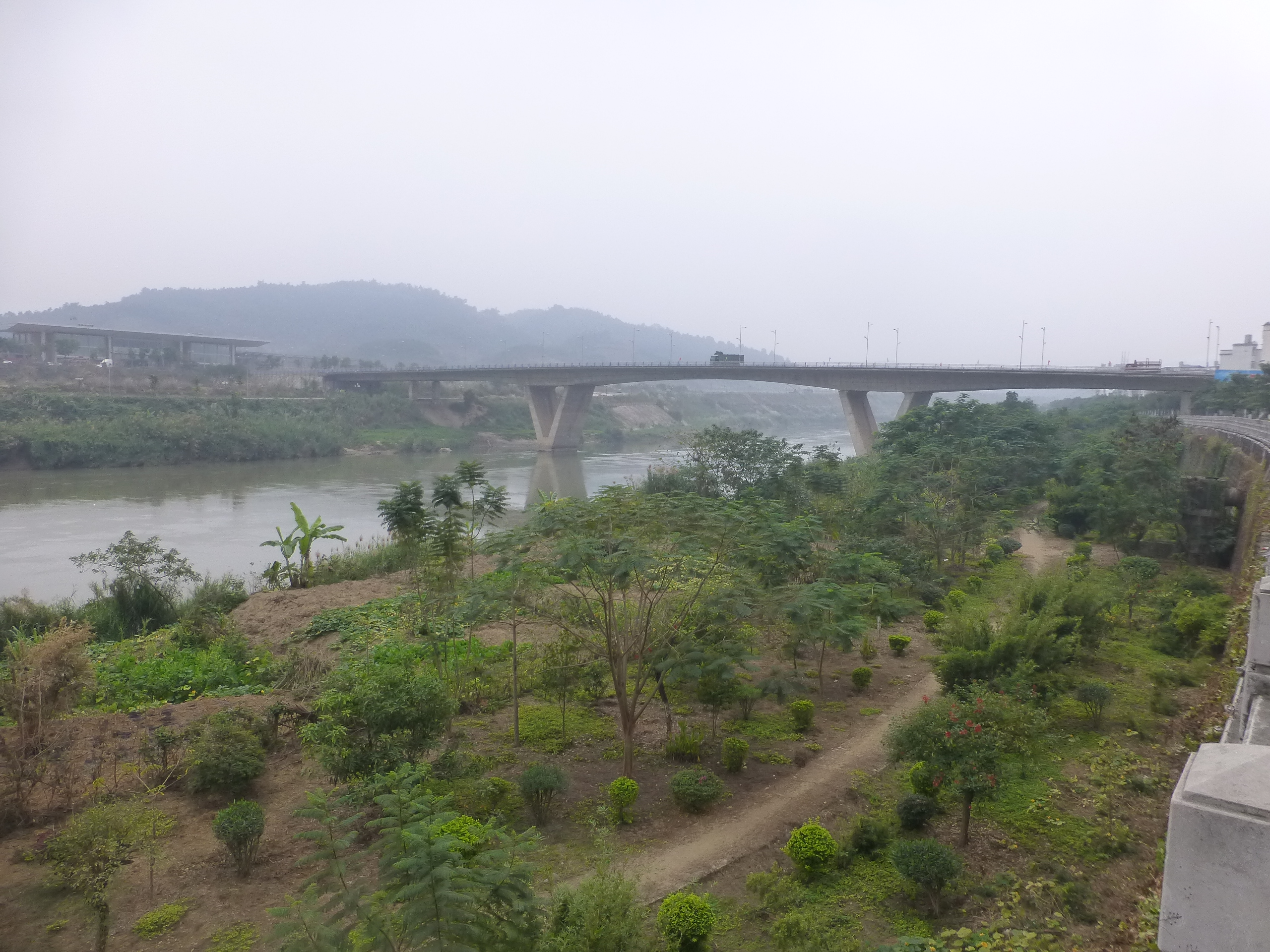
A new bridge spanning the Red River between Hekou and Kim Thành, on the main road between Kunming and Hanoi

The December 2007 announcement of a plan to build a Hanoi–Kunming highway was a landmark in Sino-Vietnamese relations. The road will traverse the border that once served as a battleground. It is predicted to contribute to demilitarizing the border region, as well as facilitating trade and industrial cooperation between the nations.

== In popular culture ==
=== Chinese media ===
There are a number of Chinese songs, movies and TV programs depicting and discussing this conflict from the Chinese viewpoint. These vary from the patriotic song "Bloodstained Glory" originally written to laud the sacrifice and service of the Chinese military, to the 1986 film The Big Parade which carried veiled criticism of the war. The 1984 Xie Jin film Wreaths at the Foot of the Mountain was the earliest mainland China film to depict the war, although its narrative was that the Chinese were on the defensive after Vietnamese attacked the Chinese border first with the objective of Nanning. The male protagonist of the television series Candle in the Tomb was a veteran of conflict. The 2017 Chinese movie Youth covers the period of the Sino-Vietnamese conflict from the perspective of the larger cultural changes taking place in China during that period of time. Inspired by the conflict, Chinese rock musician Cui Jian wrote the anti-war song "Last Shot" in 1987.

=== Vietnamese media ===
The war was mentioned in the film Đất mẹ (Motherland) directed by Hải Ninh in 1980 and Thị xã trong tầm tay (Town at the Fingertips) directed by Đặng Nhật Minh in 1982. Also in 1982, a documentary film directed by Truong Thanh called Hoa đưa hương nơi đất anh nằm (Flowers over Your Grave) was released. The film told a story of a Japanese journalist who died during the war. During the war, there were numerous patriotic songs produced to boost the nationalism of Vietnamese people, including "Chiến đấu vì độc lập tự do" ("Fight for Independence and Freedom") composed by Phạm Tuyên, "Lời tạm biệt lúc lên đường" ("Farewell When Leaving") by Vu Trong Hoi, "40 thế kỷ cùng ra trận" ("40 Centuries We Fought Side By Side") by Hong Dang, "Những đôi mắt mang hình viên đạn" ("The Eyes Shaped Like Bullets") by Tran Tien and "Hát về anh" (Sing for you) by The Hien. The Sino-Vietnamese War also appeared in some novels such as: Đêm tháng Hai (Night of February) written by Chu Lai in 1979 and Chân dung người hàng xóm (Portrait of My Neighbors) written by Duong Thu Huong in 1979.

== Order of battle ==
=== Chinese forces ===
Although the People's Liberation Army vastly outnumbered the Vietnamese forces, the Soviet-Vietnamese alliance compelled the Chinese to deploy the majority of their forces along China's northern frontier with the Soviet Union (as well as, to a lesser extent, Soviet-allied Mongolia) as a deterrent to Soviet intervention.

The Chinese force that engaged the Vietnamese consisted of units from the Kunming Military Region, Chengdu Military Region, Wuhan Military Region and Guangzhou Military Region, but commanded by the headquarters of Kunming Military Region on the western front and Guangzhou Military Region in the eastern front.

- Guangxi Direction (East Front) commanded by the Front Headquarter of Guangzhou Military Region in Nanning. Commander-Xu Shiyou, Political Commissar-Xiang Zhonghua, Chief of Staff-Zhou Deli
  - North Group: Commander-Ou Zhifu (Deputy Commander of Guangzhou Military Region)
    - 41st Army Commander-Zhang Xudeng, Political Commissar-Liu Zhanrong
      - 121st Infantry Division Commander-Zheng Wenshui
      - 122nd Infantry Division Commander-Li Xinliang
      - 123rd Infantry Division Commander-Li Peijiang
  - South Group: Commander-Wu Zhong (Deputy Commander of Guangzhou Military Region)
    - 42nd Army Commander-Wei Huajie, Political Commissar-Xun Li
      - 124th Infantry Division Commander-Gu Hui
      - 125th Infantry Division
      - 126th Infantry Division
  - East Group: Commander-Jiang Xieyuan (Deputy Commander of Guangzhou Military Region)
    - 55th Army Commander-Zhu Yuehua, Temporary Political Commissar-Guo Changzeng
      - 163rd Infantry Division Commander-Bian Guixiang, Political Commissar-Wu Enqing, Chief of Staff-Xing Shizhong
      - 164th Infantry Division Commander-Xiao Xuchu (also Deputy Commander of 55th Corps)
      - 165th Infantry Division
    - 1st Artillery Division
  - Reserve Group (came from Wuhan Military Region except 50th Corps from Chengdu Military Region), Deputy Commander-Han Huaizhi (Commander of 54th Corps)
    - 43rd Army Commander-Zhu Chuanyu, Temporary Political Commissar-Zhao Shengchang
      - 127th Infantry Division Commander-Zhang Wannian (also as the Deputy Commander of 43rd Corps)
      - 128th Infantry Division
      - 129th Infantry Division
    - 54th Army Commander-Han Huaizhi (pluralism), Political Commissar-Zhu Zhiwei
      - 160th Infantry Division (commanded by 41st Corp in this war) Commander-Zhang Zhixin, Political Commissar-Li Zhaogui
      - 161st Infantry Division
      - 162nd Infantry Division Commander-Li Jiulong
    - 50th Army Temporary Commander-Liu Guangtong, Political Commissar-Gao Xingyao
      - 148th Infantry Division
      - 150th Infantry Division
    - 20th Army (only dispatched the 58th Division into the war)
      - 58th Infantry Division (commanded by the 50th Corps during the war)
  - Guangxi Military Region (as a provincial military region) Commander-Zhao Xinran Chief of Staff-Yin Xi
    - 1st Regiment of Frontier Defense in Youyiguan Pass
    - 2nd Regiment of Frontier Defense in Baise District
    - 3rd Regiment of Frontier Defense in Fangcheng County
    - The Independent Infantry Division of Guangxi Military Region
  - Air Force of Guangzhou Military Region (armed patrol in the sky of Guangxi, did not see combat)
    - 7th Air Force Corps
      - 13th Air Force Division (aerotransport unit came from Hubei province)
  - 70th Antiaircraft Artillery Division
  - The 217 Fleet of South Sea Fleet
  - 8th Navy Aviation Division
  - The Independent Tank Regiment of Guangzhou Military Region
  - 83rd Bateau Boat Regiment
  - 84th Bateau Boat Regiment
- Yunnan Direction (the West Front) commanded by the Front Headquarter of Kunming Military Region in Kaiyuan. Commander-Yang Dezhi, Political Commissar-Liu Zhijian, Chief of Staff-Sun Ganqing
  - 11th Army (consisted of two divisions) Commander-Chen Jiagui, Political Commissar-Zhang Qi
    - 31st Infantry Division
    - 32nd Infantry Division
  - 13th Army(camed from Chengdu Military Region) Commander-Yan Shouqing, Political Commissar-Qiao Xueting
    - 37th Infantry Division
    - 38th Infantry Division
    - 39th Infantry Division
  - 14th Army Commander-Zhang Jinghua, Political Commissar-Fan Xinyou
    - 40th Infantry Division
    - 41st Infantry Division
    - 42nd Infantry Division
  - 149th Infantry Division (from Chengdu Military Region, belonged to 50th Corps, assigned to Yunnan Direction during the war)
  - Yunnan Military Region (as a provincial military region)
    - 11th Regiment of Frontier Defence in Maguan County
    - 12th Regiment of Frontier Defence in Malipo County
    - 13th Regiment of Frontier Defence in
    - 14th Regiment of Frontier Defence in
    - 1st Garrison Division of Chengdu Military Region commanded by 11th Army in the war
  - 65th Antiaircraft Artillery Division
  - 4th Artillery Division
  - Independent Tank Regiment of Kunming Military Region
  - 86th Bateau Boat Regiment
  - 23rd Logistic Branch (consisted of five army service stations, six hospitals, eleven medical establishments)
  - 17th Automobile Regiment commanded by 13th Corps during the war
  - 22nd Automobile Regiment
  - 5th Air Force Corps
    - 44th Air Force Division (fighter unit)
    - Independent unit of 27th Air Force Division
    - 15th Air Force Antiaircraft Artillery Division

=== Vietnamese forces ===
The Vietnamese government claimed they only had a force of about 60,000 including several army regular divisions in its northern area.

1st Military Region: commanded by Major General Đàm Quang Trung, responsible for the defense at Northeast region.

- Main forces:
  - 3rd Infantry Division (Golden Star Division), consisted of 2nd Infantry Regiment, 12th Infantry Regiment, 141st Infantry Regiment and 68th Artillery Regiment. All were located at Dong Dang, Van Dang, Cao Loc and Lạng Sơn town of Lạng Sơn Province
  - 338th Infantry Division, consisted of 460th Infantry Regiment, 461st Infantry Regiment, 462nd Infantry Regiment and 208th Artillery Regiment. All were located at Loc Binh and Dinh Lap of Lạng Sơn Province
  - 346th Infantry Division (Lam Son Division), consisted of 246th Infantry Regiment, 677th Infantry Regiment, 851st Infantry Regiment and 188th Artillery Regiment. All were located at Tra Linh, Ha Quang and Hoa An of Cao Bằng Province
  - 325th-B Infantry Division, consisted of 8th Infantry Regiment, 41st Infantry Regiment, 288th Infantry Regiment and 189th Artillery Regiment. All were located at Tien Yen and Binh Lieu of Quảng Ninh Province
  - 242nd Infantry Brigade, located at coastlines and islands of Quảng Ninh Province
- Local forces:
  - At Cao Bằng Province: 567th Infantry Regiment, 1 artillery battalion, 1 battalion of air defense artillery and 7 infantry battalions
  - At Lạng Sơn Province: 123rd Infantry Regiment, 199th Infantry Regiment and 7 infantry battalions
  - At Quảng Ninh Province: 43rd Infantry Regiment, 244th Infantry Regiment, 1 artillery battalion, 4 battalions of air defense artillery and 5 infantry battalions
- Armed police forces (Border guard): 12th Mobile Regiment at Lang Son, 4 battalions at Cao Bang and Quang Ninh, some companies and 24 border posts

2nd Military Region: commanded by Major General Vũ Lập, responsible for the defense at Northwest region.

- Main forces:
  - 316th Infantry Division (Bong Lau Division), consisted of 98th Infantry Regiment, 148th Infantry Regiment, 147th Infantry Regiment and 187th Artillery Regiment. All were located at Binh Lu and Phong Tho of Lai Châu Province
  - 345th Infantry Division, consisted of 118th Infantry Regiment, 121st Infantry Regiment, 124th Infantry Regiment and 190th Artillery Regiment. All were located at Bao Thang of Hoang Lien Son province
  - 326th Infantry Division, consisted of 19th Infantry Regiment, 46th Infantry Regiment, 541st Infantry Regiment and 200th Artillery Regiment. All were located at Tuan Giao and Dien Bien of Lai Châu Province
- Local forces:
  - At Ha Tuyen: 122nd Infantry Regiment, 191st Infantry Regiment, 1 artillery battalion and 8 infantry battalions
  - At Hoang Lien Son: 191st Infantry Regiment, 254th Infantry Regiment, 1 artillery battalion and 8 infantry battalions
  - At Lai Châu: 193rd Infantry Regiment, 741st Infantry Regiment, 1 artillery battalion and 5 infantry battalions
- Armed police forces (Border guard): 16th Mobile Regiment at Hoang Lien Son, some companies and 39 border posts

In addition, Vietnamese forces were supported by about 50,000 militia at each Military Region

Air force

- 372nd Air Division
  - 1 air flight of ten F-5s (captured after Vietnam War)
  - 1 air flight of ten A-37s (captured after Vietnam War)
  - 1 air flight of seven UH-1s and three UH-7s (captured after Vietnam War)
- 919th Air Transport Regiment responsible for transporting troops
  - Several C-130, C-119 and C-47 (captured after Vietnam War)
- 371st Air Division
  - 916th Helicopter Regiment
    - Several Mi-6 and Mi-8
  - 918th Air Transport Regiment
  - 923rd Fighter Regiment
    - Several MiG-17s and MiG-21

The Vietnam People's Air Force did not participate in the combat directly, instead they provided support to the ground troops, transported troops from Cambodia to northern Vietnam as well as performed reconnaissance missions.

Air Defence

- Northern and Northwestern regions:
  - 267th Air Defence Regiment
  - 276th Air Defence Regiment
  - 285th Air Defence Regiment
  - 255th Air Defence Regiment
  - 257th Air Defence Regiment
- Northeastern region:
  - 274th Air Defence Regiment

== See also ==
- List of wars involving the People's Republic of China
- List of wars involving Vietnam
- China–Vietnam relations
- Cambodian–Vietnamese War
- Sino-Soviet border conflict
- Sino-Soviet split
- Sino-Vietnamese conflicts (1979–1991)
