= 14th Army (People's Republic of China) =

Chinese military unit

14th Corps (1949-60) 14th Army Corps (1960-85) 14th Army (1985-2017)
- Chinese: 第14集团军
- Active: February 1949–April 2017 (inactive)
- Country: China
- Allegiance: Chinese Communist Party
- Branch: People's Liberation Army Ground Force
- Part of: Southern Theater Command
- Garrison/HQ: Kunming, Yunnan
- Engagements: Chinese Civil War; 1959 Tibetan uprising Vietnam War; Sino-Vietnamese War

The 14th Army was a former army division of the People's Liberation Army stationed in Yunnan, China. It was deactivated in 2017.

== 14th Corps ==
14th Corps (Chinese: 第14军) was activated on February 14, 1949 basing on 4th Column of Zhongyuan Field Army and defecting Republic of China Army 110th Division. The corps commander was Li Chengfang, political commissar - Lei Rongtian.

The Corps was composed of the 40th, the 41st, and the 42nd Divisions.

During the Chinese Civil War, the corps took part in Guangdong Campaign and Xichang Campaign. From March 1950 the corps stationed in Yunnan province until its inactivation.

In 1959, elements from the corps took part in the crackdown on 1959 Tibetan uprising.

== 14th Army Corps ==
In April 1960, the corps was renamed as 14th Army Corps (Chinese: 陆军第14军).

In late 1969, 116th Artillery Regiment and 39th Anti-Aircraft Artillery Regiment were renamed as Artillery Regiment, 14th Army Corps, and Anti-Aircraft Artillery Regiment, 14th Army Corps, respectively.

=== Shadian Incident ===
In July 1975, 14th Army Corps, especially its 42nd Army Division, took part in the crackdown on Shadian incident as the main assault force, during which the PLA killed over 1000 Hui Muslim fighters with a loss of over 120 KIA

=== Sino-Vietnamese War ===
From February to March 1979, the 14th Army Corps took part in the Sino-Vietnamese War. During the 25-day-long campaign, the army corps thrust 48-80 km into the Vietnamese territory, seized the city of Lào Cai and secured the bridgehead across the Red River.

In 1982, Tank Regiment, 14th Army Corps was activated.

In April 1984 the army corps launched the Battle of Laoshan and the Battle of Zheyinshan.

== 14th Army ==
In September 1985 the army corps was reorganized as 14th Army (Chinese: 第14集团军).

In September 1992 42nd Infantry Division was disbanded.

In October 1996, 41st Infantry Division was transferred to People's Armed Police's control as 41st Armed Police Mobile Division.

In 1998, Tank Brigade, 14th Army was renamed as Armored Brigade, 14th Army.

In late 2011, Armored Brigade, 14th Army was redesignated as 18th Armored Brigade.

In late 2013, both the 31st Infantry Division and 40th Infantry Division were split into two brigades. The army became an "all-brigade" formation.

== Deactivation ==
In 2017, following the restructuring of the People's Liberation Army from seven regions into five regions, the 14th army was deactivated and was absorbed by the Southern Theater Command Ground Force.
