= Korean War order of battle: Chinese =

Korean War order of battle 1950–1953

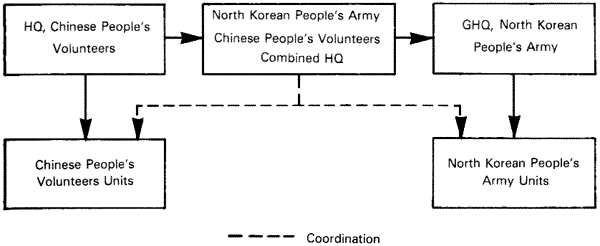
Relationship between the Chinese People's Volunteer Army and the Korean People's Army

This is the order of battle for Chinese People's Volunteer Army during major periods of hostilities in the Korean War. After the People's Republic of China entered the Korean War in October 1950 by designating the People's Liberation Army (PLA) North East Frontier Force as the People's Volunteer Army (PVA), the PVA spent the next two years and nine months in combat operations and five years and three months in garrison duties. Its last elements did not leave Korea until as late as 1958.

During this period, China paid a huge price for its involvement in the Korean War. According to Chinese archives, about 73 percent of Chinese infantry forces, 67 percent of Chinese artillery forces, 100 percent of Chinese armored forces and 52 percent of Chinese air forces were deployed in Korea at one point or another, alongside 600,000 civilian laborers – in total more than three million civilian and military personnel. Out of those forces, around 152,000 were killed, 383,500 were wounded, 450,000 were hospitalized, 21,300 were captured and 4,000 were missing. Of the captured 14,190 defected to Taiwan after the ceasefire. China had also consumed 5.6 million tons of war materiel, 399 aircraft and 12,916 vehicles for its war efforts. About a third of the Chinese government's annual budget was spent on the military between 1950 and 1953, totaling 10 billion RMB by the war's end. (Note: Equivalent to 3.3 billion USD. See Li 2007, p. 112.) All in all, the Korean War was the largest foreign war in Chinese military history, despite the fact that no declaration of war ever existed between China and United Nations forces.

For many years, historians found it difficult to provide an accurate order of battle for Chinese troops in Korea because most of the information could only be obtained from prisoner interrogations or captured documents. The constant Chinese troop movements and the reattachment of units between different commands further added to the confusion. By the 1980s, however, a large number of primary documents, memoirs and scholarly works on Chinese involvement in the Korean War began to appear in China, enabling historians to make a more comprehensive and accurate assessment of Chinese military operations during the war.

As the term "Corps" does not exist in Chinese military terminology, the term "Army" (军) technically means "Corps" in PLA nomenclature, while the term "Army Group" (集团军 or 兵团) means "Army". For example, the US X Corps is always referred to as the "US 10th Army" (美第10军) among Chinese sources. As such, this article uses the term "Corps" and "Army" to denote Chinese Army and Army Group formations.

== First Phase Campaign (October 25 – November 5, 1950) ==
Although the Chinese leadership did not make the decision to enter the Korean War until United Nations (UN) forces crossed the 38th Parallel in October 1950, it had been preparing for the possibility ever since United States intervened in Korea in June 1950. On July 13, 1950, and soon after UN forces entered the Korean War, Chairman of the Chinese Communist Party, Mao Zedong, ordered the People's Liberation Army (PLA) 13th Army—China's strategic reserve stationed in southern China—to form the PLA North East Frontier Force (NEFF) in Manchuria. Aside from the 38th, 39th and 40th Infantry Corps originally belonged to the 13th Army, the NEFF also included the 42nd Infantry Corps, three artillery divisions, one anti-aircraft regiments and three transport regiments—in total more than 250,000 men. On October 19, 1950, and under strict secrecy, the NEFF officially crossed the Yalu River under the name Chinese People's Volunteer Army (PVA), although advance scouting parties had been spotted by UN forces as early as October 13. On October 23, the PLA 50th and 66th Corps were attached to the PVA 13th Army in order to reinforce the defenses at Sinuiju and Chongju area. At the same time, the 13th Army Headquarters was disbanded to increase coordination between PVA Headquarters and its field units.

=== Chinese People's Volunteer Army Headquarters ===
| Commander | Peng Dehuai |
| Commissar | Peng Dehuai |
| Chief of Staff | Xie Fang |
| Political Director | Du Ping |

=== Frontline ===
PVA Headquarters Subordinate Corps
| Unit | Commander | Sub-units | Notes |
|---|---|---|---|
| 38th Corps | Commander Liang Xingchu; Commissar Liu Xiyuan | 112th Division; 113th Division; 114th Division | Entered Korea on October 19, 1950. |
| 39th Corps | Commander Wu Xinquan; Commissar Xu Binzhou | 115th Division; 116th Division; 117th Division | Entered Korea on October 19, 1950. Responsible for the destruction of the ROK 15th Infantry Regiment and 3rd Battalion of the US 8th Cavalry Regiment at the Battle of Unsan. |
| 40th Corps | Commander Wen Yucheng; Commissar Yuan Shengping | 118th Division; 119th Division; 120th Division | Entered Korea on October 19, 1950, and the first Chinese unit to make contact with UN forces in Korea. Responsible for the destruction of ROK 6th Infantry Division at the Battle of Onjong. |
| 42nd Corps | Commander Wu Ruilin; Commissar Zhou Biao | 124th Division; 125th Division; 126th Division | Entered Korea on October 19, 1950. Its 124th Division was reportedly decimated during the November 2–5 engagement with US 1st Marine Division at the south of Chosin Reservoir. UN intelligence indicated the division did not recover as late as January 1951. |
| 50th Corps | Commander Zeng Zesheng; Commissar Xu Wenlie | 148th Division; 149th Division; 150th Division | Entered Korea on October 26, 1950. |
| 66th Corps | Commander Xiao Xinhuai; Commissar Wang Zifeng | 196th Division; 197th Division; 198th Division | Entered Korea on October 27, 1950. |

=== Supports ===
| Unit | Commander | Sub-units | Notes |
|---|---|---|---|
| Artillery Command | Commander Kuang Yumin; Commissar Qiu Chuangcheng | 1st Artillery Division; 2nd Artillery Division; 8th Artillery Division; 1st Anti-Aircraft Artillery Regiment | |
| Engineer Command Bureau | Director Chen Zhengfeng | 4th Engineer Regiment; 6th Engineer Regiment | |
| Frontline Logistics Command Bureau | Director Zhang Mingyuan; Commissar She Zheheng | 1st Detachment; 2nd Detachment | Formerly PLA Northeast Military Region Logistics Department Forward Command Bureau. Formed in November 1950. |

== Second Phase Campaign (November 25 – December 24, 1950) ==
On August 26, 1950, the Chinese Central Military Commission concluded that PVA will eventually be composed of the PLA 9th, 13th and 19th Army—totaling 700,000 men—by the spring of 1951. On October 11, 1950, Mao authorized the PLA 9th Army to be moved from Shandong province to Manchuria as reserves to the 13th Army in Korea. On November 10, 1950, the PLA 9th Army entered Korea in order to reinforce Chinese forces on the east side of Taebaek Mountains. This development brought the total PVA strength to 450,000, including 380,000 combat personnel.

=== Chinese People's Volunteer Army Headquarters ===
| Commander | Peng Dehuai |
| Commissar | Peng Dehuai |
| Chief of Staff | Xie Fang |
| Political Director | Du Ping |

=== Frontline ===
PVA Headquarters Subordinate Corps
| Unit | Commander | Sub-units | Notes |
|---|---|---|---|
| 38th Corps | Commander Liang Xingchu; Commissar Liu Xiyuan | 112th Division; 113th Division; 114th Division | Responsible for the destruction of ROK II Corps, Turkish Brigade and US 2nd Infantry Division at the Battle of the Ch'ongch'on River. Received the title "Ten Thousand Years Corps" for its achievement. |
| 39th Corps | Commander Wu Xinquan; Commissar Xu Binzhou | 115th Division; 116th Division; 117th Division | |
| 40th Corps | Commander Wen Yucheng; Commissar Yuan Shengping | 118th Division; 119th Division; 120th Division | |
| 42nd Corps | Commander Wu Ruilin; Commissar Zhou Biao | 124th Division; 125th Division; 126th Division | Responsible for the destruction of ROK II Corps. Failed in its attempt to encircle the entire US Eighth Army at the Battle of the Ch'ongch'on River. |
| 50th Corps | Commander Zeng Zesheng; Commissar Xu Wenlie | 148th Division; 149th Division; 150th Division | UN intelligence also indicated that the 167th Division of the PLA 56th Corps was attached to the 50th Corps during the campaign, but this is not corroborated by Chinese records. |
| 66th Corps | Commander Xiao Xinhuai; Commissar Wang Zifeng | 196th Division; 197th Division; 198th Division | |

9th Army Commander: Song Shi-Lun Commissar: Song Shi-Lun
| Unit | Commander | Sub-units | Notes |
|---|---|---|---|
| 20th Corps | Commander and Commissar Zhang Yixiang | 58th Division; 59th Division; 60th Division; 89th Division | Entered Korea on November 10, 1950. Destroyed during the Battle of Chosin Reservoir and pulled off the frontline for rest and refit. |
| 26th Corps | Commander Zhang Renchu; Commissar Li Yaowen | 76th Division; 77th Division; 78th Division; 88th Division | Entered Korea on November 12, 1950. Its 78th and 88th Division did not arrive in time to participate in the Battle of Chosin Reservoir. Pulled off the frontline for rest and refit in the aftermath of Chosin Reservoir battle. |
| 27th Corps | Commander Peng Deqing; Commissar Liu Haotian | 79th Division; 80th Division; 81st Division; 94th Division | Entered Korea on November 10, 1950, and responsible for the destruction of Task Force Faith. Destroyed during the Battle of Chosin Reservoir and pulled off the frontline for rest and refit. Its 94th Division was often misidentified as the 90th Division by UN intelligence. |

=== Supports ===
| Unit | Commander | Sub-units | Notes |
|---|---|---|---|
| Artillery Command | Commander Wan Yi; Commissar Qiu Chuangcheng | 1st Artillery Division; 2nd Artillery Division; 8th Artillery Division | Chinese records and UN intelligence did not indicate any artillery formations were deployed during the campaign. |
| Engineer Command Bureau | Director Chen Zhengfeng | 4th Engineer Regiment; 5th Engineer Regiment; 6th Engineer Regiment; 8th Engineer Regiment | |
| Frontline Logistics Command Bureau | Director Zhang Mingyuan; Commissar She Zheheng | 1st Detachment; 2nd Detachment; 3rd Detachment; 4th Detachment | |
| Railway Engineers | Commander Li Shouxuan | 1st Railway Engineer Division; Bridging Regiment; Independent Regiment | Entered Korea in November 1950. In total composed of three bridging regiments, one track regiment and one independent regiment. |

== Third Phase Campaign (December 31, 1950 – January 8, 1951) ==
Although the PVA succeeded in expelling UN forces from North Korea during the Second Phase Campaign, about a quarter of its original 450,000 men became casualties in the aftermath of the campaign. On December 17, Mao ordered the PVA 9th Army to be removed from the front for rest and refit, reducing the PVA combat personnel to 230,000 by the end of December 1950. UN intelligence, on the other hand, estimated that only 171,117 combat personal were actually available for the PVA on January 1, 1951. By the end of 1950, however, the North Korean People's Army returned to the front and brought about 75,000 men to make up for the Chinese losses.

=== Chinese People's Volunteer Army Headquarters ===
| Commander | Peng Dehuai |
| Commissar | Peng Dehuai |
| Chief of Staff | Xie Fang |
| Political Director | Du Ping |

=== Frontline ===
PVA Headquarters Subordinate Corps
| Unit | Commander | Sub-units | Notes |
|---|---|---|---|
| 38th Corps | Commander Liang Xingchu; Commissar Liu Xiyuan | 112th Division; 113th Division; 114th Division | |
| 39th Corps | Commander Wu Xinquan; Commissar Xu Binzhou | 115th Division; 116th Division; 117th Division | First Chinese unit to enter Seoul on January 4, 1951. |
| 40th Corps | Commander Wen Yucheng; Commissar Yuan Shengping | 118th Division; 119th Division; 120th Division | |
| 42nd Corps | Commander Wu Ruilin; Commissar Zhou Biao | 124th Division; 125th Division; 126th Division | |
| 50th Corps | Commander Zeng Zesheng; Commissar Xu Wenlie | 148th Division; 149th Division; 150th Division | Responsible for the destruction of British 1st Battalion, Royal Ulster Rifles during the Third Battle of Seoul. UN intelligence also indicated that the 167th Division of the PLA 56th Corps was attached to the 50th Corps during the campaign, but this is not corroborated by Chinese records. |
| 66th Corps | Commander Xiao Xinhuai; Commissar Wang Zifeng | 196th Division; 197th Division; 198th Division | |

=== Supports ===
| Unit | Commander | Sub-units | Notes |
|---|---|---|---|
| Artillery Command | Commander Wan Yi; Commissar Qiu Chuangcheng | 1st Artillery Division; 2nd Artillery Division; 8th Artillery Division | Elements of 1st, 2nd and 8th Artillery Division were under direct control of PVA Headquarters Subordinate Corps for the duration of campaign. |
| Engineer Command Bureau | Director Chen Zhengfeng | 4th Engineer Regiment; 5th Engineer Regiment; 6th Engineer Regiment; 8th Engineer Regiment | |
| Frontline Logistics Command Bureau | Director Zhang Mingyuan; Commissar She Zheheng | 1st Detachment; 2nd Detachment; 3rd Detachment; 4th Detachment | |
| Railway Engineers | Commander Li Shouxuan | 1st Railway Engineer Division; Bridging Regiment; Independent Regiment | Composed of three bridging regiments, one track regiment and one independent regiment. |

== Fourth Phase Campaign (January 30 – April 21, 1951) ==
By the end of the Third Phase Campaign, the PVA had become completely exhausted after fighting nonstop since the start of the Chinese intervention, and its combat personnel was further reduced to 217,000. According to PVA Deputy Commander Han Xianchu's evaluation of PVA, "many regiments and battalions are completely combat ineffective, with some divisions only half strength". On February 7, 1951, Mao decided that PLA 3rd, 19th, 20th Army and 47th Corps—from Sichuan, Gansu, Hebei and Hunan provinces respectively—would enter Korea to replace the PVA 13th Army currently on the front. But despite the massive mobilization effort, only the 26th Corps from the recovering PVA 9th Army actually arrived at the front during March 1951.

=== Chinese People's Volunteer Army Headquarters ===
| Commander | Peng Dehuai |
| Commissar | Peng Dehuai |
| Chief of Staff | Xie Fang |
| Political Director | Du Ping |

=== Frontline ===
PVA Headquarters Subordinate Corps
| Unit | Commander | Sub-units | Notes |
|---|---|---|---|
| 38th Corps | Commander Liang Xingchu; Commissar Liu Xiyuan | 112th Division; 113th Division; 114th Division | Decimated during Operation Thunderbolt in February 1951. Pulled off the frontline for rest and refit in March 1951. |
| 39th Corps | Commander Wu Xinquan; Commissar Xu Binzhou | 115th Division; 116th Division; 117th Division | Responsible for the destruction of ROK 8th Infantry Division at the Battle of Hoengsong. Failed in its attempts to break through the UN front at the Battle of Chipyong-ni. |
| 40th Corps | Commander Wen Yucheng; Commissar Yuan Shengping | 118th Division; 119th Division; 120th Division | Responsible for the destruction of ROK 8th Infantry Division at the Battle of Hoengsong. Failed in its attempts to break through the UN front at the Chipyong-ni and Wonju battles. |
| 42nd Corps | Commander Wu Ruilin; Commissar Zhou Biao | 124th Division; 125th Division; 126th Division | Participated in the Battle of the Twin Tunnels and responsible for the destruction of ROK 8th Infantry Division at the Battle of Hoengsong. Failed in its attempts to break through the UN front at the Chipyong-ni and Wonju battles. Pulled off the frontline for rest and refit in March 1951. |
| 50th Corps | Commander Zeng Zesheng; Commissar Xu Wenlie | 148th Division; 149th Division; 150th Division | Mostly composed of Chinese Nationalist soldiers surrendered to the Communist side during the Chinese Civil War. Its complete destruction during Operation Thunderbolt in February 1951 sparked controversies over the treatment of Nationalist POWs impressed into Communist service. Returned to Manchuria in March 1951 for rest and refit. |
| 66th Corps | Commander Xiao Xinhuai; Commissar Wang Zifeng | 196th Division; 197th Division; 198th Division | Responsible for the destruction of ROK 8th Infantry Division at the Battle of Hoengsong. Failed in its attempts to break through the UN front at the Chipyong-ni and Wonju battles. Returned to Northern China in March 1951. |

9th Army Commander: Song Shi-Lun Commissar: Song Shi-Lun
| Unit | Commander | Sub-units | Notes |
|---|---|---|---|
| 26th Corps | Commander Zhang Renchu; Commissar Li Yaowen | 76th Division; 77th Division; 78th Division; 88th Division | The first element of the 9th Army to recover from the Chosin Reservoir battle. Returned to the battlefield in March 1951. |

=== Supports ===
| Unit | Commander | Sub-units | Notes |
|---|---|---|---|
| Artillery Command Department | Director Kuang Yumin | 1st Artillery Division; 2nd Artillery Division; 8th Artillery Division | Chinese records indicated only 1st Artillery Division had participated in combat actions against UN forces during the campaign. |
| Engineer Command Bureau | Director Chen Zhengfeng | 3rd Engineer Regiment; 4th Engineer Regiment; 5th Engineer Regiment; 6th Engineer Regiment; 8th Engineer Regiment; 10th Engineer Regiment; 18th Engineer Regiment; 22nd Engineer Regiment | |
| Frontline Logistics Command Bureau | Commander Zhang Mingyuan; Commissar She Zheheng | 1st Detachment; 2nd Detachment; 3rd Detachment; 4th Detachment; 5th Detachment; 6th Detachment; 7th Detachment | Composed of nine truck regiments, three transport regiments plus seven battalions, three security regiments plus one battalion, two Public Security regiments plus one battalion, one Secret Service regiment and one Battlefield Logistics battalion. |
| Railway Command Bureau | Director Li Shouxuan | 1st Railway Engineer Division; 2nd Railway Engineer Division; 3rd Railway Engineer Division | In total composed of six bridging regiments and three track regiments. 2nd Railway Engineer Division enter Korea in April 1951, while the 3rd Railway Engineer Division entered Korea in February 1951. |

== Fifth Phase Campaign (April 22 – June 10, 1951) ==
In the aftermath of the Fourth Phase Campaign, the PVA 13th Army's 38th and 42nd Corps were forced to leave the frontline for rest and refit, while its 50th and 66th Corps were evacuated back to China. Following Mao's orders, however, the PLA 3rd and 19th Army began to enter Korea in February 1951, alongside four field artillery divisions, two long range artillery divisions, four anti-aircraft divisions, one multiple rocket launcher division and four tank regiments. The PVA 9th Army had also returned to the front in April 1951 after four months of rest. Those development soon brought the total PVA strength to over one million men, including 548,000 combat personnel and 180,000 logistics personnel. On April 21, 1951, the 39th and 40th Corps of the PVA 13th Army were placed under 9th Army's control. On April 22, 1951, the reorganized PVA launched a full-scale offensive in Korea, and the resulting clashes between Chinese and UN forces is often described as the largest battle of the entire Korean War.

=== Chinese People's Volunteer Army Headquarters ===
| Commander | Peng Dehuai |
| Commissar | Peng Dehuai |
| Chief of Staff | Xie Fang |
| Political Director | Du Ping |

=== Frontline ===
3rd Army Commander: Chen Geng Acting Commander: Wang Jinshan Commissar: Chen Geng
| Unit | Commander | Sub-units | Notes |
|---|---|---|---|
| 12th Corps | Commander Zeng Shaoshan; Commissar Li Zhen | 31st Division; 34th Division; 35th Division | Entered Korea on March 25, 1951. Routed during the Battle of the Soyang River. |
| 15th Corps | Commander Qin Jiwei; Commissar Gu Jingsheng | 29th Division; 44th Division; 45th Division | Entered Korea in February 1951. |
| 60th Corps | Commander Shu Jie; Commissar Yuan Ziqin | 179th Division; 180th Division; 181st Division | Entered Korea on March 20, 1951. Routed during the Battle of the Soyang River with its 180th Division suffering 7,000 casualties, majority of them captured by UN force. This incident is often cited as the worse Chinese defeat during the entire Korean War. |
| 2nd Artillery Division | Commander Zhu Guang; Commissar Zhang Bailing | 28th Artillery Regiment; 29th Artillery Regiment; 30th Artillery Regiment | |

9th Army Commander: Song Shi-Lun Commissar: Song Shi-Lun
| Unit | Commander | Sub-units | Notes |
|---|---|---|---|
| 20th Corps | Commander and Commissar Zhang Yixiang | 58th Division; 59th Division; 60th Division | Its 89th Division was disband in February 1951. Recovered from Chosin Reservoir battle around April 1951. |
| 26th Corps | Commander Zhang Renchu; Commissar Li Yaowen | 76th Division; 77th Division; 78th Division; 88th Division | |
| 27th Corps | Commander Peng Deqing; Commissar Zeng Ruqing | 79th Division; 80th Division; 81st Division | Its 94th Division was disband in February 1951. Recovered from Chosin Reservoir battle around April 1951. |
| 39th Corps | Commander Wu Xinquan; Commissar Li Xuesan | 115th Division; 116th Division; 117th Division | Misidentify by UN intelligence as a part of the 13th Army. |
| 40th Corps | Commander Wen Yucheng; Commissar Yuan Shengping | 118th Division; 119th Division; 120th Division | Misidentify by UN intelligence as a part of the 13th Army. |
| 1st Artillery Division | Commander Wen Ji; Commissar Zhang Ying | 25th Artillery Regiment; 26th Artillery Regiment; 27th Artillery Regiment | |
| 7th Artillery Division | Commander Yan Fu; Commissar Zhu Li | 20th Artillery Regiment | |

19th Army Commander: Yang Dezhi Commissar: Li Zhimin
| Unit | Commander | Sub-units | Notes |
|---|---|---|---|
| 63rd Corps | Commander Fu Chongbi; Commissar Long Daoquan | 187th Division; 188th Division; 189th Division | Entered Korea on February 18, 1951. Responsible for the destruction of British 1st Battalion, Gloucestershire Regiment at the Battle of the Imjin River. |
| 64th Corps | Commander Zeng Siyu; Commissar Wang Zhao | 190th Division; 191st Division; 192nd Division | Enter Korea in February 1951. Decimated during the Battle of the Imjin River. Failed to achieve its mission of capturing Seoul and encircle the US I and IX Corps. |
| 65th Corps | Commander Xiao Yingtang; Commissar Wang Daobang | 193rd Division; 194th Division; 195th Division | Entered Korea on February 23, 1951. Decimated during the Battle of the Imjin River. |
| 8th Artillery Division | Commander Wang Heng; Commissar Li Zhenbang | 31st Artillery Regiment; 43rd Artillery Regiment | Its 31st Artillery Regiment was under the operational control of 65th Corps. |

=== Supports ===
| Unit | Commander | Sub-units | Notes |
|---|---|---|---|
| Armor Command Bureau | Director Huang Huxian | 1st Tank Regiment; 2nd Tank Regiment; 3rd Tank Regiment; 6th Independent Tank Regiment | Formed in March 1951 from elements of the PLA 1st Tank Division. Entered Korea near the end of Fourth Phase Campaign. |
| Artillery Command Bureau | Director Kuang Yumin | 21st Rocket Artillery Division; 31st Anti-Tank Artillery Division; 32nd Rocket Artillery Division; 61st Anti-Aircraft Artillery Division; 62nd Anti-Aircraft Artillery Division; 63rd Anti-Aircraft Artillery Division; 64th Anti-Aircraft Artillery Division | All divisions entered Korea near the end of Fourth Phase Campaign. |
| Engineer Command Bureau | Director Chen Zhengfeng | 3rd Engineer Regiment; 7th Engineer Regiment; 10th Engineer Regiment; 14th Engineer Regiment; 15th Engineer Regiment; 16th Engineer Regiment; 17th Engineer Regiment; 18th Engineer Regiment; 22nd Engineer Regiment | |
| Logistics Command | Commander Hong Xuezhi; Commissar Zhou Chunquan | 1st Detachment; 2nd Detachment; 3rd Detachment; 4th Detachment; 5th Detachment; 7th Detachment | Reorganized from Frontline Logistics Command Bureau on May 19, 1951. Composed of 22 service stations, 10 truck regiments, six transport regiments and six security regiments. |
| Railway Command Bureau | Director Li Shouxuan; Commissar Cui Tianmin | 1st Railway Engineer Division; 2nd Railway Engineer Division; 3rd Railway Engineer Division | Composed of six bridging regiments and three track regiments. |

== UN limited offensives (June 11 – December 3, 1951) ==
The Fifth Phase Campaign ended as a complete operational disaster for the PVA. About 12 divisions from the PVA 3rd and 19th Army were rendered combat ineffective, and between 85,000 and 110,000 men became casualties in the aftermath. With the frontline on the verge of collapse in the face of UN attacks, the 42nd and 47th Corps were sent as reinforcements on May 27, 1951. But the UN forces soon broke off their pursuit on June 1, and armistice negotiations started on July 10, 1951.

The presence of UN forces at the north of the 38th Parallel, however, prompted the PVA to plan a limited offensive dubbed the "Six Phase Campaign". Although the offensive was cancelled on September 4, 1951, it allowed the PLA 20th Army to be deployed in the Kumsong area by early September. The PVA had also decided to assume defensive posture on September 4 while postponing all major offensive operations, and the West Coast and East Coast Commands were created to guard against UN amphibious landings as the result. Finally, the Chinese Central Military Commission authorized the PLA Air Force to join the war in September 1951 as a response to Operation Strangle II conducted by the US Far East Air Force. By the end of October 1951, the total PVA strength in Korea reached 1.15 million men, including 19 infantry corps, nine artillery divisions, five tank regiments, 12 air force divisions, four railway engineering divisions and eight logistical corps.

=== Chinese People's Volunteer Army Headquarters ===
| Commander | Peng Dehuai |
| Commissar | Peng Dehuai |
| Chief of Staff | Xie Fang (nominal) (Note: Xie Fang served as a representative in the armistice negotiation until the breakdown of armistice talks on October 8, 1952. See Chinese Military Science Academy 2000b, pp. 557, 563 and Hermes 1992, pp. 281, 422.) |
| Chief of Staff | Zhang Wenzhou (acting) |
| Political Director | Gan Siqi |

=== Frontline ===
PVA Headquarters Subordinate Corps
| Unit | Commander | Sub-units | Notes |
|---|---|---|---|
| 42nd Corps | Commander Wu Ruilin; Commissar Zhou Biao | 124th Division; 125th Division; 126th Division | Returned to the front in early June 1951. |

3rd Army Commander: Chen Geng Commissar: Chen Geng
| Unit | Commander | Sub-units | Notes |
|---|---|---|---|
| 12th Corps | Commander Zeng Shaoshan; Commissar Li Zhen | 31st Division; 34th Division; 35th Division | Reserve unit. |
| 15th Corps | Commander Qin Jiwei; Commissar Gu Jingsheng | 29th Division; 44th Division; 45th Division | Reserve unit. |
| 60th Corps | Commander Shu Jie; Commissar Yuan Ziqin | 179th Division; 180th Division; 181st Division | Reserve unit. |

9th Army Commander: Song Shi-Lun Commissar: Song Shi-Lun
| Unit | Commander | Sub-units | Notes |
|---|---|---|---|
| 26th Corps | Commander Zhang Renchu; Commissar Li Yaowen | 76th Division; 77th Division; 78th Division | Returned to China in June 1952. |

19th Army Commander: Yang Dezhi Commissar: Li Zhimin
| Unit | Commander | Sub-units | Notes |
|---|---|---|---|
| 47th Corps | Commander Cao Lihuai; Commissar Li Renlin | 139th Division; 140th Division; 141st Division | Entered Korea on April 11, 1951, as airfield construction labor. Did not participate in the Fifth Phase Campaign. |
| 63rd Corps | Commander Fu Chongbi; Commissar Long Daoquan | 187th Division; 188th Division; 189th Division | Reserve unit. |
| 64th Corps | Commander Zeng Siyu; Commissar Wang Zhao | 190th Division; 191st Division; 192nd Division | |
| 65th Corps | Commander Xiao Yingtang; Commissar Wang Daobang | 193rd Division; 194th Division; 195th Division | |

20th Army Commander: Yang Chengwu Commissar: Zhang Nansheng
| Unit | Commander | Sub-units | Notes |
|---|---|---|---|
| 67th Corps | Commander Li Xiang; Commissar Kuang Fuzhao | 199th Division; 200th Division; 201st Division | Entered Korea in June 1951. |
| 68th Corps | Commander Chen Fangren; Commissar Li Chengrui | 202nd Division; 203rd Division; 204th Division | Reserve unit. Entered Korea in June 1951. |

=== West coast defense ===
West Coast Command Commander: Han Xianchu
| Unit | Commander | Sub-units | Notes |
|---|---|---|---|
| 38th Corps | Commander Liang Xingchu; Commissar Liu Xiyuan | 112th Division; 113th Division; 114th Division | Reserve unit. Did not return to the front until May 1952. |
| 39th Corps | Commander Wu Xinquan; Commissar Li Xuesan | 115th Division; 116th Division; 117th Division | Reserve unit. |
| 40th Corps | Commander Wen Yucheng; Commissar Yuan Shengping | 118th Division; 119th Division; 120th Division | Reserve unit. |
| 50th Corps | Commander Zeng Zesheng; Commissar Xu Wenlie | 148th Division; 149th Division; 150th Division | Reentered Korea around July–August 1951. |

=== East coast defense ===
East Coast Command Commander: Song Shi-Lun
| Unit | Commander | Sub-units | Notes |
|---|---|---|---|
| 16th Corps | Commander Yin Xianbing; Commissar Chen Yunkai | 47th Division | Reserve unit. Stationed in Manchuria during this period. |
| 20th Corps | Commander and Commissar Zhang Yixiang | 58th Division; 59th Division; 60th Division | Reserve unit. |
| 27th Corps | Commander Peng Deqing; Commissar Zeng Ruqing | 79th Division; 80th Division; 81st Division | Reserve unit. |

=== Air ===
Air Force Command Commander: Liu Zhen
| Unit | Commander | Sub-units (Note: Following the Soviet model, a typical Chinese air force division is only composed of two regiments. See Zhang 2004, p. 108) | Notes |
|---|---|---|---|
| 2nd Aviation Division | Commander Zhang Qinhe; Commissar Zhang Baichun | 4th Regiment; 6th Regiment | Mixed La-11/MiG-15 fighter unit. Entered combat in October 1951 and returned to China in January 1952. |
| 3rd Aviation Division | Commander Yuan Bin; Commissar Gao Houliang | 7th Regiment; 9th Regiment | MiG-15 fighter unit. Entered combat in October 1951 and returned to China in January 1952. |
| 4th Aviation Division | Commander Fang Ziyi; Commissar Xie Xiyu | 10th Regiment; 12th Regiment | MiG-15 fighter unit. Elements of the division were assigned to the Soviet 64th Aviation Corps for training purposes and engaged UN air forces from December 1950 to July 1951 under Soviet command. Officially entered combat as an independent unit in September 1951 and returned to China in October 1951. |
| 5th Aviation Division | Commander Ma Yong; Commissar Ma Zeying | 13th Regiment; 15th Regiment | Il-10 ground attack unit and a part of the short-lived Ground Attack Command. It did not enter combat in Korea due to the lack of Korean airfields and returned to China in November 1951. |
| 6th Aviation Division | Commander Bei Sha; Commissar Zhang Zhiyong | 16th Regiment; 18th Regiment | Mixed MiG-9/MiG-15 fighter unit. Entered combat in November 1951 and returned to China in March 1952. |
| 7th Aviation Division | Commander Han Cesan; Commissar Qiu Renhua | 19th Regiment; 21st Regiment | Mixed MiG-9/MiG-15 fighter unit. It did not enter combat in Korea and returned to Northern China in November 1951. |
| 8th Aviation Division | Commander Wu Kai; Commissar Ge Zhenyue | 22nd Regiment; 24th Regiment | Tu-2 bomber unit and a part of the short-lived Bomber Command. After entering combat in Korea in October 1951, it was involve in a bombing campaign against South Korean outposts on the Pansong archipelago. The campaign ended with a disastrous bombing mission to the Taehwado island which resulted in four Tu-2 bombers, three La-11 fighters and one MiG-15 fighter being shot down by the US 4th Fighter Wing on November 30, 1951. All Chinese bomber units in Korea were grounded in the aftermath of this disaster. Returned to China in March 1952. |
| 9th Aviation Division | Commander He Jilin; Commissar Xu Xinghua | 25th Regiment; 27th Regiment | La-9 fighter unit and a part of the short-lived Ground Attack Command. It did not enter combat in Korea due to the lack of Korean airfields and returned to China in November 1951. |
| 10th Aviation Division | Commander Liu Shanben; Commissar Wang Xuewu | 28th Regiment; 30th Regiment | Tu-2 bomber unit and a part of the short-lived Bomber Command. After entering combat in Korea in October 1951 it was grounded due to the Taehwado island disaster. Returned to China in March 1952. |
| 11th Aviation Division | Commander Zhang Qiangsheng; Commissar Huang Feng | 31st Regiment; 33rd Regiment | Il-10 ground attack unit and a part of the short-lived Ground Attack Command. It did not enter combat in Korea due to the lack of Korean airfields and returned to China in November 1951. |
| 14th Aviation Division | Commander Wang Yuhuai; Commissar Xie Jiyou | 40th Regiment; 42nd Regiment | Mixed MiG-9/MiG-15 fighter unit. Entered combat in November 1951 and returned to China in February 1952. |
| 15th Aviation Division | Commander Huang Yuting; Commissar Cui Wenbin | 43rd Regiment; 45th Regiment | MiG-15 fighter unit. Did not enter combat during this period. |

23rd Army Commander: Jin Qiwu Commissar: Gao Kelin
| Unit | Commander | Sub-units | Notes |
|---|---|---|---|
| 36th Corps | Commander Wang Jianye; Commissar Kang Jianmin | 106th Division; 107th Division; 108th Division | Entered Korea in September 1951 and tasked with constructing airfields in Korea for bomber and ground attack aircraft. Returned to China in November 1951 after UN bombings made the construction efforts impossible. |
| 37th Corps | Commander Zhang Shizhen; Commissar Gu Jingsheng | 109th Division; 110th Division; 111th Division | Entered Korea in September 1951 and tasked with constructing airfields in Korea for bomber and ground attack aircraft. Returned to China in November 1951 after UN bombings made the construction efforts impossible. |

=== Supports ===
| Unit | Commander | Sub-units | Notes |
|---|---|---|---|
| Armor Command Bureau | Director Huang Huxian | 1st Tank Regiment; 2nd Tank Regiment; 3rd Tank Regiment; 6th Independent Tank Regiment; Independent Motorized Infantry Regiment | |
| Artillery Command Bureau | Director Kuang Yumin | 1st Artillery Division; 2nd Artillery Division; 7th Artillery Division; 8th Artillery Division; 21st Rocket Artillery Division; 31st Anti-Tank Artillery Division; 61st Anti-Aircraft Artillery Division; 62nd Anti-Aircraft Artillery Division; 63rd Anti-Aircraft Artillery Division; 64th Anti-Aircraft Artillery Division | |
| Engineer Command Bureau | Director Chen Zhengfeng | 1st Engineer Regiment; 3rd Engineer Regiment; 4th Engineer Regiment; 7th Engineer Regiment; 10th Engineer Regiment; 14th Engineer Regiment; 15th Engineer Regiment; 16th Engineer Regiment; 17th Engineer Regiment; 18th Engineer Regiment; 21st Engineer Regiment; 22nd Engineer Regiment | Subordinate of Logistics Command. |
| Logistics Command | Commander Hong Xuezhi; Commissar Zhou Chunquan | 1st Detachment; 2nd Detachment; 3rd Detachment; 4th Detachment; 5th Detachment; 6th Detachment; 18th Public Security Division | Composed of 28 service stations, 19 supply regiments, 15 temporary truck regiments, three security regiments plus one battalion, five Public Security regiments and one Public Order regiment. Also in control of Engineer Command Bureau. |
| Railway Transport Command | Commander He Jinnian; Commissar Zhang Mingyuan | 1st Railway Engineer Division; 2nd Railway Engineer Division; 3rd Railway Engineer Division; 4th Railway Engineer Division | Composed of eight bridging regiments and four track regiments. |

== Collapse of armistice negotiation (September 18 – November 25, 1952) ==
With the end Operation Commando on October 23, 1951, signaling the end of UN limited offensives, the Korean front had settled into a period of stalemate. Although the Chinese had lost 36,000 ground troops from the UN offensives, the losses were mostly replaced by the summer of 1952. The PVA Air Force, on the other hand, suffered major setbacks in constructing airfields in Korea. By late December 1951, all PVA Air Force personnel were stationed back to China due to the lack of airfields, and its ground support missions were soon abandoned.

With the front stabilized and no major offensives in planning, the PVA focused its attentions on logistics build up, troop rotations and political controls. In the area of logistics, the Railway Transport Forward Command was established in August 1951, and its Anti-Aircraft Artillery Command Bureau was organized in December 1951. This allowed four additional anti-aircraft artillery regiments to be deployed in Korea. The PVA headquarters had also planned to rotate all troops in Korea by the end of 1953, and the Chinese Central Military Commission authorized the PLA 23rd, 24th and 46th Corps to replace 20th, 27th and 42nd Corps by September 1952. Finally, the political mobilization programs strengthened the Communist Party's hold on the field units, and mass purges were carried out against undesirables while award systems were established for role models.

The armistice negotiations at Panmunjom began to fall apart in September 1952, primarily due to Sino-Korean insistence that all prisoners of war be repatriated to their respective original countries, regardless of their personal preferences. As a significant number of Chinese and North Korean POWs had expressed their desire to defect permanently to South Korea or Taiwan, the demand was met with strong opposition from the United States and South Korea. Feeling that the negotiations would soon fail, military commanders on both sides approved numerous tactical plans as means of applying pressure on their opponents. In late September, the PVA authorized its frontline troops to conduct tactical strikes against more than 20 UN outposts. The armistice negotiations officially ceased on October 8, 1952.

=== Chinese People's Volunteer Army Headquarters ===
| Commander | Peng Dehuai (nominal) (Note: Recalled back to China in April 1952 for medical reasons. Peng served the rest of the war by administering daily operations in the Central Military Commission. See Zhang 1995, pp. 217, 304.) |
| Commander | Deng Hua (acting) |
| Commissar | Peng Dehuai (nominal) |
| Commissar | Deng Hua (acting) |
| Chief of Staff | Xie Fang (nominal) |
| Chief of Staff | Zhang Wenzhou (acting) |
| Political Director | Gan Siqi |

=== Frontline ===
PVA Headquarters Subordinate Corps
| Unit | Commander | Sub-units | Notes |
|---|---|---|---|
| 38th Corps | Commander Jiang Yonghui; Commissar Wu Dai | 112th Division; 113th Division; 114th Division | |
| 39th Corps | Commander and Commissar Wu Xinquan | 115th Division; 116th Division; 117th Division | |
| 40th Corps | Commander Wen Yucheng; Commissar Yuan Shengping | 118th Division; 119th Division; 120th Division | |
| 46th Corps | Commander Xiao Quanfu; Commissar Wu Baoshan | 133rd Division; 136th Division; 137th Division | Entered Korea in September 1952. |
| 47th Corps | Commander Cao Lihuai; Commissar Liu Xianquan | 139th Division; 140th Division; 141st Division | Reserve unit. |

3rd Army Commander: Wang Jinshan (Note: Cheng Geng briefly commanded PVA in June 1952, then left for China in July 1952 to build the PLA Military Academy of Engineering and Technology. See Zhang 1995, p. 217.) Commissar: She Yide
| Unit | Commander | Sub-units | Notes |
|---|---|---|---|
| 12th Corps | Commander Zeng Shaoshan; Commissar Li Zhen | 31st Division; 34th Division; 35th Division | |
| 15th Corps | Commander Qin Jiwei; Commissar Gu Jingsheng | 29th Division; 44th Division; 45th Division | |
| 60th Corps | Commander Zhang Zuliang; Commissar Yuan Ziqin | 179th Division; 180th Division; 181st Division | |

19th Army Commander: Han Xianchu (Note: Yang Dezhi became the Deputy Commander of PVA in July 1952. See Zhang 1995, p. 217.) Commissar: Li Zhimin
| Unit | Commander | Sub-units | Notes |
|---|---|---|---|
| 63rd Corps | Commander Fu Chongbi; Commissar Long Daoquan | 187th Division; 188th Division; 189th Division | Reserve unit. |
| 65th Corps | Commander and Commissar Wang Daobang | 193rd Division; 194th Division; 195th Division | |

20th Army Commander: Zheng Weishan (Note: Formerly the Deputy Commander of 19th Army. Zheng Weishan replaced Yang Chengwu in July 1952. See Zhang 1995, p. 217.) Commissar: Zhang Nansheng
| Unit | Commander | Sub-units | Notes |
|---|---|---|---|
| 67th Corps | Commander Qiu Wei; Commissar Kuang Fuzhao | 199th Division; 200th Division; 201st Division | Reserve unit. |
| 68th Corps | Commander Chen Fangren; Commissar Li Chengrui | 202nd Division; 203rd Division; 204th Division | |

=== West coast defense ===
West Coast Command Commander: Liang Xingchu (acting)
| Unit | Commander | Sub-units | Notes |
|---|---|---|---|
| 42nd Corps | Commander: Wu Ruilin; Commissar: Guo Chengzhu | 124th Division; 125th Division; 126th Division | Reserve unit. Returned to China in November 1952. |
| 50th Corps | Commander Zeng Zesheng; Commissar Xu Wenlie | 148th Division; 149th Division; 150th Division | |
| 64th Corps | Commander Tang Zian; Commissar Wang Zhao | 190th Division; 191st Division; 192nd Division | Reserve unit. |

=== East coast defense ===
9th Army Commander: Wang Jianan (Note: Song Shi-Lun returned to China in July 1952. See Zhang 1995, p. 217.) Commissar: Wang Jianan
| Unit | Commander | Sub-units | Notes |
|---|---|---|---|
| 20th Corps | Commander Zhang Yixiang; Commissar Tan Youming | 58th Division; 59th Division; 60th Division | Reserve unit. Returned to China in October 1952. |
| 23rd Corps | Commander Zhong Guochu; Commissar Lu Sheng | 67th Division; 69th Division; 73rd Division | Entered Korea in September 1952. |
| 24th Corps | Commander and Commissar Pi Dingjun | 70th Division; 72nd Division; 74th Division | Entered Korea in September 1952. |
| 27th Corps | Commander Peng Deqing; Commissar Zeng Ruqing | 79th Division; 80th Division; 81st Division | Reserve unit. Returned to China in October 1952. |

=== Air ===
Air Force Command Commander: Nie Fengzhi (acting) (Note: Liu Zhen returned to China around early July 1952. See Zhang 2004, p. 176.)
| Unit | Commander | Sub-units | Notes |
|---|---|---|---|
| 3rd Aviation Division | Commander Yuan Bin; Commissar Luo Ping | 7th Regiment; 9th Regiment | MiG-15 fighter unit. Reentered combat in May 1952 and returned to China in January 1953. |
| 4th Aviation Division | Commander Fang Ziyi; Commissar Ye Songsheng | 10th Regiment; 12th Regiment | MiG-15 fighter unit and started its third tour in December 1952. Previously entered combat during January–May 1952 as part of its second tour. |
| 6th Aviation Division | Commander Bei Sha; Commissar Zhang Zhiyong | 16th Regiment; 18th Regiment | Mixed MiG-9/MiG-15 fighter unit. Reentered combat in December 1952. |
| 12th Aviation Division | Commander Wang Mingli; Commissar Li Minggang | 24th Regiment; 36th Regiment | Mixed MiG-9/MiG-15 fighter unit. Entered combat in March 1952 and returned to China in March 1953. |
| 15th Aviation Division | Commander Liu Chengqi; Commissar Cui Wenbin | 43rd Regiment; 45th Regiment | MiG-15 fighter unit and started its second tour in October 1952. Previously entered combat during January–May 1952 as part of its first tour. |
| 17th Aviation Division | Commander Li Shurong; Commissar Luo Bin | 49th Regiment; 51st Regiment | Mixed MiG-9/MiG-15 fighter unit. Entered combat in March 1952. |
| 18th Aviation Division | Commander Wang Dinglie; Commissar Li Zhensheng | 52nd Regiment; 54th Regiment | MiG-15 fighter unit. Entered combat in March 1952 and returned to China in March 1953. |

3rd Aviation Corps Commander: Zeng Guohua Commissar: Li Zaishan
| Unit | Commander | Sub-units | Notes |
|---|---|---|---|
| 5th Aviation Division | Commissar Yu Yinglong | 13th Regiment; 15th Regiment | Il-10 ground attack unit and under the control of the PLA North East Military Region Air Force. Did not enter combat during this period. |
| 8th Aviation Division | Commander Wu Kai; Commissar Sun Cunfeng | 22nd Regiment; 24th Regiment | Tu-2 bomber unit and under the control of the PLA North East Military Region Air Force. Did not enter combat during this period. |
| 9th Aviation Division | Commander He Jili; Commissar Xie Jiyou | 25th Regiment; 27th Regiment | La-9 fighter unit and under the control of the PLA North East Military Region Air Force. Did not enter combat during this period. |

=== Railway ===
Railway Transport Forward Command Commander: Liu Juying Commissar: Liu Juying
| Unit | Commander | Sub-units | Notes |
|---|---|---|---|
| Railway Repair Command Bureau | Commander Peng Min | 1st Railway Engineer Division; 2nd Railway Engineer Division; 3rd Railway Engineer Division; 4th Railway Engineer Division | Composed of eight bridging regiments, four track regiments and four independent regiments. |
| Anti-Aircraft Artillery Command Bureau | Commander Wu Changchi | 502nd Anti-Aircraft Artillery Regiment; 509th Anti-Aircraft Artillery Regiment; 511th Anti-Aircraft Artillery Regiment; 512th Anti-Aircraft Artillery Regiment; 523rd Anti-Aircraft Artillery Regiment; 533rd Anti-Aircraft Artillery Regiment; Anti-Aircraft Machine-Gun Regiment; 101st Searchlight Regiment | Also assumes control of 62nd, 63rd and 64th Anti-Aircraft Artillery Division from the Artillery Director Office. |

=== Supports ===
| Unit | Commander | Sub-units | Notes |
|---|---|---|---|
| Armor Command Bureau | Commander Zhao Jie; Commissar Li Zhizhou | 1st Independent Tank Regiment; 2nd Independent Tank Regiment; 4th Tank Regiment; 5th Tank Regiment; 6th Tank Regiment | Elements of PLA 3rd Tank Division arrived in Korea in June 1952. Its 4th, 5th and 6th Tank Regiments relieved 1st, 2nd and 3rd Tank Regiments in June, while its 2nd Independent Tank Regiment relieved 1st Independent Tank Regiment in October. |
| Artillery Director Office | Director Kuang Yumin | 1st Artillery Division; 2nd Artillery Division; 7th Artillery Division; 8th Artillery Division; 21st Rocket Artillery Division; 31st Anti-Tank Artillery Division; 61st Anti-Aircraft Artillery Division; 62nd Anti-Aircraft Artillery Division; 63rd Anti-Aircraft Artillery Division; 64th Anti-Aircraft Artillery Division | Its 62nd, 63rd and 64th Anti-Aircraft Artillery Divisions were under the operational control of Railway Transport Forward Command Anti-Aircraft Artillery Command Bureau. |
| Engineer Command Bureau | Commander Tan Shanhe | 4th Engineer Regiment; 7th Engineer Regiment; 10th Engineer Regiment; 12th Engineer Regiment; 14th Engineer Regiment; 15th Engineer Regiment; 16th Engineer Regiment; 17th Engineer Regiment; 18th Engineer Regiment; 21st Engineer Regiment; 22nd Engineer Regiment | |
| Logistics Command | Commander Hong Xuezhi; Commissar Zhou Chunquan | 1st Detachment; 2nd Detachment; 3rd Detachment; 4th Detachment; 5th Detachment; 18th Public Security Division | Composed of 30 service stations, 13 truck regiments, 16 hospitals, five security regiments, three Public Security regiments and one Public Order regiment. |

== Signing of armistice agreement (May 13 – July 27, 1953) ==
The fighting that followed the collapse of the armistice negotiation were some of the worst of 1952. The Battle of White Horse had crippled four regiments from the PVA 38th Corps, while Operation Showdown resulted in 11,500 Chinese casualties. Despite the heavy losses, the Chinese managed to exhaust the UN forces through two months of attrition warfare, and the United Nations Command soon renounced all major ground operations for the rest of the war. The front was stabilized once again by November 1952.

Despite the success on the ground, the PVA Air Force was unable to challenge the air supremacy of the US Air Force. By May 1953, the US Air Force was able to launch 22,639 sorties per month against North Korean targets, while the PVA Air Force could only respond with 1,164 sorties during the same time period. The situation was further worsen when the Soviet Union withdrew 40 percent of its aircraft in the spring of 1953. The North Korean Premier Kim Il Sung began to sue for peace under the constant UN bombardment, and the PVA could only counter by encouraging the North Koreans to continue night bombing missions with Po-2 biplanes.

Dwight D. Eisenhower was elected as the President of the United States on November 4, 1952. After being elected, Eisenhower promised to end the Korean War with "deeds", not "words", while amphibious exercises were carried out around Korea. Although Eisenhower had no plans to end the war through military victory, the Chinese leadership interpreted those signs as an impending amphibious attack. As the result, the PLA 1st, 16th, 21st, 54th Infantry Corps, 33rd Infantry Division and 1st Tank Division were ordered into Korea on December 17, 1952. Those new reinforcements soon brought the total PVA strength to 1.35 million men by the summer of 1953.

To the surprise of Chinese leadership, the expected UN attack did not occur, and the armistice negotiations was later resumed on April 26, 1953. In order to end the war on favorable terms to the Communist, the reinforced PVA struck 10 UN outposts in early May 1953, while two major offensives were carried out against South Korean forces on June 10 and July 13 respectively. The resulting clashes soon produced 124,912 Chinese casualties against 60,360 UN losses from May to July. The armistice was signed at 10:12 on July 27, 1953, and the PVA ended the war with a total of 1.35 million men, including 19 infantry corps, 15 artillery divisions, 9 air force divisions, 10 railway engineer divisions and one Public Security division. The last Chinese formations left Korea on October 26, 1958.

=== Chinese People's Volunteer Army Headquarters ===
| Commander | Peng Dehuai (nominal) |
| Commander | Deng Hua (acting) |
| Commissar | Peng Dehuai (nominal) |
| Commissar | Deng Hua (acting) |
| Chief of Staff | Li Da (Note: Relieved Xie Fang in May 1953. See Zhang 1995, p. 236.) |
| Political Director | Li Zhimin (Note: Relieved Gan Siqi in May 1953. See Zhang 1995, p. 236.) |

=== Frontline ===
9th Army Commander: Wang Jianan Commissar: Wang Jianan
| Unit | Commander | Sub-units | Notes |
|---|---|---|---|
| 16th Corps | Commander Yin Xianbing (Note: Yin was soon removed from command on charges of sexual misconduct and abuse of authority. See Zhang 1995, p. 211.); Commissar Chen Yunkai | 32nd Division; 46th Division; 47th Division | Reserve unit. Entered Korea in January 1953 and left Korea in April 1958. |
| 23rd Corps | Commander Zhong Guochu; Commissar Lu Sheng | 67th Division; 69th Division; 73rd Division | Left Korea in March 1958. |
| 24th Corps | Commander and Commissar Zhang Zhen | 70th Division; 72nd Division; 74th Division | Left Korea in April 1955. |
| 47th Corps | Commander Zhang Tianyun; Commissar Chen Fahong | 139th Division; 140th Division; 141st Division | Reserve unit. Left Korea in September 1954. |

19th Army Commander: Huang Yongsheng (Note: Relieved Han Xianchu in May 1953. See Zhang 1995, p. 237.)
| Unit | Commander | Sub-units | Notes |
|---|---|---|---|
| 1st Corps | Commander Huang Xinting; Commissar Liang Renjie | 1st Division; 2nd Division; 7th Division | Enter Korea on February 2, 1953. Last Chinese unit stationed in Korea before its withdrawal in October 1958. |
| 46th Corps | Commander Xiao Quanfu; Commissar Wu Baoshan | 133rd Division; 136th Division; 137th Division | Left Korea in October 1955. |
| 63rd Corps | Commander Fu Chongbi; Commissar Long Daoquan | 187th Division; 188th Division; 189th Division | Reserve unit. Left Korea in September 1953. |
| 64th Corps | Commander Tang Zian; Commissar Huang Wenming | 190th Division; 191st Division; 192nd Division | Reserve unit. Left Korea in August 1953. |
| 65th Corps | Commander and Commissar Wang Daobang | 193rd Division; 194th Division; 195th Division | Left Korea in October 1953. |

20th Army Commander: Yang Yong (Note: Relieved Zheng Wishan in May 1953. See Zhang 1995, p. 237.) Commissar: Wang Ping (Note: Relieved Zhang Nansheng in May 1953. See Zhang 1995, p. 237.)
| Unit | Commander | Sub-units | Notes |
|---|---|---|---|
| 21st Corps | Commander Wu Yongxiang; Commissar Xie Fulin | 61st Division; 62nd Division; 63rd Division | Entered Korea in March 1953. Left Korea in August 1958. |
| 54th Corps | Commander Ding Sheng; Commissar Xie Ming | 130th Division; 134th Division; 135th Division | Entered Korea around May 1953. Left Korea in August 1958. |
| 60th Corps | Commander Zhang Zuliang; Commissar Zhao Tian | 179th Division; 180th Division; 181st Division | Left Korea in October 1953. |
| 67th Corps | Commander Qiu Wei; Commissar Kuang Fuzhao | 199th Division; 200th Division; 201st Division | Left Korea in September 1954. |
| 68th Corps | Commander Chen Fangren; Commissar Li Chengrui | 202nd Division; 203rd Division; 204th Division | Left Korea in April 1955. |

=== West coast defense ===
West Coast Command Commander: Deng Hua
| Unit | Commander | Sub-units | Notes |
|---|---|---|---|
| 38th Corps | Commander Jiang Yonghui; Commissar Wu Dai | 112th Division; 113th Division; 114th Division | Left Korea on July 10, 1953. |
| 39th Corps | Commander Zhang Jiecheng; Commissar Shi Ying | 115th Division; 116th Division; 117th Division | Reserve unit. Left Korea in May 1953. |
| 40th Corps | Commander and Commissar Wen Yucheng | 118th Division; 119th Division; 120th Division | Reserve unit. Left Korea in July 1953. |
| 50th Corps | Commander Zeng Zesheng; Commissar Xu Wenlie | 148th Division; 149th Division; 150th Division | Left Korea in April 1954. |
| 2nd Armor Command Bureau | Director Luo Jie; Commissar Mao Pengfei | 1st Tank Regiment; 2nd Tank Regiment; 3rd Independent Tank Regiment; Artillery Regiment | |
| Naval Office | Unknown | Navy Fast Attack Craft Group | Formed in December 1952. |

=== East coast defense ===
3rd Army Commander: Xu Shiyou (Note: Relieved Wang Jinshan in May 1953. See Chinese Military Science Academy 2000b, p. 575.) Commissar: She Yide
| Unit | Commander | Sub-units | Notes |
|---|---|---|---|
| 12th Corps | Commissar Li Zhen | 31st Division; 34th Division; 35th Division | Reserve unit. Left Korea in April 1954. |
| 15th Corps | Commander Li Chengfang; Commissar Gu Jingsheng | 29th Division; 44th Division; 45th Division | Reserve unit. Left Korea in May 1954. |
| 33rd Independent Division | Commander Tong Guogui; Commissar Shi Jingban | 97th Regiment; 98th Regiment; 99th Regiment; Artillery Regiment; Tank Regiment | Entered Korea in December 1952. Left Korea in September 1954. |

=== Air ===
Air Force Command Commander: Nie Fengzhi (acting)
| Unit | Commander | Sub-units | Notes |
|---|---|---|---|
| 3rd Aviation Division | Commander Yuan Bin; Commissar Luo Ping | 7th Regiment; 9th Regiment | MiG-15 fighter unit. Reserve unit and did not enter combat during this period. |
| 4th Aviation Division | Commander Fang Ziyi; Commissar Ye Songsheng | 10th Regiment; 12th Regiment | MiG-15 fighter unit. Ended its third combat tour in July 1953. |
| 6th Aviation Division | Commander Bei Sha | 16th Regiment; 18th Regiment | Mixed MiG-9/MiG-15 fighter unit. Ended its second combat tour in July 1953. |
| 12th Aviation Division | Commander Wang Mingli; Commissar Kang Yushan | 34th Regiment; 36th Regiment | Mixed MiG-9/MiG-15 fighter unit. Reserve unit and did not enter combat during this period. |
| 14th Aviation Division | Commander Wang Yuhuai; Commissar Zhao Shaochang | 42nd Regiment | Mixed MiG-9/MiG-15 fighter unit. Started its second combat tour in April 1953 and ceased combat in July 1953. |
| 15th Aviation Division | Commander Liu Chengqi; Commissar Cui Wenbin | 43rd Regiment; 45th Regiment | MiG-15 fighter unit. Ended its second tour in July 1953. |
| 16th Aviation Division | Commander Sun Tongsheng; Commissar Zhang Yonggeng | 46th Regiment; 48th Regiment | Mixed MiG-9/MiG-15 fighter unit. Entered combat in January 1953 and ceased combat in July 1953. |
| 17th Aviation Division | Commander Li Shurong; Commissar Luo Bin | 49th Regiment; 51st Regiment | Mixed MiG-9/MiG-15 fighter unit. Ceased combat in July 1953. |

Dandong Air Defense District Command (Note: Subordinate of PVA Air Force Command, it was created on April 6, 1953 by combining all anti-aircraft troops in Korea and along the Yalu River. See Hu & Ma 1987, p. 192.) Commander: Cheng Jun
| Unit | Commander | Sub-units | Notes |
|---|---|---|---|
| Forward Command Bureau | Director Wu Changchi | 502nd Anti-Aircraft Artillery Regiment; 507th Anti-Aircraft Artillery Regiment; 509th Anti-Aircraft Artillery Regiment; 510th Anti-Aircraft Artillery Regiment; 512th Anti-Aircraft Artillery Regiment; 515th Anti-Aircraft Artillery Regiment; 523rd Anti-Aircraft Artillery Regiment; 533rd Anti-Aircraft Artillery Regiment; 542nd Anti-Aircraft Artillery Regiment; 401st Searchlight Regiment; 402nd Searchlight Regiment; 205th Sentry Regiment | |
| 62nd Anti-Aircraft Artillery Division | Commander Wang Xing; Commissar Qiu Tiexiong | 604th Anti-Aircraft Artillery Regiment; 605th Anti-Aircraft Artillery Regiment; 606th Anti-Aircraft Artillery Regiment | |
| 63rd Anti-Aircraft Artillery Division | Commander Wu Zhongtai; Commissar Li Yunlong | 607th Anti-Aircraft Artillery Regiment; 608th Anti-Aircraft Artillery Regiment; 609th Anti-Aircraft Artillery Regiment | Left Korea in September 1955. |
| 64th Anti-Aircraft Artillery Division | Commander Lu Rui; Commissar Peng Danling | 610th Anti-Aircraft Artillery Regiment; 611th Anti-Aircraft Artillery Regiment; 612th Anti-Aircraft Artillery Regiment | Left Korea in August 1954. |
| 65th Anti-Aircraft Artillery Division | Commander Yuan Jinli; Commissar Shi Youhe | 613th Anti-Aircraft Artillery Regiment; 614th Anti-Aircraft Artillery Regiment; 615th Anti-Aircraft Artillery Regiment | Entered Korea in June 1953. Left Korea in December 1954. |
| 102nd Anti-Aircraft Artillery Division | Unknown | 501st Anti-Aircraft Artillery Regiment; 504th Anti-Aircraft Artillery Regiment; 506th Anti-Aircraft Artillery Regiment; 411th Searchlight Regiment | Responsible for air defense north of the Yalu River. |

=== Railway ===
Railway Transport Forward Command Commander: Liu Juying Commissar: Cui Tianmin
| Unit | Commander | Sub-units | Notes |
|---|---|---|---|
| Railway Repair Command Bureau | Commander Liu Ke | 1st Railway Engineer Division; 2nd Railway Engineer Division; 3rd Railway Engineer Division; 4th Railway Engineer Division | All Chinese railway unit left Korea by September 25, 1955. |
| Railway Construction Command Bureau | Director Guo Weicheng | 5th Railway Engineer Division; 6th Railway Engineer Division; 7th Railway Engineer Division; 9th Railway Engineer Division; 10th Railway Engineer Division; 11th Railway Engineer Division | All Chinese railway unit left Korea by September 25, 1955. |
| Railway Military Administration Bureau | Director Liu Juying | 1st Sub-Bureau; 2nd Sub-Bureau; 3rd Sub-Bureau; 4th Sub-Bureau; 5th Sub-Bureau | All Chinese railway unit left Korea by September 25, 1955. |

=== Supports ===
| Unit | Commander | Sub-units | Notes |
|---|---|---|---|
| 1st Armor Command Bureau | Commander Zhao Jie; Commissar Li Zhizhou | 2nd Independent Tank Regiment; 4th Tank Regiment; 5th Tank Regiment; 6th Tank Regiment | Left Korea in May 1954. |
| Artillery Command Bureau | Commander Gao Cunxin; Commissar Liu He | 1st Artillery Division; 2nd Artillery Division; 3rd Artillery Division; 7th Artillery Division; 8th Artillery Division; 21st Rocket Artillery Division; 22nd Rocket Artillery Division; 33rd Anti-Tank Artillery Division; 61st Anti-Aircraft Artillery Division | 33rd Anti-Tank Artillery Division entered Korea in early 1953 with two regiments of the 31st Anti-Tank Artillery Division transferred under its command. 22nd Rocket Artillery Division entered Korea in June 1953. 3rd Artillery Division entered Korea in July 1953. All Chinese artillery units left Korea by February 1957. |
| Engineer Command Bureau | Commander Tan Shanhe | 3rd Engineer Regiment; 4th Engineer Regiment; 6th Engineer Regiment; 7th Engineer Regiment; 9th Engineer Regiment; 10th Engineer Regiment; 12th Engineer Regiment; 14th Engineer Regiment; 17th Engineer Regiment; 18th Engineer Regiment; 21st Engineer Regiment; 22nd Engineer Regiment | |
| Logistics Command | Commander Hong Xuezhi | 1st Detachment; 2nd Detachment; 3rd Detachment; 4th Detachment; 5th Detachment; 1st Public Security Division | Composed of 23 service stations, 15 truck regiments, 21 hospitals, five security regiments and six Public Security regiments. |
