= Group army (military unit) =

People's Liberation Army military unit

Group armies (simplified Chinese: 集团军; traditional Chinese: 集團軍; pinyin: jítuán jūn) or army groups or combined corps, are corps-level military formations of the People's Liberation Army Ground Force of China. Despite what the name suggests, current Group Armies are not army-level formations, but corps-sized formations commanding 12 to 14 brigades, roughly equivalent to United States Army Corps.

Some may use or translate 'Group Army' loosely to mean the same as Army Group through various time periods of history, depending on whether the military formation is under Nationalist China (ROC) or Communist China (PRC). Chinese Army Group or Group Army used to be equivalent to field army or army group in other militaries due to translation issues and ambiguity of the Chinese language. This is because while" 军" in Chinese means "corps" when classifying by size or number of troops, it also means (and more frequently so) in common and less precise military usage – any significant grouping of combat troops, such as army, Army group, or even entire military branch.

== National Revolutionary Army ==
By the end of the Second Sino-Japanese War, the National Revolutionary Army had organized 40 army groups. These were roughly equivalent to a field army in other militaries.

== People's Liberation Army ==
=== Armies of the PLA 1948–1985 ===
From November 1948, the People's Liberation Army regularised the existing large number of armies and divisions into some sixty-seven armies of three divisions each. While some formations, such as the 1st Army, survived for over fifty years, a number were quickly amalgamated and disestablished in the early 1950s.

It appears that over 37% (26 of 70) of the seventy new armies may have been disestablished from 1949 to 1953. In 1949, the 8th and 34th Armies were disbanded, (Note: The 34th Army was disbanded in November 1950 but all three of its divisions had been reassigned in 1949: the 100th to the 33rd Army in July; the 101st to the 10th Army/Corps in November, and the 102nd in December to a special assignment but then became the 3rd Artillery Division. In November 1950 the military organs and direct troops of the army became the 13th Public Security Division in East China (PLA360).) in 1950, the 30th and 35th Armies were disbanded in January, the 51st Army on September 24, 1950, (Note: The 211th Division may have become Huanggang Military District, and the 212th another district.) and the 29th, 32nd, and 33rd in November 1950. The 45th and 48th Armies appear to have been broken up in 1951–52; the 48th Army had the 142nd Division become the 11th Public Security Division and the 144th Division transferred to the 21st Army/Corps. The 52nd Army was broken up on September 2, 1951. In 1952, the 3rd, 4th, 9th, 10th, 17th, 18th, 19th, 25th (July 1952), 36th, 37th, 43rd, 44th, and 49th Armies were disbanded. (Note: Regarding the 25th Corps/Army, the second 75 Division Headquarters Air Force, 73rd division was redeployed to the 23rd Army, the 74th Division redeployed to the 24th Army, the 75th division of the group were redeployed first to the 31 Army and then to the Jiangsu military.) The 36th and 37th Armies appear to have both been broken up in February 1952, and both may have been reorganised for engineering tasks. The 44th Army was broken up in October 1952 with headquarters elements possibly transferred to the Navy, the 131st Division to the Navy Qingdao Base and the 132nd Division to the 43rd Army. The 49th Army was broken up in January. (Note: The military adapted for the Air Force 3rd Army, the 145th Division (First Formation) into the 21st Corps, the 146th Division transferred to the Guangxi Military Region, and the 147th Division (First Formation) was reorganised as the 12th Public Security Division.) It appears that the 2nd and 6th Corps were disbanded in 1953. The 5th Army/Corps was reorganised into a military region in October 1954.

After the Landing Operation on Hainan Island, the 43rd Army merged with the Hainan Military Region on July 5, 1952. In September 1968 the 43rd Army was reformed, including the 127th Division, the 128th Division, the 220th Division (renamed the 129th Division on September 19, 1969), to defend Guangxi Guilin. On October 17, 1969, it moved to Henan Luoyang, changed to Wuhan Military Region leadership (129th Division left Guiyang "support left", in January 1973 to build). Zhang Wannian became corps commander in 1981. In October 1985, the 43rd Army was disbanded again. The 127th Division transferred to the 54th Army, and the 128th Division to the 20th Army. The 129th Division was disbanded.

In March 1967, the Central Intelligence Agency identified some 35 field corps:

- Shenyang Military Region: 16th, 23rd, 38th, 39th, 40th, 46th, 50th, 64th.
- Beijing Military Region: 21st, 24th, 63rd, 65th, 66th Army, 69th.
- Jinan Military Region: 26th, 67th, 68th Army.
- Nanjing Military Region: 12th, 20th, 22nd, 27th Army, 60th Army.
- Fuzhou Military Region: 28th Army, 31st Army.
- Guangzhou Military Region: 41st, 42nd, 43rd, 47th, 55th.
- Wuhan Military Region: 1st, 10th Airborne (part of the PLAAF), 15th.
- Kunming Military Region: 13th Army, 14th Army.
- Chengdu Military Region: 54th Army.
- Inner Mongolia, Lanzhou, Tibet, and Xinjiang Military Regions had no armies located within them.

=== PLAGF Group Armies (1985–2016) ===
In the mid-1980s, Deng Xiaoping began to redefine PLA orientation radically, beginning with a reassessment in 1985 of the overall international security environment that lowered the probability of a major or nuclear war. Instead, Deng asserted that China would be confronted with limited, local wars on its periphery. The natural consequence of this sweeping reassessment was an equally comprehensive reorientation of the Chinese military. The number of military regions was reduced from 11 to 7, and the 37 field armies were restructured to bring "tank, artillery, anti-aircraft artillery, engineer, and NBC defense units under a combined arms, corps-level headquarters called the Group Army." Between 1985 and 1988, the 37 field armies were reduced to 24 group armies, and thousands of units at the regimental level and above were disbanded.

— James C. Mulvernon, 'The PLA Army's Struggle for Identity,' in The PLA and China in Transition, INSS/NDU, 2003, 111.

Potential disbanded field armies may have included:

- Shenyang Military Region, 68th Corps. In 1985 the 68th Corps was reorganised as the Chifeng Garrison, in Inner Mongolia but part of the Shenyang MD.
- Beijing Military Region: 66th Army (the Army and the Tianjin Garrison combined), 69 Jun;
- Lanzhou Military Region: 19 Jun
- Wuhan Military Region: 43rd Army (People's Republic of China) – disbanded, see above;
- Nanjing Military Region: 60th Army (People's Republic of China)
- Fuzhou Military Region: 29th Army;
- Guangzhou Military Region: the 55th Army;
- Chengdu Military Region: 50th Army;
- Kunming Military Region: Jun 11. 24 Army

From 1997 to 2000, force reductions resulted in the disbandment of three group armies: the 28th (BMR), 64th (Dalian, Liaoning, SMR), and the 67th Group Army at Zibo, Shandong, in the Jinan Military Region. In September 2003, a further series of reductions were announced, and from 2003 to 2006 the 24th Group Army at Chengde, Hebei, the 63rd Army at Taiyuan, Shaanxi (both BMR), and the 23rd Group Army at Harbin in the Shenyang Military Region were eliminated.

Other PRC Chinese language sources typically describe each army group as having 2 or 3 divisions (mainly infantry but some are armour, motorized or artillery divisions) and further augmented by several brigade or regiment sized 'combat arms'/ 'support-arms' formations e.g. artillery, armour, air defence artillery, motorized (infantry), aviation/helicopter regiment etc.

==== PLA Group Armies and their headquarters up until 2016 ====
- 1st Group Army (Zhejiang, Nanjing Military Region)
- 12th Group Army (Jiangsu, Nanjing Military Region)
- 13th Group Army (Chongqing, Chengdu Military Region)
- 14th Group Army (Kunming, Chengdu Military Region)
- 16th Group Army (Jilin, Shenyang Military Region)
- 20th Group Army (Henan, Jinan Military Region)
- 21st Group Army (Shaaxi, Lanzhou Military Region)
- 26th Group Army (Weifang, Shandong, Jinan Military Region)
- 27th Group Army (Hebei, Beijing Military Region)
- 31st Group Army (Fujian, Nanjing Military Region)
- 38th Group Army (Baoding, Beijing Military Region)
- 39th Group Army (Liaoning, Shenyang Military Region)
- 40th Group Army (Jinzhou, Liaoning, Shenyang Military Region)
- 41st Group Army (Guangxi, Guangzhou Military Region)
- 42nd Group Army (Guangdong, Guangzhou Military Region)
- 47th Group Army (Shaanxi, Lanzhou Military Region)
- 54th Group Army (Henan, Jinan Military Region)
- 65th Group Army (Hebei, Beijing Military Region)

=== PLAGF Group Armies (2016–present) ===
The reform in 2015 was a major restructuring of the People's Liberation Army (PLA), which flattened the command structure and allowed the Chinese Communist Party (CCP) to have more control over the military, with the aim of strengthening the combat capability of the PLA.

Legend:

- Northern Theater Command, TC headquarters at Shenyang, Liaoning;
  - TC Ground Force Headquarters Jinan, Shandong.
    - 78th Group Army (Harbin, Heilongjiang, formerly 16th Group Army);
    - 79th Group Army (Shenyang, Liaoning, formerly 39th Group Army);
    - 80th Group Army (Weifang, Shandong, formerly 26th Group Army).
- Eastern Theater Command, TC headquarters at Nanjing, Jiangsu;
  - TC Ground Force Headquarters Fuzhou, Fujian.
    - 71st Group Army (Xuzhou, Jiangsu, formerly 12th Group Army);
    - 72nd Group Army (Huzhou, Zhejiang, formerly 1st Group Army);
    - 73rd Group Army (Xiamen, Fujian, formerly 31st Group Army).
- Western Theater Command, TC headquarters at Chengdu, Sichuan;
  - TC Ground Force Headquarters Lanzhou, Gansu.
    - 76th Group Army (Xining, Qinghai, formerly 21st Group Army);
    - 77th Group Army (Chongqing, formerly 13th Group Army).
- Southern Theater Command, TC headquarters at Guangzhou, Guangdong;
  - TC Ground Force Headquarters Nanning, Guangxi.
    - 74th Group Army (Huizhou, Guangdong, formerly 42nd Group Army);
    - 75th Group Army (Kunming, Yunnan, formerly 41st Group Army).
- Central Theater Command, TC headquarters at Beijing.
  - TC Ground Force Headquarters Shijiazhuang, Hebei.
    - 81st Group Army (Shijiazhuang, Hebei, formerly 65th Group Army)
    - 82nd Group Army (Baoding, Hebei, formerly 38th Group Army);
    - 83rd Group Army (Xinxiang, Henan, formerly 54th Group Army).

PLA Army groups listed below have been disbanded:

- 14th Group Army
- 20th Group Army
- 27th Group Army
- 40th Group Army
- 47th Group Army

== Structure ==
People's Liberation Army's group armies (combined corps) are divided into Combined Arms Brigades (CA-BDE) and other support elements. Typically, a group army consists of:

- Group army headquarters
- Fire support/artillery brigade
- Air defense brigade
- Army aviation brigade
- Special operation brigade
- Combat support and engineering brigade
- Service support and sustainment brigade
- Six maneuver combined arms brigades (CA-BDEs), including a mix of:
  - Medium combined arms brigade
  - Light combined arms brigade
  - Amphibious combined arms brigade
  - Mountain combined arms brigade
  - Air assault Brigade
  - Heavy combined arms brigade, and each CA-BDE typically includes:
    - Brigade headquarters
    - Fire support/artillery battalion
    - Air-defense battalion
    - Reconnaissance battalion
    - Combat support and engineering battalion
    - Service support and sustainment battalion
    - Four combined arms battalions (CAB), and each CAB includes:
      - Battalion headquarters
      - Two tank companies
      - Two mechanized infantry companies
      - Fire support/artillery company
      - Combat/service/sustainment support company
