= 204th Division =

204th Division may refer to:

- 204th Division (People's Republic of China)
- 204th Infantry Division (German Empire)
- 204th Coastal Division, Italy
- 204th Rifle Division, Soviet Union

== See also ==
- List of military divisions by number
- 204th Brigade (disambiguation)
