= Battle of Unsan =

1950 Korean War battle

Coordinates: 39°58′20″N 125°48′12″E

- Part of the Korean War
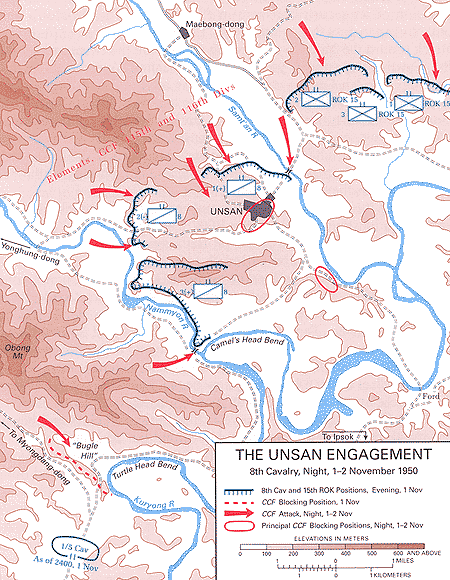
- Map of Battle of Unsan on the night of 1 – 2 November 1950
Date	25 October – 4 November 1950
Location	Unsan, North Korea
Result	Chinese and North Korean victory, retreat of UN forces.

Belligerents
China	United Nations: United States; South Korea

Commanders and leaders
(China) Peng Dehuai (China) Wu Xinquan (China) Wen Yucheng	(United States) Frank W. Milburn (United States) Hobart R. Gay (United States) Raymond D. Palmer (First Republic of Korea) Paik Sun Yup

Units involved
(China) 39th Corps (Note: In Chinese military nomenclature, the term "Army" (军) means Corps, while the term "Army Group" (集团军) means Army.); 115th Division; 116th Division; 117th Division; (China) 40th Corps; 120th Division	(United States) 1st Cavalry Division; 5th Cavalry Regiment; 8th Cavalry Regiment; (South Korea) 1st Infantry Division; 15th Infantry Regiment

Casualties and losses
UN estimation: 600+	(United States) 449 killed 1,149 total casualties (First Republic of Korea) 530 killed and wounded Chinese estimation: 2,000

The Battle of Unsan (Korean: 운산 전투; Hanja: 雲山戰鬪; MR: Unsan chŏnt'u), also known as the Battle of Yunshan (Chinese: 云山战斗; pinyin: Yúnshān zhàndòu), was a series of engagements of the Korean War that took place from 25 October to 4 November 1950 near Unsan, North Pyongan province in present-day North Korea. As part of the People's Republic of China's First Phase Campaign, the People's Volunteer Army (PVA) repeatedly attacked the Republic of Korea Army (ROKA) 1st Infantry Division near Unsan beginning on 25 October, to surprise the advancing United Nations Command (UNC). The United States' (US) 8th Cavalry Regiment was encircled on 1–2 November and broke out with the loss of most of its heavy equipment.

== Background ==
North Korea was in retreat by October 1950. After breaking out of the Pusan Perimeter at the south-east tip of the Korean peninsula in September, the UNC offensive pursued the Korean People's Army (KPA) through South Korea, into North Korea, and toward the Sino-Korean border. The US 1st Cavalry Division entered Pyongyang on 19 October, while the ROKA were rushing towards the Yalu River in all directions. As part of the Thanksgiving Offensive to end the war, Major general Frank W. Milburn, commander of US I Corps, ordered the ROKA 1st Infantry Division to secure the Sui-ho Dam on the Yalu River by advancing through Unsan.

In response to the rapid KPA collapse and the UNC advance toward the Chinese border, Chairman Mao Zedong ordered the People's Liberation Army's North East Frontier Force to be reorganized into the People's Volunteer Army (PVA) for the upcoming intervention in Korea. Mao was determined to prevent a North Korean capitulation, but the Chinese military was skeptical of its ability to fight more-modern US forces. Mao compromised with the First Phase Campaign, a bridgehead building operation with limited offensives against South Korean forces while avoiding US forces. Under strict secrecy, the PVA entered Korea on 19 October.

== Prelude ==
=== Locations and terrain ===
Unsan is a town in northwest Korea, and it is located 50 mi (80 km) from the Ch'ongch'on River mouth on the Korean west coast. Because of the hilly terrain at the Sino-Korean Border, Unsan is one of the few access points into the Yalu River area. The town is surrounded by hills to the north, the Nammyon River to the west and the Samtan River to the east. At the south of the town, a road junction controls the road from Unsan to Ipsok while a ridge dubbed "Bugle Hill" controls the road between Unsan and Yongsan-dong. Those two roads formed the only retreat routes for the ROKA/UN forces at Unsan.

=== Forces and strategy ===
Acting on Milburn's instruction, the ROKA 1st Infantry Division advanced north on 24 October with the ROKA 6th Infantry Division on its right and the US 24th Infantry Division on its left, and by the morning of 25 October, the 1st Infantry Division had captured Unsan. But with the ROKA/UNC spread thinly across Korea, a 15 mi (24 km) gap was left between the US 24th Division and ROKA 1st Division, leaving the ROKA left flank unprotected.

Upon noticing the thinly held ROKA/UNC frontline, the Chinese decided to launch a pincer movement against the South Koreans at Unsan. As part of the First Phase Campaign, the PVA 120th Division of the 40th Corps was at first to block and hold the ROKA 1st Infantry Division at Unsan. Simultaneously, the bulk of the 40th Corps, together with the PVA 38th Corps and one division from the 42nd Corps, would attack and destroy the ROKA 6th and 8th Infantry Divisions east of Unsan. Finally, the PVA 39th Corps would destroy the 1st Infantry Division by infiltrating the gap between US 24th Division and the 1st Infantry Division west of Unsan. Undetected by UNC intelligence, the 120th Division arrived at the blocking position on 24 October, with its 360th Regiment heavily fortified the hills north of Unsan. To obscure troop movements and to prevent UNC air raids, the Chinese also started several forest fires around the end of October.

== Battle ==
=== Initial skirmish ===
On 25 October at 10:30, the 1st Infantry Division attacked north with its 12th Regiment on the western bank of Samtan River while the 15th Regiment was trying to reach the eastern bank. But when the 15th Regiment was about to cross the river, the PVA 120th Division engaged the South Koreans with heavy artillery fire. The South Koreans first believed the resistance to be the last remnants of the KPA, but the perception soon changed with the capture of the first Chinese prisoner of the war. The prisoner revealed that there were 10,000 Chinese soldiers waiting to join the fight north of Unsan.

Faced with the sudden appearance of overwhelming Chinese forces, the 1st Infantry Division tried to establish defensive positions by capturing the hills around Unsan. The South Koreans soon found themselves in a seesaw battle with the PVA 360th Regiment during the night of 25 October. The next day, the PVA 39th Corps arrived at the west of Unsan, while cutting the road between Unsan and Yongsan-dong, completely surrounding the division. Aided by airdrops, the US 6th Medium Tank Battalion and the US 10th Anti-Aircraft Artillery Group, the 1st Infantry Division reopened the road on 27 October. Several more attempts to advance north by the ROKA made little progress, and the fighting stopped by 28 October.

Despite the warnings given by Brigadier general Paik Sun Yup, commander of the 1st Infantry Division, a general feeling of optimism about the outcome of the war prevented the warnings from being taken seriously. With the fighting reached a stalemate at Unsan, General Walton Walker of the Eighth United States Army ordered the US 8th Cavalry Regiment of the US 1st Cavalry Division to resume offensives north by relieving the ROKA 12th Regiment. By the time the US 8th Cavalry Regiment reached Unsan on 29 October, the ROKA 11th Infantry Regiment, 1st Infantry Division, was also pulling out of Unsan. At the same time, the Chinese had destroyed the ROKA 6th Infantry Division on the east of Unsan. Unsan had now become a northern salient in the ROKA/UN line containing only the US 8th Cavalry Regiment and the ROKA 15th Infantry Regiment.

=== Chinese counterattack ===
Still believing that the ROKA 1st Infantry Division was tied up at Unsan, PVA Commander Peng Dehuai gave the go ahead for the 39th Corps to destroy the Unsan garrison on 1 November. The Chinese plan called for the PVA 117th Division to attack from the northeast, the 116th Division to attack from the northwest and the 115th Division to attack from the southwest. At the same time, the US 8th Cavalry Regiment had taken up positions around the town, with its 1st Battalion defending the north of Unsan by the Samtan River, while its 2nd and 3rd Battalions defended the areas west of the Unsan by the Nammyon River. The lack of UN manpower, however, created a 1 mi (1,600 m) gap between the 1st and 2nd Battalions. The ROKA 15th Infantry Regiment, on the other hand, had dug in northeast of the Unsan, across the river from the US 1st Battalion.

In the early afternoon of 1 November, a combat patrol from the US 5th Cavalry Regiment, rear guard of the 8th Cavalry Regiment, was intercepted by PVA 343rd Regiment of the 115th Division at Bugle Hill. With the trap discovered, the Chinese immediately launched their attacks at 17:00. Supported by rocket artillery, the 117th Division attacked the ROKA 15th Infantry Regiment in full force, while four Chinese battalions from the 116th Division struck the gap between the 1st and 2nd Battalions of the US 8th Cavalry Regiment. By 23:00, the heavy fighting had destroyed the 15th Infantry Regiment, while the US 1st and 2nd Battalions were running out of ammunition. As the UN forces began to buckle around Unsan, Milburn finally ordered the garrison to withdraw after learning of the destruction of the ROKA 6th Infantry Division on the right flank.

Before the withdrawal could be carried out, however, the PVA 347th Regiment of the 116th Division had already entered the town of Unsan through the gap between the American battalions. Soon afterward, several roadblocks appeared behind the US 1st and 2nd Battalions. With the attacks gaining momentum, the PVA 348th Regiment, 116th Division, advanced southward from Unsan, ambushing the UN forces at the road junction by 02:30. With all the roads blocked, the US 8th Cavalry Regiment's 1st and 2nd Battalions had to escape by infiltrating the Chinese lines in small groups, abandoning most of their vehicles and heavy weapons along the way. The surviving US and ROK soldiers reached UN lines by 2 November.

While the US 8th Cavalry Regiment's 1st and 2nd Battalions were under heavy attack, its 3rd Battalion was left alone for most of the night, but by 03:00, a company of commandos from the 116th Division managed to infiltrate the battalion command post disguised as ROKA soldiers. A surprise attack set many vehicles on fire, while causing numerous casualties among the Americans, most of whom were still sleeping. By the time the confusing fighting ended, the 3rd Battalion had been squeezed into a 200 yd (180 m) wide perimeter by the PVA 345th Regiment, 115th Division. The US 5th Cavalry Regiment made repeated attempts to rescue the 3rd Battalion by attacking the PVA 343rd Regiment at Bugle Hill, but after suffering 350 casualties, the 5th Cavalry was forced to withdraw under orders from Major general Hobart Gay, commander of the 1st Cavalry Division. The trapped 3rd Battalion endured days of constant attacks; the survivors managed to break out of the perimeter by 4 November. By the end of the battle, less than 200 men of the 3rd Battalion managed to reach UN lines.

== Aftermath ==
Immediately after the success at Unsan, the rest of the Chinese forces advanced across the US lines, intending to push the US forces back across the Ch'ongch'on River and into Pyongyang. But food and ammunition shortages soon forced the Chinese to disengage on 5 November, thus ending the Chinese First Phase Campaign. Besides the victory at Unsan, the Chinese First Phase Campaign also destroyed the ROKA 6th Infantry Division and one regiment from the ROKA 8th Infantry Division at the Battle of Onjong. In return, the Chinese had suffered 10,700 casualties by the end of the Chinese First Phase Campaign. The Battle of Unsan has been considered to be one of the most devastating US losses of the Korean War.

The Chinese victory at Unsan was as much of a surprise to the Chinese leadership as it was to the UN forces. The accidental encounter between the Chinese and US forces at Unsan eased the fear of the Chinese leadership about intervening in Korea, while the performance of the 1st Cavalry Division was studied in great detail by Chinese commanders. For the UN forces, on the other hand, despite the heavy losses suffered by the US Eighth Army at Unsan, the unexpected Chinese withdrawal made the United Nations Command believe that China did not intervene in Korea on a large scale. PVA Commander Peng Dehuai incorporated the lessons from Unsan for the upcoming Second Phase Campaign, while General Douglas MacArthur launched the Home-by-Christmas Offensive under the assumption that only a weak Chinese force was present in Korea, resulting in the decisive battles at the Ch'ongch'on River and the Chosin Reservoir later that year.

== Notes ==
Footnotes

Citations
