= 199th Motorized Infantry Brigade =

Brigade of the People's Liberation Army

199th Division (1949–60) 199th Army Division (1960–85) 199th Motorized Infantry Division (1985–2003) 199th Motorized Infantry Brigade (2003–17) 199th Medium Combined Arms Brigade (2017–)
- Country: People's Republic of China
- Type: Combined Arms
- Part of: 80th Group Army
- Garrison/HQ: Zibo, Shandong
- Engagements: Chinese Civil War, Korean War, Vietnam War, Sino-Vietnam War

The 199th Medium Combined Arms Brigade, formerly the 199th Motorized Infantry Brigade, is one of the six combined arms brigades of the 80th Group Army in the Northern Theater Command Ground Force.

== Creation ==
The 199th Division (Chinese: 第199师) was created in February 1949 under the Regulation of the Redesignations of All Organizations and Units of the Army, issued by Central Military Commission on November 1, 1948, basing on the 5th Brigade, 3rd Column of Huabei Military Region Field Force. Its history can be traced to the 7th Brigade of Jicha Column formed in October 1945.

Under the command of 67th Corps, it took part in many major battles during the Chinese Civil War.

The division was composed of 595th, 596th, and 597th Regiments.

== Korean War ==
In October 1950, Artillery Regiment, 199th Division was activated in Tanggu, Tianjin, which was later redesignated as 579th Artillery Regiment in 1953.

In June 1951, the division was deployed into Korea along with its corps HQ. The division took part in the defensive operations in Kumsong area in fall 1951, during which it suffered heavy casualties.

== After Korea ==
In June 1954, the division pulled out from North Korea and redeployed in Laiwu. Shandong, where 199th Tank Self-Propelled Artillery Regiment was activated and attached to the division.

In April 1960 the division was renamed as 199th Army Division(Chinese: 陆军第199师) . By then the division was composed of:

- 595th Regiment
- 596th Regiment
- 597th Regiment
- 579th Artillery Regiment
- 199th Tank Self-Propelled Artillery Regiment

In June 1969, 579th Artillery Regiment was redesignated as Artillery Regiment, 199th Army Division.

In August 1969, 199th Tank Self-Propelled Artillery Regiment detached from the division and became the 3rd Independent Tank Regiment of Jinan Military Region, which was then attached to the 13th Tank Division in December.

From March 1985 to June 1986, the division was deployed into the Laoshan area to participate in the Sino-Vietnam War.

In June 1986, the division was reconstituted as a northern motorized infantry division, category A, and redesignated as 199th Motorized Infantry Division(Chinese: 摩托化步兵第199师):

- Tank Regiment, 67th Army Corps attached to the division as Tank Regiment, 199th Infantry Division;
- Anti-Aircraft Artillery Regiment, 67th Army Corps attached to the division as Anti-Aircraft Artillery Regiment, 199th Infantry Division.

The division maintained as a combat-ready unit in Jinan Military Region. By then the division was composed of:

- 595th Infantry Regiment
- 596th Infantry Regiment
- 597th Infantry Regiment
- Tank Regiment
- Artillery Regiment
- Anti-Aircraft Artillery Regiment

In 1998, the division was transferred to the 26th Army following 67th Army's disbandment.

- Tank Regiment, 199th Infantry Division merged with 597th Infantry Regiment to activate Armored Regiment, 199th Infantry Division.

By then the division was composed of:

- 595th Infantry Regiment
- 596th Infantry Regiment
- Armored Regiment
- Artillery Regiment
- Anti-Aircraft Artillery Regiment

In 2003 the division was reduced and reconstituted as 199th Motorized Infantry Brigade(Chinese: 摩托化步兵第199旅).

In April 2017 the brigade was reconstituted as 199th Medium Combined Arms Brigade(Chinese: 中型合成第199旅).

The brigade is now a maneuvering part of PLA 80th Group Army.
