= 94th Division (People's Republic of China) =

Former division of the People's Liberation Army of China

The 94th Division (lang-zh:第94师) was a military formation of the People's Liberation Army of the People's Republic of China.

== History ==
The 94th Division (lang-zh:第94师) was a military formation of the People's Liberation Army of the People's Republic of China. It was created on February under the Regulation of the Redesignations of All Organizations and Units of the Army, issued by Central Military Commission on November 1, 1948, basing on the 6th New-formed Division, Jiaodong Column, Huadong Military District. Its history can be traced to the Independent Regiments of the Nanhai, Beihai and Xihai Military Sub-district of the Huadong Military District. Under the command of 32nd Corps it took part in battles during the Chinese Civil War. In January 1949 the division was attached to the 31st Corps and liberated the Dongshan island with 91st Division.

In October 1950 the 32nd Corps was disbanded, and the division was transferred to the 27th Corps.

== In Korea ==
As a part of People's Volunteer Army (Chinese People's Volunteers (CPV) or Chinese Communist Forces (CCF)), the division took part in the Korean War with a standard strength of approximately 10,000 men. It was a component of the 30th Army which had each of its divisions re-allocated as reinforcements to the 20th, 26th and the 27th Armies. The 94th Division was attached to the 27th Army.

== Disbandment ==
The division was disbanded in February 1951, its personnel transferred to the other divisions of the 27th Corps as replacements.

Still, the 281st Regiment from the division converted to Special Troops Regiment, 27th Corps, then Artillery Regiment, 27th Corps.
