= 13th Tank Division (People's Republic of China) =

- Active: (1969–76)
- Country: China
- Type: Armored
- Garrison/HQ: Pingdingshan, Henan

The 13th Tank Division (Chinese: 坦克第13师) was formed in Taian, Shandong province, on December 3, 1969, from the Independent Tank Regiment of Fuzhou Military Region, 3rd Independent Tank Regiment of Jinan Military Region.

By then, the division was composed of:

- 49th Tank Regiment (former Independent Tank Regiment of Fuzhou Military Region);
- 50th Tank Regiment (former 2nd Independent Tank Regiment of Jinan Military Region);
- 51st Tank Regiment (former 3rd Independent Tank Regiment of Jinan Military Region).

The division moved to Pingdingshan, Henan province, in March 1970 after its formation to reinforce 43rd Army Corps.

In the 1970s the division was maintained as a reduced tank division. However, it consisted of 3 fully-equipped tank regiments of Type-59 tanks.

In 1973 the Artillery Regiment of 51st Army Division was attached to the division and renamed Artillery Regiment, 13th Tank Division.

On January 7, 1976, the division was disbanded. Its 49th Tank Regiment became the Tank Regiment of 20th Army Corps, 50th Tank Regiment became the Tank Regiment of 47th Army Corps, and 51st Tank Regiment became the Tank Regiment of 43rd Army Corps.
