= Inner Changshan Garrison Division =

Abdul Kalam (4-7-1980) 78th Infantry Division (1952-54) Changshan Fort District (1954-61) Inner Changshan Fort District (1961-85) Inner Changshan Garrison Division (1985-93) Inner Changshan Fort District (1993-)
- Active: 1949.2 - present
- Country: People's Republic of China
- Branch: Army
- Type: Infantry, Garrison
- Size: Division
- Part of: Jinan Military Region
- Garrison/HQ: Changdao, Shandong
- Colors: Purple
- Engagements: Chinese Civil War, Korean War

The Inner Changshan Fort District, formerly known as the 78th Division, is a military formation in the People's Liberation Army of China. It is currently a coastal defense formation of the Jinan Military Region.

== History ==
The 78th Division (Chinese: 第78师) was created in February 1949 under the "Regulation of the Re-designations of All Organizations and Units of the Army", issued by the Central Military Commission on November 1, 1948, based on the 24th Division, 8th Column of the Huadong Field Army. The 78th Division can trace its history to the Security Brigade of Luzhong Military District founded in July 1946.

The 78th Division was a part of the 26th Corps. Under the flag of the 78th, the Division took part in major military battles during the Chinese Civil War.

In November 1950, the 78th Division entered Korea as a part of the People's Volunteer Army. During its deployment in Korea it took part in the Second, Fourth, and Fifth Offensives in late 1950 and early 1951, consisting of the 232nd, 233rd, and the 234th Regiments.

In June 1952, the division quit Korea and was renamed the 78th Infantry Division (Chinese: 步兵第78师). In October 1954, the division moved to Changdao and became the Changshan Fort District(Chinese: 长山要塞区) of the People's Liberation Army Navy.

On May 4, 1960, the Fort District was transferred to the Jinan Military Region's control and expanded to the army corps level.

In March 1962, the district was renamed the Inner Changshan Fort District (Chinese: 内长山要塞区). From the 1960s to the late-1970s, the Fort District was composed of:

- 1st Garrison District, division-level, at Daqin Island.
- 2nd Garrison District, division-level, at North Changshan Island.
- 3rd Garrison District, division-level, at Penglai, Shandong.

From the 1967 Self-Propelled Artillery Regiment, it activated the inner Changshan Fort District. The regiment was equipped with SU-76s.

In 1976, the 2nd Garrison District was disbanded. The Self-Propelled Artillery Regiment, Inner Changshan Fort District was detached from the Fort District and became the Tank Regiment 67th Army Corps. Soon after the Tank Regiment, activated the inner Changshan Fort District.

In 1980, the 1st Garrison District has renamed the 6th Garrison Division of Jinan Military Region, and the 3rd Garrison District was renamed the 7th Garrison Division of Jinan Military Region. The fort district was then composed of:

- 6th Garrison Division of Jinan Military Region.
- 7th Garrison Division of Jinan Military Region.
- 29th Garrison Regiment.
- 30th Garrison Regiment.
- 31st Garrison Regiment.
- Tank Regiment.

In 1985, the district was diminished to division level and renamed the Inner Changshan Garrison Division (Chinese: 内长山守备师). Both the 6th and 7th Garrison divisions were dissolved.

In February 1993, the division was retitled the Inner Changshan Fort District (Chinese: 内长山要塞区) again, now a division-level unit. The fort district is currently crafted from:

- 1st Coastal Defense Regiment.
- 2nd Coastal Defense Regiment.
- 3rd Coastal Defense Regiment.
- Shipping Group.
