= 116th Mechanized Infantry Division =

116th Division (1948-52) 116th Infantry Division (1952-60) 116th Army Division (1960-85) 116th Mechanized Infantry Division (1985-)
- Active: 1948–present
- Country: China
- Branch: People's Liberation Army Ground Force
- Type: Mechanized Infantry
- Size: 10,000+
- Part of: 39th Army
- Garrison/HQ: Shenyang Military Region
- Engagements: Chinese Civil War; Korean War; Battle of Unsan; Battle of Outpost Kelly

The 116th Division was a military formation of the People's Volunteer Army (Chinese People's Volunteers (CPV) during the Korean War, with a standard strength of approximately 10,000 men.

== History ==
The 116th Division was part of the 39th Army, consisting of the 346th, 347th, and 348th Regiments.

=== Korean War ===
The 116th Division was one of the first Chinese divisions to attack the UN forces at Unsan, where it inflicted heavy casualties on the 8th Cavalry Regiment. Stephen Gammons from the United States Army Center of Military History said this: The enemy [Chinese] force that brought tragedy to the 8th Cavalry at Unsan was the CCF’s 116th Division. Elements of the 116th’s 347th Regiment were responsible for the roadblock south of Unsan. Also engaged in the Unsan action was the 115th Division.

== Current ==
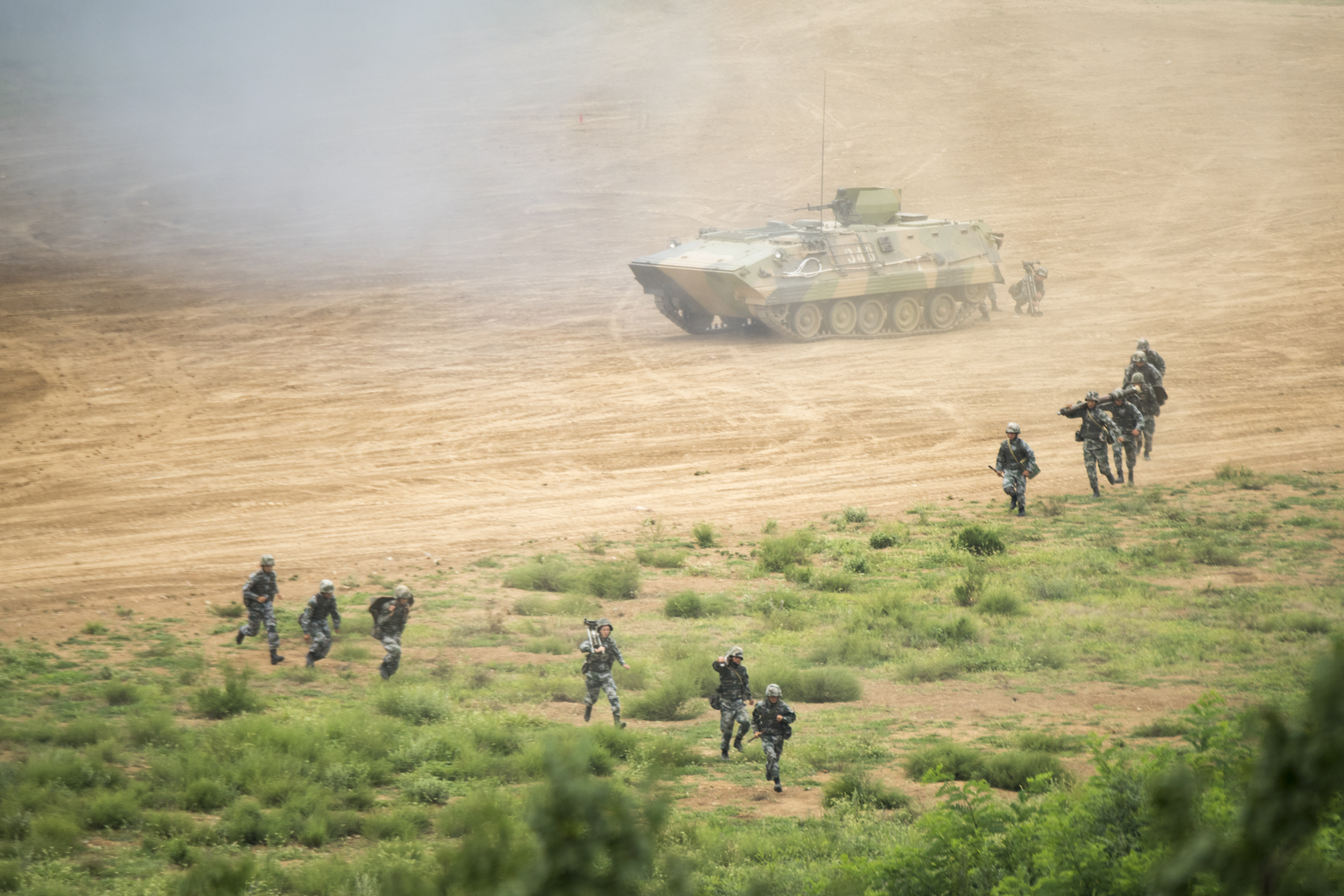
Military training performed by the 116th Mechanized Infantry during Joseph Dunford's visit to China, August 2017

The formation remains active with the 39th Group Army in the Northern Theater Command, as the 116th Mechanised Infantry Division.

The division was involved with the rest of the 39th Army in the Tiananmen Square protests of 1989. On the evening of 3 June, Xu Feng, the division commander, switched to plain clothes and carried out his reconnaissance of the city. When he returned, he told subordinates "not to look for him" and entered the division's communications vehicle. Thereafter, the division maintained radio silence and did not advance on Beijing, except for the 347th Regiment under Ai Husheng, which complied with orders and went to Tiananmen Square on 4 June. On 5 June, the rest of the division was escorted by other units to the square. Xu Feng was later disciplined for passive resistance.

== See also ==
- People's Liberation Army at Tiananmen Square protests of 1989
