= 79th Group Army =

Chinese military unit

- 第七十九集团军
- Active: 1948–present
- Country: China
- Allegiance: Chinese Communist Party
- Branch: People's Liberation Army Ground Force
- Type: Group army
- Part of: Northern Theater Command Ground Force
- Garrison/HQ: Liaoyang, Liaoning
- Engagements: Long March; World War II; Chinese Civil War; Liaoshen Campaign; Pingjin campaign; Korean War; Battle of Unsan

Commanders
- Notable commanders: Xu Haidong; Xu Qiling; Yu Yonghong

Insignia
- NATO Map Symbol

The 79th Group Army (Chinese: 第七十九集团军; pinyin: Dì Qīshíjiǔ Jítuánjūn), Unit 31671, formerly the 39th Group Army (第三十九集团军), is a military formation of the Chinese People's Liberation Army Ground Force (PLAGF). The 79th Group Army is one of thirteen total group armies of the PLAGF, the largest echelon of ground forces in the People's Republic of China, and one of three assigned to the nation's Northern Theater Command.

== History ==
The 79th Group Army can trace its lineage to the Chinese Red Army's 15th Legion. It was involved in the Chinese Civil War, most notably the Liaoshen campaign and Pingjin campaign.

In 1949 the 15th Legion was renamed to the 39th Army Corps(Chinese: 陆军第39军)

The army corps was a military formation of the People's Volunteer Army (People's Volunteer Army (PVA) during the Korean War). It comprised the 115th, 116th, and 117th Divisions.

The 39th Army Corps was deployed to the Korean War in 1950.

After the ceasefire, it was placed under the command of the Shenyang Military Region and was stationed in the Liaodong Peninsula.

In 1985, it was re-organized into the 39th Group Army.

In 2016, it was reassigned to the Northern Theater Command Ground Force, and in April 2017 it was renamed to the 79th Group Army

== Organization ==
In 2023, the 79th Group Army was composed of:

- 4 armored brigades
- 1 mechanized infantry brigade
- 1 infantry brigade
- 79th Special Forces Brigade "Amur Tigers" (东北虎)
- 1 artillery brigade
- 1 engineering brigade
- 1 Chemical defense brigade
- 1 helicopter brigade
- 1 air defense brigade
- 1 Service support brigade

== Awards ==
In the 2013 "Blade Sharpening" (砺刃—2013) military competition, which was the first ever PLASOF inter-unit competition, the 79th Special Forces Brigade won first place.

== Leadership ==
=== Historical Commanders ===
- Xu Qiling (? - December 2018)

=== Historical Political Commissars ===
- Yu Yonghong

== Sources ==
- The International Institute for Strategic Studies (2024). The Military Balance 2024. Routledge. ISBN 978-1-032-78004-7.
