= 30th Army (People's Republic of China) =

The 30th Army was a military formation of the People's Liberation Army, active from February 1949 to early 1950.

After formation in 1949, the 30th Army initially comprised the 88th, 89th and 90th Divisions.

The 30th Army consisted of the 88th, 89th, 94th Divisions. It appears that the 30th Army did not fight in the Korean War as a unit though, as its Divisions were assigned to augment the 20th, 26th, and 27th Armies.

The army was disestablished seemingly on January 30, 1950.
