= 201st Division (People's Republic of China) =

210th Division (1949) 201st Division (1949–53) 201st Infantry Division (1953–60) 201st Army Division (1960-85)
- Active: 1949.2 - 1985.9
- Country: People's Republic of China
- Branch: People's Liberation Army Ground Force
- Type: Infantry
- Size: Division
- Part of: 67th Army Corps
- Engagements: Korean War

The 210th Division (Chinese: 第210师) was created in April 1949 from security regiments in eastern Hebei area.

The division was composed of 628th, 629th, and 630th Regiments.

In August 1949, the division attached to 67th Corps and redesignated as the 201st Division (Chinese: 第201师). All its regiments were redesignated:

- 628th Regiment was redesignated as the 601st Regiment;
- 629th Regiment was redesignated as the 602nd Regiment;
- 630th Regiment was redesignated as the 603rd Regiment;

In June 1951, Artillery Regiment, 201st Division was activated, which was later renamed as 581st Artillery Regiment in 1953.

In June 1951, 201st Division moved into Korean Peninsula along with the Corps HQ. It was engaged in defensive operations against UN Forces in summer-fall 1951, during which it suffered heavy casualties.

In September 1954 the division pulled out from North Korea.

In April 1960 the division was renamed as 201st Army Division(Chinese: 陆军第201师). By then the division was composed of:

- 601st Regiment
- 602nd Regiment
- 603rd Regiment
- 581st Artillery Regiment

In December 1968, the division was transferred under 68th Army Corps ' control.

In August 1969, 581st Artillery Regiment was renamed as Artillery Regiment, 201st Army Division.

In April 1970, the division returned to 67th Army Corps' control.

In September 1985 the division was disbanded. 602nd Infantry Regiment was transferred to the 200th Infantry Division.
