= 5th Aviation Division =

Chinese military unit

The 5th Aviation Division (People's Republic of China) (中国人民解放军空军航空兵第五师, Unit 94590) is the first attack aircraft division of the People's Liberation Army Air Force, and a unit of the Central Military Commission's strategic reserve, founded on December 5, 1950.

Established on December 5, 1950, at Kaiyuan, Liaoning Province, it was part of the Jinan Military Region Air Force. The division was based in Weifang, Shandong. It consists of the 13th Air Regiment (located in Weifang); 14 Air Regiment (based in Ming, composed of Xi'an JH-7 and the Nanchang Q-5, at Xinyang Minggang Airport); and the 15th Air Regiment (in Weifang). The division has participated in the National Day military parade, the Sino-Vietnamese War, the round to Yunnan, hydrogen bomb tests, and the test flight on the Tibetan plateau.

== History ==
In accordance with the Central Military Commission's approval (telegraphed on November 19, 1950), the PLA Air Force commanded the establishment of the 5th Aviation Division on November 25, 1950. The 5th Aviation Division would consist of the 13th and 15th Air Regiments, formerly the 13th Air Regiment and the 15th Supply Squadron, which had both been under the 617th Group of the 206th Independent Infantry Division. The 13th Air Regiment had been formed on August 1, 1950, as part of the 617th Group of the 206th Independent Infantry Division when it received 35 top students from the 1st and 3rd aviation academies. Its equipment started with Ilyushin Il-10 planes left in Xuzhou after the withdrawal of the Soviet Volunteer Group. It became the PLA Air Force's first unit of attack aircraft, and on November 25, 1950, it moved from Xuzhou to Kaiyuan. The first division commander was Ma Yong, and the first political commissar was Ma Zeying.

On January 2, 1951, the Fifth Air Division began flight training. On March 5 of that year it received equipment from a Soviet air division stationed in Kaiyuan, including 60 Il-10 attack aircraft, 4 UIL-10 trainer aircraft and 3 communication aircraft. On May 23, 1951, the Air Force participated in the joint arms exercise for the first time. The Fifth Air Division dispatched 4 attack aircraft to participate in the joint arms exercise organized by the General Staff Training Department in the area from Changxindian to Lugou Bridge in Beijing. On October 1, 1951, the Fifth Air Division participated in the National Day parade for the first time, dispatching 36 Il-10 aircraft to participate in the parade in four nine-aircraft "品"-shaped formations. The division headquarters was transferred to Yongji, Jilin in April 1953, and then to Fuxian, Liaoning in December 1955. On July 31, 1964, the organization system of the troops was adjusted. Some personnel from the original 13th and 15th Air Regiments were transferred to form the 15th Air Force Squadron in Fu County, Liaoning; the original 15th Air Regiment was changed to the 14th Air Squadron, and the original 13th Air Regiment was changed to the 13th Air Squadron. On June 30, 1969, according to the instructions of the Air Force Command on May 31, 1969, the 5th Air Division and the 22nd Air Division exchanged defenses and were incorporated into the Air Force of the Jinan Military Region. From July 6 to 20, 1969, the headquarters of the 5th Air Division led the 13th and 15th Squadrons to move from Wafangdian and Sanshilibao Airport to Weixian, and the 14th Squadron moved to Gaomi Airport. In May 1970, the 13th, 14th, and 15th Air Squadrons were renamed the 13th, 14th, and 15th Air Force Regiments of the Air Force respectively.

In November 1967, Song Zhanyuan, then commander of the Fifth Air Division, was ordered to go to Beijing and accepted the Air Force's order to organize a test mission of using research aircraft to drop a small hydrogen bomb. In December 1969, the first batch of Q- 5 aircraft began to be equipped with the Fifth Air Division. On December 9, 1971, the Central Military Commission dispatched four Q-5A aircraft from the Fifth Air Division, which arrived in Malan, Xinjiang on December 12 to carry out the hydrogen bomb airdrop test mission. On December 30, 1971, Yang Guoxiang, then commander of the 14th Regiment of the Fifth Air Division, took off with the bomb. Due to a short circuit in the bomb drop device circuit, he failed to drop the bomb three times. Then, under the command and guidance of the tower commander and Fifth Air Division commander Song Zhanyuan, he landed successfully with the bomb at the risk of his life. On January 7, 1972, Yang Guoxiang took off for the second time and successfully dropped the hydrogen bomb, announcing the successful completion of the five-year self-developed airborne small hydrogen bomb test.

In February 1986, the 14th Air Force Regiment was transferred from Gaomi to Minggang, Henan. On June 11, 1994, eight Q-5 aircraft from the 1st Squadron of the 13th Air Force Regiment participated in the night training reform demonstration of the whole army, setting four records: night live-fire bombing and rocket attack by the Air Force attack aircraft unit, night formation combat, assault on ground targets under complex weather conditions at night, and coordinated combat with ground forces without night vision equipment. On October 1, 1999, the 5th Air Force Division participated in the 50th anniversary of the National Day air parade. Since 2008, the 5th Air Force Division has been equipped with the JH-7 fighter-bomber.

The 5th Attack Division was still listed by the IISS Military Balance in 2014 with two regiments, one of Q-5E and one of JH-7A.

Around May 2017, the 15th Air Regiment (serials 11x6x) was reorganized as the 15th Aviation Brigade.
