= 148th Division (People's Republic of China) =

People's Liberation Army division (1949–1985)

148th Division (1949–60) 148th Army Division (1960–85)
- Active: 1949.2 - 1985
- Country: People's Republic of China
- Branch: People's Liberation Army, People's Volunteer Army
- Type: Division
- Role: Infantry
- Part of: 50th Corps
- Garrison/HQ: Baitou, Sichuan province (1967–1985)
- Engagements: Chinese Civil War, Korean War, Vietnam War, Sino-Vietnamese War

The 148th Division was a military formation of the People's Liberation Army of the People's Republic of China.

The division was converted from the 182nd Division, 60th Corps of the Republic of China Army defected during Liaoshen Campaign. In January 1949 it renamed 148th Division, PLA 50th Corps according to the Regulation of the Redesignations of All Organizations and Units of the Army, issued by Central Military Commission on November 1, 1948.

Under the flag of 148th division it took part in the Chinese Civil War.

In October 26, 1950, the division entered Korea with the Corps HQ as a part of the People's Volunteer Army (Chinese People's Volunteers (CPV) or Chinese Communist Forces (CCF)) with a standard strength of approximately 10,000 men. The division consisted of the 442nd, 443rd, and 444th Regiments.

During the Fourth Campaign of Korean War, the division, with the Corps, persisted on the battlefields along the Han River near Seoul for 50 days and inflicted heavy losses on the United Nations. In March 1951 it pulled out from Korea for R&R. By July the division entered Korea for the second time.

In April 1955 the 148th Division pulled out from Korea and stationed in Shenyang Military Region.

In 1960 it renamed 148th Army Division (陆军第148师).

In May 1967 the division moved to Baitou, Sichuan province with the Corps HQ, converting to a "southern" unit.

The division is not affected during the re-designation during December 1969.

In February 1979 it took part in the Sino-Vietnamese conflict.

In 1985, the division was disbanded with Corps HQ.
