= 4th Aviation Division =

Aviation Division of the Chinese People's Liberation Army Air Force

The 4th Aviation Division is a formation of the Chinese People's Liberation Army Air Force (PLAAF). Initially established in 1950, it served in Korea under Commander Fang Ziyi and Commissar Ye Songsheng, flying Mikoyan-Gurevich MiG-15s. It ended its third combat tour in July 1953. It was soon redesignated the 1st Fighter Division.

The division was reestablished in 1956. It was headquartered this time at Liaoyang, Liaoning Province, in the Shenyang Military Region. The 4th Fighter Division was believed to be equipped with the Chengdu J-7E fighter aircraft. The 4th Fighter Division comprised the 10th Regiment and the 12th Regiment.

In 2003 the division was disbanded. Its 10th Aviation Regiment was transferred to the 30th Aviation Division as the 89th Regiment. The 4th Division was re-established, for the second time, as a transport formation at Qionglai Air Base the next year, in 2004.

As of 2017 the transport unit flew the Xian Y-7 transporter and the Xi'an Y-20 strategic airlifter under the Division's 12th Transport Regiment.
