= 202nd Division (People's Republic of China) =

202nd Division (1949–53) 202nd Infantry Division (1953–60) 202nd Army Division (1960-85)
- Active: 1949.2 - 1985.9
- Country: People's Republic of China
- Branch: People's Liberation Army Ground Force
- Type: Infantry
- Size: Division
- Part of: 68th Army Corps
- Garrison/HQ: Jilin City, Jilin
- Engagements: Chinese Civil War, Korean War

The 202nd Division (Chinese: 第202师) was created in January 1949 under the Regulation of the Redesignations of All Organizations and Units of the Army, issued by Central Military Commission on November 1, 1948, basing on the 16th Brigade, 6th Column of the Huabei Military Region Field Force. Its history can be traced to the 7th Independent Brigade, Jizhong Military District, formed in July 1946.

The division was part of the 68th Corps. Under the flag of the 202nd Division, it was engaged in the Chinese Civil War, including the Pingjin Campaign, and Taiyuan Campaign.

In March 1951, Artillery Regiment, 202nd Division was activated, which was later renamed as 582nd Artillery Regiment in 1953.

In June 1951, 202nd Division moved into Korean Peninsula along with the Corps HQ. It was engaged in defensive operations against UN Forces in summer-fall 1951, during which it suffered heavy casualties. In 1953, the division participated in the Battle of Kumsong against the US and ROK forces.

In August 1954, 202nd Tank Self-Propelled Artillery Regiment was activated.

In March 1955 the division pulled out from North Korea and redeployed in Xuzhou, Jiangsu province.

In April 1960 the division was renamed as 202nd Army Division(Chinese: 陆军第202师). By then the division was composed of:

- 604th Regiment
- 605th Regiment
- 606th Regiment
- 582nd Artillery Regiment
- 202nd Tank Self-Propelled Artillery Regiment

In June 1967, 202nd Tank Self-Propelled Artillery Regiment detached from the division and was renamed as 4th Independent Tank Regiment of Jinan Military Region.

In August 1969, 582nd Artillery Regiment was renamed as Artillery Regiment, 202nd Army Division.

In May 1976, the division moved to Jilin City, Jilin Province along with the corps.

In September 1985 the division was inactivated and merged into 12th Garrison Division of Shenyang Military Region of the Chifeng Garrison District
