= 60th Motorized Infantry Brigade =

Brigade of the People's Liberation Army

60th Division (1949-60) 60th Army Division (1960-85) 60th Infantry Division (1985-98) 60th Motorized Infantry Brigade (1998-2017) 60th Medium Combined Arms Brigade (2017-)
- Active: 1949 - present
- Country: People's Republic of China
- Type: Combined Arms
- Part of: 83rd Group Army
- Garrison/HQ: Minggang, Xinyang, Henan

The 60th Medium Combined Arms Brigade is one of the six combined arms brigades of the 83rd Group Army under the Central Theater Command. The 60th was converted from a division to a brigade as part of the PLA modernization efforts of the late 1990s.

The predecessor 60th Division(Chinese: 第60师) was created in 1949 as part of the 20th Corps. It consisted of the 178th, 179th, and 180th Regiments. It entered Korea along with the rest of the 20th Corps as part of the People's Volunteer Army (Chinese People's Volunteers (CPV) or Chinese Communist Forces (CCF)) in September 1950. Artillery Regiment, 60th Division was activated at the same time.

The 60th Division moved toward a blocking position near Koto-ri, south of "Hell-Fire Valley" during the Battle of Chosin Reservoir.

The division withdrew from Korea in October 1952 and garrisoned in Shanghai. In December, the division moved to Huangyan-Haimen area in Zhejiang for coastal security missions.

In March 1953, the division was reorganized:

- The 265th Tank Self-Propelled Artillery Regiment was activated and attached to the division;
- Artillery Regiment, 60th Division was redesignated as the 340th Artillery Regiment;
- The 180th Regiment detached the division and reconstituted as the Artillery Training Battalion, 20th Corps;
- The Special Troops Regiment, 20th Corps attached to the division and reconstituted as the new 180th Regiment.

In September 1956, 265th Tank Self-Propelled Artillery Regiment detached from the division.

In April 1960, the division was redesignated as the 60th Army Division(Chinese: 陆军第60师). By then the division was composed of:

- 178th Regiment
- 179th Regiment
- 180th Regiment
- 340th Artillery Regiment

In June 1969, the 340th Artillery Regiment was redesignated as the Artillery Regiment, 60th Army Division.

In May 1975, the division moved to Minggang, Xinyang, Henan along with the Army Corps headquarters.

In September 1985, the division was renamed as the 60th Infantry Division(Chinese: 步兵第60师) and maintained as a northern infantry division, category B.

- The 180th Regiment was disbanded;
- The 175th Regiment from the disbanding 59th Army Division was attached to the division.

In September 1998, the division was reduced and reorganized into the 60th Motorized Infantry Brigade(Chinese: 摩托化步兵第60旅).

In April 2017, the brigade was reorganized into the 60th Medium Combined Arms Brigade(Chinese: 中型合成第60旅).
