= 120th Armed Police Division =

Former People's Liberation Army unit

The 120th Armed Police Division was a division in the People's Armed Police.

== History ==
The 120th Division was a military formation of the Chinese People's Liberation Army as part of the Chinese People's Volunteers (CPV) during the Korean War. It had a standard strength of approximately 10,000 men. It was a component of the 40th Army, and consisted of the 358th, 359th, and 360th Regiments.

In 1996 it was renamed to the 120th Armed Police Division, also called Unit 8620 and was headquartered in Xingcheng, Huludao. It consisted of the 355th Armed Police Regiment stationed in Chaoying, 359th Armed Police Regiment stationed in Xingcheng, Huludao, the 360th Armed Police Regiment stationed in Chifeng 701st Armed Police Regiment stationed in Xingcheng, Huludao.

In 2017 the division was merged into the 1st Mobile Contingent.
