= 194th Motorized Infantry Brigade =

Brigade of the People's Liberation Army

194th Division (1949–53) 194th Infantry Division (1953–60) 194th Army Division (1960-85) 194th Infantry Division (1985–98) 194th Motorized Infantry Brigade (1998-2003)
- Active: 1949.2 - 2003
- Country: People's Republic of China
- Branch: People's Liberation Army
- Type: Motorized Infantry
- Size: Brigade
- Part of: 65th Army
- Engagements: Chinese Civil War, Korean War

The 194th Division (Chinese: 第194师) was created in February 1949 under the Regulation of the Redesignations of All Organizations and Units of the Army, issued by Central Military Commission on November 1, 1948, basing on the 23rd Brigade, 8th Column, 2nd Army Group of Huabei Military Region. Its history could be traced to 15th Military Sub-district, Jireliao Military District of Jinchaji Military Region formed in November 1944.

The division was composed of 580th, 581st and 582nd Infantry Regiments. As a part of 65th Corps the division took part in major battles during the Chinese Civil War, including the Pingjin Campaign, Taiyuan Campaign, Lanzhou Campaign and Ningxia Campaign.

In December 1950, Artillery Regiment, 194th Division was activated. Since 1952 the regiment was renamed as 574th Artillery Regiment. In 1952 the division was renamed as the 194th Infantry Division (Chinese: 步兵第194师).

In February 1951 the division entered Korea as a part of People's Volunteer Army. During its deployment in Korea the division took part in the Fifth Phase Offensive and several major battles, during which it allegedly inflicted 9482 casualties to confronting UN Forces. In October 1953 the division pulled out from Korea. By then the division was composed of:

- 580th Infantry Regiment;
- 581st Infantry Regiment;
- 582nd Infantry Regiment;
- 574th Artillery Regiment.

In April 1960 the division was renamed as the 194th Army Division (Chinese: 陆军第194师).

In December 1969, 574th Artillery Regiment was renamed as Artillery Regiment, 194th Army Division.

In 1985, the division was renamed as the 194th Infantry Division (Chinese: 步兵第194师) again, and reorganized as a northern infantry division, catalogue B.

From 1985 to 1998 the division was composed of:

- 580th Infantry Regiment;
- 581st Infantry Regiment;
- 582nd Infantry Regiment;
- Artillery Regiment.

In 1998 the division was reduced and renamed as the 194th Motorized Infantry Brigade (Chinese: 摩托化步兵第194旅).

In 2003 the brigade was disbanded.

The brigade is not related to the 194th Mechanized Infantry Brigade, now the 194th Heavy Combined Arms Brigade, a unit split from 193rd Infantry Division in 2011.
