= 59th Division (People's Republic of China) =

Former division of the People's Liberation Army of China

The 59th Division was a military formation of the People's Liberation Army, which was created in February 1949 under the Regulation of the Redesignations of All Organizations and Units of the Army, issued by the Central Military Commission on November 1, 1948, basing on the 2nd Division, 1st Column of Huadonng Field Army. Its origin can be traced back to the Jiangnan anti-Japanese volunteers' Army (Chinese: 江南抗日义勇军) formed in May 1939. Under the command of PLA 20th Corps it took part in the Chinese Civil War.

The division joined the flag of People's Volunteer Army (Chinese People's Volunteers (CPV) or Chinese Communist Forces (CCF)) during the Korean War. It was still a component of the 20th Corps, consisting of the 175th, 176th, and 177th Regiments.

The 59th Division attacked Fox Company, 7th Marines north of Sinhung-ni at Toktong Pass during the Battle of Chosin Reservoir. Underestimating U.S air and artillery power, the 59th Division experienced over 1,000 killed in its attempt to dislodge Fox Company from its position, while inflicting 182 casualties.

In October 1952 it pulled back to China with the 20th Corps and stationed in Zhejiang province.

In 1953 the 264th Tank Self-Propelled Artillery Regiment attached to the Division. By then the division was composed of:

- 175th Regiment
- 176th Regiment
- 177th Regiment
- 264th Tank Self-Propelled Artillery Regiment
- Artillery Regiment

In 1955 it renamed as 59th Infantry Division (Chinese: 步兵第59师).

In 1958 it moved to Kaifeng, Henan province with the Corps HQ. The 264th Tank Self-Propelled Artillery Regiment was detached from the division in the same year.

In 1960 it renamed as 59th Army Division (Chinese: 陆军第59师).

In the 1960s it maintained as a middle division, Northern unit, which was fully equipped but not 100% manned.

In 1975 the division moved to Henan Province with the Corps HQ to replace 1st Corps. Since then the division is stationed in Shangqiu, Henan Province.

The unit was disbanded in 1985. The Division HQ was reflagged as HQ Antiaircraft Artillery Brigade, 20th Army. Its 175th Regiment was transferred to 60th division.
