= 52nd Engineer Division =

41st Engineer Brigade (1985–present) 52nd Engineer Construction Division (1964–1985) 102nd Engineer District Command (1960–1961) 195th Army Division (1960) 195th Infantry Division (1953–1960) 195th Division (1949–1953)
- Active: February 1949; 77 years ago – present
- Country: People's Republic of China
- Branch: People's Liberation Army
- Type: Brigade
- Role: Engineer
- Part of: People's Liberation Army General Staff Department
- Garrison/HQ: Changping, Beijing
- Engagements: Chinese Civil War, Korean War

195th Division, later 52nd Engineer Construction Division and 41st Engineer Brigade is a construction formation of the People's Liberation Army of the People's Republic of China. During the 1960s to 1970s, it took part in two major top-secret construction projects of underground command complex for the Central Military Commission of the Chinese Communist Party.

== 195th Infantry Division ==
The 195th Division (Chinese: 第195师) was created in February 1949 under the Regulation of the Redesignations of All Organizations and Units of the Army, issued by Central Military Commission on November 1, 1948, basing on the 24th Brigade, 8th Column, 2nd Army Group of Huabei Military Region. Its history could be traced to 2nd Independent Brigade, 2nd Army Group of Huabei Military Region formed in September 1948.

The division was composed of 583rd, 584th and 585th Infantry Regiments. As a part of 65th Corps the division took part in major battles during the Chinese Civil War, including the Pingjin Campaign, Taiyuan Campaign, Lanzhou Campaign and Ningxia Campaign.

In December 1950, Artillery Regiment, 195th Division was activated. Since 1952 the regiment was renamed as 575th Artillery Regiment. In 1952 the division was renamed as 195th Infantry Division (Chinese: 步兵第195师).

In February 1951 the division entered Korea as a part of People's Volunteer Army. By April it formed part of the 65th Army within the 19th Army Group. During its deployment in Korea the division took part in the Fifth Phase Offensive and several battles. In October 1953 the division pulled out from Korea. By then the division was composed of:

- 583rd Infantry Regiment;
- 584th Infantry Regiment;
- 585th Infantry Regiment;
- 575th Artillery Regiment.

In April 1960 the division was renamed as 195th Army Division (Chinese: 陆军第195师).

== 52nd Construction Engineer Division ==
In October 1960, 195th Army Division, except its 575th Artillery Regiment, were transferred to Engineer Troops and reorganized as 102nd Engineer District Command(Chinese: 第102工区指挥部). All three regiments remained their designation.

In March 1961 the district command moved to Huailai, Hebei. From 1961 to early 1970's the division was in charge of the construction of National Defense Project 102, a top-secret underground command complex near Guanting Reservoir.

In June 1961 the district command was reorganized as 52nd Engineer Construction Division(Chinese: 工程兵建筑第52师). All its three regiments were renamed as follow:

- 108th Engineer Regiment (former 583rd);
- 110th Engineer Regiment (former 584th);
- 118th Engineer Regiment (former 585th).

In 1970 the division moved to Fang County, Hubei for the construction of Project 123 Kuang, another top-secret underground command complex near Shennongjia area. After the completion of the program, the division garrisoned in Xiangfan, Hubei.

In 1982, after the disbandment of 51st Engineer Division, 104th and 115th Engineer Regiments were attached to 52nd Engineer Division.

== 41st Engineer Brigade ==
In 1985 the division was reduced and reorganized as 41st Engineer Brigade(Chinese: 工兵第41旅). The brigade is composed of 4 construction battalions and 1 engineer battalion. The brigade is now stationing in Nankou area, Changping, Beijing.
