= 89th Division (2nd Formation) (People's Republic of China) =

89th Division
- Active: 1950.7-1951.2
- Country: People's Republic of China
- Branch: Army
- Type: Infantry
- Part of: 26th Corps
- Engagements: Korean War

The 89th Division (Chinese: 第89师) (2nd formation) was a military formation of the People's Liberation Army.

After the 89th Division (1st Formation) re-organized into 1st Air Desant Brigade, in July 1950, 89th Division was re-activated.

In October 1950, the division entered Korea as a part on People's Volunteer Army. It was a component of the 26th Corps, composed of the 265th, 266th, and 267th Regiments.

Two PLA divisions, the 89th and 79th, attacked the 5th Marine Regiment west of the Chosin Reservoir in the Yudam-ni area. The marines killed the Chinese by the hundreds but were in danger of being cut off from the division headquarters at Hagaru-ri, at the southern end of the reservoir.

The division suffered heavy casualties during the Battle of Chosin Reservoir. After that it was pulled back from the front and disbanded in February 1951. The 89th Division's last fate was to be assigned as a reinforcing division to the 20th Corps.
