= 204th Division (People's Republic of China) =

204th Division (1949–53) 204th Infantry Division (1953–60) 204th Army Division (1960-85)
- Active: 1949.2 - 1985.9
- Country: People's Republic of China
- Branch: People's Liberation Army Ground Force
- Type: Infantry
- Size: Division
- Part of: 68th Army Corps
- Garrison/HQ: Yanji, Jilin
- Engagements: Chinese Civil War, Korean War

The 204th Division (Chinese: 第204师) was created in January 1949 under the Regulation of the Redesignations of All Organizations and Units of the Army, issued by Central Military Commission on November 1, 1948, basing on the 18th Brigade, 6th Column of the Huabei Military Region Field Force, which was activated in November 1947.

The division was a part of the 68th Corps. Under the flag of the 204th Division, it was engaged in the Chinese Civil War, including the Pingjin Campaign, and Taiyuan Campaign.

In March 1951, Artillery Regiment, 204th Division was activated, which was later renamed as 584th Artillery Regiment in 1953.

In June 1951, 203rd Division moved into Korean Peninsula along with the Corps HQ. It was engaged in defensive operations against UN Forces in summer-fall 1951, during which it suffered heavy casualties. In June–July 1953, the division took part in the Battle of Kumsong during which it decimated the ROK Capital Division guarding the left shoulder of the Kumsong bulge.

In March 1955 the division pulled out from North Korea and redeployed in Xuzhou, Jiangsu province.

In April 1960 the division was renamed as 204th Army Division(Chinese: 陆军第204师). By then the division was composed of:

- 610th Regiment
- 611th Regiment
- 612th Regiment
- 584th Artillery Regiment

In December 1968, the division was transferred under 67th Army Corps' control.

In August 1969, 584th Artillery Regiment was renamed as Artillery Regiment, 204th Army Division.

In April 1970, the division returned to 68th Army Corps' control.

In May 1976, the division moved to Yanji, Jilin along with the corps HQ.

In September 1985 the division was inactivated and merged into the 6th Garrison Division of Shenyang Military Region
