= 88th Division (1st Formation) (People's Republic of China) =

Military formation

The 88th Division was a military formation of the People's Volunteer Army (Chinese People's Volunteers (CPV) or Chinese Communist Forces (CCF)) during the Korean War. They were a component of the 30th Army. The 88th Division was assigned as a reinforcing Division to the 26th Army.

== Current ==
The current status of the unit is unknown.
