= 50th Army (China) =

Former Chinese military unit

The 50th Army was a military formation of the People's Liberation Army. Initially it was mostly composed of Chinese Nationalist soldiers surrendered to the Communist side during the Chinese Civil War.

During the Korean War, it was part of the People's Volunteer Army (Chinese People's Volunteers (CPV)) XIII Army Group. It was composed of the 148th, 149th, and 150th Divisions.

On October 25, 1950, the 50th Army entered Korea as part of the Chinese People's Volunteers. The 50th Army deployed southward on the CCF west flank and remained in reserve during the CCF First Phase Offensive. It was responsible for the destruction of British 1st Battalion, Royal Ulster Rifles during the Third Battle of Seoul.

The army's complete destruction during Operation Thunderbolt in February 1951 sparked controversies over the treatment of Nationalist POWs impressed into Communist service. Returned to Manchuria in March 1951 (from 15 March 1951?) for rest and refit.

In 1985 the 50th Army was disbanded but the new 149th Division joined the 13th Army.
