= 115th Mechanized Infantry Brigade (People's Republic of China) =

Brigade of the People's Liberation Army

The 115th Division was a military formation of the People's Volunteer Army (Chinese People's Volunteers (CPV) or Chinese Communist Forces (CCF)) during the Korean War with a standard strength of approximately 10,000 men. It was a component of the 39th Army, consisting of the 343rd, 344th, and 345th Regiments.

The division was one of the first Chinese divisions to attack the UN forces at the Unsan where it inflicted heavy casualties on the 8th Cavalry Regiment. Stephen Gammons from the United States Army Center of Military History said this: The enemy [Chinese] force that brought tragedy to the 8th Cavalry at Unsan was the CCF's 116th Division. Elements of the 116th's 347th Regiment were responsible for the roadblock south of Unsan. Also engaged in the Unsan action was the 115th Division.

== Current ==
The unit appears to still be active with the 78th Group Army in the Northern Theater Command Ground Force, as the 115th Medium Combined Arms Brigade.
