= Li Zhimin =

Chinese military personnel

- 李志民
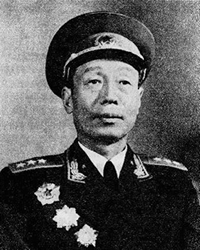
- Li Zhimin

Political Commissar for the Military Region of Fuzhou
- In office 1972–1977
- Preceded by: Zhou Chiping
- Succeeded by: Jiang Weiqing

Personal details
- Born: 9 July 1906 Liuyang, Hunan, Qing China
- Died: November 16, 1987 (aged 81) Beijing, People's Republic of China
- Party: Chinese Communist Party
- Education: Chinese Military and Politics University

Military service
- Allegiance: People's Republic of China
- Branch/service: People's Liberation Army Ground Force
- Years of service: 1928–1987
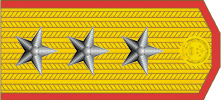
- Rank: General
- Battles/wars: Long March, Sino-Japanese War, Chinese Civil War, Korean War
- Awards: Order of Bayi (First Class Medal) Order of Independence and Freedom (First Class Medal) Order of Liberation (China) (First Class Medal)

Chinese name
- Chinese: 李志民
Transcriptions
Standard Mandarin
- Hanyu Pinyin: Lǐ Zhìmín

Li Fengrui
- Simplified Chinese: 李凤瑞
- Traditional Chinese: 李鳳瑞
Transcriptions
Standard Mandarin
- Hanyu Pinyin: Lǐ Fèngruì

Li Mingjie
- Simplified Chinese: 李明阶
- Traditional Chinese: 李明階
Transcriptions
Standard Mandarin
- Hanyu Pinyin: Lǐ Míngjiē

Li Zhimin (Chinese: 李志民 or 李凤瑞 or 李明阶; pinyin: Lǐ Zhìmín or Lǐ Fèngruì or Lǐ Míngjiē; July 9, 1906 – November 16, 1987) was a general of the People's Liberation Army from Liuyang, Hunan. Li was the former political commissar and director for the Political Department of the Chinese People's Volunteers.

Li joined the Chinese Communist Party in 1927 and the Chinese Workers' and Peasants' Red Army in 1928. He held various positions as Red Fifth Army party Secretary General and Second Division Security Bureau Chief prior to the Long March. Upon reaching Shanbei, he served as the director of the Central Military Commission for the eighty-first division. During the Second Sino-Japanese War, Li was the Hebei military region's Political Department deputy political commissar. After the establishment of the People's Republic of China, Li was the director for the Political Department of the Chinese People's Volunteers, Political Commissar for the Fuzhou military region and various other posts.

== Biography ==
=== Early life ===
He received private education when he was 9 and in 1924, went back to his hometown in Hunan to become a teacher. Li joined the Kuomintang in 1926, and was an elected member of the Gaoping District Division. In April 1927, Li decided to join the Chinese Communist Party (CCP).

In March 1928, Li was involved in the formation of guerrilla units and carrying out armed struggles. In the same year in December, he participated in the invasion of Changsha under the post of the Red Fifth Army General Secretary. As the Political Commissar for the Red Fifth Army, he took part in the invasion of Changsha. In the spring of 1932, as the director for the Political Department of the Second Division he took part in the Battle of Ganzhou. This was an attempt to cover the main force of the CCP breaking out of the Fifth Encirclement Campaign against Jiangxi Soviet.

In October 1934, Li participated in the Long March. During the conflict in Fushan, Li was credited with the recruitment of 600-700 men and stockpiling of grain and cloth. During spring 1937, Li enrolled into the Chinese Military and Politics University of the Anti-Japanese invasion.

=== Sino-Japanese War and the Chinese Civil War ===
During the Sino-Japanese War, he had posts on both the front and support lines of the communist forces. In 1944 he served as the deputy political commissar of the Military and Political Department.

In December 1946, Li was the political commissar for the second column of the Jinchaji Field Army, spearing heading many assaults in this area. During the Pingjin Campaign, he fought in Zhangjiakou and other regions. Li participated in the Battle of Taiyuan in 1949 as the director of the Political Department of the People's Liberation Army 20th Corps. Following the Battle of Taiyuan, Li replaced Luo Ruiqing as the political commissar of the 19th Corps and led his troops to engage in the Battle of Lanzhou and Battle of Ningxia.

=== After the Formation of the PRC ===
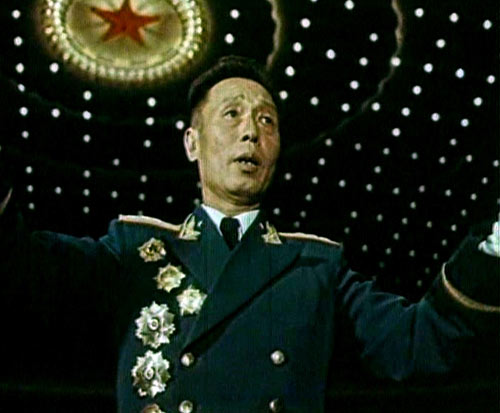
Li Zhimin as the "general chorus" conductor during the performances in the People's Great Hall in 1959

In late 1949, Li Zhimin served as political commissar of the Military District of Shaanxi. During the Korean War, he was appointed as the 19th People's Volunteer Army political commissar.

After his return to China in 1957, Li was appointed as the Political Commissar of the Military Academy. Despite being persecuted during the Cultural Revolution, Li assumed role of political commissar for the Fuzhou Military Region in 1972.

Li Zhimin was an alternate member of the 8th CCP Central Committee, member of the 10th and 11th Central Committee, representative at the 1st and 4th National People's Congress. He was elected to the CCP's Central Advisory Committee in 1982. On November 11, 1987, Li died in Beijing.

Military offices
Preceded by Zhou Chiping	Political Commissar for the Military Region of Fuzhou; 1972–1977	Succeeded by Jiang Weiqing
