= 67th Group Army =

The 67th Group Army was a military formation of the People's Liberation Army that existed from the civil war era until the disarmament of 1999. In its last years it was part of the Jinan Military Region with its headquarters at Zibo.

== History ==
The predecessor of the 67th group army was the troops of the Jin-Cha-Ji military district. After the victory against Japan, it was reorganized into the Second Column of the Jin-Cha-Ji region. Guo Tianmin (later Yang Dezhi) served as commander, Li Zhimin was the political commissar.

During the civil war, it participated in the main fighting in North China.

In June 1951, it entered Korea under the command of Li Xiang, with Commissar Kuang Fuzhao, and the 199th, 200th, and 201st Divisions. In the summer of 1953, during the counterattacks, he took the position of the position and repulsed the enemy's attack.

In the 1980s, participated in the Sino-Vietnamese conflicts 1979–90, and the army's 199th Division achieved large fighting results.

The army was dissolved in 1999. In Dennis Blasko's 2002 RAND chapter, he wrote that the army headquarters (the 54862 Unit) in Zibo, Shandong, had been disbanded, and the 199th Division (54871 Unit) had been resubordinated to the 26th Group Army, 'as other 67GA units may have been.'
