= 20th Group Army =

- Active: 1949-present (disbands 2017?)
- Country: China
- Garrison/HQ: Kaifeng, Henan

The 20th Group Army is a military formation of the People's Liberation Army Ground Force, stationed in the Jinan Military Region. It consists of two manoeuvre brigades with other attached or otherwise organic units. For some time after its formation in 1949, the army consisted of three divisions.

In mid 2017, it was reported by China Defense Blogspot that the army would disband.

== History ==
The 20th Army started as the communist Red Army Eastern Fujian Independent Division, a collection of guerrilla forces operating in Eastern Fujian Province during the 1920s. After the Japanese invasion, it was incorporated into the New Fourth Army as Third Support Group, 6th Regiment. It was first under the command of Jiangnan Headquarters, and then Subei Headquarters with a nickname, "Jiangnan Anti-Japanese Righteous and Brave Army" (Jiangnan Kangri Yiyong Jun).

In October 1940, it defeated the Nationalist's anti-communist elements in the battle of Yellow Bridge (Huang Qiao). After the Wannan incident of January 1941, the 6th Regiment was reformed as 1st Division, New Fourth Army. In December 1944, under the command of Su Yu, the 1st Division and its three main regiments, moved down south and crossed the Yangtze river and became the 4th Column of the Zhejiang Military District (MD), while the wounded remained in Jiangnan and formed the "Jiang Anti-Japanese Eastern Route Headquarters" and later became part of the 6th Division, 18th Brigade, New Fourth Army, eventually rejoining the 20th Army as 59th Division's 175th Regiment.

After the victory of the Second Sino-Japanese War in late 1945, and according to the treaty of Zhongqing, Zhejing MD's military forces were ordered to moved north into Shandong province and joined the newly formed Shandong Field Army as its 1st Column with Ye Fei and its commander and Lai Chuanzhu as the political commissar. The 1st Column's three main elements were the 1st Brigade (ex-Zhejiang 4th Column), 2nd Brigade (ex-Suzhong's MD's training brigade), and the 3rd Brigade (ex-Zhejing's 2nd Column).

In 1947, the Shandong Field Army was renamed as Huadong Field Army, and three brigades of the 1st Column were enlarged to Division size as the 1st, 2nd and 3rd Divisions. The 1st Column became the main fighting formation of the Huadong Field Army and took parts in epic battles such as Mengling, Yu Wan Su, and Huaihai.

In February 1949, the 1st Column was renamed and reassigned as PLA 20th Army of 3rd Field Army, 9th Army Group, with Lu Fei as its commander and Chen Shifu as the political commissar. Its three divisions were renamed as 58th, 59th, 60th Infantry Divisions. Right after the reform, the 20th Army took part in the battle of Yangtze Crossing, and Battle of Shanghai.

After the Civil War, the 20th was stationed in the Jiangsu and Zhejiang areas and prepared for the invasion of Taiwan as a reserve formation.

After the Korean War broke out, the 20th Army entered Korea in November 1950 as part of the Chinese People's Volunteers, and returned to China in October 1952. It was one of the first PLA armies to return, and was located in the Zhejiang area.

The 20th Army consisted of the 58th, 59th, 60th Divisions and 89th Divisions, though the 89th Division was attached to the 20th Army from its parent unit, the 30th Army.

Elements of the 20th also took part in the 1979 Sino-Vietnam war. In 1985 the 59th Division was disbanded.

In May 1989, the 20th Army's 58th and 128th Infantry Divisions were deployed to Beijing to enforce martial law and suppress the Tiananmen Square protests of 1989.

In 1996 it appears that the 128th Infantry Division was transferred to the People's Armed Police.

In 1998, the 60th infantry division was reorganised as a motorised infantry brigade.

== Current ==
The formation remains active as part of the Jinan Military Region, as one of the new "all brigade" Group Armies.

Circa 2006 its headquarters was located at Kaifeng in Henan, and its subordinate units include the 58th Mechanized Infantry Brigade (Xuchang, Henan), the 60th Motorized Infantry Brigade (Minggang, Xinyang, Henan), an anti-aircraft brigade (Shangqiu, Henan), an armoured brigade (Nanyang), an artillery Brigade (Queshan), and an engineer regiment (Xinyang).

Unit 71315, an unidentified AAA Brigade, conducted live-fire exercises during the late autumn of 2002. The unit deployed from its normal location via train moved to its assigned operating location and conducted the exercises, defending against enemy aircraft and aerial surveillance. The exercise lasted roughly thirty-six hours and specifically tested two battalions.
