= 1st Mobile Corps =

Chinese internal security formation

- 第一武警机动总队
- Flag of the People's Armed Police
- Active: 2017
- Country: China
- Agency: People's Armed Police
- Type: Gendarme
- Role: Internal security
- Operations jurisdiction: Beijing, north-central China
- Headquarters: Shijiazhuang

Notables
- Significant operation(s): 2023 China floods

The 1st Mobile Corps, also translated as 1st Mobile Contingent, is a corps leader grade formation of China's People's Armed Police (PAP). It was formed in 2017-2018 during PAP reforms from units previously subordinated to PAP mobile divisions.

Mobile corps are rapid response formations tasked with internal stability, wartime support, and disaster relief. The 1st Mobile Corps is likely specifically tasked with reinforcing internal security forces in Beijing.

== History ==
The 4th Mobile Detachment, 1st Mobile Corps deployed 1500 officers, 115 vehicles and 8 bridges to assist in fixing dams and highways along with transporting relief materials after the 2023 China Floods.

== Structure ==
- Headquarters (Shijiazhuang, Hebei)
- 1st Mobile Detachment (Panjin, Liaoning)
- 2nd Mobile Detachment (Shenyang, Liaoning)
- 3rd Mobile Detachment (Gutongliao, Inner Mongolia)
- 4th Mobile Detachment (Tianjin)
- 5th Mobile Detachment (Dingzhou, Hebei)
- 6th Mobile Detachment (Baoding, Hebei)
- 7th Mobile Detachment (Puzhong, Shanxi)
- 8th Mobile Detachment (Zhengzhou, Henan)
- 9th Mobile Detachment (Pingliang, Gansu)
- 1st Special Operations Detachment ("Falcon Commando unit") (Beijing)
- 2nd Special Operations Detachment ("Overseas Guards Special Operations Detachment") (Tianjin)
- 3rd Special Operations Detachment (Shijiazhuang)
- 1st Transportation Detachment (Beijing)
- 2nd Transportation Detachment (Xi’an, Shaanxi)
- Engineering and Chemical Defense Detachment (Huludao, Liaoning)
- Helicopter Detachment (Puzhong, Shanxi)

== See also ==
- 2nd Mobile Corps
- OMON
- 1st Corps of the Ukrainian National Guard

== Sources ==
- Wuthnow, Joel (16 April 2019). China's Other Army: The People's Armed Police in an Era of Reform (PDF). Washington: Institute for National Strategic Studies. Archived (PDF) from the original on 4 July 2020.
