= 80th Group Army =

Chinese military unit

- 第八十集团军
- Country: China
- Allegiance: Chinese Communist Party
- Branch: People's Liberation Army Ground Force
- Type: Group army
- Part of: Northern Theater Command Ground Force
- Garrison/HQ: Weifang, Shandong
- Engagements: World War II; Chinese Civil War; Korean War

Commanders
- Current commander: Major General Hao Xingchen
- Political Commissar: Major General Zhen Yanbo

Insignia
- NATO Map Symbol

The 80th Group Army (Chinese: 第八十集团军; pinyin: Dì Bāshí Jítuánjūn), Unit 31673, formerly the 26th Group Army, is a military formation of the Chinese People's Liberation Army Ground Force (PLAGF). The 80th Group Army is one of thirteen total group armies of the PLAGF, the largest echelon of ground forces in the People's Republic of China, and one of three assigned to the nation's Northern Theater Command.

== History ==
=== Korean War ===
It was composed of the 76th, 77th, and 78th Divisions, and was augmented by the 88th Division from its parent unit, the 30th Army.

During the Korean War, the 26th Army was commanded by Lieutenant General Zhang Renchu.

The PLA's 9th Army Group began moving into Korea on 5 November. After the 20th Army had moved in, followed by the 27th Army, the 26th Army followed, moving east to Linjiang and Huchang as army group reserve, and defending against any advance down the Yalu River by the US Army 7th Infantry Division. On 2 December, General Song Shilun ordered the 26th Army south from the Huchang River to take over the attack on Hagaru-ri. Movement of the 26th Army was slowed and delayed by air attacks. Further, according to one of the Chinese histories, some elements got lost in a snowstorm. The 26th Army failed to reach Hagaru and launch an attack on the 5th Marines. Advanced elements did reach East Hill and attempt to hold that. And, on the night of December 6, as the 1st Marine Division was attacking towards Hagaru-ri, advance elements of the 26th Army did attack the column but failed to organize a coordinated attack. The 26th Army suffered some 10,000 cold-weather related casualties.

=== Tiananmen Square Protests of 1989 ===
In May 1989, the 26th Army's 138th Infantry Division was airlifted to Beijing to enforce martial law and suppress the Tiananmen Square protests of 1989.

Dennis Blasko wrote in 2013 that during the force reductions which began in 2003, the 138th and 199th Brigades, along with the 8th Artillery Brigade, were created from former divisions. The 83rd Division has also been associated with this army in public reporting in the last few years.

== Organization ==
The 80th Group Army is composed of:

- 47th Light Combined Arms Brigade
- 69th Heavy Combined Arms Brigade
- 118th Medium Combined Arms Brigade
- 138th Light Combined Arms Brigade
- 199th Light Combined Arms Brigade
- 203rd Medium Combined Arms Brigade
- 80th Special Operations Brigade "Taishan Eagles" (泰山雄鹰); stationed in Tai'an, MUCD unit 71770, formerly 26th Group Army special operations brigade
- 80th Army Aviation Brigade
- 80th Artillery Brigade
- 80th Air Defense Brigade
- 80th Engineering and Chemical Defense Brigade
- 80th Service Support Brigade
