= 1st Armored Brigade (People's Republic of China) =

Brigade of the People's Liberation Army

Tank Division, 4th Field Army(1949) 1st Tank Division(1949-1950) 1st Tank Brigade(1950) 1st Tank Division(1950-1998) 1st Armored Division(1998-2011) 1st Armored Brigade(2011-2017)
- Active: 1949.2 - 2017.4
- Country: (China)
- Type: Armored
- Size: Brigade
- Part of: 65th Army
- Garrison/HQ: Jixian, Hebei
- Engagements: Chinese Civil War, Korean War, Vietnam War, Sino-Vietnamese War

Commanders
- Current commander: Deng Hanqiao
- Notable commanders: Xu Qinxian

Insignia
NATO Map Symbol
1

The 1st Armored Brigade (formerly the 1st Tank Division , then 1st Armored Division ) is an Armored formation of People's Liberation Army of the People's Republic of China. The brigade now serves as the armored element under the 65th Army in the Beijing Military Region.

== Formation ==
The Tank Division, 4th Field Army(Chinese: 四野战车师) was activated in February 1949 in Tianjin, from Special Troops Tank Command, 4th Field Army.

In May 1949 the division was renamed as 1st Tank Division(Chinese: 战车第1师). In December 1950 the division was re-organized as 1st Tank Brigade(Chinese: 坦克第1旅, note the change on Chinese characters). By then the brigade was composed of:

- 1st Tank Regiment (medium);
- 2nd Tank Regiment (light);
- Motorized Infantry Regiment;

On November 3, 1950, the brigade was renamed as 1st Tank Division(Chinese: 坦克第1师). Its regiments were not affected.

== Korean War ==
From March 1951 to November 1952 the division entered Korea to take part in the Korean War as a part of People's Volunteer Army(CPA). From January to October 1953 the division spent its second deployment to Korea. After that the division moved to Fengtai, Beijing.

== After Korea ==
In February Artillery Regiment was renamed as Howitzer Artillery Regiment. On May 13, 1958, Motorized Infantry Regiment was renamed as Mechanized Regiment.

In 1959 the division moved to Changping, Beijing. Soon after it further moved to Jixian, Tianjin in 1962.

In December 1962 Howitzer Artillery Regiment was renamed as Artillery Regiment.

In August 1969 402nd Tank Self-Propelled Artillery Regiment from 197th Army Division was attached and renamed as 3rd Tank Regiment.

By then the division was composed of:

- 1st Tank Regiment;
- 2nd Tank Regiment;
- 3rd Tank Regiment;
- Mechanized Regiment;
- Artillery Regiment.

In August 1970 3rd Tank Regiment was detached and transferred to 79th Infantry Division as Tank Regiment, 79th Infantry Division. In September Mechanized Regiment was re-organized and renamed as 3rd Tank Regiment.

On July 1, 1976, Armored Infantry Regiment was activated.

During Sino-Vietnamese War in 1979, 130mm Self-Propelled Rocket Artillery Battalion (equipped with Type 70 130mm) from Artillery Regiment, 1st Tank Division was put under command of 124th Army Division, 42nd Army Corps for the infiltration in Cao Bằng region.

In January 1983 the division was put under command of 66th Army Corps.

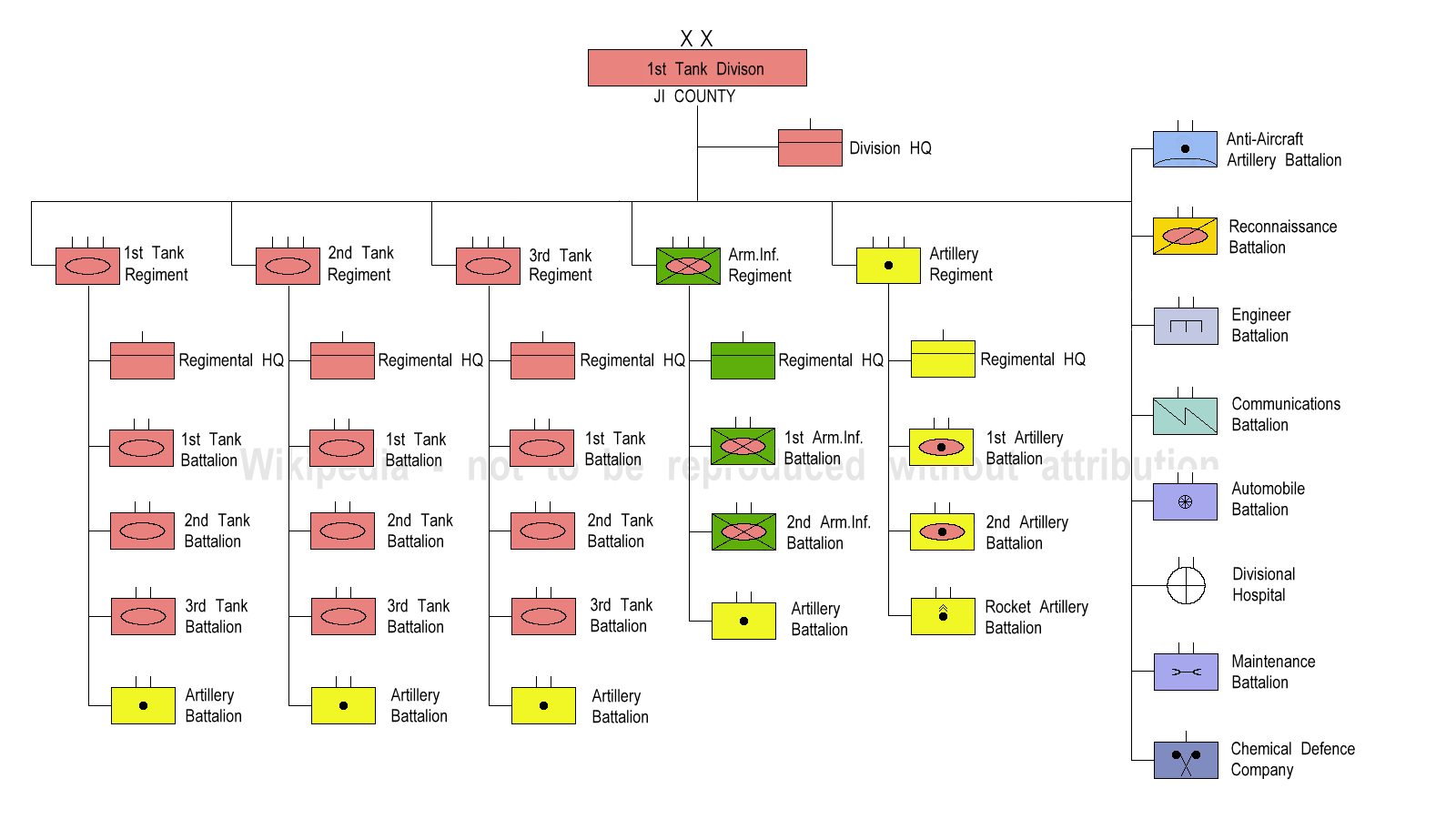
1st Tank Division, from 1983 to 1998.

In the 1980s the division was equipped with Type 59-2 medium tanks, becoming the only Type 59-2 unit in PLA ground force.

In July 1985 the division was attached to Tianjin Security District following 66th Army Corps' disbandment.

In 1989 the division actively took part in the enforced martial law and the crackdown on protests in Beijing. In the morning on June 5, 1989, a tank column from 1st Tank Division was departing from the Tiananmen square to move to Jianguomen area was temporarily stopped by a young man, now famous as the Tank Man. Allegedly the division commander, General Xu Qingren was sitting in the leading tank and ordered the stop until the tank man was taken away.

In April 1996 the division was attached to 24th Army.

In October 1998, the division was renamed as 1st Armored Division(Chinese: 装甲第1师). The Armored Infantry Regiment was disbanded and absorbed into tank regiments which became armored regiments.

By then the division was composed of:

- 1st Armored Regiment;
- 2nd Armored Regiment;
- 3rd Armored Regiment;
- Artillery Regiment.

In 2003 the division was attached to 65th Army following 24th Army's disbandment.

== "Division to Brigade" ==
In late 2011 it split into two: the division main body re-organized into 1st Armored Brigade, while half of its battalions reorganized into 195th Mechanized Infantry Brigade.

In April 2017 the brigade was deactivated and absorbed into 70th Combined Arms Brigade.
