= UN Forces retreat from North Korea =

1950 withdrawal during the Korean War

UN retreat from North Korea
- Part of the Korean War
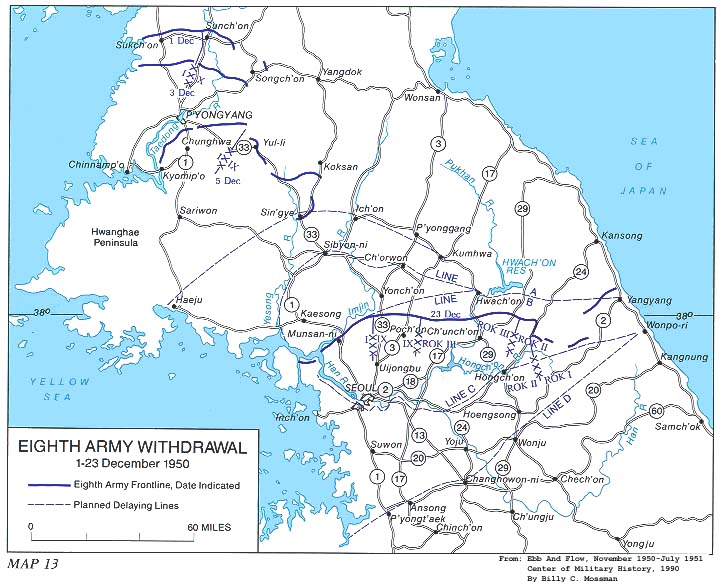
- Map of US Eighth Army retreat, 1–23 December 1950
Date	2–24 December 1950
Location	North Korea
Result	Successful UN withdrawal: UN completely withdraws from North Korean territory
Territorial changes	Chinese and North Korean forces retake all Korean territory north of 38th Parallel.

Belligerents
United Nations: United States; United Kingdom; Turkey; Australia; South Korea	North Korea; China

Commanders and leaders
(United Nations) Douglas MacArthur (United States) Walton Walker (United States) Frank W. Milburn (United States) John B. Coulter (United States) Edward Almond (United States) Earle E. Partridge (First Republic of Korea) Chung Il-Kwon (First Republic of Korea) Shin Sung-Mo	(North Korea) Choi Yong-kun (North Korea) Kim Chaek (North Korea) Kim Ung (North Korea) Kim Mu Chong (China) Peng Dehuai

Units involved
(United States) Eighth Army: (United States) I Corps; (United States) 1st Cavalry Division; (United States) 24th Infantry Division; (First Republic of Korea) 1st Infantry Division; (United Kingdom) 27th Commonwealth Brigade; (United Kingdom) 29th Independent Infantry Brigade; (United States) IX Corps; 2nd Infantry Division; 25th Infantry Division; (Turkey) 1st TAF Command; (First Republic of Korea) Republic of Korea Army: I Corps; 3rd Infantry Division; Capital Division; II Corps; 6th Infantry Division; 7th Infantry Division; 8th Infantry Division; (United States) Fifth Air Force (United States) X Corps: 1st Marine Division; 3rd Infantry Division; 7th Infantry Division; 1st Marine Air Wing	(North Korea) Korean People's Army: 1st Division; 2nd Division; 3rd Division; 4th Division; 6th Division; 7th Division; 8th Division; 13th Division; 15th Division; 19th Division; 27th Division; 41st Division; 43rd Division; 17th Armored Division; 105th Armored Division; (China) People's Volunteer Army: 20th Army; 58th Division; 59th Division; 60th Division; 89th Division; 26th Army; 76th Division; 77th Division; 78th Division; 88th Division; 27th Army; 79th Division; 80th Division; 81st Division; 94th Division; 38th Army; 112th Division; 113th Division; 114th Division; 39th Army; 115th Division; 116th Division; 117th Division; 40th Army; 118th Division; 119th Division; 120th Division; 42nd Army; 124th Division; 125th Division; 126th Division; 50th Army; 148th Division; 149th Division; 150th Division; 66th Army; 196th Division; 197th Division; 198th Division

Strength
423,000	(North Korea) ~97,000 (China) ~300,000

The UN Forces retreat from North Korea was the withdrawal of United Nations (UN) and Republic of Korea Army (ROKA) forces from North Korea that took place from 2–25 December 1950.

On 30 September 1950 ROKA forces crossed the 38th Parallel, the de facto border between North and South Korea on the east coast of the Korean peninsula and this was followed by a general UN offensive into North Korea to pursue the shattered North Korean Korean People's Army (KPA). Within one month ROKA/UN forces were approaching the Yalu River prompting Chinese intervention in the war. Despite the initial attacks by the Chinese People's Volunteer Army (PVA) in late October-early November, the ROKA/UN renewed their offensive on 24 November before it was abruptly halted by massive Chinese intervention in the Second Phase Offensive starting on 25 November. Following their defeat by the PVA at the Battle of the Ch'ongch'on River and tactical withdrawal at the Battle of Chosin Reservoir, ROKA/UN forces evacuated North Korea in its entirety on 25 December. ROKA/UN forces then prepared new defensive lines above Seoul for an expected renewal of the PVA offensive. The withdrawal from North Korea included many migrations of refugees fleeing from Chinese and North Korean forces that quickly recaptured North Korea. Two notable mass refugee escapes from North Korea include the Hungnam evacuation and the evacuation of Pyongyang.

== Background ==
On the night of 28 November UN commander General Douglas MacArthur met with US Eighth Army commander General Walton Walker and US X Corps commander General Edward Almond in Tokyo to assess the position of UN forces. Having received updates from his ground commanders, MacArthur judged that the Eighth Army was in greater danger than the X Corps, but he wanted both commands to step back. Walker was to make whatever withdrawals were necessary to escape being enveloped. Almond was to maintain contact with the PVA but also was to pull X Corps back and concentrate it in the Hamhung-Hungnam coastal area. MacArthur next asked Almond what X Corps could do to help the Eighth Army. Almond pointed out that the isolated Marine and Army troops at the Chosin Reservoir had to be retrieved before anything else could be done.

=== Eighth Army front ===
Following their victory in the Battle of the Ch'ongch'on River, the PVA did not pursue the US Eighth Army's 20 miles (32 km) withdrawal from the Ch'ongch'on to the Sukch'on-Sunch'on-Songch'on line. Only light PVA patrolling occurred along the new line on 1 December, mostly at its eastern end where there had been no deep withdrawal the day before. Walker nevertheless believed that the PVA would soon close the gap, resume their frontal assaults, and again send forces against his east flank. Walker now estimated the PVA opposing him to number at least six armies with 18 divisions and 165,000 men. Of his own forward units, only the US 1st Cavalry Division, 24th and 25th Infantry Divisions, the ROKA 1st Infantry Division and the British 27th Commonwealth Brigade and 29th Independent Infantry Brigade were intact. The ROKA 6th Infantry Division could be employed as a division, but its regiments were tattered; about half the ROKA 7th and 8th Infantry Divisions had reassembled but were far less able than their strengths indicated; and both the 2nd Infantry Division and Turkish Brigade needed substantial refurbishing before they could again function as units. Of his reserves, the four ROKA divisions operating against guerrillas in central and southern Korea were too untrained to be trustworthy on the line. His only other reserves were the 187th Airborne Regimental Combat Team and its attached Filipino and Thai battalions then guarding forward army supply installations; the Netherlands Battalion, which had just completed its processing at the UN Reception Center; and an infantry battalion from France, which had just disembarked at Pusan.

By Walker's comparison of forces, the injured Eighth Army could not now set a successful, static defense. Considering delaying action to be the only course open, a course in which he should not risk becoming heavily engaged and in which he should anticipate moving out of North Korea, Walker began to select delaying lines behind him. He intended to move south from one to the next well before his forces could be fixed, flanked, or enveloped. Though Eighth Army remained out of contact on 2 December, Walker received agent and aerial observer reports that the PVA were moving into the region east of Songch’on and that either they or North Korean guerrillas infesting that area had established blocking positions below the Pyongyang-Wonsan road from Songch’on eastward 25 miles (40 km) miles to Yangdok. They could be trying to secure a portion of the lateral route in advance of a drive toward either or both coasts, and should the drive go west into Pyongyang, they could trap the Eighth Army above the city. In view of the latter possibility, Walker elected to withdraw before the thrust materialized. Pyongyang was to be abandoned. Walker's use of relatively slight intelligence information in deciding to withdraw below Pyongyang reflected the general attitude of the Eighth Army. According to some accounts, Walker's forces had become afflicted with "bugout fever," a term usually used to describe a tendency to withdraw without fighting and even to disregard orders. Because it implied cowardice and dereliction of duty, the term was unwarranted. Yet the hard attacks and high casualties of the past week and the apparent Chinese strength had shaken the Eighth Army's confidence. This same doubt had some influence on Walker's decision to give up Pyongyang and would manifest itself again in other decisions to withdraw. But the principal reason for withdrawing had been, was, and would continue to be the constant threat of envelopment from the east.

=== X Corps front ===
In order to protect Hamhung and Hungnam while the 1st Marine Division and Army units withdrew from the Chosin Reservoir, in early December Almond was concentrating his forces there. Meanwhile, at Wonsan a 3rd Infantry Division task force and United States Marine Corps shore party group was to protect that area, load the supplies and equipment stockpiled there and then abandon the area. By nightfall on 4 December, 3rd Infantry Division commander General Robert H. Soule concentrated the bulk of his division in the Hamhung-Hungnam area. With the 1st Korean Marine Corps Regiment attached, he deployed on the 5th to defend a sector anchored below Yonpo Airfield southwest of Hungnam and arching northwest through Chigyong southwest of Hamhung to the village of Oro-ri (40.038°N 127.424°E) on the Chosin Reservoir road 8 miles (13 km) northwest of Hamhung. By dark on the 5th the greater part of the 7th Infantry Division also reached the Hamhung-Hungnam area. To assist the 7th's evacuation of Hyesanjin, the attached ROKA 26th Regiment had taken covering positions astride the main Hyesanjin-Pukch’ong withdrawal route about midway between the terminal towns. But the 7th Division came south without enemy contact. They demolished bridges and cratered the road behind them as far as the ROKA position and in continuing their withdrawal prepared similar demolitions to be exploded by the ROKA bringing up the rear. The 7th Division forces, after completing their withdrawal, put up defenses north and northeast of Hamhung adjacent to those of the 3rd Division. The leftmost position was not far east of Oro-ri, astride the road leading south from the Pujon Reservoir (40.611°N 127.541°E); the rightmost blocked the coastal road. The 7th Division block at the right was temporary. Almond's plan for ringing Hamhung and Hungnam now called for ROKA I Corps to hold the northeast sector, including the coastal road. But the nearest ROKA I Corps troops were still 100 miles (160 km) up the coast at Songjin, the rearmost another 40 miles (64 km) north in Kilchu. To assist the ROKA withdrawal, Almond arranged on the 5th through Admiral James H. Doyle to send five ships to Songjin to pick up the tail-end ROKA 3rd Infantry Division. The ROKA I Corps headquarters and the Capital Division meanwhile continued to withdraw overland.

== Retreat ==
=== Eighth Army withdrawal below Pyongyang ===
As Walker started his withdrawal from the Sukch'on-Sunch'on-Song-ch'on line on 2 December, Major general Doyle O. Hickey, acting chief of staff of the Far East Command and UN Command, arrived with word from MacArthur that, in effect, allowed Walker to leave behind any equipment and other materiel that he chose as long as they were destroyed. Walker, however, planned not to drop behind Pyongyang until the army and air force supply points in the city had been emptied and the port of Chinnamp'o cleared. To provide time for the removal he ordered a half step to the rear, sending his forces south toward a semicircular line still 20 miles (32 km) above Pyongyang. While service troops rushed to evacuate supplies and equipment from the North Korean capital and port, line units reached the temporary line late on 3 December with no PVA interference beyond being harassed by North Korean guerrillas on the east flank. Walker meanwhile pushed reserves eastward onto Route 33, the next Pyongyang-Seoul road inland from Route 1, to protect his east flank and to guarantee an additional withdrawal route below Pyongyang. He deployed the 24th Infantry Division at Yul-li (38.871°N 126.257°E), 25 miles (40 km) southeast of Pyongyang, and the partially restored ROKA II Corps at Sin'gye in the Yesong River valley another 30 miles (48 km) to the southeast. South and east of Sin'gye, units of the ROKA 2nd and 5th Infantry Divisions previously had occupied Sibyon-ni (38.309°N 126.695°E) and Yonch'on on Route 33, P’och’on on Route 3, and Ch'unch'on on Route 17 in the Pukhan River valley during anti-guerrilla operations. Route 33 thus was protected at important road junctions, and Walker at least had the semblance of an east flank screen all the way from Pyongyang to Seoul. Walker moved the damaged US 2nd Infantry Division from Chunghwa into army reserve at Munsan-ni on the Imjin River 22 miles (35 km) north of Seoul, where General Laurence B. Keiser, with priority on replacements, was to rebuild his unit. But while Keiser's immediate and main task was to revive the 2nd Division, Walker wanted him also to reconnoiter as far as Hwach'on, more than 50 miles (80 km) east of Munsan-ni, in case it became necessary to employ 2nd Division troops in those areas guarded by ROKA units of doubtful ability. Walker attached the Turkish Brigade to the 2nd Division. Hurt less by casualties than by disorganization and equipment losses, the Turks had collected bit by bit at several locations, mostly at Pyongyang. On 2 December, after General Yazıcı had recovered some 3,500 of his original 5,000 men, Walker ordered the brigade to Kaesong, 15 miles (24 km) north of Munsan-ni, to complete refurbishing under Keiser's supervision as more of its members were located and returned. Walker held the 187th Airborne Regimental Combat Team and its attachments in the Pyongyang area to protect his supply routes and installations. In preparation for the coming withdrawal south of the city, the airborne troops also were to keep civilians from moving over four pontoon bridges spanning the Taedong River, two inside Pyongyang and another pair 3 miles (4.8 km) east of the city, and to take whatever other precautions were necessary to insure an uninterrupted flow of military traffic over the crossings.

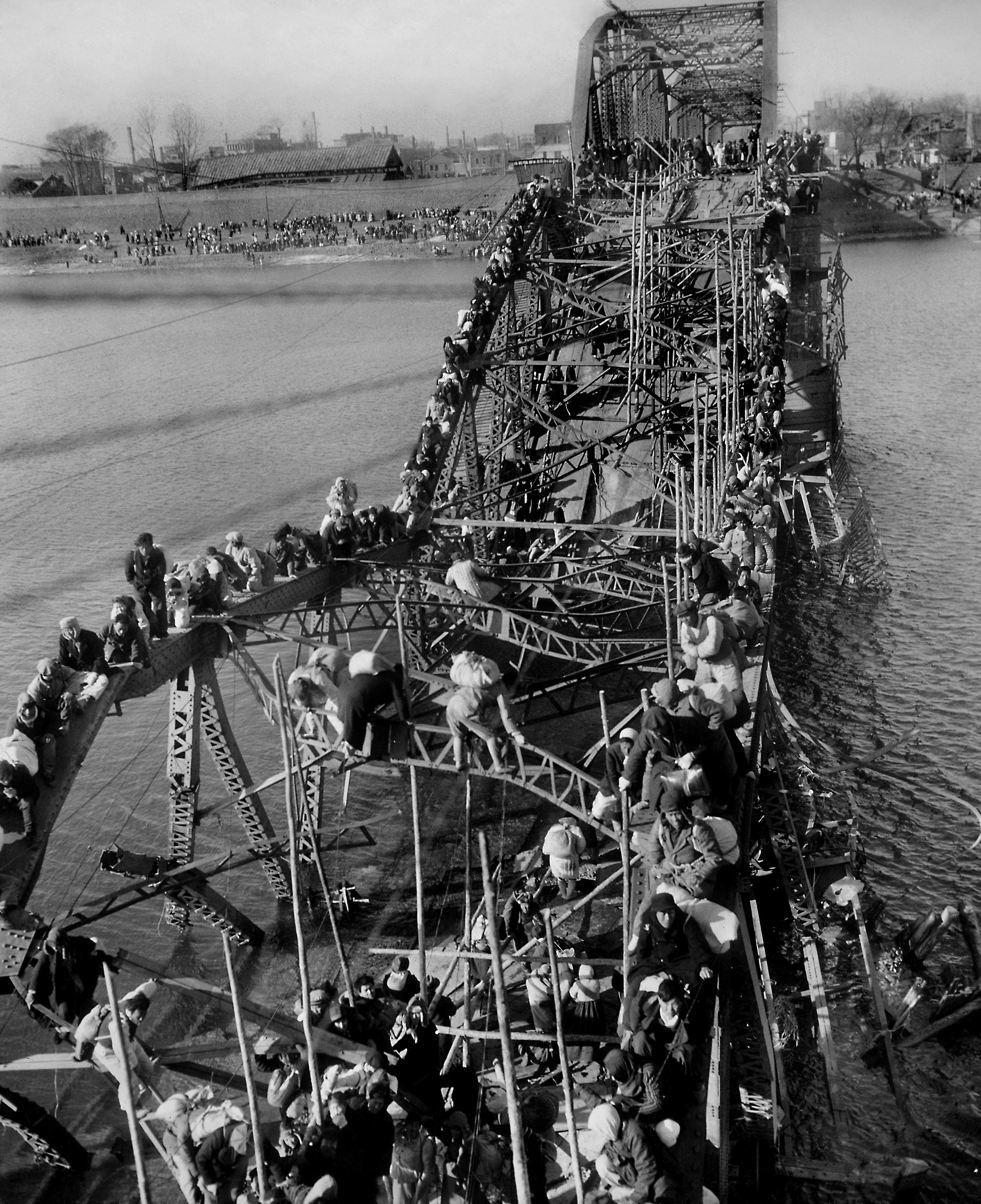
Korean refugees flee across a wrecked bridge over the Taedong River, 4 December 1950

On 3 December, after receiving more reports of sizable PVA movements and concentrations east and northeast of the Eighth Army position, Walker anticipated not only a westward PVA push into Pyongyang, but also a deeper thrust southwest through the Yesong valley and across the Eighth Army withdrawal routes in the vicinity of Sin'gye. Induced to haste by this possibility, he ordered his line units to drop 15 miles (24 km) behind Pyongyang beginning on the morning of the 4th, to a line curving eastward from Kyomip'o on the lower bank of the Taedong to a point short of Koksan in a subsidiary valley of the upper Yesong River. Walker warned them to be ready to withdraw another 50 miles (80 km) on the west and 20 miles (32 km) on the east to a line running from Haeju on the coast north-eastward through Sin'gye, then eastward through Ich'on in the Imjin River valley. The latter withdrawal would set Walker's rightmost units along the Yesong valley in fair position to delay a PVA strike through it and would eliminate concern for the Eighth Army's left flank, which, after the initial withdrawal below Pyongyang, would open on the large Hwanghae peninsula southwest of Kyomip'o. In withdrawing south of Pyongyang, US IX Corps, now with the US 24th Infantry Division attached, was to move on Route 33, occupy the right sector of the new army front, and reinforce the weak ROKA II Corps in protecting the army east flank in the Yesong valley. US I Corps was to withdraw to the west sector of the new line over Route 1 and, while passing through Pyongyang, destroy any abandoned materiel found within the city. I Corps' demolition assignment was likely to be sizable. Aside from organizational and individual equipment lost by the line units, the only notable materiel losses since the PVA opened their offensive had been 1,400 tons of ammunition stored at Sinanju and 500 tons at Kunu-ri. But now Walker's forces were about to give up the locale of the Eighth Army's main forward stockpiles, and although the smaller stores at Chinnamp'o might be evacuated, it was less likely that the larger quantities brought into Pyongyang over the past several weeks could be completely removed on such short notice. The improbability of clearing the Pyongyang stocks was increased by the necessity to give priority on locomotives to trains carrying casualties and service units, by heavy demands on trucks for troop movements as well as for hauling materiel from supply point to railroad yard, and by the problems of loading and switching trains in congested yards that earlier had been severely damaged by UN air bombardment.

With almost no PVA contact, Walker's forces moved south of Pyongyang within 24 hours. Much of the city was on fire by 07:30 on 5 December when the rearguards destroyed the last bridges over the Taedong and set off final demolitions in the section of Pyongyang below the river. Colonel Stebbins, Walker's G-4 who supervised the removal of materiel from Chinnamp'o and Pyongyang, would have preferred a slower move by 72 or even 48 hours. Given that additional time, Stebbins believed, the service troops could have removed most of the 8–10,000 tons of supplies and equipment that now lay abandoned and broken up or burning inside Pyongyang. More time also could have prevented such oversights as leaving at least 15 operable M46 Patton tanks on flatcars in the railroad yards in the southwestern part of the city. Fifth Air Force planes struck these overlooked tanks on 6 December, but differing pilot claims left obscure the amount of damage done. Although Chinnamp'o was exposed after early morning of the 5th, evacuation of the port continued until evening without harassment from PVA forces. Pressed only by time and the wide range of the Yellow Sea tides, the port troops from 2 through 5 December loaded LSTs, transports of the Japanese merchant marine, a squadron of U.S. Navy troop and cargo transports, and at least 100 Korean sailboats. Aboard these craft went casualties, prisoners, and materiel sent from Pyongyang; the supplies and equipment on the ground around the port; the port service units themselves; and some 30,000 refugees (most of them on the sailboats). Four American destroyers took station off Chinnamp'o, and aircraft from the British carrier HMS Theseus appeared overhead on the 5th to protect the final outloading. That morning the port commander received word from Stebbins to get the last ships under way on the favorable tide at 17:00. The last three ships pulled away from the docks near that hour. Demolition crews set off their last explosives, and shortly afterward the last men ashore drove an amphibious truck out to a waiting ship. Some 2,000 tons of supplies and a few items of port equipment had had to be destroyed for lack of time to remove them. The men and materiel sea-lifted from Chinnamp'o were landed either at Inchon (port personnel, rations, and petroleum products) or Pusan (patients, prisoners, and remaining supplies). Most of the stock evacuated from Pyongyang was shipped to depots at Kaesong and around Seoul. Some was kept forward aboard the railcars on which it had been loaded to institute a mobile system of meeting day-to-day requirements of the line units. These daily needs, mostly rations and petroleum products, were to be issued from the cars at railheads whose locations could be changed as rapidly as the line units withdrew. This system would reduce the likelihood of further materiel losses.

The trace of the new army position vaguely resembled a question mark. I and IX Corps defenses between Kyomip'o and Yul-li formed the upper arc, IX Corps positions on the east flank from Yul-li southeastward to Sin'gye shaped the shank, and clumps of army reserves below Sin'gye supplied several dots. The figure traced was appropriate since Walker now had been out of meaningful contact with PVA forces for five days, had no clear idea of the location or movement of the main PVA body, and could only speculate on what the PVA commander could or intended to do next.

In an attempt to fill the intelligence gap deriving from the withdrawals and the PVA slowness to follow, Walker on the 5th ordered I Corps commander General Frank W. Milburn and IX Corps commander General John B. Coulter to send strong reconnaissance patrols, including tanks, north as far as the Taedong River. But only the 1st Cavalry Division reported any noteworthy deep patrolling, on 6 December when two battalions sortied northeast up the Yesong valley and into Kokson, where they fought a minor skirmish with KPA troops, and on 7 December when two companies made another, but uneventful, visit to the town. Most of Walker's information continued to come from agents and aerial observers. The latter reported on the 6th that PVA troops were moving into Chinnamp'o and south across the Taedong estuary by ferry to the Hwanghae peninsula. Agents on the same day verified the presence of PVA troops in Pyongyang and reported that KPA regulars were joining North Korean guerrillas to the east and right rear of the Eighth Army. To escape the trouble these reports portended, Walker instructed his forward units to withdraw on 8 December to the Haeju-Sin'gye-Ich'on line and to extend that line east to Kumhwa. The west flank would again be anchored on the sea, and Walker's forces would be able to present a front instead of a flank to the KPA units reported gathering on the east. What now worried Walker most were the whereabouts and intentions of the PVA he previously had suspected were maneuvering into attack position just beyond his east flank. Because his forces at no time since 30 November had captured or even sighted a PVA soldier during the sporadic encounters along the army right, he was beginning to believe that all enemy troops immediately east of him were KPA. PVA forces, then, possibly were moving south, not into position for a close-in envelopment but around the Eighth Army some distance to the east through the X Corps' rear area. Since Almond's forces were concentrating at Hamhung and Hungnam far to the northeast, any such march by the PVA would be unopposed, and if the PVA moved through the open area in strength, they possibly could occupy all of South Korea with little or no difficulty. Walker anyway granted the PVA this capability and against the possibility of such a sweep took steps on 6 December to deploy troops across the entire peninsula. He planned no static defense. His concept of fighting a delaying action without becoming heavily engaged remained unchanged except that he now would delay from pre-selected lines stretching coast to coast. As a preliminary, Walker obtained MacArthur's agreement to erase the southern segment of the Eighth Army-X Corps boundary so the peninsula below the 39th Parallel, more generally south of a line between Pyongyang and Wonsan. He also arranged air and naval surveillance of the east coast south of X Corps’ position to detect enemy coastal movements while he was extending his line. He chose coast-to-coast positions running from the mouth of the Yesong River, almost 40 miles (64 km) behind Haeju, northeastward through Sibyon-ni, southeast through Ch'orwon and Hwach'on, then eastward to Yangyang on the Sea of Japan. This line, later designated Line A, was roughly 150 miles (240 km) long and at its most northerly point reached just 20 miles (32 km) above the 38th Parallel. Walker ordered five ROKA Divisions, the two of ROKA II Corps and three others then in central and southern Korea to occupy the eastern half of the line and to start moving into position immediately. I and IX Corps, scheduled eventually to man the western portion of Line A, remained for the time being under orders to withdraw only as far as the Haeju-Kumhwa line.

=== UN Command Order Number 5 ===
The apprehensions evident in Walker's appraisals and plans were apparent in Tokyo as well. MacArthur, although his main intention may have been to coax reinforcement, already had notified the Joint Chiefs of Staff (JCS) that the UN Command was too weak to make a successful stand when he informed them on 28 November that he was passing to the defensive. The JCS fully approved MacArthur's adoption of defensive tactics, but were not convinced that a successful static defense was impossible. They suggested that MacArthur place the Eighth Army in a continuous line across Korea between Pyongyang and Wonsan. MacArthur objected, claiming such a line was too long for the forces available and that the logistical problems posed by the high, road-poor mountains then separating Eighth Army and X Corps were too great. By concentrating the X Corps in the Hamhung area, MacArthur countered, he was creating a "geographic threat" to enemy lines of communication that made it tactically unsound for PVA forces to move south through the opening between those units. In any event, he predicted, the Chinese already arrayed against the Eighth Army would compel it to take a series of steps to the rear. The JCS disagreed that X Corps’ concentration at Hamhung would produce the effect MacArthur anticipated. In their judgment, the Chinese already had demonstrated a proficiency for moving strong forces through difficult mountains, and the concentration of the X Corps on the east coast combined with the predicted further withdrawals of the Eighth Army would only widen the opening through which the Chinese could move. They again urged MacArthur to consolidate Eighth Army and X Corps sufficiently to prevent large enemy forces from passing between the two commands or outflanking either of them. But MacArthur defended his view of a Pyongyang-Wonsan line, pointing out that he and Walker already had agreed that Pyongyang could not be held and that the Eighth Army probably would be forced south at least as far as Seoul. Turning his reasoning in support of a request for ground reinforcements "of the greatest magnitude," he emphasized on 3 December that his present strength would allow him at most to prolong his resistance to the PVA by making successive withdrawals or by taking up "beachhead bastion positions" and that a failure to receive reinforcements portended the eventual destruction of his command. The response to MacArthur's estimate was as gloomy as his predictions. Prompted by earlier dismal reports to visit the Far East for a firsthand appraisal, Army Chief of Staff General J. Lawton Collins informed MacArthur on 4 December that no reinforcement in strength, at least in the near future, was possible. The remaining Joint Chiefs meanwhile replied from Washington that preservation of the UN Command was now the guiding consideration and that they concurred in the consolidation of MacArthur's forces into beachheads. Beachhead sites that in varying degrees could facilitate a withdrawal from Korea were Hungnam and Wonsan for X Corps and Inchon and Pusan for the Eighth Army. Collins, while touring Korea between 4 and 6 December, heard Walker and Almond on the best beachheads and on how best to handle their respective commands. Almond believed that he could hold Hungnam indefinitely and wanted to stay there out of certainty that by doing so he could divert substantial Chinese strength from the Eighth Army front. Walker, on the other hand, believed the preservation of the Eighth Army required a deep withdrawal. Walker attempted to forestall any order to defend Seoul, insisting that tying his forces to the city would only allow the PVA to encircle Eighth Army and force a slow, costly evacuation through Inchon. He favored pulling back to Pusan, where once before he had broken the KPA offensive and where now, if reinforced by X Corps, Eighth Army might hold out indefinitely. MacArthur's G-3, General Wright, meanwhile recommended Pusan as the best beachhead for both the Eighth Army and X Corps on that grounds that should UN forces be compelled to leave Korea, they should leave the distinct impression of having delayed the enemy as long and as well as possible. Wright also pointed out that defending successive lines into the southeastern tip of the peninsula would afford UN air forces the greatest opportunity to hurt the PVA; further, if a withdrawal from Korea became necessary during the remaining winter months, MacArthur's command could escape extreme weather conditions at Pusan; finally, an evacuation at any time could be effected faster through the Pusan facilities than through any other port. To permit the longest delaying action possible and to enable an evacuation from the best port, Wright recommended that X Corps be sea lifted from Hungnam as soon as possible and landed in southeastern Korea, that X Corps then join the Eighth Army and pass to Walker's command, and thereafter that the UN Command withdraw through successive positions, if necessary to the Pusan area.

On 7 December in Tokyo, Generals MacArthur, Collins and George Stratemeyer, Admirals C. Turner Joy and Arthur Dewey Struble and Lieutenant general Lemuel C. Shepherd, the commander of all United States Marine Corps forces in the Pacific, considered the various views generated during the week past and agreed on plans that embodied most of the recommendations of Wright. MacArthur set these plans in effect on the 8th in CINCUNC (Commander in Chief, United Nations Command) Order Number 5. He listed nine lines to be defended by the Eighth Army, the southernmost based on the Naktong River in the general area of the old Pusan Perimeter. But he insisted that Walker not surrender Seoul until and unless an enemy maneuver unquestionably was about to block the Eighth Army's further withdrawal to the south. Related to this stipulation, four lines lay above Seoul, the last of which, resting on the Imjin River in the west and extending eastward to the coast, was MacArthur's first delineation of positions across the entire peninsula. Here the peninsula was somewhat narrower than in the Pyongyang-Wonsan region and offered a road net that could accommodate supply movements. Earlier pessimistic reports to Washington notwithstanding, MacArthur apparently believed that the Eighth Army and X Corps combined could man this line; indeed, he expected Walker to make an ardent effort to hold it. Through correspondence and interviews, MacArthur meanwhile had responded publicly to charges appearing in a substantial segment of the press that he was responsible for the reverse his forces were suffering at the hands of the Chinese. In defense of his strategy and tactics, he insisted that his command could not have fought more efficiently given the restrictions placed upon it by the policy of limiting hostilities to Korea. This criticism of administration policy rankled President Harry Truman, particularly because MacArthur voiced it publicly and frequently enough to lead "many people abroad to believe that our government would change its policy." Truman issued instructions on 5 December by which he intended to ensure that information made public by an executive branch official was "accurate and fully in accord with the policies of the United States Government." Specifically applicable to MacArthur, "Officials overseas, including military commanders, were to clear all but routine statements with their departments, and to refrain from direct communication on military or foreign policy with newspapers, magazines or other publicity media in the United States." The JCS forwarded the president's instructions to MacArthur on 6 December.

=== Eighth Army withdrawal to Line B ===
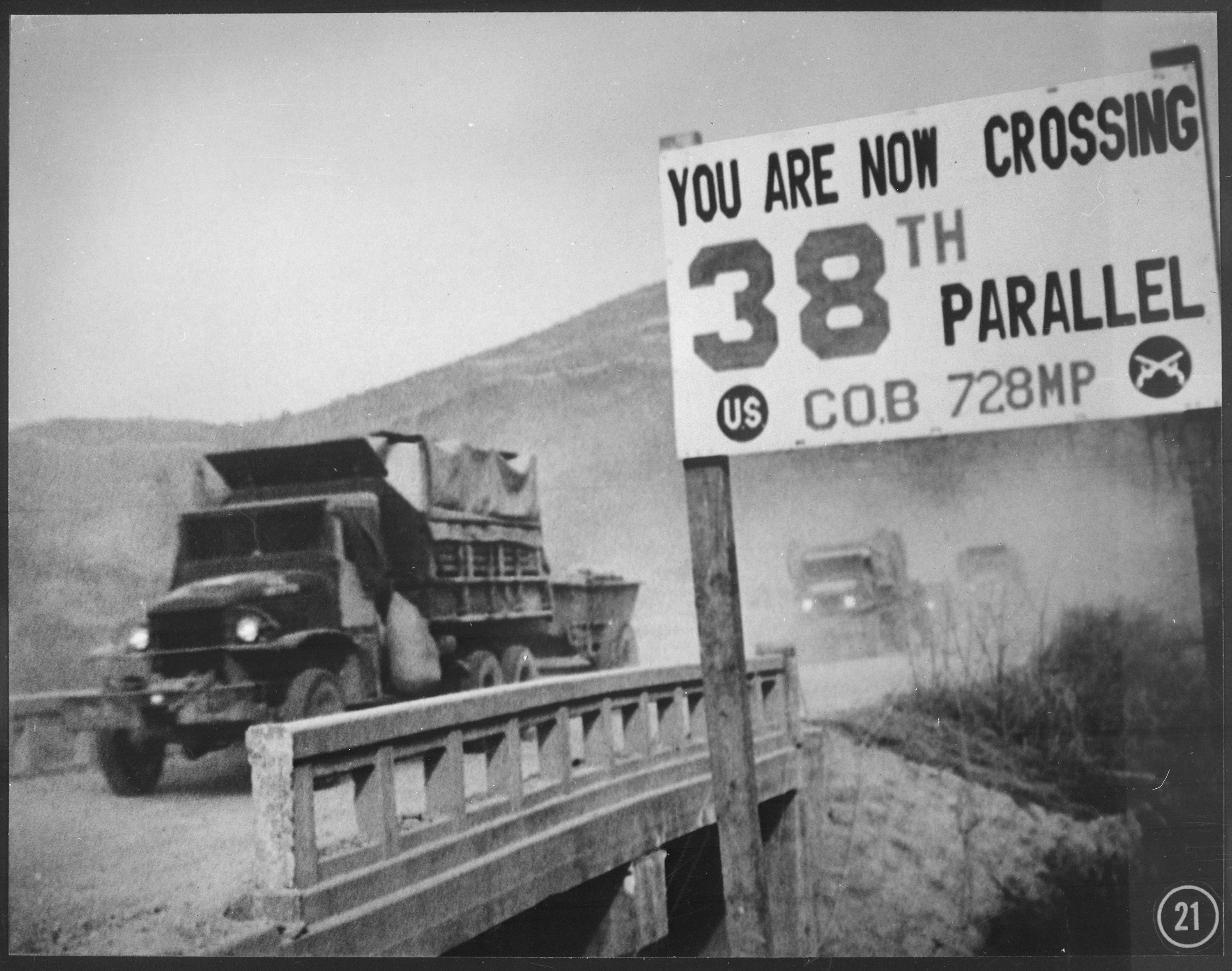
UN convoy retreats across the 38th Parallel

On 7 December MacArthur had radioed a warning to both Walker and Almond of the next day's order for successive withdrawals, the defense of Seoul short of becoming entrapped, and the assignment of X Corps to the Eighth Army. So guided, Walker on the 8th laid out Line B, which duplicated Line A eastward from Hwach'on but in the opposite direction fell off to the southwest to trace the lower bank of the Imjin and Han Rivers, some 20 miles (32 km) behind the Yesong River. This line was at least 20 miles (32 km) shorter than Line A and matched the northernmost coast-to-coast line designated by MacArthur, and now became the line toward which Walker began to move his forces for the defense of Seoul.

On 11 December MacArthur made his first visit to Korea since he had watched the start of the Home by Christmas Offensive on 24 November. He was now on the peninsula for a firsthand view of the Eighth Army and X Corps after their setbacks at the hands of the PVA and for personal conferences with Walker and Almond on the steps the two line commanders had taken or planned to take in carrying out the maneuvers and command change he had ordered three days before. When MacArthur reached Walker's headquarters (having first stopped in northeastern Korea to confer with Almond), he was able to see not only the Eighth Army plan for withdrawing to Line B but also Walker's plans in case the Eighth Army again was squeezed into the southeastern corner of the peninsula. Reviving an unused plan developed by the Eighth Army staff in September, Walker reestablished not only the Naktong River defenses but also three lines between the old perimeter and Pusan, each arching between the south coast and east coast around the port. Nearer Pusan, the Davidson Line curved northeastward 68 miles (109 km) from a south coast anchor at Masan; next southeast, the Raider Line stretched 48 miles (77 km) from the south coast resort town of Chinhae; and just outside the port, the Pusan Line arched 28 miles (45 km) from the mouth of the Naktong. Walker instructed 2nd Logistical Command commander General Garvin to fortify these lines using Korean labor and all other means and manpower available within his command.

On the day following MacArthur's visit Walker established two more lettered lines. Line C followed the lower bank of the Han River just below Seoul, curved northeast to Hongch’on, 30 miles (48 km) below Hwach’on, then reached almost due east to the coast at Wonpo-ri, 15 miles (24 km) behind Yangyang. Line D, next south, ran from a west coast anchor 44 miles (71 km) below Seoul northeast through the towns of Pyongtaek, Ansong, Changhowon-ni and Wonju to Wonpo-ri. These lines were to be occupied if and when enemy pressure forced the Eighth Army to give up Seoul, but before any deep withdrawal as far as the Naktong was required. Amid this contingency planning and through 22 December Walker gradually pulled his forward units south and pushed ROKA forces north into positions generally along Line B. US I and IX Corps, withdrawing over Routes 1 and 33, bounded in three-day intervals through the Haeju-Kumhwa line and Line A toward sectors along the western third of Line B. The withdrawal was uncontested except for minor encounters with KPA troops on IX Corps' east flank, but thousands of refugees moving with and trailing the two Corps had to be turned off the main roads lest they block the withdrawal routes. By 23 December both Corps occupied stable positions in their new sectors. I Corps, with two divisions and a brigade, stood along Route 1 along the lower banks of the Han and the Imjin; IX Corps, with two divisions, blocked Routes 33 and 3 right at the 38th Parallel. Spreading ROKA forces along the remainder of the line proved more frustrating. Transportation requirements exceeded available trucks: resistance from KPA troops in the central region slowed the ROKA; and general confusion among the sketchily trained ROKA units caused further delay. But by 23 December Walker managed to get ROKA III Corps up from southern Korea and, with three divisions, emplaced in a central sector adjoining IX Corps on the east. The ROKA front lay below Line B, almost exactly on the 38th Parallel, with its center located about 8 miles (13 km) north of Ch’unch’on. In more rugged ground next east, ROKA II Corps occupied a narrow one division front astride Route 24, which passed southwestward through the Hongch’on River valley. II Corps thus blocked what otherwise could provide PVA/KPA forces easy access south through central Korea over Route 29 and to lateral routes leading west to the Seoul area. By 20 December ROKA I Corps had been sea lifted in increments out of northeastern Korea, landed at Pusan and near Samch’ok close to the east coast anchor of Line B, and transferred to Eighth Army control. Walker immediately committed ROKA I Corps to defend the eastern end of the army line. By the 23rd ROKA I Corps, with two divisions, occupied scattered positions blocking several mountain tracks and the east coast road. Regardless of his success in stretching forces across the peninsula, Walker lacked confidence in the line he had built. His defenses were shallow and there were gaps. He mainly mistrusted the ROKA forces along the eastern two-thirds of the line. He doubted that they would hold longer than momentarily against a strong PVA/KPA attack, and, should they give way, his forces above Seoul in the west would be forced to follow suit. It was to meet this particular contingency that he had established Lines C and D on 12 December. On the 15th he extended his effort by dispatching the 1st Cavalry Division out along the connected Routes 2-18-17 northeast of Seoul as added protection against any strike at the capital city from the direction of Ch'unch'on. The same day, he began moving his army headquarters less a small group to remain in Seoul, south to Taegu. He already had directed the removal of major supply stores located in or above Seoul to safer positions below the Han River and had ordered the reduction of stocks held in the Inchon port complex. On the 18th he assigned Corps' boundaries along Line C and described the deployment of army reserve units to cover a withdrawal to this first line below Seoul. Two days later he ordered the still-weak US 2nd Infantry Division, which by then had stepped back from Munsan-ni to Yongdungp'o, a suburb of Seoul just below the Han, to move to the town of Ch’ungju, some 60 miles (97 km) southeast of Seoul. From there the division was to be ready to move against any PVA/KPA force breaking through ROKA lines in central or eastern Korea and was to protect the flank of Walker's western forces in any withdrawal prompted by such a thrust. Keiser in the meantime had been evacuated because of illness, and Major general Robert B. McClure now commanded the 2nd Infantry Division.

To MacArthur, the elaborate preparations for a withdrawal below Seoul indicated that Walker had decided against a determined defense of the city. When MacArthur raised the question, Walker assured him that he would hold Seoul as long as he could. But, Walker pointed out, sudden collapses of ROKA forces twice before had placed the Eighth Army in jeopardy. Nor had the ROKA shown any increased stability even after strenuous efforts to improve it. If, as he suspected, the ROKA units now along the eastern two-thirds of Line B failed to stand against an attack, his positions north of Seoul could not be held and the then necessary withdrawal would have to be made over an obstacle, the Han River. In Walker's mind these two dangers, of another sudden ROKA collapse and of making a river crossing in a withdrawal, made his extensive preparations a matter of "reasonable prudence." Walker also was convinced that the PVA/KPA were now capable of opening an offensive at any time. He still had no solid contact with PVA/KPA forces, but by pressing intelligence sources over the previous two weeks he had obtained sufficient evidence to predict an imminent attack and to forecast the strength, paths, objective, and even possible date of the next blow. Between 8 and 14 December Walker caught a southeastward shift of the KPA II Corps, the bulk of which previously had been concentrated in and operating as a guerrilla force out of the mountains between Koksan and Inchon. Apparently having retaken regular status, the Corps paralleled the Eighth Army's southeastern withdrawals below Pyongyang. As Walker's forces spread out along Line B, the KPA Corps followed suit, occupying positions just above the 38th Parallel in the central sector, principally between Yonch'on in the Wonsan-Seoul corridor and Hwach'on, due north of Ch'unch'on. It also seemed that earlier reports of reconstituted KPA units joining the II Corps were correct. Several renewed KPA divisions apparently had assembled immediately behind the II Corps to make a total strength of 65,000 plausible for the KPA troops directly opposite the Eighth Army's central sector as of 23 December.

As late as 17 December Walker was still completely out of contact with PVA forces and by the 23rd had encountered only a few, these in the I and IX Corps sectors in the west. General Partridge, who had shifted the emphasis of Fifth Air Force operations to armed reconnaissance and interdiction about the time Walker had given up Pyongyang, was able to verify that PVA forces had moved south in strength from the Ch'ongch'on battlefields, but not how far. Until mid-December his fighter pilots and light bomber crews discovered and attacked large troop columns moving openly in daylight over main and secondary roads between the Ch'ongch'on and Pyongyang. But then, to escape Partridge's punishing attacks, the PVA reverted to their strict practices of concealment and camouflage and halted virtually all daytime movement. Walker, consequently, had no clear evidence that the main body of the PVA XIII Army Group had moved any farther south than Pyongyang. But on the basis of repeated reports from agents and air observers that PVA troops and supplies were moving southeastward from Pyongyang, by the 23rd he considered it possible that three or four Chinese armies with about 150,000 troops were bunched within a day's march of the Eighth Army's central front. This possibility brought the estimate of enemy strength above Walker's central positions to 180,000. Furthermore, Walker judged, these troops could be reinforced by any units of the PVA XIII Army Group remaining in the Pyongyang area within four to eight days and by the PVA/KPA units currently operating in the X Corps sector within six to ten days.

To Walker, the apparent concentration and disposition of PVA/KPA forces opposite his central front clearly suggested offensive preparations in which KPA II Corps was screening the assembly of assault forces and supplies. Small KPA attacks below Yonch'on and from Hwach'on toward Ch'unch'on seemed designed to search out weaknesses in the Eighth Army line in those areas and indicated the possibility of a converging attack on Seoul south along Route 33 and southwest over the road from Ch'unch'on. A likely date for opening such an attack, because of a possible psychological advantage to the attackers, was Christmas Day. Walker's largest hope of holding Seoul for any length of time in these circumstances rested on the arrival of the remainder of X Corps from northeastern Korea. Once he had Almond's forces in hand, Walker planned to insert them in the Ch'unch'on sector now held by the untried ROKA III Corps. This move would place American units along the Ch'unch'on-Seoul axis, one of the more likely PVA/KPA approaches in an attack to seize Seoul. Whether X Corps would be available soon enough depended first on how closely Walker had estimated the opening date of the threatening PVA/KPA offensive and second on how long it would take Almond to get his forces out of northeastern Korea and to refurbish them for employment under the Eighth Army.

=== Withdrawal of X Corps from northeast Korea ===
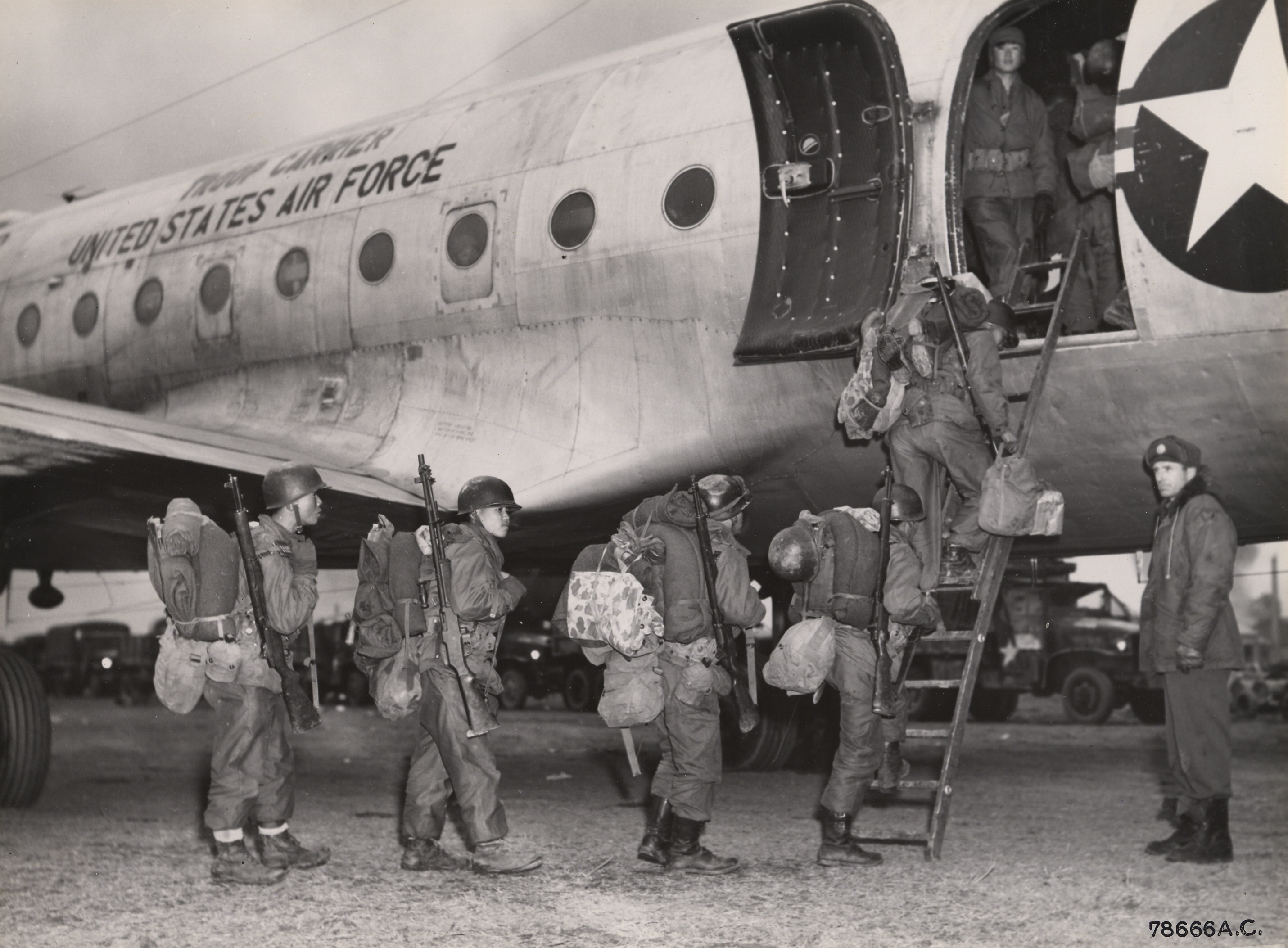
Republic of Korea Marines are evacuated from Yonpo Airfield

Following the earlier decision to concentrate X Corps forces at Hungnam, the evacuation of Wonsan had begun on 3 December. In a week's time, without interference from PVA/KPA forces, the US 3rd Infantry Division task force and a Marine Corps shore party group totaling some 3,800 troops loaded themselves, 1,100 vehicles, 10,000 tons of other cargo, and 7,000 refugees aboard transport ships and LSTs provided by Admiral Doyle's Task Force 90. One LST sailed north on the 9th to Hungnam, where its Marine shore party passengers were to take part in the forthcoming sealift. The remaining ships steamed for Pusan on the 9th and 10th. On 8 December 1950 Almond received MacArthur's order to evacuate X Corps through Hungnam. The Task Force 90 ships dispatched to Songjin on 5 December to pick up the tail-end troops of ROKA I Corps meanwhile had reached their destination and by noon on 9 December had taken aboard the ROKA 3rd Infantry Division (less the 26th Regiment, which withdrew to Hungnam as rearguard for the ROKA 7th Infantry Division; the division headquarters, division artillery and 18th Regiment of the ROKA Capital Division; and some 4,300 refugees. On 10 and 11 December the convoy from Songjin anchored at Hungnam only long enough to unload the Capital Division's headquarters and artillery for employment in the perimeter and to take aboard an advance party of the ROKA I Corps headquarters before proceeding to its new destination. On 9 December, Almond alerted his forces for a "withdrawal by water and air without delay from Hungnam area to Pusan-Pohang-dong area." The larger exodus was to be by sea, with the Hungnam defenses contracting as Corps' forces were loaded, but airlift was to be employed for as long as Yonpo Airfield remained within the shrinking perimeter.

The evacuation began on 12 December with the 1st Marine Division boarding ships and sailing for Pusan on 15 December, they assembled at Masan on 18 December and passed to Eighth Army control. The 1st Korean Marine Corps Regiment was evacuated by air from Yonpo Airfield on 15 December. The US 7th Infantry Division began loading on 14 December and most of the Division was on board by 16 December. On 17 December ROKA I Corps was embarked and it landed at Samch'ok on 20 December passing to Eighth Army command. Also on 17 December an X Corps advance headquarters opened at Kyongju and Yonpo Airfield was abandoned as the perimeter shrank. From 18 to 20 December the US 3rd Division relieved the remaining 7th Division units on the perimeter and Almond moved his command post aboard USS Mount McKinley. By 23 December the US 3rd Division withdrew to their last phase lines and the next day the evacuation was completed and the port facilities of Hungnam destroyed. In addition to the UN forces, over 98,100 Korean civilians had been evacuated from Hungnam, Wonsan and Songjin.

== Aftermath ==
In announcing the completion of X Corps’ withdrawal from Hungnam in a communique on 26 December, MacArthur took occasion to appraise UN operations from the time his command had resumed its advance on 24 November and, once again, to remark on the restrictions that had been placed on him. He blamed the incorrect assessment of Chinese strength, movements, and intentions before the resumption on the failure of "political intelligence... to penetrate the iron curtain" and on the limitations placed on field intelligence activities, in particular his not being allowed to conduct aerial reconnaissance beyond the borders of Korea. So handicapped, his advance, which he later termed a "reconnaissance-in-force," was the "proper, indeed the sole, expedient," and "was the final test of Chinese intentions." In both the advance and the redeployment south, he concluded, "no command ever fought more gallantly or efficiently under unparalleled conditions of restraint and handicap, and no command could have acquitted itself to better advantage under prescribed missions and delimitations involving unprecedented risk and jeopardy. But while MacArthur earlier had proclaimed that only by advancing could he determine PVA/KPA strength, he had not designed or designated the UN attack as a reconnaissance in force, nor was it. It was, rather, a general offensive whose objective was the northern border of Korea.

=== Ridgway takes command ===
On the morning of 23 December Walker left Seoul by jeep to visit units above Uijongbu, 10 miles (16 km) north, his jeep started past two 2 1/2-ton trucks halted on the opposite side of the road headed south. Almost at the same moment, a Korean civilian driving a 3/4-ton truck pulled out from behind the halted vehicles to proceed south and partially entered the northbound lane to get past the parked trucks. Walker's driver swerved away from the oncoming truck but was unable to avoid a collision. The impact threw Walker's vehicle sideways and overturned it, and all occupants were thrown out and injured. Walker was unconscious and had no discernible pulse when he was picked up by escorts in a following vehicle. At the 24th Division clearing station nearby, he was pronounced dead of multiple head injuries. In routine anticipation of casualties before Walker's death, MacArthur had obtained the agreement of the Army chief of staff that Walker's successor, if one was needed, should be Lieutenant general Matthew B. Ridgway, then serving on the Department of the Army staff as deputy chief of staff for operations and administration. On receiving word of Walker's death, MacArthur telephoned Collins in Washington to report the news and to ask for Ridgway. Near midnight on 22 December Collins notified Ridgway that he was the new commander of the Eighth Army, and hurried preparations on the 23rd put Ridgway in the air en route to Tokyo that night. Ridgway reached Tokyo's Haneda Airport shortly before midnight on 25 December. On the morning of 26 December Ridgway met with MacArthur whose instructions resembled those given to Walker: hold as far north as possible and hold Seoul as long as possible. The most to be expected of the Eighth Army, MacArthur told Ridgway, was an eventual tactical success that would clear and secure South Korea. A battlefield success of any substance in the meantime would help Washington answer what MacArthur called the "mission vacuum," meaning the question raised by the Chinese intervention of whether UNC forces could or should stay in Korea. When Ridgway asked near the close of the meeting whether MacArthur would object to a decision to attack, MacArthur replied, "The Eighth Army is yours, Matt. Do what you think best." Whereas previously MacArthur had played a key and direct role in planning and conducting tactical operations. He would do so no longer. Ridgway would make all the decisions regarding the employment of the Eighth Army with no requirement to refer them to MacArthur for approval. Ridgway would always inform MacArthur in detail of those decisions, but MacArthur would never question him. Before leaving for Korea at noon, Ridgway radioed his formal assumption of command of the Eighth Army with instructions that his message, translated as necessary, be read by all officers and by as many enlisted men as possible. "You will have my utmost," he advised his new command. "I shall expect yours."

On reaching the main Eighth Army headquarters at Taegu late on 26 December, Ridgway was displeased at finding the bulk of his staff so far to the rear. His immediate step was to get to the army forward command post. At dawn on 27 December he flew to Seoul, where the handful of staff officers he found deepened his resolve to remedy the headquarters arrangement. He planned not only to redistribute his staff, but also to move the forward command post to a more central location from where he could reach all Corps and divisions in minimum time. Following a staff conference and meetings with American Ambassador John J. Muccio and South Korean President Syngman Rhee in Seoul, Ridgway began a four-day reconnaissance of the Line B front that took him to all Corps and divisions except the ROKA Capital Division on the east coast, whose sector was quiet and unthreatened by impending PVA/KPA action. By evening of the 30th he was back at Eighth Army headquarters in Taegu, much disturbed by what he had learned. The Eighth Army was clearly a dispirited command. "I could sense it the moment I came into a command post... I could read it in the faces of... leaders, from sergeants right on up to the top. They were unresponsive, reluctant to talk. I had to drag information out of them. There was a complete absence of that alertness, that aggressiveness, that you find in troops whose spirit is high." The attack that Ridgway had hoped would be possible he now considered plainly out of the question. He also considered it imperative to strengthen the Eighth Army front if his forces were to hold Line B. Whether he had time enough to do so was questionable. Additional evidence of an imminent PVA/KPA offensive had appeared as Ridgway reconnoitered the front, and the coming New Year holiday was now a logical date on which to expect the opening assault.

=== UN forces on the eve of the Chinese third phase campaign ===
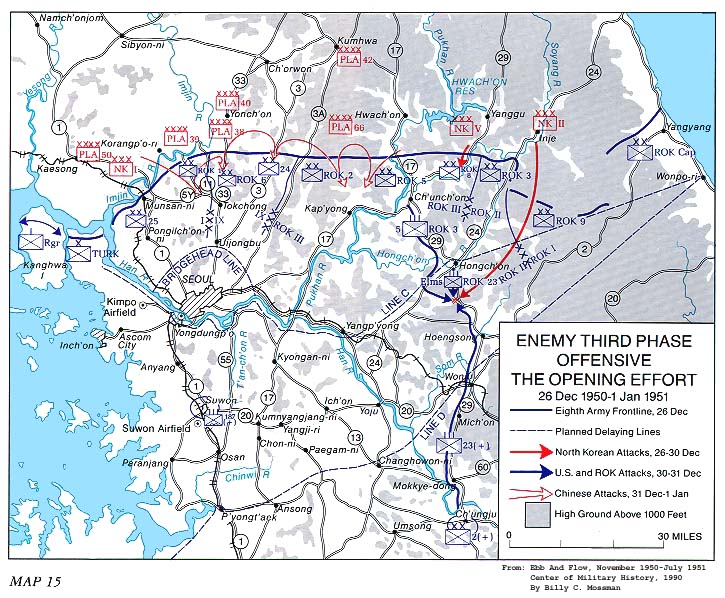
UN lines 26–30 December 1950

Unit dispositions along the line had changed little since Walker succeeded in manning it. The 8213th Army Unit patrolled Kanghwa Island at the extreme west in the I Corps sector. Next east, the Turkish Brigade overlooked the Han River estuary from the upper end of the Kimpo peninsula. Above the Han, the 25th Infantry Division, to which the Turks and Rangers were attached, straddled Route 1 along the lower bank of the Imjin River, and the ROKA 1st Division defended the Corps' right from positions along the Imjin reaching northeast almost to Route 33 in the Wonsan-Seoul corridor. The British 29th Brigade was assembled in I Corps reserve along Route 1 just outside Seoul. IX Corps lay across the Wonsan-Seoul corridor along the 38th parallel, the ROKA 6th Division astride Route 33 at the left, the 24th Division across Route 3 at the right. In Corps' reserve, the British 27th Brigade was assembled near the junction of Routes 33 and 3 at Uijongbu. The 1st Cavalry Division, also in reserve, retained the mission assigned to it while under army control of blocking the Ch'unch'on-Seoul road. Now attached to the cavalry division were the Filipino battalion and the Greek Expeditionary Force, an infantry battalion that had reached Korea on 8 December. Near the 38th Parallel above Ch'unch'on, ROKA III Corps defended a wide sector with the ROKA 2nd, 5th and 8th Divisions on line and the ROKA 7th Division in reserve. In the narrow ROKA II Corps sector next east, a single division, the 3rd, continued to block Route 24 running southwestward through the Hongch’on River valley. ROKA I Corps defended a gaping line at the Eighth Army right, with the 9th Division in the high mountains at the Corps' left and the Capital Division across the slopes and coastal road at the eastern anchor of the front. Ridgway's main reserve for strengthening the front was X Corps. Other resources present or scheduled to arrive in Korea by the end of the year were exceedingly few. The US 2nd Infantry Division, still not fully recovered from its late November losses, but now reinforced by the Netherlands and French battalions, was centrally located at Ch'ungju. In the west, the 187th Airborne Regimental Combat Team, with the Thai battalion attached, was assembled at Suwon south of Seoul. Outside these forces, the only available unit was the ROKA 11th Division currently operating against guerrillas in various locations to the south. The 2nd Battalion of Canada's Princess Patricia's Light Infantry had reached Korea in mid-December but was at Miryang in the southeast for eight weeks of training before entering battle. Similarly, the 16th New Zealand Field Regiment, actually an artillery battalion, due to reach Korea on the 31st, would require training before it moved to the front. The only units en route to Korea that might be able to move forward upon arrival were two US airborne Ranger companies, the 2nd and 4th.

Holding against the threatening enemy offensive, Ridgway judged, rested on committing most of his reserves early and on revitalizing the spirit of the Eighth Army. By the time he returned to Taegu on the 30th he had taken several steps toward achieving both. Restoring the Eighth Army's morale and confidence, Ridgway believed, depended mainly on improving leadership throughout his command, but before he would relieve any commander, he wanted personally to see more of the man in action, to know that the relief would not damage the unit involved, and to be sure that he had a better commander available. For the time being, he intended to correct deficiencies by working "on and through" his current Corps and division commanders. One deficiency he had noted was that many commanders conducted operations from command posts far behind the front. To correct this practice, he ordered "division commanders to be up with their forward battalions, and... corps commanders up with the regiment that was in the hottest action." He saw further weaknesses in leadership and staff work in the intelligence briefings he received. Confronted during one of the first briefings with a map whose main feature was "a big red goose egg... with ‘174,000’ scrawled in the middle of it," Ridgway said "Here the enemy was leaning right up against us, but we did not know his strength, and we did not have his location pinpointed." He attributed such imprecision directly to the Eighth Army's tendency to "look over its shoulder." As a result of this tendency, the line troops had not maintained proper contact with enemy forces or learned enough about the terrain to their front. He promptly rebuked his subordinates for failing to meet these two basic combat requirements. They were to patrol until they had defined the enemy's positions and determined the strengths of units opposite them, and he warned that he "didn’t want to ask any man where a trail went and have him tell me he didn’t know." Ridgway did receive another intelligence report from Eighth Army intelligence officer Colonel Tarkenton of the estimated strength of the Chinese XIII Army Group. The group's six armies, each with a strength of 29,000, were either along the Eighth Army front or in the immediate PVA/KPA rear area. Tarkenton believed KPA corps totaling 65,800 men also were at the front and that a fourth was approaching it. The greatest enemy strength seemed to be massed opposite the Eighth Army's west-central sector, an indication that the main attack would come through the Wonsan-Seoul corridor over Routes 33 and 3. A strong secondary attack farther east also seemed probable, either southwest over the Ch'unch'on-Seoul axis or south through Ch'unch'on and Wonju via Route 29, in an attempt to outflank I and IX Corps above Seoul. Two recent attacks by units of the KPA II and V Corps opened as Ridgway reached Korea, supported Tarkenton's prediction of a strong secondary effort in the east. 14 miles (23 km) northeast of Ch'unch'on, two KPA regiments coming from the Hwach’on Reservoir area hit the ROKA 8th Division at the right of ROKA III Corps and gouged 1 mile (1.6 km) deep salient before the ROKA contained the attack. Out of the Inje area, 25 miles (40 km) northeast of Ch'unch'on, a larger force believed to include a division and a reinforced regiment struck southwestward through the ROKA 9th Division's flimsy position at the left of ROKA I Corps. Entering the rear area of the narrow ROKA II Corps' sector, the attack force by 30 December established a strong roadblock on the central arterial, Route 29, almost 25 miles (40 km) below Ch'unch'on. By extending these gains, especially the deeper southwestward thrust out of the Inje area, KPA forces conceivably could sever the Eighth Army's main lines of communication.

Ridgway's first tactical move was to counter this threat from the northeast. On 27 December Ridgway ordered part of the 2nd Infantry Division north from Ch'ungju into the projected path of the KPA. McClure was to move a regimental combat team 25 miles (40 km) north to Wonju, from where it could oppose any KPA attempt to advance south over Route 29 or west along Route 20 and where it could protect a vulnerable link of the central Pusan-Seoul rail line, which served as an Eighth Army supply route. McClure was in the process of moving the 23rd Infantry Regiment and the French battalion to Wonju on the 29th when the KPA attack out of Inje carried behind ROKA II Corps farther north. Ridgway consequently ordered McClure to move the remainder of his division to Wonju and to send one regiment 25 miles (40 km) north of that town to Hongch'on where Route 29 from Ch'unch'on and Route 24 from the northeast intersected. McClure complied on the 30th, sending the 23rd Infantry toward Hongch'on to join the ROKA 23rd Regiment, 7th Division. Before the 23rd Infantry Regiment could complete its move above Wonju, the KPA force reported by ROKA III Corps to number between 700 and 1,200 men, blocked Route 29 6 miles (9.7 km) below Hongch’on. The 23rd's advance became a clearing operation, made in concert with a battalion of the ROKA 23rd Regiment, which moved south out of Hongch’on and with the reserve ROKA 5th Regiment, 3rd Division, which dropped south from Ch'unch'on to a point west of the KPA position and then struck eastward against it. The concerted effort cleaned out most of the roadblock on the 31st. The battalion of the ROKA 23rd Regiment returned to Hongch'on while the ROKA 5th Regiment and the leading battalion of the 23rd Infantry stayed to clear the remainder of the KPA position. The balance of the 23rd Infantry was strung out on Route 29, a battalion at Hoengseong 9 miles (14 km) below the roadblock site, the remainder still in Wonju where the rest of the 2nd Infantry Division was now assembling.

While installing the 2nd Division in the Hongch'on-Wonju area might hold off the KPA currently advancing from the northeast, the defensive weakness in the three ROKA Corps sectors left open the likelihood of stronger, more effective PVA/KPA penetrations. Against this possibility, Ridgway planned to reinforce this portion of the front, much as Walker had decided earlier, by setting X Corps in the Ch'unch'on sector now held by ROKA III Corps and by placing the bulk of his ROKA forces along a narrower, more solid front in the higher mountains and coastal slopes to the east. Since time was critical, Ridgway on 28 December pressed Almond and the commander of the 2nd Logistical Command, General Garvin, to quicken the readiness preparations of the 1st Marine, 3rd and 7th Divisions. The Marines, now reattached to X Corps, and the 7th Division were fully assembled but were still refurbishing and the 3rd Division, last to leave Hungnam, was not yet three-quarters ashore. The ships carrying the remaining 3rd Division troops were in Pusan harbor, however, and following Ridgway's 29 December order that these ships be unloaded without delay, the balance of the 3rd Division was ashore and en route to the division's assembly area south of Kyongju by nightfall on 30 December. Since it was nevertheless obvious that X Corps as currently constituted could not move forward for some time, Ridgway on the 29th approved plans developed by his staff for adjusting Almond's order of battle to permit earlier commitment. Under these plans X Corps headquarters and whichever of Almond's present divisions completed its preparations first would move to Wonju, where Almond would add the US 2nd Infantry Division and possibly one ROKA division to his command as substitutes for the two divisions left behind. Even this arrangement would take time; the estimate for moving one of Almond's current divisions from its southern assembly area to the battle zone was eight to ten days. Once forward, X Corps was to operate with the initial mission of destroying any PVA/KPA penetration of the ROKA front above it and of protecting IX Corps’ east flank. Ridgway gave Almond detailed instructions on the 30th. Having learned that the 7th Division would be ready ahead of the other two divisions, he directed Almond to move one of its regiments the next day to Chech'on, 20 miles (32 km) below Wonju, where Route 60 and a mountain road coming from the east and northeast joined Route 29. When Almond could get the remainder of the division forward, he was to assemble the 7th near the 2nd so that both divisions could be deployed quickly against any PVA/KPA penetration from the direction of Ch'unch'on and Inje or from the east toward Hoengsong and Wonju. Almond subsequently could expect to occupy a sector of the front. In the meantime, he was to develop Route 29 southeastward from Wonju through Chech'on, Tanyang, Yongju and Andong as the main X Corps supply route.

On 31 December Ridgway placed the 1st Marine and 3rd Divisions in army reserve. When fully refurbished, the Marines were to move from Masan to an east coast assembly in the Yongch'on-Kyongju-P'ohangdong area and prepare to occupy blocking positions wherever needed to the north. The 3rd Division was to reassemble in the west. As soon as Soule finished reorganizing and reequipping his forces he was to move them into the Pyongtaek-Ansong area 40 miles (64 km) south of Seoul and prepare them for operations in either the I or IX Corps sector.

=== The Seoul defenses ===
While reinforcing the ROKA sector of the front, Ridgway also deepened the defense of Seoul. After conferences with Milburn and Coulter on the 27th, he instructed them to organize a bridgehead above Seoul along a line curving from the north bank of the Han west of Seoul through a point just below Uijongbu at the junction of Routes 33 and 3 to the north and back to the Han east of the city. The Bridgehead Line would be deep enough to keep the Han bridges below Seoul free of PVA/KPA artillery fire. The position therefore would be suitable for covering a general withdrawal below Seoul that might accompany or follow the occupation of the Bridgehead Line. Milburn and Coulter each were to place a division on the Bridgehead Line if the expected PVA/KPA attack forced them to vacate their Line B positions. Ridgway at first restricted any I and IX Corps withdrawal from the present front to his own personal order. But on reconsidering the high estimate of PVA strength opposite the two Corps, the tendency of some ROKA units to break under pressure, and the demonstrated PVA preference for night attacks, he realized that this restriction could create a costly delay should Milburn and Coulter be unable to contact him promptly. He therefore authorized the two Corps' commanders to withdraw on their own at any time they agreed that it was necessary but could not reach him. No matter who gave the order, Ridgway insisted that a withdrawal to the Bridgehead Line be more than a mere move from one line to another; both Corps were to attack PVA/KPA forces who followed. The terrain could accommodate this tactic, especially in the Wonsan-Seoul corridor where the PVA/KPA would be obliged to use routes surrounded by higher ground. Ridgway expected Milburn and Coulter to leave strong forces of infantry and armor posted in this high ground as the two Corps withdrew; these forces would strike advancing PVA/KPA units and disrupt the follow-up before they themselves moved back to the bridgehead.

Ridgway attached the 2nd Ranger Company to the 1st Cavalry Division in the west and the 4th Ranger Company to the 7th Division in the east. Since the 2nd Infantry Division was operating in the Wonju area where the surrounding mountains prohibited armor, he ordered McClure's 72nd Tank Battalion to the west for attachment to IX Corps, which might use it to punish any PVA/KPA advance on Seoul. Anticipating an opening PVA/KPA attack towards the capital on New Year's Day, Ridgway returned there on the afternoon of 31 December. According to Tarkenton's latest intelligence estimate, PVA/KPA forces were fully deployed. In the west, KPA I Corps straddled Route 1 at the Imjin with the PVA 50th Army concentrated just behind it; the 39th Army had spread out near the Imjin between Routes 1 and 33; the 38th Army sat astride Route 33 below Yonch'on with the 40th Army assembled to its rear; and the 66th Army lay across Routes 3 and 17, its forces pointed at both Uijongbu and Ch'unch'on, with the 42nd Army backing it up at Kumhwa. Further east, the full KPA V Corps, previously in the area now occupied by the 66th Army, had joined KPA II Corps in the region between and below Hwach'on and Inje. This concentration, the expected arrival of KPA III Corps in the same area, and the probability that forces from PVA IX Army Group would move down into the same region from Hungnam represented, in Tarkenton's estimation, a sufficient force to exploit successfully the KPA gains already registered in the east. The preponderance of PVA/KPA forces above Seoul still pointed to a main effort against the South Korean capital over the Uijongbu-Seoul axis. In addition, PVA/KPA artillery positions sighted from the air disclosed a large number of guns generally astride an extension of the I and IX Corps boundary, all well disposed to support an attack through the Wonsan-Seoul corridor. Further, aerial observers had spotted a buildup of bridging materials near the Imjin. Prisoners confirmed these indications. Several revealed that a main offensive toward Seoul would open on the night of 31 December, and an officer from the 38th Army said that the offensive would begin with a coordinated attack by the 38th, 39th, 40th and 42nd Armies.

As Ridgway flew into Seoul and visited the western front by jeep during the afternoon of 31 December, vanguards of the PVA 116th Division, 39th Army moved down to the Imjin near Korangp'o-ri to begin the Third Battle of Seoul.

=== Nuclear Weapons ===
In the aftermath of the withdrawal, MacArthur created a list of "retardation targets" in Korea, Manchuria and other parts of China and requested 34 atomic bombs from Washington with the purpose of sowing a belt of radioactive cobalt to prevent any further Chinese advances. His request was strongly rejected by Truman.
