= Yao Baoqian =

Chinese military commander (1925–2017)

- 姚保钱
- Born: April 1925; Dingyuan County, Anhui, Republic of China
- Died: 7 June 2017 (aged 92); Tianjin, China
- Military career
- Allegiance: China
- Branch: People's Liberation Army
- Rank: Lieutenant general
- Commands: 24th Army; 215th Regiment, 72nd Division, 24th Army
- Conflicts: Second Sino-Japanese War; Chinese Civil War; Korean War
- Awards: Order of Independence and Freedom, 2nd class

Yao Baoqian (Chinese: 姚保钱; April 1925 – 7 June 2018) was an officer of the Chinese People's Liberation Army who served as commander of the 24th Group Army. He joined the Communist New Fourth Army during the Second Sino-Japanese War, and later fought in the Chinese Civil War and the Korean War. He was the first military commander to reach the disaster zone in Tangshan during the Great Tangshan earthquake of 1976.

== Biography ==
Yao was born April 1925 in Dingyuan County, Anhui, China. During the Second Sino-Japanese War, he enlisted in the New Fourth Army in March 1939, before turning 14. He joined the Chinese Communist Party in April 1942. He fought in many battles during the Sino-Japanese War and the ensuing Chinese Civil War, and steadily rose through the ranks.

During the Korean War, Yao served as commander of the 215th Regiment, 72nd Division, 24th Army of the Chinese People's Volunteer Army. He was later promoted to commander of the 197th Division, which was stationed in Tangshan, Hebei after 1969. During the Cultural Revolution, he served as director of the Revolutionary Committee of the city of Qinhuangdao.

In 1976, Yao was promoted to Chief of Staff of the 66th Army and stationed in nearby Tianjin. When the Great Tangshan earthquake occurred at 3 am, 28 July 1976, Yao was woken from sleep by violent shaking of the ground. Unsure where the epicenter of the quake was, he contacted all divisions of the 66th Army, but could not reach his own 197th Division. He set out with two soldiers and drove toward Tangshan. Because a major bridge was destroyed in the quake, they had to abandon the car and cross by boat, and did not reach Tangshan until 11 am. He was the first military leader to arrive in Tangshan, and led his soldiers in the rescue effort. However, most of the people they dug out were already dead, and they only occasionally found survivors under the rubble. Although Yao had fought in numerous battles in three wars, he described the Tangshan earthquake the most tragic experience in his life.

Yao was appointed commander of the 24th Group Army in 1983. He was also a member of the 6th National People's Congress.

Yao died on 7 June 2018 in Tianjin, at the age of 93.
