= 24th Group Army =

- Active: 1949-2003
- Country: China
- Size: Army
- Garrison/HQ: Chengde, Hebei
- Engagements: Chinese Civil War, Korean War

The 24th Army was a military formation of the People's Liberation Army. It was established in February 1949 and finally disbanded circa 2000–2003.

The 24th Corps(Chinese: 第24军) was activated in February 1949, which has originally consisted of the 70th Division (now 3rd Guard Division), 71st Division, and 72nd Division.

In October 1950, the 71st Division detached from the corps and joined the PLAAF.

In July 1952, the 73rd Division detached from the corps to join the 23rd Corps, which was later deployed into North Korea.

The 74th Division joined the corps on August 26, 1952, after the disbandment of the 25th Corps.

In September 1952, the corps, along with its 70th, 72nd, and 74th divisions, were deployed into North Korea as a part of the People's Volunteer Army. The corps originally garrisoned in Wonsan against amphibious threats. In December 1952 it was deployed into the Triangle Hill area,

In October 1955, the corps withdrew from North Korea and redeployed in Beijing-Tianjin-Tangshan area. It was then a part of the Beijing Military Region until its inactivation.

On January 1, 1957, the 74th Division detached from the corps to join the 66th Corps; the 197th Division attached to the corps from the 66th Corps.

In January 1960, the 70th Division was reconstituted into a mechanized division. In April 1960 the corps was redesignated as the 24th Army Corps(Chinese: 陆军第24军). By then the corps was composed of:

- 70th Army Division
  - 208th Motorized Infantry Regiment
  - 209th Motorized Infantry Regiment (activated on January 25, 1961)
  - 210th Motorized Infantry Regiment
  - 275th Tank Self-Propelled Artillery Regiment
  - 350th Artillery Regiment
  - Antiaircraft Artillery Regiment
- 72nd Army Division
  - 214th Regiment
  - 215th Regiment
  - 216th Regiment
  - 351st Artillery Regiment
- 197th Army Division
  - 589th Regiment
  - 590th Regiment
  - 591st Regiment
  - 577th Artillery Regiment
  - 402nd Tank Self-Propelled Artillery Regiment
- 127th Artillery Regiment
- 49th Anti-Aircraft Artillery Regiment

In 1961, the corps absorbed personnel and equipment from the disbanding 575th Artillery Regiment, 195th Army Division, and five battalions from the 592nd and 594th Regiment, 198th Army Division.

In April 1962, the 49th Anti-Aircraft Artillery Regiment was reduced to a battalion. The 402nd Tank Self-Propelled Artillery Regiment of the 197th Army Division was put under direct control by the army corps.

On October 25, 1964, the 3rd Engineer District of Beijing Military Region was activated by the army corps.

In June 1966, the 70th Army Division detached from the corps and joined the Beijing Guard District. By then the corps was composed of:

- 72nd Army Division
  - 214th Regiment
  - 215th Regiment
  - 216th Regiment
  - 351st Artillery Regiment
- 197th Army Division
  - 589th Regiment
  - 590th Regiment
  - 591st Regiment
  - 577th Artillery Regiment
- 3rd Engineer District of Beijing Military Region
  - 153rd Engineer Regiment
  - 154th Engineer Regiment
  - 155th Engineer Regiment
- 402nd Tank Self-Propelled Artillery Regiment
- 127th Artillery Regiment

In September 1968, the 402nd Tank Self-Propelled Artillery Regiment detached from the army corps and joined the 1st Tank Division.

In June 1969, all artillery regiments were stripped with number designations.

In October-November 1969, the army corps exchanged the 74th Division from the 66th Army Corps with its 197th Army Division. In the same month, the 3rd Engineer District of Beijing Military Region was reconstituted as the 71st Army Division.

In December 1969, the 74th Army Division was redesignated as the 70th Army Division. By then the corps was composed of:

- 70th Army Division
  - 208th Regiment
  - 209th Regiment
  - 210th Regiment
  - Artillery Regiment
- 71st Army Division
  - 211th Regiment
  - 212th Regiment
  - 213th Regiment
  - Artillery Regiment
- 72nd Army Division
  - 214th Regiment
  - 215th Regiment
  - 216th Regiment
  - Artillery Regiment
- Artillery Regiment

In 1976, Anti-Aircraft Artillery Regiment, 24th Army Corps was activated; Tank Regiment, 24th Army Corps was reconstituted from the 2nd Independent Tank Regiment of Beijing Military Region.

In November 1980, the 5th Garrison Division of Beijing Military Region and Independent Division of Hebei Provincial Military District joined the army corps. In March 1983, the 5th Artillery Division was put under the corps' control.

By then the corps was composed of:

- 70th Army Division
  - 208th Regiment
  - 209th Regiment
  - 210th Regiment
  - Artillery Regiment
- 71st Army Division
  - 211th Regiment
  - 212th Regiment
  - Artillery Regiment
- 72nd Army Division
  - 214th Regiment
  - 215th Regiment
  - 216th Regiment
  - Artillery Regiment
- 5th Garrison Division of Beijing Military Region
  - 18th Garrison Regiment
  - 19th Garrison Regiment
  - 20th Garrison Regiment
  - Artillery Regiment
- 7th Garrison Division of Beijing Military Region
  - 26th Garrison Regiment
  - 27th Garrison Regiment
  - 28th Garrison Regiment
  - Artillery Regiment
- 5th Artillery Division
  - 34th Artillery Regiment
  - 35th Artillery Regiment
  - 50th Artillery Regiment
  - 206th Artillery Regiment
- Tank Regiment
- Artillery Regiment
- Anti-Aircraft Artillery Regiment

In 1985, the army corps was reconstituted as the 24th Army(Chinese: 第24集团军). The 197th Army Division, 608th Anti-Aircraft Artillery Regiment of the 68th Anti-Aircraft Artillery Division, Anti-Aircraft Artillery Regiment of 66th Army Corps, 149th Engineer Regiment of Beijing Military Region attached to the army. The army was then composed of:

- 70th Infantry Division - a northern motorized infantry division, category A
  - 208th Infantry Regiment
  - 209th Infantry Regiment
  - 210th Infantry Regiment
  - Tank Regiment - former Tank Regiment, 24th Army Corps
  - Artillery Regiment
  - Anti-Aircraft Artillery Regiment - former Tank Regiment, 24th Army Corps
- 72nd Infantry Division - a northern infantry division, category B
  - 214th Regiment
  - 215th Regiment
  - 216th Regiment
  - Artillery Regiment
- 5th Garrison Brigade of Beijing Military Region
- 7th Garrison Brigade of Beijing Military Region
- Artillery Brigade - reduced from the 5th Artillery Division
- Anti-Aircraft Artillery Brigade - reorganized from the 608th Anti-Aircraft Artillery Regiment and the Anti-Aircraft Artillery Regiment of 66th Army Corps
- Engineer Regiment
- Communications Regiment

In 1989, the army participated in the crackdown on protests in Beijing with its 70th Infantry Division, 72nd Infantry Brigade, and the 7th Garrison Brigade.

In 1992, both the 5th and the 7th garrison brigades were disbanded.

In April 1996 the 1st Tank Division joined the army.

In 1998, the 72nd Infantry Division left the army and was reorganized as a reserve formation.

In the early 2000s, Blasko listed the army as consisting of the:

- Headquarters, 24th Group Army, Chengde, Hebei
  - 70th Infantry Division
  - 1st Armored Division (Tianjin)
  - Artillery Brigade, Changli
  - Anti-Aircraft Artillery Brigade

In 2003 the army was disbanded.

- The 70th Infantry Division was reduced to the 70th Motorized Infantry Brigade to join the 65th Army;
- The 1st Armored Division also joined the 65th Army;
- The Artillery Brigade, and the Anti-Aircraft Artillery Brigade were disbanded.

== Commanders ==
- Yao Baoqian (1983–?)
