= 162nd Motorized Infantry Division =

135th Division (1948–53) 135th Infantry Division (1953–60) 135th Army Division (1960–69) 162nd Army Division(1969-85) 162nd Motorized Infantry Division (1985-2017) 162nd Combined Arms Brigade (2017-)
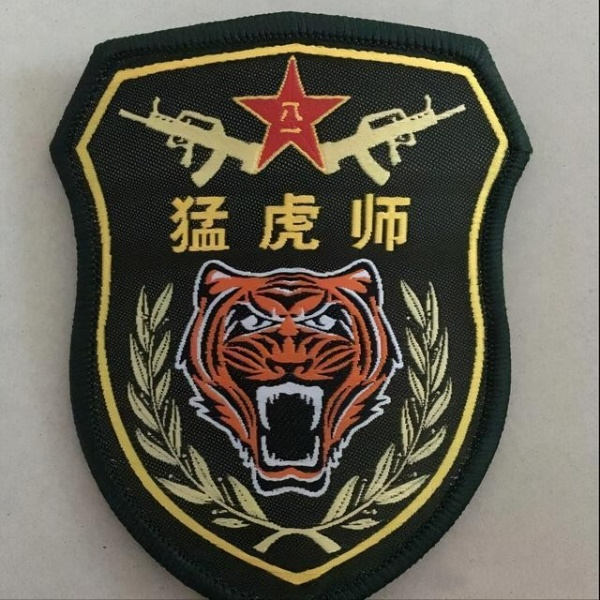
- Insignia of the 162th Division
- Active: 1948.11 -
- Country: People's Republic of China
- Branch: People's Liberation Army, People's Volunteer Army
- Type: Division
- Role: Motorized Infantry
- Part of: 81st Group Army
- Garrison/HQ: Zhangjiako, Hebei
- Nickname: Tiger of Zhongyuan division (Chinese: 中原猛虎师)
- Engagements: Chinese Civil War, Korean War, Vietnam War

Commanders
- Notable commanders: Ding Sheng

The 135th Division (Chinese: 第135师) was created in November 1948 under the Regulation of the Redesignations of All Organizations and Units of the Army, issued by Central Military Commission on November 1, 1948, basing on the 24th Division, 8th Column of the Northeastern Field Army. Its history can be traced to the 27th Brigade of Jireliao Military Region, formed in November 1945. Its first commander was Ding Sheng.

The division was part of 45th Army. Under the flag of 135th division it took part in several major battles in the Chinese Civil War.

In October 1952 45th Corps was re-organized as 54th Corps, and the division stayed under the command of the Corps.

In May 1953 the division entered Korea as a part of People's Volunteer Army. The division was involved in the Battle of Kumsong.

In 1953 the division was renamed as 135th Infantry Division(Chinese: 步兵第135师).

In July 1958 the division pulled out from Korea. In April 1960 the division was renamed as 135th Army Division(Chinese: 陆军第135师).

In January 1963 the division became a combat alert unit, making it a big division in PLA glossaries that was fully manned and equipped. By then the division was composed of:

- 403rd Infantry Regiment;
- 404th Infantry Regiment;
- 405th Infantry Regiment;
- 542nd Artillery Regiment.

In December 1969 the division was renamed as 162nd Army Division(Chinese: 陆军第162师). All its regiments were renamed as follows:

- 484th Infantry Regiment (former 403rd);
- 485th Infantry Regiment (former 404th);
- 486th Infantry Regiment (former 405th);
- Artillery Regiment (former 542nd).

In February 1979 the division took part in the Vietnam War under the command of the Corps. During the war it inflicted 2085 casualties to the confronting PAVN units.

In November 1985 the division was renamed as 162nd Motorized Infantry Division(Chinese: 摩托化步兵第162师). Tank Regiment and Antiaircraft Artillery Regiment activated. From 1985 to 1998 the division maintained as a Northern Motorized Infantry Division, Catalogue A. In April 1989 it became one of the first Emergency Mobile Operations divisions. By then the division was composed of:

- 484th Motorized Infantry Regiment;
- 485th Motorized Infantry Regiment;
- 486th Motorized Infantry Regiment;
- Tank Regiment (former Tank Regiment, 54th Army Corps);
- Artillery Regiment;
- Antiaircraft Artillery Regiment.

In 1998 Tank Regiment was renamed as Armored Regiment. Since then the division was composed of:

- 484th Motorized Infantry Regiment;
- 485th Motorized Infantry Regiment;
- 486th Motorized Infantry Regiment;
- Armored Regiment;
- Artillery Regiment;
- Antiaircraft Artillery Regiment.

The division is now one of the only two six-regiment infantry divisions in PLA ground force. The other one is 61st Motorized Infantry Division of the 21st Army.
