= 3rd Guard Division =

70th Division (1949 – 55) 70th Infantry Division (1955 – 60) 70th Army Division (1960 – 66) 3rd Guard Division (1966 – present)
- 警卫第三师
- PLA Emblem
- Active: February 1949 – present
- Country: China
- Allegiance: Chinese Communist Party
- Branch: People's Liberation Army Ground Force
- Type: Motorized infantry
- Role: Guard
- Size: Division
- Part of: Central Theater Command; PLA Beijing Garrison
- Garrison/HQ: Tongzhou District, Beijing
- Nickname: Imperial Army (御林军)
- Engagements: Chinese Civil War, Korean War

The 3rd Guard Division (Chinese: 警卫第三师) was created in February 1949 under the Regulation of the Redesignations of All Organizations and Units of the Army, issued by Central Military Commission on November 1, 1948, basing on the 16th Division, 6th Column of the PLA Huadong Field Army. Its history can be traced to the 2nd Detachment of New Fourth Army, formed in February 1940.

== History ==
The division, then as in today, is part of the 24th Corps. Under the flag of 70th division it took part in several major battles in the Chinese Civil War.

By then the division was composed of:

- 208th Regiment;
- 209th Regiment;
- 210th Regiment;
- 350th Artillery Regiment;

In September 1952, the division entered Korea as a part of the People's Volunteer Army. During its deployment to Korea the division took part in the Battle of Triangle Hill and the Battle of Kumsong, allegedly inflicting 9600 casualties on UN Forces.

In October 1955 the division pulled out from Korea and redeployed in the then Beijing Military Region.

In April 1960 the division was re-organized into a Motorized Army Division. In April Antiaircraft Artillery Regiment was activated from the former 209th Regiment. On May 11, 1960, 275th Tank Self-Propelled Artillery Regiment was activated and attached to the division. In January 1961 the 209th Motorized Infantry Regiment was re-activated. By then the division was composed of:

- Division HQ
- 208th Motorized Infantry Regiment;
- 209th Motorized Infantry Regiment(newly activated);
- 210th Motorized Infantry Regiment;
- 275th Tank Self-Propelled Artillery Regiment(newly activated);
- 350th Artillery Regiment;
- Antiaircraft Artillery Regiment(former 209th Regiment)

In late October 1962 the division was further organized into a Mechanized Army Division, becoming the second mechanized division of PLA ground force (the first one was 1st Mechanized Division). A tank battalion is activated in each now mechanized infantry regiments.

As of late 1962, the division was composed of:

- Division HQ
- 208th Mechanized Infantry Regiment;
- 209th Mechanized Infantry Regiment;
- 210th Mechanized Infantry Regiment;
- 275th Tank Self-Propelled Artillery Regiment;
- 350th Artillery Regiment;
- Antiaircraft Artillery Regiment

On June 15, 1966, the division was removed from the 24th Army Corps and was transferred to the Beijing Garrison and renamed as the 3rd Guard Division(Chinese: 警卫第3师). The 208th, 209th, and 210th Mechanized Infantry Regiments were renamed as the 7th, 8th, and 9th Guard Regiments, respectively. In August 1969 the 275th Tank Self-Propelled Artillery Regiment was renamed as the Tank Regiment, 3rd Guard Division, and the 350th Artillery Regiment was renamed as the Artillery Regiment, 3rd Guard Division.

Throughout the 1960s and 1970s, the division was the only mechanized formation following 190th Army Division's re-motorization, and the only unit possessing tank battalions for its infantry regiments.

Since December 31, 1974, the division became a "showcase" unit.

In January 1979, the 7th, 8th, and 9th Guard Regiments were renamed as the 11th, 12th, and 13th Guard Regiments, respectively.

The division participated in the crackdown on the civil unrest and protests in Beijing in 1989.

In 1992, tank battalions of the guard regiments were disbanded.

In 1998 the 12th Guards Regiment was disbanded. The Tank Regiment was renamed as the Armored Regiment, 3rd Guard Division.

== Current organization ==
Today, as one of only 2 active divisions of the PLA Ground Forces within Beijing and one of the few remaining divisions in service, it is organized into:

- Division HQ
- 11th "Tigers" Guards Regiment (showcase unit)
- 13th Guards Regiment (special security unit)
- Armored Regiment
- Artillery Regiment
- Anti-Aircraft Artillery Regiment
- Support Battalion

The division is permanently garrisoned in Beijing and thus helps provide for its defense and security as the capital of the republic.
