= China Revival =

Ship

History

PRC
- Commissioned: 2019

General characteristics
- Type: roll-on/roll-off
- Displacement: 45,000 long tons (46,000 t)
- Length: 212 m (695 ft 6 in)
- Beam: 28.6 m (93 ft 10 in)
- Depth: 15.3 m (50 ft 2 in)
- Propulsion: marine diesel
- Speed: 18.8 kt
- Endurance: 5000 nm
- Electronic warfare & decoys: None
- Armament: Unarmed
- Armour: None
- Aircraft carried: None

Chinese roll-on/roll-off (RR) ship China Revival (AKR) is a military/civilian dual use roll-on/roll-off (RR) ship built by Shandong Yellow Sea Shipbuilding Corporation in the People’s Republic of China (PRC) for the People's Liberation Army Navy (PLAN), and first entered civilian service on November 4, 2019, as ROPAX. When pressed into military service, it is used as a RR ship, a task the ship has successfully performed in military exercise conducted in October 2021 by 81st Group Army, transporting personnel and equipment of the latter.

In its civilian ROPAX role, China Revival AKR has abolished the seating configurations and replaced them with individual suites totaling 461, each with its own bathroom, capable of accommodating 2000 passengers. There are three levels of vehicle decks capable of accommodating 350 trucks of 10 meters long. In addition, the 5 meter clearance of vehicle decks enable to ship to accommodating bulky equipment. Specification:

- Length: 212 m
- Beam: 28.6 m
- Depth: 15.3 m
- Tonnage: 45000 gross ton
- Speed: 18.8 kt
- Endurance: 5000 nm

| Name (English) | Name (Han 中文) | Tonnage | Commissioned | Status |
|---|---|---|---|---|
| China Revival | 中华复兴 | 45000 gross ton | November 4, 2019 | Active |
