= 195th Combined Arms Brigade =

Brigade of the People's Liberation Army

195th Mechanized Infantry Brigade (2011-17) 195th Heavy Combined Arms Brigade (2017-)
- Active: 2011.11.26 -
- Country: China
- Type: Armored
- Role: OPFOR
- Size: Brigade
- Part of: 81st Group Army
- Garrison/HQ: Yutian, Hebei

Commanders
- Current commander: Senior Colonel Man Guangzhi
- Notable commanders: Xia Minglong; Man Guangzhi

The 195th Heavy Combined Arms Brigade (Chinese: 重型合成第195旅) is a maneuver formation of People's Liberation Army Ground Force which serves as an opposing force unit in exercises.

== History ==
Originally designated the 195th Mechanized Infantry Brigade (Chinese: 机械化步兵第195旅), it was formed on November 26, 2011 from the 1st Armored Division being split. The brigade was then a part of the 65th Army. Since its inception, the brigade was converted to a dedicated opposing force unit.

In late 2013, the brigade was transferred to the control of the Beijing Military Region. From May 2014 to September 2015, the brigade fought 33 simulated battles with other brigades and divisions of the PLA ground force at Zhurihe Combined Arms Tactics Training Center, with 32 wins and 1 loss. In April 2017 the brigade was redesignated as the 195th Heavy Combined Arms Brigade.

== List of maneuvers ==
In exercises, various units represent the friendly "red army" (红军), while the 195th Mechanized Infantry Brigade serves as the opposing "blue army" (蓝军). The 195th has participated in two groups of exercises. "Beijian" (Chinese: 北剑; lit. 'Northern Sword') was a series of maneuvers held by the Beijing Military Region, and its May 2014 iteration was the only simulation lost by the opposing force (the 195th) as of 2016. The other exercises are named "Kuayue" (Chinese: 跨越), which means "to stride over". These first began in 2009.

Maneuver	Time	Friendly Unit	Opposing Force	Winners	Source
Beijian-1405	May 2014	7th Armored Brigade	195th Mechanized Infantry Brigade	Friendly unit	
Kuayue-2014.Zhurihe A	May–June 2014	2nd Armored Brigade	195th Mechanized Infantry Brigade	Opposing force	
Kuayue-2014.Zhurihe B	June 2014	122nd Mechanized Infantry Brigade	195th Mechanized Infantry Brigade	Opposing force	
Kuayue-2014.Zhurihe C	June 2014	58th Mechanized Infantry Brigade	195th Mechanized Infantry Brigade	Opposing force	
Kuayue-2014.Zhurihe D	July 2014	68th Mechanized Infantry Brigade	195th Mechanized Infantry Brigade	Opposing force	
Kuayue-2014.Zhurihe E	July 2014	18th Armored Brigade	195th Mechanized Infantry Brigade	Opposing force	
Kuayue-2014.Zhurihe F	July 2014	56th Motorized Infantry Brigade	195th Mechanized Infantry Brigade	Opposing force	
Kuayue-2015.Zhurihe A	June 2015	3rd Motorized Infantry Brigade	195th Mechanized Infantry Brigade	Opposing force	
Kuayue-2015.Zhurihe B	June 2015	119th Motorized Infantry Brigade	195th Mechanized Infantry Brigade	Opposing force	
Kuayue-2015.Zhurihe C	June–July 2015	80th Motorized Infantry Brigade	195th Mechanized Infantry Brigade	Opposing force	
Kuayue-2015.Zhurihe D	July 2015	82nd Motorized Infantry Brigade	195th Mechanized Infantry Brigade	Opposing force	
Kuayue-2015.Zhurihe E	August 2015	1st Armored Brigade	195th Mechanized Infantry Brigade	Opposing force	
Kuayue-2015.Zhurihe F	August 2015	5th Armored Brigade	195th Mechanized Infantry Brigade	Opposing force	
Kuayue-2015.Zhurihe G	August 2015	12th Armored Brigade	195th Mechanized Infantry Brigade	Opposing force	
Kuayue-2015.Zhurihe H	August–September 2015	42nd Motorized Infantry Brigade	195th Mechanized Infantry Brigade	Opposing force	
Kuayue-2015.Zhurihe I	September 2015	200th Mechanized Infantry Brigade	195th Mechanized Infantry Brigade	Opposing force	
Kuayue-2015.Zhurihe J	September–October 2015	15th Armored Brigade	195th Mechanized Infantry Brigade	Opposing force	
Beijian-1510(S)	October 2015	113th Mechanized Infantry Division	195th Mechanized Infantry Brigade	Opposing force	
Kuayue-2016.Zhurihe A	July 2016	10th Armored Brigade	195th Mechanized Infantry Brigade	Opposing force	
Kuayue-2016.Zhurihe B	July–August 2016	77th Motorized Infantry Brigade	195th Mechanized Infantry Brigade	Opposing force	
Kuayue-2016.Zhurihe C	August 2016	9th Armored Brigade	195th Mechanized Infantry Brigade	Opposing force	
Kuayue-2016.Zhurihe D	September 2016	120th Mountain Motorized Infantry Brigade	195th Mechanized Infantry Brigade	Opposing force	
Kuayue-2016.Zhurihe E	September 2016	196th Motorized Infantry Brigade	195th Mechanized Infantry Brigade	Opposing force	
