= 195th Division (2nd Formation) (People's Republic of China) =

195th Army Division (1969–85)
- Active: 1969.10 - 1985
- Country: People's Republic of China
- Branch: People's Liberation Army
- Type: Division
- Role: Infantry
- Part of: 65th Army Corps

The 195th Army Division (Chinese: 陆军第195师)(2nd Formation) was created in December 1969 basing on the 4th Engineer District, Engineer Troops of Beijing Military Region.

The division was part of 65th Army Corps. By then the division was composed of:

- 583rd Infantry Regiment;
- 584th Infantry Regiment;
- 585th Infantry Regiment;
- Artillery Regiment.

The division was disbanded in 1985 and re-organized as Tank Brigade, 65th Army. In 1998 it renamed as Armored Brigade, 65th Army. In 2003 the brigade was disbanded and replaced by 1st Armored Division.
