= 195th Brigade =

195th Brigade may refer to:

- 195th Combined Arms Brigade, People's Republic of China
- 195th (2/1st Scottish Rifles) Brigade, United Kingdom

== See also ==
- 195th Regiment (disambiguation)
