= 5th Artillery Division =

5th Artillery Division (1952-1985) Artillery Brigade, 24th Army (1985-2003)
- Active: 1952.11 – 2003.11
- Country: People's Republic of China
- Branch: People's Liberation Army Ground Force, People's Volunteer Army
- Type: Artillery
- Size: Brigade
- Part of: 24th Army
- Garrison/HQ: Changli, Hebei

The 5th Artillery Division(Chinese: 炮兵第5师) was activated on October 12, 1952 at Shaoguan, Guangdong. The divisional headquarters was converted from Headquarters, 146th Division.

The division was composed of the 33rd, 34th, 35th, and 50th Artillery Regiments.

In 1953, the 33rd Artillery Regiment detached from the division.

In 1954, the division organized an advisory group of 500 personnel to Vietnam.

From November 1956 to September 1958, the division was deployed to North Korea. 206th Artillery Regiment attached to the division.

Upon returning from North Korea, the division stationed in Changli, Hebei. The division was then composed of:

- 34th Artillery Regiment - 122 mm Gun D-74
- 35th Artillery Regiment - 122 mm Howitzer M-30
- 50th Artillery Regiment - ?
- 206th Artillery Regiment - 132 mm MRL Katyusha

In March 1983, the division attached to the 24th Army Corps.

In September 1985, the division was reduced and reorganized as the Artillery Brigade, 24th Army(Chinese: 第24集团军炮兵旅).

In November 2003, as the disbandment of the 24th Army, the brigade was inactivated and later reconstituted as the Reserve Artillery Brigade of Qinhuangdao(Chinese: 秦皇岛预备役炮兵旅) in May 2005.
