= 13th Air Force Corps =

Former Chinese Air Force unit

13th Air Force Corps (1971-76)
- Active: January 1971–January 1976
- Country: China
- Allegiance: Chinese Communist Party
- Part of: People's Liberation Army Air Force; Beijing Military Region
- Garrison/HQ: Shijiazhuang, Hebei

Commanders
- Notable commanders: Zhu Futian

The 13th Air Force Corps (Chinese: 空军第13军) of the People's Liberation Army Air Force was a military formation. It was activated in January 1971 in Shijiazhuang, Hebei province. The corps commander was Zhu Futian, and its commissar was Fang Zhongying. It was located within the Beijing Military Region for its entire period of service.

From August 1, 1975, the Corps' code-number was 39133. The exact composition of the corps remains unknown.

Known units:

- 17th Aviation Division;
- 3rd Radar Regiment.

The Corps was disbanded in January 1976 or March 1976.
