= 146th Division (1st Formation) (People's Republic of China) =

146th Division (1948–52)
- Active: 1948.11 - 1952.10
- Country: People's Republic of China
- Branch: People's Liberation Army
- Type: Division
- Role: Infantry
- Part of: 49th Corps
- Engagements: Chinese Civil War

The 146th Division (Chinese: 第146师) was created in November 1948 under the Regulation of the Redesignations of All Organizations and Units of the Army, issued by Central Military Commission on November 1, 1948, basing on the 35th Division, 12th Column of the PLA Dongbei Field Army, formed in April 1947.

The division is part of 49th Corps. Under the flag of 146th division it took part in several major battles during the Chinese Civil War. In July 1952 the division was inactivated: the division HQ was converted as HQ, 5th Artillery Division, its 436th and 437th Regiment was transferred to Hainan Military District, and 438th Regiment moved to Korea as a replacement unit.

As of inactivation the division was composed of:

- 436th Regiment;
- 437th Regiment;
- 438th Regiment.
