= 71st Division (2nd Formation) (People's Republic of China) =

71st Army Division (1969-85)
- Active: 1969.10-1985
- Country: People's Republic of China
- Branch: People's Liberation Army
- Type: Division
- Role: Infantry
- Part of: 24th Army Corps

71st Army Division (Chinese: 陆军第71师)(2nd Formation) was formed in October 1969 from 3rd Engineer District of Beijing Military Region, and its designation was formally assigned in December.

The division was a part of 24th Army Corps. From 1969 to 1985, the division was composed of:

- 211th Infantry Regiment
- 212th Infantry Regiment
- 213th Infantry Regiment
- Artillery Regiment.

In 1983, 213th Infantry Regiment was detached from the division and transferred to the People's Armed Police. No evidence shows whether a new 213th Infantry Regiment was formed.

In 1985, the division was disbanded.
