= 77th Motorized Infantry Brigade =

Brigade of the People's Liberation Army

The 77th Division was a military formation of the People's Volunteer Army (a.k.a. Chinese People's Volunteers (CPV) or Chinese Communist Forces (CCF)) during the Korean War.

The division was a component of the 26th Army, consisting of the 229th, 230th, and the 231st Regiments.
