= 72nd Division (People's Republic of China) =

72nd Division (1949–53) 72nd Infantry Division (1953–60) 72nd Army Division (1960-85) 72nd Infantry Division (1985-98) 72nd Reserve Artillery Division (1998-)
- Active: 1949.2 -
- Country: People's Republic of China
- Branch: People's Liberation Army Ground Force, People's Volunteer Army
- Type: Artillery
- Size: Division
- Part of: Hebei Provincial Military District
- Garrison/HQ: Tangshan, Hebei
- Engagements: Chinese Civil War, Korean War

The 72nd Division (Chinese: 第72师) was created in February 1949 under the Regulation of the Redesignations of All Organizations and Units of the Army, issued by Central Military Commission on November 1, 1948, basing on the 18th Division, 6th Column of the Huadong Field Army. Its history can be traced to the 1st Brigade of Suzhong Military District, formed in August 1945.

The division was part of the 24th Corps. Under the flag of the 72nd Division, it took part in several major battles in the Chinese Civil War, including the Huaihai Campaign.

The division was composed of 214th, 215th, and 216th Regiments.

In August 1952, Artillery Regiment, 200th Division was activated, which was later renamed as the 351st Artillery Regiment in 1953. The division then entered Korea with the Corps HQ as a part of People's Volunteer Army. During its deployment in Korea, it took part in the defensive actions in Triangle Hill and Kumsong area.

Zhang Taofang, a soldier from 214th Regiment, claimed 214 confirmed kills with 442 shots in his 32-day deployment with a rifle without the scope.

In 1954 the division pulled out from North Korea and garrisoned in Tangshan, Hebei.

By then the division was composed of:

- 214th Regiment
- 215th Regiment
- 216th Regiment
- 351th Artillery Regiment

In June 1969, 351th Artillery Regiment was renamed the Artillery Regiment, 72nd Army Division.

In September 1985 the division was reconstituted as a northern infantry division, category B.

In June 1999, the division was merged with the Reserve Artillery Division of Tangshan(Chinese: 唐山陆军预备役炮兵师) and reorganized as the 72nd Reserve Artillery Division of Hebei Provincial Military District(Chinese: 河北省军区预备役炮兵第72师), and was transferred to the Hebei PMD's control.

The division was then composed of:

- 214th Artillery Regiment
- 215th Artillery Regiment
- 216th Artillery Regiment
