= 197th Division (People's Republic of China) =

197th Division (1949–52) 197th Infantry Division (1952–60) 197th Army Division (1960–85) 5th Garrison Brigade of Beijing Military Region (1985–92)
- Active: 1949.2 - 1992.10
- Country: People's Republic of China
- Branch: People's Liberation Army, People's Volunteer Army
- Type: Brigade
- Role: Infantry, Garrison
- Part of: 24th Army
- Garrison/HQ: Fengning, Hebei
- Engagements: Chinese Civil War, Korean War

The 197th Army Division, then 5th Garrison Brigade of Beijing Military Region was a military formation of the People's Liberation Army of the People's Republic of China.

The 197th Division (Chinese: 第197师) was created in February 1949 under the Regulation of the Redesignations of All Organizations and Units of the Army, issued by Central Military Commission on November 1, 1948, basing on the 2nd brigade, 1st Column of the Huabei Military Region. Its history could be traced to the 2nd Independent Brigade of Jinchaji Military Region, formed in August 1947.

The division was a part of 66th Corps. Under the flag of 197th division it took part in several major battles during the Chinese Civil War.

In October 1950 the division entered Korea along with the Corps and became a part of the People's Volunteer Army (Chinese People's Volunteers (CPV) or Chinese Communist Forces (CCF)) during the Korean War with a standard strength of approximately 10,000 men. It was a component of the 66th Army, consisting of the 589th, 590th, and 591st Regiments.

In March 1951 the division pulled out from Korea and stationed in Fengning, Hebei.

In 1952 the division renamed as 197th Infantry Division (Chinese: 步兵第197师).

577th Artillery Regiment was activated in 1951. Tank Regiment was activated in September 1951 and renamed as 402nd Tank Self-Propelled Artillery Regiment in September 1953.

As of late 1953 the division was composed of:

- 589th Infantry Regiment;
- 590th Infantry Regiment;
- 591st Infantry Regiment;
- 402nd Tank Self-Propelled Artillery Regiment
- 577th Artillery Regiment.

In January 1957, the division exchanged its subordination with 74th Infantry Division was transferred to 24th Infantry Corps.

In 1960 the division renamed as 197th Army Division (Chinese: 陆军第197师).

In August 1968, 402nd Tank Self-Propelled Artillery Regiment was detached from the division and became 3rd Tank Regiment of 1st Tank Division.

In June 1969 577th Artillery Regiment became Artillery Regiment, 197th Army Division. In October the division returned to 66th Army Corps' control. Since then the division was composed of:

- 589th Infantry Regiment;
- 590th Infantry Regiment;
- 591st Infantry Regiment;
- Artillery Regiment.

In August 1985, following 66th Army Corps' disbandment, the division was reduced and renamed as 5th Garrison Brigade of Beijing Military Region(Chinese: 北京军区守备第5旅) and transferred to 24th Army's control.

In October 1992 the brigade was disbanded.
