= 198th Division (1st Formation) (People's Republic of China) =

198th Division (1949–53) 198th Infantry Division(1953–60) 198th Army Division(1960–61)
- Active: 1949.2 - 1961.5
- Country: People's Republic of China
- Branch: People's Liberation Army, People's Volunteer Army
- Type: Division
- Role: Infantry
- Part of: 66th Corps
- Engagements: Chinese Civil War, Korean War

The 198th Division(Chinese: 第198师) was created in February 1949 under the Regulation of the Redesignations of All Organizations and Units of the Army, issued by Central Military Commission on November 1, 1948, basing on the 3rd Brigade, 1st Column, 3rd Army Group of Huabei Military Region. Its origin could be traced to 4th Independent Brigade of Jicha Military District formed in June 1946.

The division was a component of the 66th Corps. Under the flag of 198th division it took part in the Chinese Civil War. In October 1950 the division entered Korea as a part of People's Volunteer Army with a standard strength of approximately 10,000 men, consisting of the 592nd, 593rd, and 594th Regiments.

In March 1951 the division pulled back from Korea. In September 403rd Tank Self-Propelled Artillery Regiment and 592nd Artillery Regiment were activated and attached to the division.

By 1960 the division was composed of:

- 592nd Infantry Regiment;
- 593rd Infantry Regiment;
- 594th Infantry Regiment;
- 403rd Tank Self-Propelled Artillery Regiment;
- 592nd Artillery Regiment.

In May 1961 the division was disbanded, and the divisional HQ was transferred to the Navy.
