= 70th Motorized Infantry Brigade =

Brigade of the People's Liberation Army

74th Division (1949-52) 74th Infantry Division (1955-60) 74th Army Division (1960-69) 70th Army Division (1969-85) 70th Motorized Infantry Division (1985-2003) 70th Motorized Infantry Brigade (2003-17) 70th Light Combined Arms Brigade (2017-)
- Active: 1949.2 –
- Country: People's Republic of China
- Branch: People's Liberation Army Ground Force, People's Volunteer Army
- Type: Combined Arms
- Size: Brigade
- Part of: 81st Group Army
- Garrison/HQ: Tangshan, Hebei.
- Engagements: World War II, Second Sino-Japanese War, Chinese Civil War, Korean War

The 74th Division (Chinese: 第74师) was created in February 1949 under the Regulation of the Redesignations of All Organizations and Units of the Army, issued by Central Military Commission on November 1, 1948, basing on 20th Division, 7th Column of PLA Huadong Field Army. Its history can be traced to 5th Contingent of New Fourth Army formed in May 1939, which took in several major battles during the Second Sino-Japanese War.

The division was a part of 25th Corps. Under the flag of 74th the division took part in several major battles during the Chinese Civil War.

In July 1952, the division was transferred to 24th Corps after 25th's disbandment and moved into Korea in September as a part of People's Volunteer Army. During its deployment it inflicted 10800 casualties to confronting UN Forces.

The division returned from North Korea in October 1955 and redesignated as the 74th Infantry Division ({zh|步兵第74师}). By then the division was composed of:

- 220th Infantry Regiment;
- 221st Infantry Regiment;
- 222nd Infantry Regiment;
- 352nd Artillery Regiment.

From January 1957, the division was transferred to 66th Corps.

In 1960 the division was renamed as the 74th Army Division (Chinese: 陆军第74师).

From October 1969, the division returned to now 24th Army Corps' control. In December the division was renamed as the 70th Army Division (Chinese: 陆军第70师). All its regiments were redesignated as follows:

- 208th Infantry Regiment (former 220th);
- 209th Infantry Regiment (former 221st);
- 210th Infantry Regiment (former 222nd);
- Artillery Regiment (former 352nd).

In 1985 the division was renamed as the 70th Motorized Infantry Division (Chinese: 摩托化步兵第70师). Tank Regiment and Anti-Aircraft Artillery Regiment were activated. From 1985 to 1998 it maintained as a northern motorized infantry division, catalogue A. By then the division was composed of:

- 208th Motorized Infantry Regiment;
- 209th Motorized Infantry Regiment;
- 210th Motorized Infantry Regiment;
- Tank Regiment (former Tank Regiment, 24th Army Corps);
- Artillery Regiment;
- Anti-Aircraft Artillery Regiment (newly formed).

In 1998 210th Motorized Infantry Regiment was disbanded, and Tank Regiment, 70th Motorized Infantry Division was re-organized and renamed as Armored Regiment, 70th Motorized Infantry Division.

In 2003 the division was reduced and renamed as the 70th Motorized Infantry Brigade (Chinese: 摩托化步兵第70旅) and was transferred to 65th Army after 24th's disbandment.

The brigade is now one of the maneuver brigades of the PLA 65th Army, stationing in Tangshan, Hebei.

In April 2017 the brigade is renamed as the 70th Light Combined Arms Brigade (Chinese: 轻型合成第70旅).
