= Beijing Military Region =

Former military region of China

- Beijing Military Region (highlighted)
- Simplified Chinese: 北京军区
- Traditional Chinese: 北京軍區
Transcriptions
Standard Mandarin
- Hanyu Pinyin: Běijīng Jūnqū

The Beijing Military Region was one of seven military regions for the Chinese People's Liberation Army. From the mid-1980s to 2017, it had administration of all military affairs within Beijing city, Tianjin city, Hebei province, Shanxi province, and Inner Mongolia Autonomous Region. The Region was mainly responsible for defending the People's Republic of China from Mongolia and Russia, and also protected the capital of China, and had the largest number of military personnel of any of the seven regions active from 1985 to 2017. The Region was disbanded and superseded by the Central Theater Command and Northern Theater Command in 2017.

== History ==
The Beijing Military Region traces its lineage to the establishment of the Northwest Military Region in May 1948. It was renamed the Beijing Military Region in 1955, when the Inner Mongolia Military Region was downgraded to a district, and was folded into the Beijing Military Region.

Both the 63rd and 65th Corps/Group Armies were stationed in the Beijing area after returning from the Korean War and remained in the region ever since, becoming Group Armies after 1985. The 13th Air Force Corps was stationed at Shijiazhuang in Hebei Province from 1971 to 1976.

On 26 October 1988 the 17th Air Division was reorganized into the Beijing MR Training Base (serials 6xx2x).

In reductions announced in September 2003, the 24th Group Army (Hebei), and the 63rd Group Army (Shanxi) were both disbanded. About the same time, the 10th Air Corps, also stationed in the region, was disestablished (PLAAF 2010).

The International Institute for Strategic Studies attributed to the command 300,000 personnel in 2006, consisting of three group armies (the 27th Group Army, 38th Group Army, and the 65th Group Army), two armoured divisions, one mechanised infantry division, five motorised divisions, one artillery division, three armoured, seven motorised infantry, four artillery, a total of five various anti-aircraft brigades, and one anti-tank regiment. The command was also augmented by the PLA Beijing Garrison, which consists of the 1st and 3rd guard divisions (Military Police), and the Beijing Garrison Honor Guard Battalion and Color Guard Company, both of which are charged with public duties. The command was also home to the PLA Navy (PLAN) North Sea Fleet.

The last commander was General Song Puxuan (2014–2016). The last political commissar was General Liu Fulian.

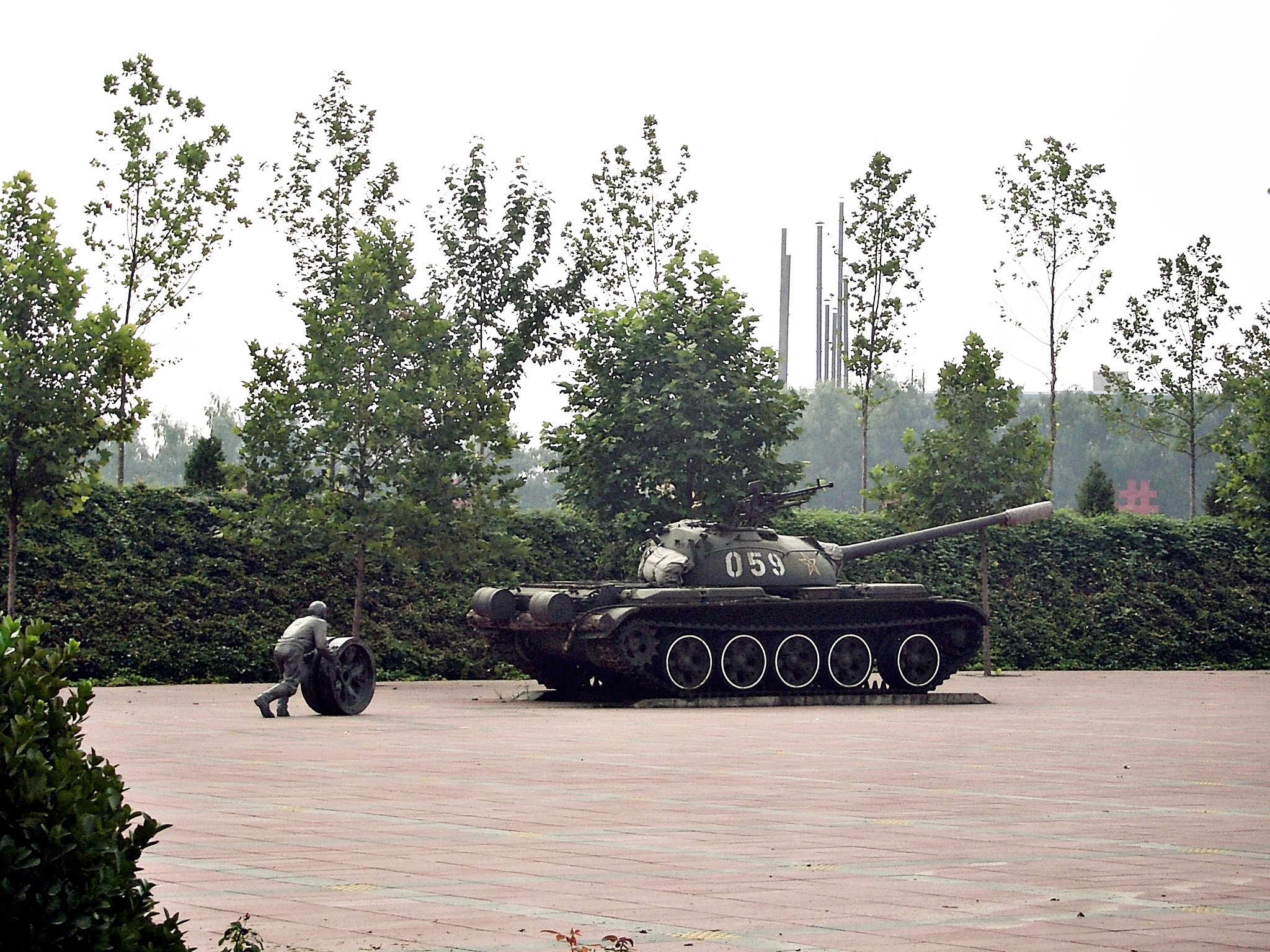
A memorial at the entrance to a military unit in Beijing's Fengtai District

=== Commanders ===
- Yang Chengwu (1955–1958)
- Yang Yong (1958–1963)
- Zheng Weishan (1963–1971)
- Li Desheng (1971–1974)
- Chen Xilian (1974–1980)
- Qin Jiwei (1980–1987)
- Zhou Yibing (1987–1990)
- Wang Chengbin (1990–1993)
- Li Laizhu (1993–1997)
- Li Xinliang (1997–2002)
- Zhu Qi (2002–2007)
- Fang Fenghui (2007–2012)
- Zhang Shibo (2012–2014)
- Song Puxuan (2014–2016)

== Mission ==
The Beijing Military Region was primarily charged with protecting the capital. Because of its location in the capital, the Beijing Military Region was the most important of the seven military regions. Each unit from the Beijing Military Region contributed forces to Beijing for the crackdown on the Tiananmen Square protests of 1989, and these elements remained deployed in Beijing long after using deadly force to remove the demonstrators.

In addition to guarding the capital, the Beijing Military Region was also in charge of training key personnel for leadership positions through the numerous military academies in the region.

== Structure ==
The organizational structure as of 2016 was as follows:

- Leadership
  - Commander
  - Deputy Commanders
  - Regional Chief-of-Staff
  - Political Commissar Fu Tinggui
  - Deputy Political Commissars
  - Political Department Director
- Headquarters Department
  - HQ Battalion

=== Directly subordinated units ===
- 27th Group Army
  - Army HQ
    - Army HQ Battalion
- 38th Group Army
- 65th Group Army

=== PLA Beijing Garrison ===
- 1st Guard Division
  - Beijing Garrison Honor Guard Battalion
- 3rd Guard Division
- 17th Guard Regiment

== Nickname ==
Organizations affiliated with the Beijing Military Region often used the nickname "comrade" (Chinese: 战友; pinyin: zhànyǒu; lit. 'battle friend'), including the Comrade Performance Troupe (Chinese: 战友文工团) and the Comrade Newspaper (Chinese: 战友报).
