= 66th Corps (China) =

The 66th Corps was a military formation of the People's Volunteer Army (Chinese People's Volunteers (CPV) or Chinese Communist Forces (CCF)) XIII Army Group, during the Korean War.

The 66th Corps was composed of the 196th, 197th, and 198th Divisions.

The army was active in the Beijing Military Region until being disbanded in the 1985.
