= 81st Group Army =

Chinese military unit

- 第八十一集团军
- Active: 1949–present
- Country: China
- Allegiance: Chinese Communist Party
- Branch: People's Liberation Army Ground Force
- Type: Group army
- Part of: Central Theater Command Ground Force
- Garrison/HQ: Zhangjiakou, Hebei
- Engagements: Long March; World War II; Chinese Civil War; Korean War

Commanders
- Current commander: Major General Wu Aimin
- Political Commissar: Major General Ma Baochuan

Insignia
- NATO Map Symbol

The 81st Group Army (Chinese: 第八十一集团军; pinyin: Dì Bāshíyī Jítuánjūn), Unit 31675, formerly the 65th Group Army, is a military formation of the Chinese People's Liberation Army Ground Force (PLAGF). The 81st Group Army is one of thirteen total group armies of the PLAGF, the largest echelon of ground forces in the People's Republic of China, and one of three assigned to the nation's Central Theater Command.

== History ==
The 65th Group Army traces its lineage to its original incarnation, the 5th Column of the North China Field Army established sometime around 1946. It was initially composed of three brigades, the 13th, 14th, and 15th. In 1949 the unit was reorganized and redesignated as the 65th Army under the command of Hsiao Ying-t'ang. In 1949 the 65th Army was composed of the 193rd, 194th and 195th Divisions.

The 65th Army was deployed to Korea in 1951. Following the Korean War the 65th Army was redeployed to Hebei in 1953.

In October 1960, the 195th Army Division, except its 575th Artillery Regiment, were transferred to the Engineer Troops and reorganized as 102nd Engineer District Command.

Formed in 1969, the 195th Division (Second Formation) was disbanded in 1985.

In May 1989, the 65th Army’s 193rd and 194th Infantry Divisions along with the 3rd Reserved Division were deployed to Beijing to enforce martial law and suppress the Tiananmen Square protests of 1989.

In 2002, the formation's ID number was changed from 50156 to 66455.

== Organization ==
The 81st Group Army is composed of:

- 7th Heavy Combined Arms Brigade
- 70th Light Combined Arms Brigade
- 162th Medium Combined Arms Brigade
- 189th Medium Combined Arms Brigade
- 194th Heavy Combined Arms Brigade
- 195th Heavy Combined Arms Brigade
- 81st Special Operations Brigade
- 81st Army Aviation Brigade
- 81st Artillery Brigade
- 81st Air Defense Brigade
- 81st Engineering and Chemical Defense Brigade
- 81st Service Support Brigade

== See also ==
- Chinese People's Volunteer Army order of battle
