= Korean War order of battle =

This is the Korean War order of battle. Subsidiary commands are listed on sub-pages. Where no date is shown for a command, assume it present at the start of the war, on June 25, 1950.

== Pro-Southern forces: United Nations and Republic of Korea ==
=== Republic of Korea Armed Forces (prior to June 25, 1950) ===
- Republic of Korea Armed Forces
  - Capital Guard Command, Seoul & Ongjin
    - 3rd Infantry Regiment
    - 8th Infantry Regiment
    - 17th Infantry Regiment
    - 18th Infantry Regiment
    - 1st Cavalry Regiment
  - 1st Infantry Division, Kaesong
    - 11th Infantry Regiment
    - 12th Infantry Regiment
    - 13th Infantry Regiment
  - 2nd Infantry Division, Daejeon
    - 5th Infantry Regiment
    - 16th Infantry Regiment
    - 25th Infantry Regiment
  - 3rd Infantry Division, Daegu
    - 22nd Infantry Regiment
    - 23rd Infantry Regiment
  - 5th Infantry Division, Gwangju
    - 15th Infantry Regiment
    - 20th Infantry Regiment
  - 6th Infantry Division, Chuncheon & Wonju
    - 2nd Infantry Regiment
    - 7th Infantry Regiment
    - 19th Infantry Regiment
  - 7th Infantry Division, Dongducheon
    - 1st Infantry Regiment
    - 3rd Infantry Regiment
    - 9th Infantry Regiment
  - 8th Infantry Division, Gangneung & Jumunjin
    - 10th Infantry Regiment
    - 21st Infantry Regiment
  - 9th Infantry Division, Seoul (from October 1950)
    - 28th Infantry Regiment
    - 29th Infantry Regiment
    - 30th Infantry Regiment

=== United Nations Ground Forces ===
- General Headquarters United Nations Command (UNC) — Formally activated 10 July 1950, before then allied forces were formally under American operational control.
  - Far East Command (FECOM)
    - Eighth Army - Combination of ROK infantry divisions and UN forces
      - I Corps
      - IX Corps
      - X Corps: September 15, 1950 to December 24, 1950.
  - United States ground forces (with attached UN units)
    - 2nd Infantry Division
      - French Battalion
      - Dutch Battalion (from early 1951)
    - 3rd Infantry Division
      - 65th Infantry Regiment (from September 1950)
      - Belgian Battalion (from February 1951)
        - Luxembourg Platoon (from February 1951)
      - Greek Battalion
    - 7th Infantry Division
      - Colombian Battalion
      - Ethiopian "Kagnew" Battalion
    - 24th Infantry Division
    - 25th Infantry Division
      - Turkish Brigade
      - Philippine Expeditionary Forces to Korea
    - 40th Infantry Division
    - 45th Infantry Division
    - 1st Cavalry Division
      - Thai Battalion
    - 187th Airborne Infantry Regiment
    - 5th Infantry Regiment
  - United Nations divisions under overall US command:
    - 27th British Commonwealth Brigade (from August 1950-July 1951)
    - British 28th Infantry Brigade (from April–June 1951)
    - British 29th Infantry Brigade (from November 1950-July 1951)
    - 1st Commonwealth Division (from July 1951)
      - Canadian 25th Brigade
      - Australian Battalions
      - New Zealand Artillery Regiment
  - US Marine Corps
    - 1st Marine Division
      - Provisional Marine Brigade 1950
    - 1st Marine Aircraft Wing
  - Republic of Korea Army
    - ROK I Corps
    - ROK II Corps

=== United Nations Naval Forces ===
- Naval Forces Far East
  - United States Seventh Fleet (from June 27, 1950)
    - Task Force 90
    - Task Force 95 (from September 12, 1950)
    - Task Force 96
  - British Far East Fleet (from June 28, 1950)

=== United Nations Air Forces ===
- US Far East Air Forces
  - 31st Strategic Reconnaissance Squadron (Photographic) (from June 29-November 15, 1950)
  - 91st Strategic Reconnaissance Squadron (Medium, Photographic) (from November 15, 1950)
  - Fifth Air Force
  - Far East Air Forces Bomber Command
  - Twentieth Air Force

=== Other ===
- Swedish Red Cross Field Hospital (Svenska Röda Korset-sjukhuset)
- Indian Army 60th Parachute Field Ambulance
- Danish Red Cross Hospital Ship
- Norwegian Mobile Army Surgical Hospital (NORMASH)
- Italian 68th Red Cross Hospital (L’Ospedale N. 68 della Croce Rossa Italiana)

== Pro-Northern forces: People's Republic of Korea and China ==
=== North Korean forces ===
- Korean People's Army
  - 1st NKPA Division
  - 2nd NKPA Division
  - 3rd NKPA Division
  - 4th NKPA Division
  - 5th NKPA Division
  - 6th NKPA Division
  - 12th NKPA Division
  - 10th NKPA Division
  - 13th NKPA Division
  - 15th NKPA Division
  - 105th Armoured Brigade
  - 206th Mechanized Infantry Brigade

Notes:

- NKPA infantry divisions 1 through 7 were regular force infantry divisions used in the attack on South Korea, while the 10th, 13th, and 15th were reserve units used for security.

=== Chinese forces ===
People's Volunteers Army November 23, 1950

- XIII Army Group - General Deng Hua
  - 38th Army - General Liang Xingchu
    - 112th Division (334th, 335th, 336th Regts)
    - 113th Division (337th, 338th, 339th Regts)
    - 114th Division (340th, 341st, 342d Regts)
  - 39th Army - General Wu Xinquan
    - 115th Division (343d, 344th, 345th Regts)
    - 116th Division (346th, 347th, 348th Regts)
    - 117th Division (349th, 350th, 351st Regts)
  - 40th Army - General Wen Yucheng
    - 118th Division (352d, 353d, 354th Regts)
    - 119th Division (355th, 356th, 357th Regts)
    - 120th Division (358th, 359th, 360th Regts)
  - 42nd Army - General Wu Ruilin
    - 124th Division (370th, 371st, 372d Regts)
    - 125th Division (373d, 374th, 375th Regts)
    - 126th Division (376th, 377th, 378th Regts)
  - 50th Army - General Zeng Zesheng
    - 148th Division (442d, 443d, 444th Regts)
    - 149th Division (445th, 446th, 447th Regts)
    - 150th Division (448th, 449th, 450th Regts)
  - 66th Army - General Xiao Xinhuai
    - 196th Division (586th, 587th, 588th Regts)
    - 197th Division (589th, 590th, 591st Regts)
    - 198th Division (592d, 593d, 594th Regts)
  - 1st Motorised Artillery Division (25th, 26th, 27th Regts)
  - 2nd Motorised Artillery Division (28th, 29th, 30th Regts)
  - 8th Motorised Artillery Division (31st, 44th, 45th Regts)
- IX Army Group - General Song Shi-Lun
  - 20th Army - General Zhang Yixiang
    - 58th Division (172d, 173d, 174th Regts)
    - 59th Division (175th, 176th, 177th Regts)
    - 60th Division (178th, 179th, 180th Regts)
    - 89th Division (265th, 266th, 267th Regts)
  - 26th Army - General Zhang Renchu
    - 76th Division (226th, 227th, 228th Regts)
    - 77th Division (229th, 230th, 231st Regts)
    - 78th Division (232d, 233d, 234th, Regts)
    - 88th Division (262d, 263d, 264th Regts)
  - 27th Army - General Peng Deqing
    - 79th Division (235th, 236th, 237th Regts)
    - 80th Division (238th, 239th, 240th Regts)
    - 81st Division (241st, 242nd, 243d Regts)
    - 90th Div (268th, 269th, 270th Regts)
- III Army Group - General Chen Geng
  - 12th Army - General Zeng Shaoshan
  - 15th Army - General Qin Jiwei
  - 60th Army - General Wei Jie
    - 179th Division
    - 180th Division
    - 181st Division
- XIX Army Group - General Yang Dezhi
  - 63rd Army - General Fu Congbi
  - 64th Army - General Zeng Siyu
  - 65th Army - General Xiao Yingtang

=== Soviet Union ===
- 64th Fighter Aviation Corps

=== Other ===
- Foreign Medical Continents
  - Bulgarian Red Cross
  - Czechoslovak Field Hospital (from 1952)

== See also ==
- US Eighth Army Korean War order of battle
- US Seventh Fleet Korean War order of battle
- USAF units and aircraft of the Korean War

== Sources ==
- Rottman, Gordon L.; Evanhoe, Ed (December 2002). Korean War Order of Battle: United States, United Nations, and Communist Ground, Naval, and Air Forces, 1950-1953. Greenwood Publishing Group, Incorporated. ISBN 978-0-275-97835-8.
- Mossman, Billy C. (1990). UNITED STATES ARMY IN THE KOREAN WAR EBB AND FLOW NOVEMBER 1950-JULY 1951. WASHINGTON, D.C.: United States Army Center of Military History. Archived from the original on 2021-01-29.
