= Second Phase Offensive =

Part of the Korean War

Second Phase Campaign
- Part of the Korean War
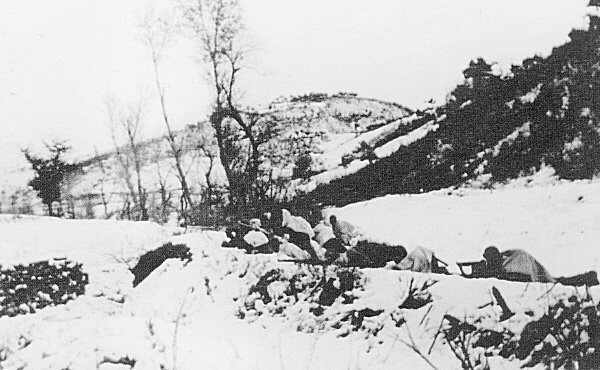
- Chinese soldiers setting up an ambush, late 1950.
Date	25 November – 24 December 1950
Location	North Korea
Result	Chinese victory
Territorial changes	Expulsion of UN forces from North Korea

Belligerents
United Nations (UNC): United States; South Korea; Turkey; United Kingdom	China; North Korea

Commanders and leaders
(United Nations) Douglas MacArthur (United States) Walton H. Walker (United States) Edward Almond (United States) Oliver P. Smith	(China) Peng Dehuai (China) Han Xianchu (China) Song Shilun

Units involved
(United States) Eighth Army; (United States) I Corps; (United States) 1st Cavalry Division; (United States) 24th Infantry Division; (First Republic of Korea) 1st Infantry Division; (United Kingdom) 27th Commonwealth Brigade; (United Kingdom) 29th Independent Infantry Brigade; (United States) IX Corps; (United States) 2nd Infantry Division; (United States) 25th Infantry Division; (Turkey) 1st Turkish Armed Forces Command; (First Republic of Korea) Republic of Korea Army; I Corps; 3rd Infantry Division; Capital Division; II Corps; 6th Infantry Division; 7th Infantry Division; 8th Infantry Division; (United States) Fifth Air Force; (United States) X Corps; 1st Marine Division; 3rd Infantry Division; 7th Infantry Division; 1st Marine Air Wing	(China) People's Volunteer Army; 20th Army; 58th Division; 59th Division; 60th Division; 89th Division; 26th Army; 76th Division; 77th Division; 78th Division; 88th Division; 27th Army; 79th Division; 80th Division; 81st Division; 94th Division; 38th Army; 112th Division; 113th Division; 114th Division; 39th Army; 115th Division; 116th Division; 117th Division; 40th Army; 118th Division; 119th Division; 120th Division; 42nd Army; 124th Division; 125th Division; 126th Division; 50th Army; 148th Division; 149th Division; 150th Division; 66th Army; 196th Division; 197th Division; 198th Division

Strength
358,091	300,000–390,000

Casualties and losses
US: 24,000 casualties (including 4,538 killed); ROK: 12,000 (Chinese estimate) Total: 36,000 casualties	30,000 battle casualties (including 9,549 killed); 50,000 non-battle casualties. (Note: Among the CPVF casualties in the Second Phase Campaign were 50,000 non-combat deaths.) Total: 80,000 casualties

The Second Phase Offensive (25 November – 24 December 1950) or Second Phase Campaign (Chinese: 第二次战役; pinyin: Dìèr Cì Zhànyì) of the Korean War was an offensive by the Chinese People's Volunteer Army (PVA) against United Nations Command (U.S./UN) forces, most of which were soldiers of South Korea and the United States. The two major engagements of the campaign were the Battle of the Ch'ongch'on River in the western part of North Korea and the Battle of Chosin Reservoir in the eastern part of North Korea.

Casualties were heavy on both sides. The battles were fought in temperatures as low as −30 °C (−22 °F) and casualties from frostbite may have exceeded those from battle wounds. On 23 December 1950 Lieutenant General Walton Walker died in a vehicle accident in Seoul while in command of the U.S. 8th Army. He was the highest ranked U.S. military service member killed in the Korean War.

U.S. intelligence and air reconnaissance failed to detect the large numbers of Chinese soldiers present in North Korea. Thus, the UN units, the Eighth United States Army on the west and the X Corps on the east, kicked off the "Home-by-Christmas" offensive on 24 November with "unwarranted confidence...believing that they comfortably outnumbered enemy forces." The Chinese attacks came as a surprise. The Home-by-Christmas offensive, with the objective of conquering all of North Korea and ending the war, was quickly abandoned in light of the massive Chinese assault.

The Second Phase Offensive forced all UN forces to go on the defensive and retreat. China had recaptured nearly all of North Korea by the end of the offensive.

== Background ==
In late 1950, the United Nations military forces, led by the United States, advanced rapidly north through South Korea with only light resistance from the retreating North Korean Korean People's Army (KPA). On 1 October 1950, UN Commander General Douglas MacArthur called on North Korea to surrender. There was no response. On 3 October MacArthur announced that UN forces had crossed the border into North Korea. The UN forces proceeded northward toward the Yalu River, the boundary between North Korea and China. On 24 November a final UN offensive, informally called the "Home-by-Christmas Offensive", to complete the conquest of North Korea began. Most of North Korea was then occupied by UN forces, and the Korean War seemed to be almost over. The UN soldiers and their leaders were optimistic that the Korean War could be concluded by Christmas, 25 December.

Despite some indications that substantial numbers of Chinese soldiers were in North Korea, MacArthur played down both the estimates of numbers of Chinese soldiers in North Korea and the possibility of large-scale Chinese intervention. A U.S. military intelligence report dated 25 November estimated that the total number of Chinese soldiers in North Korea was only 70,000. That same date the PVA launched the Second Phase Offensive with 300,000 men or more.

In early October 1950, after reports that UN forces were crossing the border into North Korea, Chinese leader Mao Zedong notified Soviet Union leader Joseph Stalin that "We have decided to send troops into Korea...to fight the United States...this is necessary because, should the Americans occupy the whole of Korea, the Korean revolutionary force would be completely destroyed and the American invaders would become more rampant." Mao said that China would infiltrate 12 infantry divisions into North Korea and that another 24 infantry divisions were present in northern China (Manchuria) for deployment if necessary. A Chinese infantry division when fully staffed numbered about 10,000 men. Mao also appealed for Soviet military assistance for artillery and air power. Mao said that to defeat the UN forces, China would have to have manpower "four times larger than the enemy's."

=== Infiltration and opening shots ===
On 19 October, tens of thousands of Chinese soldiers began crossing the Yalu River, the border between China and North Korea, at night to avoid detection by UN reconnaissance aircraft. Their entry was undetected. On 25 October the first shots fired between the PVA and UN forces were at the Battle of Onjong, about 85 kilometres (53 mi) south of the Yalu. This battle heralded the opening of what China called the First Phase Offensive which would last until 6 November. Peng Dehuai, the Chinese commander, ended the First Phase Offensive because his soldiers were tired and lacked food and munitions. He also said the Chinese soldiers were fearful of UN air raids and that the cold winter weather would make it "increasingly difficult to preserve the strength of our troops who have to sleep outside and sometimes in the snow." Nevertheless, Peng reported that the results of the First Phase Offensive were satisfactory.

=== Chinese appraisal of UN forces ===
After the encounter between PVA and UN forces in the First Phase Offensive, Peng evaluated his opponent. He said that the American artillery and air power were well coordinated and "a great hazard." The American logistics system was "great" and that American infantry had more firepower and range than did the Chinese. He was not complimentary about the American infantryman. "They depend on their planes, tanks, and artillery...they are afraid of our firepower...they specialize in day fighting. They are not familiar with night fighting or hand to hand combat...They are afraid when their rear is cut off. When transportation comes to a standstill, the infantry loses the will to fight." Peng would later say, however, that U.S. soldiers "were good at fighting."

The Chinese commanders believed that the UN's dependence upon technology could be detrimental to them. The UN forces traveled by roads, they needed a constant supply of artillery supplies; and the infantry operated only during daylight hours and depended upon air cover.

=== Chinese strategy and tactics ===
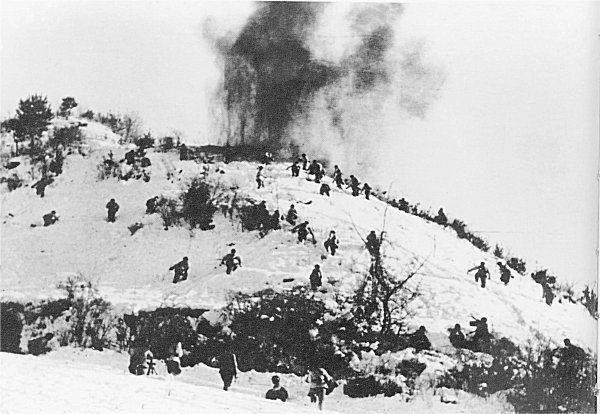
Chinese advance on a U.S./UN position. "Contrary to popular belief the Chinese did not attack in 'human waves', but in compact combat groups of 50 to 100 men".

Peng's strategy for the Second Phase Offensive was to lure the UN forces into advancing northward into a trap with Chinese forces on all sides of them. That strategy would shorten the supply lines of the logistics-challenged Chinese forces and disperse the UN advancing forces. The Chinese would be familiar with the territory and the UN transportation and supply lifelines would be longer and more vulnerable to attack by guerrillas. Peng reasoned that if the PVA forces could destroy two or three UN divisions, the character of the war would change to the benefit of China and North Korea.

The Chinese strategy was dictated in part by their lack of air power, armor, and heavy artillery. After the First Phase Offensive ended on 6 November, Peng ordered the PVA to retreat, feigning weakness and intimidation. However, both the eastern and western branches of the UN forces advanced only slowly. To induce over-confidence by the UN forces, on 18 November Peng released 103 prisoners of war (POW) (including 30 Americans) whom he had ensured would take back to the UN the false information that the PVA were suffering from shortages of food and ammunition and withdrawing to China. These ruses seemed to work as the UN advance sped up.

Peng outlined what would be the Chinese tactics in the Second Phase Offensive. "As a main objective, one of the units must fight its way rapidly around the enemy and cut off their rear....Route of attack must avoid highways and flat terrain in order to keep tanks and artillery from hindering the attack operations...Night warfare in mountainous terrain must have a definite plan and liaison between platoon commands."

To get to the battlefield, PVA soldiers walked from Manchuria to North Korea, evading detection by UN reconnaissance aircraft. One of their armies of three divisions walked 286 miles (460 km) in 16 to 19 days, an average of up to 18 miles (29 km) daily through mountainous terrain and on poor roads and trails. Marching was at night to avoid aerial surveillance. During the day, the soldiers remained stationary and camouflaged themselves. Scouting parties were sent out ahead during the day, but were ordered to halt and remain motionless if aircraft appeared. The PVA soldiers were ill-prepared to march and fight in the sub-zero cold of North Korea. Many of the soldiers were from sub-tropical southeastern China and were unaccustomed to cold weather. In one division, an officer said that 700 men died of frostbite during their first week in Korea, even before the beginning of the offensive. Thus, the loss of soldiers en route to the battlefields was high. Uniforms were inadequate, few had gloves, relying on the long sleeves of their quilted uniforms to protect their hands; their footwear was made of rubber and canvas, offering little protection from the cold. Most soldiers slept on the ground as they had no tents. Weapons were in short supply. Some regiments of 2,000 to 3,000 men had only 800 firearms. Soldiers without firearms were armed with hand grenades. The Chinese armies left most of their artillery behind, and what remained was carried by pack animal. Communications were poor, with bugles, whistles, and runners the only means of communication below the battalion level. Food was in short supply and soldiers were often near-starving.

Nine Chinese armies and 30 divisions were in North Korea when the Second Phase Offensive began. The total number of PVA soldiers has been estimated at upwards of 300,000. Few KPA soldiers were involved in the offensive. Eighteen divisions were allocated for the western offensive, the Battle of the Ch'ongch'on River, and 12 divisions were allocated for the eastern offensive, the Battle of Chosin Reservoir.

=== UN forces and strategy ===
The UN military forces consisted of two components, the Eighth United States Army on the western side of the Korean peninsula and X Corps on the eastern side. The rugged Nangnim Mountains and Taebaek Mountains and a "worrisome" 70 kilometres (43 mi) gap separated the two components.

On 24 November 1950, the Eighth Army occupied a line about 110 kilometres (68 mi) long stretching west to east from the Yellow Sea across the broad coastal plain of the Ch'ongch'on River to the ridges of the Taebaek Mountains. The Eighth Army charged with carrying out the Home for Christmas offensive consisted of four U.S. infantry divisions, eight Republic of Korea Army (ROK) divisions, Turkish and British brigades and a number of smaller units of the United States and several other countries. The U.S. divisions occupied the western section of the line, a mostly flat area, while the ROK occupied the hilly and mountainous eastern section of the line.

Although less numerous than the PVA who may have numbered as many as 240,000 soldiers, the 130,000 front-line soldiers of the Eighth Army "with modern communications, ample artillery support, tanks and backed by adequate logistic support" were "not significantly inferior in terms of combat power to the much more numerous but primitive Chinese." However, the ROK divisions on the right side of the UN line were notably inferior to U.S. divisions, having fewer men and less artillery and having suffered heavy casualties during the First Phase Offensive. The replacements for those casualties were largely new recruits.

UN forces in X Corps comprised five infantry divisions: the U.S. 1st Marine Division, the U.S. 3rd and 7th Infantry Divisions and two ROK divisions, altogether along with attached units totaling about 90,000 men. They would face PVA armies numbering up to 150,000. The U.S. Army and ROK divisions were primarily blocking roads and advancing with little resistance in northeastern North Korea and protecting the important supply ports of Wonsan and Hungnam. One element of the 7th Division had already reached the Yalu River by 24 November, the starting date of the Home-by-Christmas offensive.

The Chinese offensive in the east was directed primarily against the Chosin Reservoir (called Changjin in Korean) targeting the 1st Marine Division, located west and south of the Reservoir and U.S. army units named Task Force Faith, east of the Reservoir. The UN plan was for the Marines to push westward from Chosin Reservoir across the mountains to hook up with the advancing Eighth Army and close the gap between the two components of the UN offensive.

In the days leading up to the start of the Chinese Second Phase Offensive, both 8th Army Commander General Walton Walker and U.S. 1st Marine Division Commander General Oliver P. Smith were wary of advancing as rapidly as MacArthur's headquarters in Japan urged them to do. Smith, in particular, had resisted the exhortations by X Corps commander General Edward Almond to move forward more quickly. Smith ensured that his Marine units were consolidated and mutually supportive. On the west, Walker was also warning his troops of the dangers of advancing carelessly against what seemed to many like an enemy of inferior numbers in a defensive posture.

== Offensive ==
=== The Chinese strike ===
The Second Phase Offensive began when the Chinese attacked the Eighth Army on 25 November. "Rarely has so large an army had such an element of surprise against its adversary. The Americans on the west coast...were essentially blind to the trap they had walked into," said author David Halberstam.

The Chinese recognized that the ROK divisions on the right (eastern) flank of the UN line were the most vulnerable units and occupied difficult, mountainous terrain. By the next morning, the ROK units were shattered and in retreat and the advance of U.S. armies halted. By 1 December the Eighth Army had retreated about 30 kilometres (19 mi) and attempted to establish a new defense line. The U.S. 2nd Infantry Division was already rendered ineffective, having suffered about 4,500 casualties. The number of ROK casualties is unknown but they were heavy. On 2 December, Walker ordered the retreat to continue which it did until 23 December and the PVA attacks ceased and the Second Phase Offensive ended. By then, the Eighth Army had retreated to near the border of South and North Korea in what the soldiers called the "big bugout."

The Chinese attacked the UN forces on both sides of Chosin Reservoir on 27 November. The 1st Marines retreated in good order to Hungnam, albeit suffering heavy casualties. However, two-thirds of the 3,200 soldiers of Task Force Faith on the eastern side of Chosin Reservoir were killed, wounded, or captured. All X Corps' soldiers were evacuated from North Korea by 25 December. The evacuation of X Corps and the retreat of the Eighth Army ended the UN attempt to conquer North Korea.

=== Weather ===
Few battles have ever been fought under worse weather conditions than the Battle of Chosin Reservoir. All of North Korea is frigid in winter, but the cold was most intense for both the Chinese and the UN soldiers in the highlands around Chosin Reservoir. The average daily low for December at Chosin, elevation 1,081 metres (3,547 ft), is −17 °C (1 °F). By contrast the December average low for Hungnam 54 kilometres (34 mi) south at near sea level in elevation is a relatively balmy −5 °C (23 °F). It was an exceptionally cold winter and estimates of the coldest temperatures encountered on the battlefield vary, but they were probably around −30 °C (−22 °F). Casualties among both UN and PVA troops caused by frostbite were as numerous as those caused by combat. In U.S. Marine Corps lore, the battle is often referred to as "Frozen Chosin."

=== Casualties ===
The PVA suffered about 30,700 casualties from battles and 50,000 from non-battle causes, mostly frostbite. for a total of 80,000 casualties in the Second Phase Offensive, roughly 25 percent of their total force. 30,000 casualties were attributed to combat and 50,000 to noncombat casualties, especially frostbite. Losses in the Ch'ongch'on battle were about 10,000 from combat and 20,000 from other causes. PVA losses at the Chosin battle were about 20,000 from combat and 30,000 from non-combat.

The Chinese claimed to have inflicted 36,000 casualties, including 24,000 Americans, on UN forces. This claim is fairly consistent with U.S. estimates of 29,000 UN casualties, 11,000 at the Ch'ongch'on battle and 18,000 at the Chosin Battle, which include almost 8,000 noncombat casualties, mostly frostbite. Records, however, of the Ch'ongch'on battle are incomplete, especially for the ROK forces in the battle.

== Aftermath ==
On 28 November 1950, shortly after the onset of the Chinese Second Phase Offensive, MacArthur cabled the U.S. government in Washington that, "We face an entirely new war." The reversal of fortunes in the Korea War was a shock to the military and political leaders of the United States. The U.S. contemplated that it might have to withdraw its military forces from Korea. Immediately given up was the idea that the two Koreas could be united into a single pro-U.S./UN country. The successful evacuation of UN forces by Christmas from Chosin bolstered U.S. confidence, but in a directive to MacArthur on 29 December 1950, the Joint Chiefs of Staff in Washington, instructed MacArthur to "resist aggression" but added that "Korea is not the place to fight a major war." MacArthur was told "to defend...inflicting such damage to hostile forces in Korea as is possible, subject to the primary consideration of the safety of your troops."

The Chinese were pleased with the outcome of their Second Phase Offensive, having regained nearly all of North Korea from UN forces. However, the Chinese victory created the opinion among Chinese leaders that "we can defeat American armed forces." As a consequence of this confidence, the Chinese soon launched offensives into South Korea that would be turned back by the UN. By early 1951, the Korean War had turned into a stalemate and China had given up carrying out large-scale offensives.
