= Battle of the Ch'ongch'on River =

Part of the Korean War

- Part of the Korean War
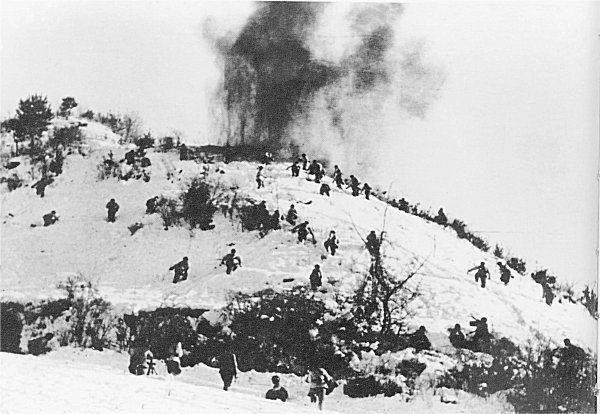
- Chinese forces overrun a UN position.
Date	November 25 – December 2, 1950
Location	Ch'ongch'on River, North Korea 39.71°N 125.84°E
Result	Chinese victory
Territorial changes	South Korean and UN forces withdraw/retreat to Seoul and Inchon, KPA regains control of all areas north of the 38th Parallel

Belligerents
United Nations: United States; Turkey; United Kingdom; South Korea	China

Commanders and leaders
(United Nations) Douglas MacArthur (United States) Walton H. Walker (United States) John B. Coulter (United States) Laurence B. Keiser (First Republic of Korea) Yu Jae-hung (First Republic of Korea) Paik Sun-yup (Turkey) Tahsin Yazıcı (United Kingdom) Basil Aubrey Coad	(China) Mao Zedong (China) Peng Dehuai (China) Han Xianchu

Units involved
(United States) I Corps: 1st Cavalry Division; 1st ROK Infantry Division; 24th Infantry Division; (United States) IX Corps: 2nd Infantry Division; 25th Infantry Division; (United Kingdom) 27th Commonwealth Brigade; (Turkey) Turkish Brigade; (First Republic of Korea) II Corps: 6th ROK Infantry Division; 7th ROK Infantry Division; 8th ROK Infantry Division; (United States) US Fifth Air Force	38th Corps: 112th Division; 113th Division; 114th Division; 39th Corps: 115th Division; 116th Division; 117th Division; 40th Corps: 118th Division; 119th Division; 120th Division; 42nd Corps: 124th Division; 125th Division; 126th Division; 50th Corps: 148th Division; 149th Division; 150th Division; 66th Corps: 196th Division; 197th Division; 198th Division

Strength
254,571	230,000

Casualties and losses
Total: 11,000+ Chinese estimation: 23,000 (United States) 676 killed 3,034 wounded 2,055 captured (Note: These are the total U.S. Army casualty numbers between November 25, 1950 and December 15, 1950, minus the numbers from the 3rd and the 7th Infantry Divisions at the Chosin Reservoir. See Ecker 2005, p. 62.); 743 missing (Turkey) 218 killed 455 wounded 94 missing	Total: (China) 45,000; Chinese estimation: 20,000 battle casualties
- Location within North Korea

The Battle of the Ch'ongch'on River (Chinese: 清川江战役; pinyin: Qīngchuānjiāng Zhànyì), also known as the Battle of the Ch'ongch'on, was a battle in the Korean War that took place from November 25 to December 2, 1950, along the Ch'ongch'on River Valley in the northwestern part of North Korea. In response to the successful Chinese First Phase Offensive against the United Nations (UN) forces, General Douglas MacArthur launched the Home-by-Christmas Offensive to expel the Chinese forces from Korea and to end the war. Anticipating this reaction, the Chinese People's Volunteer Army (PVA) Commander Peng Dehuai planned a counteroffensive, dubbed the "Second Phase Campaign", against the advancing UN forces.

Hoping to repeat the success of the earlier First Phase Campaign, the PVA 13th Army (Note: In Chinese military nomenclature, the term "Army" (军) means Corps, while the term "Army Group" (集团军) means Army.) first launched a series of surprise attacks along the Ch'ongch'on River Valley on the night of November 25, 1950, at the western half of the Second Phase Campaign (Note: The eastern half of the offensive was the Battle of Chosin Reservoir.) (Chinese: 第二次战役西线; pinyin: Dì'èrcì Zhànyì Xīxiàn), effectively destroying the Eighth United States Army's right flank, while allowing PVA forces to move rapidly into UN rear areas. In the subsequent battles and withdrawals from November 26 to December 2, 1950, although the Eighth Army managed to avoid being surrounded by PVA forces, the PVA 8th Army were still able to inflict heavy losses onto the retreating UN forces, which had lost all cohesion. In the aftermath of the battle, the Eighth Army's heavy losses forced all UN forces to retreat from North Korea to the 38th Parallel.

== Background ==
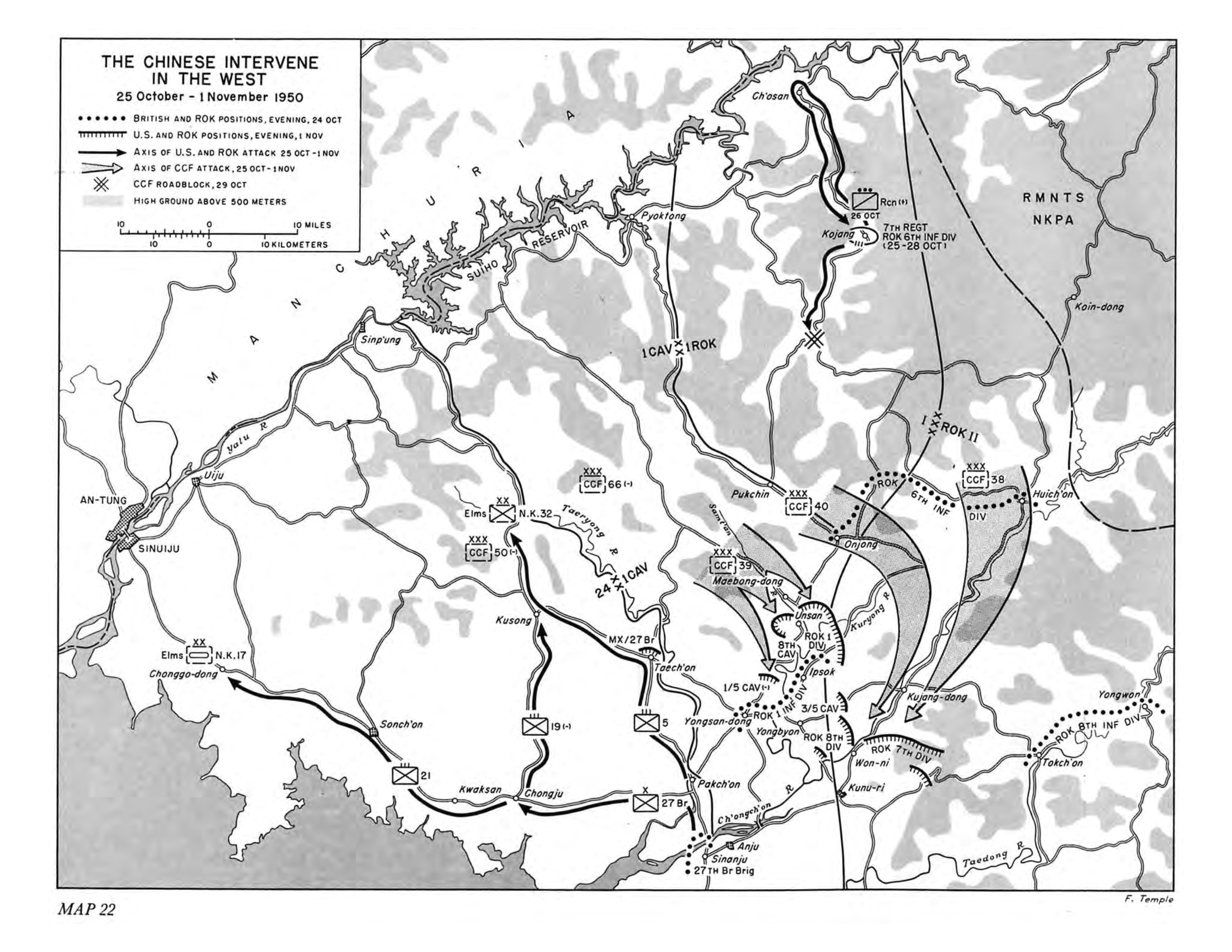
Map of Chinese First Phase Campaign, October 25 – November 1, 1950

Well, if they go fast enough, maybe some of them can be home by Christmas.

— General Douglas MacArthur

In the wake of the UN forces' successful landing at Inchon, the breakout from the Pusan Perimeter and the subsequent destruction of the Korean People's Army (KPA) during September 1950, the Eighth United States Army crossed the 38th Parallel and advanced rapidly towards the Sino-Korean border. Alarmed by this development, Chinese Communist Party chairman Mao Zedong ordered the PVA to intervene in Korea and to launch the First Phase Offensive against the UN forces.

Between October 25 and November 4, 1950, the PVA 13th Army Group surprised and defeated the Republic of Korea Army (ROKA) II Corps and the US 1st Cavalry Division in a series of battles around Onjong and Unsan, destroying the right flank of the US Eighth Army while forcing the UN forces to retreat back to the Ch'ongch'on River. Although PVA forces were able to break through the UN line, logistics difficulties forced the PVA to withdraw on November 5, 1950.

Despite the success of the PVA First Phase Campaign, the UN planners still believed that China had not intervened in Korea on a large scale. The suddenness of the PVA withdrawal in the face of a victory further reinforced this belief. Working on the assumption that only 30,000 PVA troops could remain hidden in the hills, General Douglas MacArthur ordered the bombing of the bridges over the Yalu River in an effort to cut off PVA reinforcements. Confident that the UN air forces could detect and disrupt any troop movements across the Yalu River, MacArthur launched the Home-by-Christmas Offensive on November 24 to rout the remaining PVA and KPA forces and to end the Korean War.

Unknown to the UN planners, however, there were already 180,000 PVA troops stationed in Korea, with more reinforcements infiltrating across the border. Although the PVA was ordered to maintain a defensive posture in North Korea until Soviet weapons could arrive in the spring of 1951, its earlier successes convinced the Chinese leadership that the PVA was capable of turning the tide of UN advance. Encouraged by the fact that the UN did not know their true numbers, PVA Commander Peng Dehuai outlined the Second Phase Campaign, a counteroffensive aimed at pushing the UN forces back to a line halfway between Ch'ongch'on River and Pyongyang. As a part of a deception plan to further reinforce the weak appearance of PVA forces, Peng ordered all units to rapidly retreat north while releasing POWs along the way. With 230,000 troops at his disposal and another 150,000 heading to the Chosin Reservoir, Peng authorized the start of the Second Phase Campaign on November 22, 1950.

== Prelude ==
=== Location, terrain and weather ===
The battle was fought along the UN front line around the Ch'ongch'on River and its tributaries, which is located 50 mi (80 km) south of the Sino-Korean border. The UN front line stretched from the Korean west coast to the Taebaek Mountains in central Korea, while the Ch'ongch'on River crosses into the north of the UN line at the town of Kujang-dong (39.865°N 126.0316°E). From west to east, a series of towns, such as Chongju, Yongsan-dong (39.8266°N 125.69°E), Ipsok (39.8866°N 125.8156°E), Kujang-dong, Tokchon, and Yongwon dot the front line, and connecting those towns are a series of road junctions located at Sinanju, Anju, Kunu-ri and Pukchang-ni. A road runs south from Kunu-ri into Sunchon and eventually into Pyongyang, and it would later become the main retreat route for the UN forces stationed at the center of the front line. The hilly terrain on the northern bank of the Ch'ongch'on River formed a defensive barrier that allowed the Chinese to hide their presence while dispersing the advancing UN forces. The battle was also fought during one of the coldest Korean winters in 100 years, with temperatures dropping to as low as −30 °F (−34 °C).

=== Forces and strategies ===
Acting on MacArthur's instructions, General Walton Walker's Eighth Army started the Home-by-Christmas Offensive at 10:00 on November 24, 1950. With a reconstituted ROKA II Corps placed on the Eighth Army's right flank, the advance was led by the US I Corps to the west, the US IX Corps in the center, and the ROKA II Corps to the east. The three corps advanced cautiously in a continuous front line in order to avoid more ambushes similar to the PVA First Phase Campaign, but the lack of manpower stretched the UN forces to the limit. Except for the strong PVA resistance against ROK II Corps, the Eighth Army met little opposition, and the line between Chongju to Yongwon was occupied on the night of November 25.

Despite the lack of manpower, the US Eighth Army had three and half times the firepower of the opposing PVA/KPA forces. The US Fifth Air Force, which was responsible for air support, also had little opposition due to the lack of anti-aircraft weapons by the PVA and KPA. Boosted by a Thanksgiving feast with roasted turkeys on the eve of the advance, morale was high among the UN ranks, and "home by Christmas" and "Germany by spring" was within reach. However, the high morale resulted in a degradation of troop discipline, and many units had discarded excess equipment and ammunition before the battle. One rifle company from the US IX Corps, for example, started its advance with most of their helmets and bayonets thrown away, and with less than one grenade and 50 rounds of ammunition on average carried per man. Because the UN planners did not foresee that the war would be dragged into a winter campaign, all elements of the Eighth Army started the offensive with a shortage of winter clothing.

"As a main objective, one of the units must fight its way rapidly around the enemy and cut off their rear.... Route of attack must avoid highways and flat terrain in order to keep tanks and artillery from hindering the attack operations.... Night warfare in mountainous terrain must have a definite plan and liaison between platoon commands. Small leading patrol groups attack and then sound the bugle. A large number will at that time follow in column."
Chinese operation principles for the Second Phase Campaign

While the Eighth Army was advancing towards the Yalu River, the PVA 13th Army was hiding in the mountains with the 50th and 66th Corps to the west, the 39th and the 40th Corps in the center, and the 38th and 42nd Corps to the east. Anticipating the UN advances, the PVA planned a series of counterattacks to catch the Eighth Army off guard. Hoping to repeat the success of the earlier First Phase Campaign, the 38th and 42nd Corps would first attack ROKA II Corps and destroy the UN right flank, then cut behind the UN lines. At the same time, the 39th and 40th Corps would hold US IX Corps in place while preventing any reinforcements to ROKA II Corps. The 50th and 66th Corps would stay behind and check the advances of the US I Corps.

Although the PVA 13th Army had a nominal strength of 230,000 men, its actual strength during the battle was as low as 150,000 men. The PVA 66th Corps, for example, had only 6,600 men per division at the start of the battle, as opposed to the authorized full strength of 10,000 men per division. There was also only one firearm available for every three soldiers, and the rest were employed as grenade throwers. Because the majority of the PVA's howitzers and other artillery were left behind in Manchuria, most PVA units only had mortars available as artillery support. For the counteroffensive, the average soldier was issued with only five days worth of rations and ammunition, and resupply could only be obtained by scavenging on the battlefield. To compensate for its shortcomings, the PVA relied extensively on night attacks and infiltrations in order to avoid UN air support. The primitive logistics system had also allowed the PVA to maneuver over the rough hilly terrains, thus enabled them to by-pass the UN defenses and to surround the isolated UN positions. Because the Chinese had captured large numbers of Nationalist weapons during the Chinese Civil War, most of the PVA men used US-made small arms such as the Thompson submachine gun, the M1 Garand rifle, the M1918 Browning Automatic Rifle, the bazooka and the M2 mortar.

== Battle ==
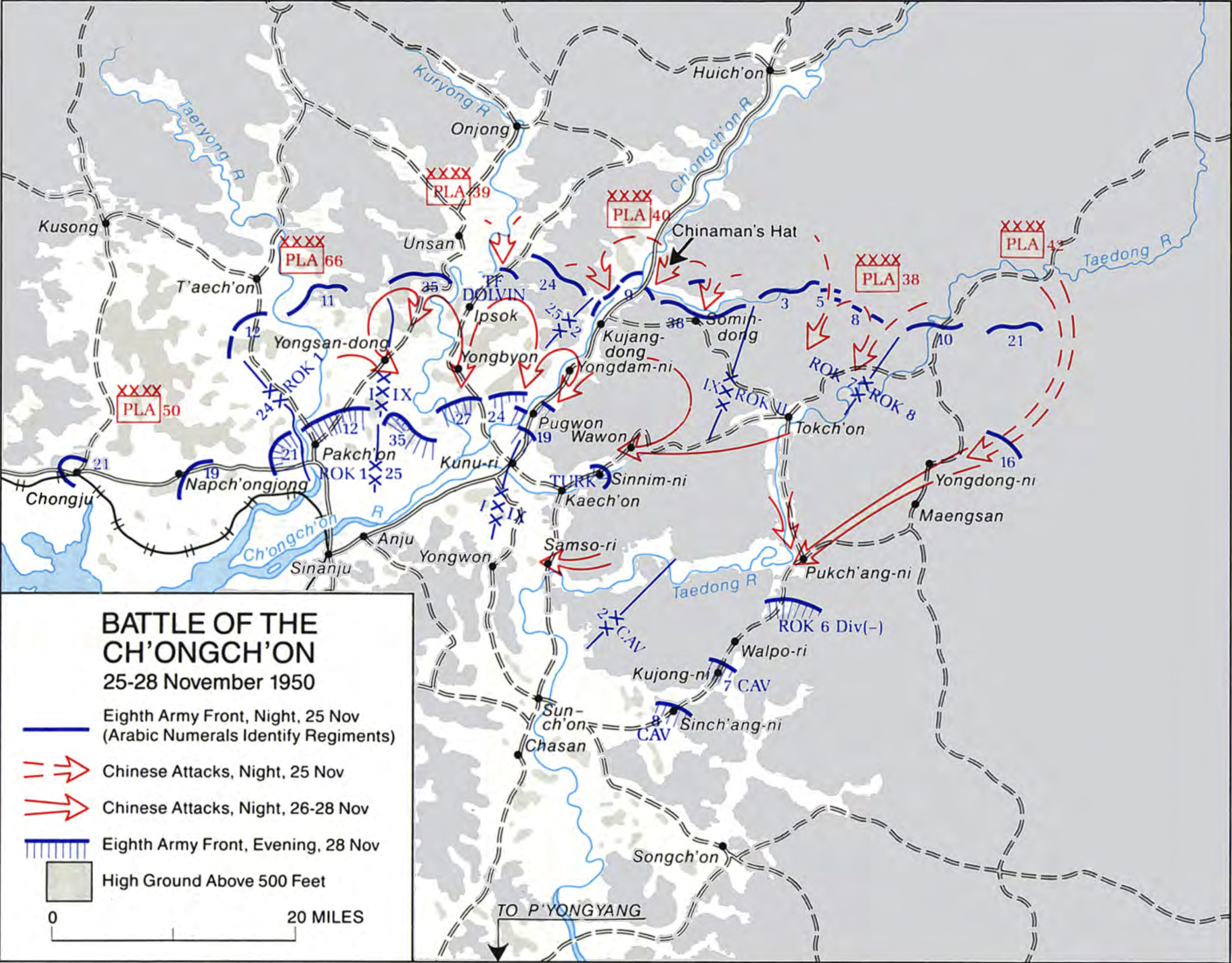
Map of Battle of the Ch'ongch'on River, November 25–28, 1950

As the US Eighth Army stopped its advance on the afternoon of November 25, 1950, the PVA 13th Army commenced the Second Phase Campaign. A massive frontal attack was launched against the entire ROKA/UN line from Yongsan-dong to Yongdong-ni (39.706°N 126.535°E). To the west, the ROKA 1st Infantry Division of US I Corps was attacked by the PVA 66th Corps at Yongsan-dong. In the center, strong probing actions by the PVA 39th and 40th Corps were carried out against US IX Corps at Ipsok and Kujang-dong. In the east, the PVA 38th and 42nd Corps broke through ROKA II Corps' line at Tokchon and Yongdong-ni. The Home-by-Christmas Offensive was completely stalled on the morning of November 26.

=== Actions at Tokchon and Yongdong-ni ===
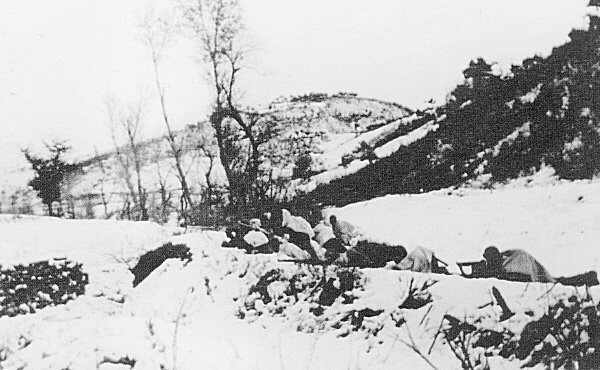
Chinese soldiers setting up an ambush against retreating UN forces

In the aftermath of the Battle of Onjong, the Chinese recognized ROKA II Corps as the most vulnerable unit of the Eighth Army. Besides lacking the firepower of their US counterpart, the Corps also held the most difficult terrain on the UN right flank. At 10:00 on November 24, the ROKA 7th Infantry Division on the II Corps' left flank attacked north from Tokchon. At the same time, the ROKA 8th Infantry Division on the II Corps' right flank advanced north from Yongdong-ni, but their advance was halted by the PVA 38th and 42nd Corps' stubborn resistance. The continuous fighting for the next two days failed to create any gains for the ROKA. During the advances, the PVA defenses managed to create a wedge in the center of the ROKA 7th Infantry Division, forcing the division to commit most of its reserves on the front line. Meanwhile, the ROKA 6th Infantry Division in the II Corps' rear could only offer its 2nd Infantry Regiment as the Corps' reserve due to the earlier losses at Onjong.

As the ROKA were preparing their defensive positions at dusk on November 25, the two PVA corps were mobilizing for a decisive counterattack against the Eighth Army's right flank. The PVA 38th Corps planned to attack in full force against the ROKA 7th Infantry Division's center and right flank, while two divisions from the 42nd Corps started to march through the hills in order to bypass the ROKA 8th Infantry Division's right flank. Given the importance of this assault, Han Xianchu, one of Peng's deputies, personally commanded the 38th and 42nd Corps for the rest of the battle.

The PVA 38th Corps landed the first blow against ROKA II Corps at 17:00 on November 25. Aided by total surprise, the PVA 113th Division, 38th Corps first shattered the 7th Infantry Division's Reconnaissance Company on the division's right flank, creating a 0.5 mi (800 m) gap between the 7th and 8th Infantry Divisions. Simultaneously, the PVA 114th Division, 38th Corps attacked the center-right of the 7th Infantry Division, pushing the 5th and 8th Infantry Regiments back in the process. When the 7th Infantry Division's center and right were in complete chaos, the PVA 112th and the 113th Division, 38th Corps slipped past the ROKA/UN lines and advanced towards Tokchon. With only one battalion in reserve to check the PVA divisions, the Tokchon garrison and the 7th Infantry Division headquarters were soon surrounded and attacked by the two PVA divisions at 16:00 on November 26. Under heavy pressures from the PVA 114th Division, the 5th and 8th Infantry Regiments tried to fall back to Tokchon, but PVA ambushes in the rear scattered the unsuspecting ROKA troops. On the afternoon of November 26, Tokchon was captured by the PVA, and the 3rd Infantry Regiment on the 7th Infantry Division's left flank drifted westward and joined the US 2nd Infantry Division.

While the 7th Infantry Division was being annihilated at Tokchon by the PVA 38th Corps, the 8th Infantry Division was also being routed, at Yongdong-ni by the PVA 42nd Corps. With the PVA 125th Division tying down the ROKA 10th and 21st Infantry Regiments at Yongdong-ni, the 124th and the 126th Division tried to infiltrate the 8th Infantry Division's rear by marching through the hills east of Yongdong-ni. At 13:00 on November 25, the ROKA 16th Infantry Regiment to the 8th Infantry Division's rear spotted the two PVA divisions at Maengsan (39.657°N 126.507°E), 20 km (12 mi) south of Yongdong-ni. Surprised by this development, the 8th Infantry Division ordered the 16th Infantry Regiment to block the PVA advance while the 10th and 21st Infantry Regiments were retreating from Yongdong-ni. But before the order could be carried out, the PVA struck first after learning their trap had been discovered. As the 10th and 21st Infantry Regiments were retreating from Yongdong-ni early in the morning of November 26, the PVA 125th Division ambushed both regiments, forcing the Koreans to abandon their heavy equipment and to scatter into the hills. Meanwhile, following the bonfires made by the Koreans for the cold weather, the PVA 124th Division overran a battalion from the 16th Infantry Regiment and attacked the 8th Infantry Division's command post at Maengsan. With the entire division dispersed, the 8th Infantry Division headquarters and the 16th Infantry Regiment broke out of Maengsan on November 27 and retreated from the battlefield.

During the chaos of the battle, Major general Yu Jae-hung of ROKA II Corps did not receive news from the front line until midnight of November 25 — five hours after the Chinese had entered the ROKA rear. Responding to the crisis, Yu committed the 2nd Infantry Regiment, 6th Infantry Division to block the PVA divisions. As the 2nd Infantry Regiment marched towards the front on the morning of November 26, the PVA 113th Division intercepted the regiment and destroyed its command post, scattering the ROKA II Corps' entire reserve in the process. With most of the ROKA II Corps' units destroyed by November 27, the UN right flank had fallen to the PVA.

Although UN aerial reconnaissance observed on November 27 that the PVA forces on the ROKA/UN right flank were moving rapidly into the Eighth Army's rear, Walker still ordered the rest of the Eighth Army to continue the offensive north. Convinced that the collapse of ROKA II Corps was merely a small counterattack by the PVA, Walker ordered US I and IX Corps to shift eastward in order to cover ROKA II Corps' sector. By that time, however, US I and IX Corps had already suffered heavy losses from the Chinese counteroffensive at Kujang-dong, Ipsok and Yongsan-dong.

=== Actions at Kujang-dong ===
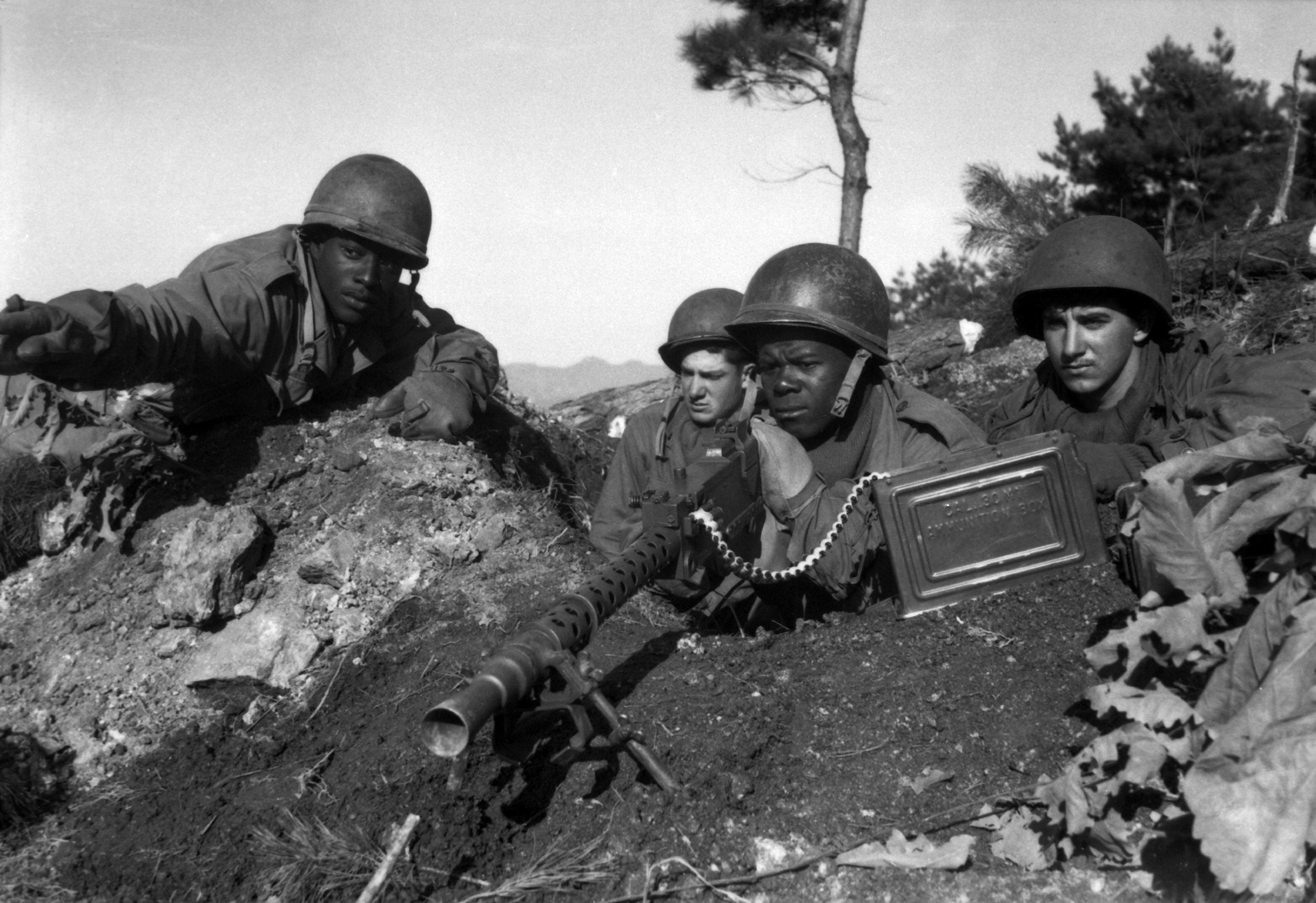
Soldiers from the US 2nd Infantry Division in action during late November 1950

On the left of the ROKA II Corps, the US 2nd Infantry Division of IX Corps was placed in the path of a major PVA supply line. During the Home-by-Christmas Offensive, US 9th Infantry Regiment led the division's advance northward along the Ch'ongch'on River, while the US 38th Infantry Regiment was placed on the division's right flank. The offensive started with little resistance, although the 9th Infantry Regiment was stalled by PVA defenses at Hill 219, north of Kujang-dong on November 25. In order to renew the offensive on the next day, the 23rd Infantry Regiment, 2nd Infantry Division was moved into the rear of the 9th Infantry Regiment. At the same time, the 38th Infantry Regiment had arrived at Somin-dong (39.88°N 126.169°E), a town on the road between Kujang-dong and Tokchon. When the aerial reconnaissance detected an increase in PVA activities, the 38th Infantry Regiment's A Company was sent on a patrol into PVA territory.

To ensure the success of the counterattack against ROKA II Corps, PVA 40th Corps was assigned the mission of protecting the PVA 38th Corps' flank against the US 2nd Infantry Division. To accomplish this mission, the PVA 119th Division, 40th Corps would first attack Somin-dong to prevent the Americans from reinforcing the ROKA. The 120th Division would then fight its way across the Ch'ongch'on River and tie down the bulk of the 2nd Infantry Division. Finally, the 118th Division would flank the Americans from the west and capture Kujang-dong from the rear.

On the night of the counteroffensive, the PVA 120th Division first accidentally stumbled upon the US 9th Infantry Regiment on the northern bank of the Ch'ongch'on River. The surprise encounter between the two sides soon left the 9th Infantry Regiment with only three rifle companies combat effective. Unaware that the 1st Battalion of the US 23rd Infantry Regiment had pulled up behind the US 61st Field Artillery Battalion, four Sharp Sword Companies from the PVA 359th Regiment, 120th Division proceeded to cross the river and attacked the US artillery positions. Although the 61st Battalion was routed by surprise, the 23rd Infantry Regiment quickly knocked out two of the unsuspecting PVA companies. The surviving PVA troops drifted eastward and occupied a hill named Chinaman's Hat, (39.9093°N 126.08°E) enabling them to overlook the entire 23rd Infantry Regiment's positions.

While the PVA 120th Division commenced its attack on the US 2nd Infantry Division's center, the PVA 119th Division was also trying to drive a wedge between Kujang-dong and Tokchon. In a series of confusing battles between the 119th Division and the 38th Infantry Regiment, the patrolling A Company, 38th Infantry Regiment was first splintered under Chinese attacks. Adding to the confusion, Chinese reconnaissance teams lured the US forces into exposing their positions, and the resulting PVA counter-fire caused the loss of the G Company on the 38th Infantry Regiment's center. The PVA had also penetrated the 38th Infantry Regiment's left flank, blocking the regiment's retreat route in the process. By the morning of November 26, PVA troops were observed all around the 38th Infantry Regiment.

The PVA promptly withdrew as the morning came on November 26, and a counterattack by the 38th Infantry Regiment later reopened the road to the rear. When the ROKA 3rd Infantry Regiment, 7th Infantry Division suddenly appeared in the 38th Infantry Regiment's sector, Regimental commander Colonel George B. Peploe realized the right flank of the US 2nd Infantry Division and the entire Eighth Army had collapsed. Under orders from Major general Laurence B. Keiser, commander of the US 2nd Infantry Division, Peploe immediately took command of the ROKA 3rd Infantry Regiment while trying to refuse his right flank. At the same time, Colonel Paul L. Freeman of the 23rd Infantry Regiment had also tried to lead his regiment to capture Chinaman's Hat, but without much success.

The PVA renewed their attacks on the night of November 26. A counterattack from Chinaman's Hat soon captured the 23rd Infantry Regiment's command post. On the 23rd Infantry Regiment's left, the 9th Infantry Regiment's G Company was also overrun by the attacking PVA forces, forcing Colonel Charles C. Sloane Jr. to withdraw the remnants of his regiment across the river. PVA ambushes in the rear then decimated the rest of the 9th Infantry Regiment. To the US 2nd Infantry Division's right, Commander Wen Yuchen of PVA 40th Corps ordered the 119th Division to destroy the 38th Infantry Regiment in order to protect the PVA breakthrough on the UN right flank. The ferocious fighting soon forced the 38th Infantry Regiment to fight its way back to Kujang-dong in order to rejoin the division.

Although Walker did not cancel the Home-by-Christmas Offensive on November 27, Keiser ordered his division to withdraw to Kujang-dong. Before Keiser's order was complete on November 28, Walker instructed Major general John B. Coulter of IX Corps to set up a new defensive line at Kunu-ri — 20 mi (32 km) south of the 2nd Infantry Division. Full scale retreat of the division started on the night of November 27, with the PVA attacking everywhere. As the division's convoy tried to move south, they were met with machine gun and mortar fire from numerous PVA roadblocks in the rear. PVA bazooka teams had also knocked out several vehicles while others were trying to swarm the tanks and to lob grenades into their hatches. With some losses, the 2nd Infantry Division broke through the PVA 118th Division's blockade and arrived at Kunu-ri on the night of November 28.

=== Actions at Ipsok ===
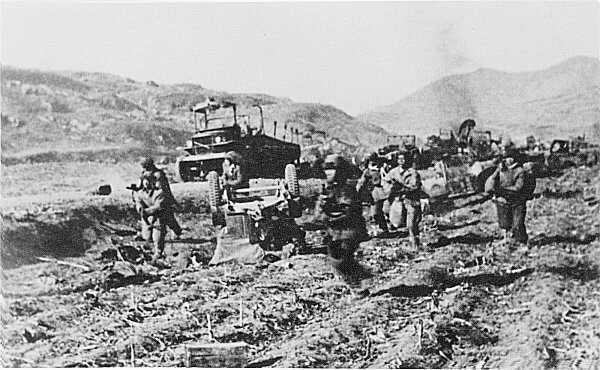
Soldiers from the Chinese 39th Corps pursue the US 25th Infantry Division

For the Home-by-Christmas Offensive, US 25th Infantry Division of IX Corps advanced on the left of the US 2nd Infantry Division along the Kuryong River, one of the northern tributaries of the Ch'ongch'on River. On November 24, the 25th Infantry Division started its offensive at the city of Yongbyon (39.7966°N 125.755°E), south of Ipsok. To lead the offensive, five companies of infantry, armor and artillery were drawn from the 25th Infantry Division to form a special task force named Task Force Dolvin. With Task Force Dolvin leading the offensive on the eastern bank of the Kuryong River, the US 24th Infantry Regiment, 25th Infantry Division was placed on the division's right to maintain contact with the 2nd Division, while the US 35th Infantry Regiment, 25th Infantry Division was on the western bank of the river advancing from Yongsan-dong to Unsan. The 27th Infantry Regiment, 25th Infantry Division was located in the division's rear as a reserve.

Because of the earlier UN defeat at the Battle of Unsan, the 25th Infantry Division expected to encounter heavy PVA resistance during its advance. However, the PVA screening forces withdrew as the US forces advanced. Aside from harassing fire, the 25th Infantry Division did not encounter strong resistance along the way. Ipsok was captured by Task Force Dolvin on November 24, and several American POWs from the Unsan battle were also recovered at the town. When Task Force Dolvin proceeded to capture a series of hills north of Ipsok on the next day, PVA resistance started to stiffen. During the hill battles on the afternoon of November 25, the Eighth Army Ranger Company of Task Force Dolvin suffered heavy losses against the Chinese defenses, and the task force stopped its advance at dusk.

While the 25th Infantry Division was advancing, the opposing PVA 39th Corps was waiting for instructions from the PVA High Command. But the PVA still conducted a series of probing actions against the American positions on the night of November 25. The PVA patrols soon destroyed the rest of the Ranger Company, while numerous PVA reconnaissance teams disguised as US forces infiltrated Task Force Dolvin's positions. On the right of Task Force Dolvin, the mountainous terrains scattered the 24th Infantry Regiment while blocking most of its radio transmissions. Upon learning of the destruction of the Ranger Company, Major general William B. Kean commander of the 25th Infantry Division sent the 2nd Battalion, 27th Infantry Regiment to reinforce Task Force Dolvin. He also sent the assistant division commander Brigadier general Vennard Wilson to command of the task force, renaming the task force Task Force Wilson.

After the successful attack against the Eighth Army's right flank, the PVA High Command gave the go ahead for the 39th Corps to attack the 25th Infantry Division on November 26. The PVA 115th Division of the 39th Corps was immediately mobilized for an assault against Task Force Wilson and the 24th Infantry Regiment, while the 116th and 117th Division were moving to attack Ipsok and to cut the American retreat route. The crushing attack soon left the task force decimated and reeling. The PVA 347th Regiment of the 115th Division first met the C Company on the task force's center, and after the sharp encounter most of the C Company's men were missing in action. (Note: Official Chinese history claimed that 115 black soldiers from Task Force Wilson's C Company were captured intact as a unit, but military historian Roy Appleman believed that those soldiers were from the missing C Company of the US 24th Infantry Regiment. See Appleman 1989, p. 139.) On the right flank, the 115th Division attacked the task force's B Company. Met with waves of PVA suicide bombers, the B Company was reduced to 26 soldiers out of the original 200. Some PVA snipers and infiltrators even managed to reach Task Force Wilson's command post, resulting in the death of the task force's executive officer. As the entire task force's line collapsing, E Company sleeping at the task force's rear was pushed to the front line. Although the tank fire from the E Company stopped the Chinese advance, the company was reduced to just one platoon after the battle. PVA forces in the rear had also attacked the task force's artillery at Ipsok, preventing fire support during the night. In the aftermath of the night battle, the task force found itself surrounded, and the PVA troops were chanting in all directions against the US forces. When Wilson tried to evacuate the wounded, PVA roadblocks ambushed the medical convoy just south of the 2nd Battalion's perimeter.

With only the 2nd Battalion of Task Force Wilson remaining combat effective on the morning of November 27, Wilson ordered the task force to withdraw to Ipsok. Under heavy air cover, the 2nd Battalion broke through PVA 348th Regiment's roadblock and reached Ipsok on the afternoon. Meanwhile, the US 24th Infantry Regiment had lost contact with most of its units, and the regiment commander Colonel John T. Corley could only collect one battalion from his regiment on the morning of November 27. (Note: The other two battalions of the 24th Infantry Regiment drifted into the 9th and 27th Infantry Regiment's sectors after heavy PVA attacks, and both battalions were attached to other regiments for the rest of the battle. How those two battalions became separated from the 24th Infantry Regiment is unclear due to the communication breakdown and the loss of all records. See Appleman 1989, p 142.) On November 28, Walker shifted US I Corps eastward by attaching the 25th Infantry Division to it, while ordering the 25th Infantry Division to withdraw to the Ch'ongch'on River. With the 35th Infantry Regiment rejoining the 25th Infantry Division after the battle at Yongsan-dong, the 25th Infantry Division withdrew south and Task Force Wilson was dissolved by Kean on November 28.

=== Actions at Yongsan-dong ===
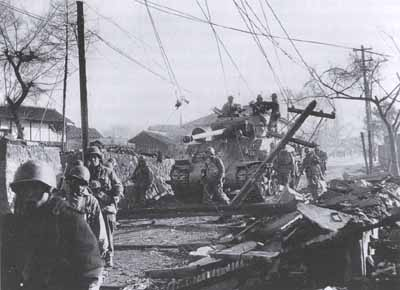
US tanks and infantry attack toward the Yalu River in November 1950.

After an extensive refit in the aftermath of the Unsan battle, the ROKA 1st Infantry Division was placed on the US I Corps' right flank at Yongsan-dong on November 20. As part of the Home-by-Christmas Offensive, the division was to advance north and to capture the town of Taechon (39.919°N 125.492°E) while the 35th Infantry Regiment, 25th Infantry Division was advancing north from Yongsan-dong on the Korean right flank. At the same time, the US 24th Infantry Division of US I Corps would advance towards Chongju on the ROKA 1st Infantry Division's left flank.

On the morning of November 24, the ROKA 1st Infantry Division advanced towards Taechon with its 11th and 12th Infantry Regiment on point. Although PVA booby traps and mortar fire tried to delay the ROKA forces along the way, the 1st Infantry Division still managed to envelop the town by the dusk of November 24. But unknown to the ROKA forces, the division was marching into a PVA assembly area, and the resistance around Taechon immediately increased as the result. On the night of November 24, the defending PVA 66th Corps counterattacked the ROKA forces with infantry and cavalry charges, and the PVA and ROKA troops were soon locked in a seesaw battle from November 25 to 26.

As the battle around Taechon dragged into the night of November 26, the ROKA 11th Infantry Regiment on the division's right became disorganized. Brigadier general Paik Sun-yup commander of the 1st Infantry Division soon brought up the 15th Infantry Regiment from his reserve to relieve the 11th Infantry Regiment. After receiving news of the PVA attack against the 25th Division across the Kuryong River, Paik had also directed his division to defend against the PVA counteroffensive. As the morning came on November 27, the PVA troops around Taechon did not stop their assault even under punishing UN air strikes, and some of the attacks spilled into 24th Infantry Division's area. Upon noticing their flank was buckling, the 24th Infantry Division and the 35th Infantry Regiment started the retreat southward to the Ch'ongch'on River.

At 13:00 on November 27, Peng ordered the PVA 66th Corps to destroy the ROKA 1st Infantry Division before they could retreat to the Ch'ongch'on River. On the evening of November 27, the PVA 66th Corps launched a massive attack against the ROKA 1st Infantry Division, the US 5th Regimental Combat Team of the 24th Infantry Division and the US 35th Infantry Regiment. After midnight, the PVA attacks broke through the ROKA lines and captured Yongsan-dong, resulting in the loss of the ROKA 11th, 15th and US 35th Infantry Regiment's command posts. The 11th and 15th Infantry Regiments were soon scattered while the retreating 35th Infantry Regiment was blocked at Yongsan-dong with PVA forces attacking from behind. Under heavy pressure, the 35th Infantry Regiment fought its way through the town and rejoined the 25th Division on the afternoon of November 28. At the same time, Paik rallied the broken ROKA regiments and recaptured Yongsan-dong. The ROKA 1st Infantry Division held the town against the subsequent PVA attacks until it withdrew from the battle on November 29.

=== Actions at Kunu-ri ===
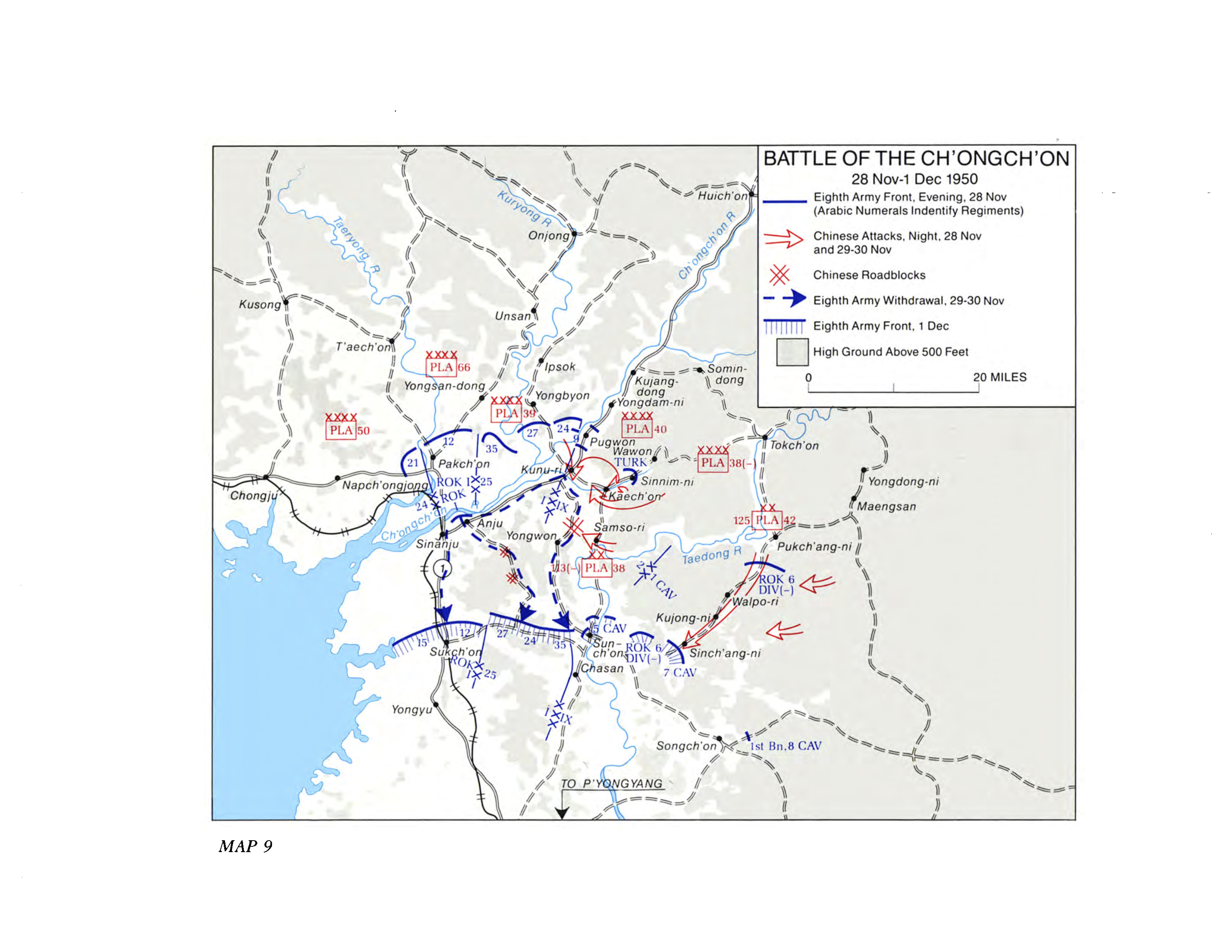
Map of Battle of the Ch'ongch'on River, November 28 – December 1, 1950

Kunu-ri is a crossroads village on the northern bank of the Kaechon River, one of Ch'ongch'on River's southern tributaries. As the PVA counteroffensive grew in strength against the Eighth Army's center, Kunu-ri had become a major bottleneck for US IX Corps' retreat. In an effort to stabilize the front on November 28, Walker ordered the US 2nd Infantry Division to retreat from Kujang-dong and to set up a new defensive line at Kunu-ri. The importance of Kunu-ri was also noted by the Chinese, and on November 27, Peng instructed the PVA 38th Corps to cut the US IX Corps retreat route. The PVA 114th Division of 38th Corps would capture Kunu-ri by marching westward on the road from Tokchon, while the PVA 112th Division would follow on a parallel route through the hills north of the road.

With the US 2nd Infantry Division still engaged at Kujang-dong, Coulter ordered the Turkish Brigade in the IX Corps reserve to block the PVA advance. On the night of November 27, the Turks took up defensive position at Wawon (39.705°N 126.06°E) to the east of Kunu-ri. They were soon met with the PVA 342nd Regiment, 114th Division. The ensuing battle between the Chinese regiment and the brigade's advance battalion continued for much of the November 28, resulting in 400 Turkish casualties. As dusk came on November 28, the Turkish Brigade tried to retreat 5 km (3.1 mi) west to Sinim-ri to set up stronger defensive positions, but the PVA 342nd Regiment caught up with the brigade and attacked its rear, completely surrounding the brigade. With communications cut between the brigade and the Turkish headquarters, the PVA 340th and the 342nd Regiment, 114th Division then fragmented the brigade during the night battle. The trapped Turks broke out of the PVA encirclement on the morning of November 29 and the brigade was attached to the US 2nd Infantry Division.

Although the Turkish Brigade was crippled by the PVA, its delaying action allowed the 2nd Infantry Division to secure Kunu-ri on the night of November 28. With the US 23rd Infantry Regiment setting up defensive positions to the north of Kunu-ri on the morning of November 29, the US 38th Infantry Regiment tried to occupy the hills to the northeast of Kunu-ri. But the American soon found the PVA 112th Division had already occupied the hills. The 38th Infantry Regiment was then forced to occupy a lower position at 1 mi (1.6 km) away from the Chinese. At the same time, the remnants of the Turkish Brigade joined up with the 38th Infantry Regiment, covering the regiment's right flank on the northern bank of the Kaechon River.

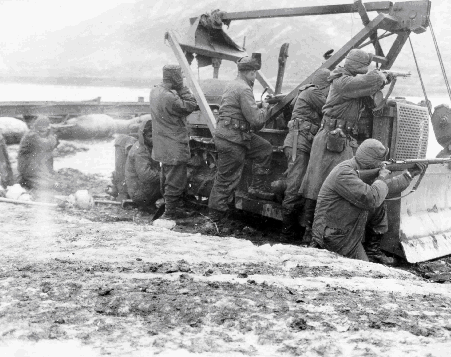
Elements of the US 2nd Engineer Combat Battalion, part of the 2nd Infantry Division, fighting a rear-guard action at Kuni-ri

On the afternoon of November 28, MacArthur started to recognize that a crisis was growing in Korea. With the start of the Battle of Chosin Reservoir on November 27, MacArthur gathered his field commanders, including Walker, for a conference in Tokyo. During the conference, MacArthur learned about the situation on the Eighth Army's right flank and judged that the Eighth Army was in great danger. He instructed Walker to withdraw from the battle before the Chinese could surround the Eighth Army. After the conference at November 29, Walker ordered all Eighth Army units to retreat to a new line around Sunchon, 30 mi (48 km) south of Kunu-ri.

Following Walker's orders, most of the Eighth Army's major units promptly broke contact with the Chinese and withdrew, but the 2nd Infantry Division was forced to stay at Kunu-ri in order to hold off the Chinese forces on the Eighth Army's right flank. By the time the 2nd Infantry Division tried to withdraw on the night of November 29, the two PVA divisions attacked the 38th Infantry Regiment. The PVA 112th Division first struck the 38th Infantry Regiment on the left flank, but the American defenses held firm, forcing the PVA to go on the defensive. Meanwhile, the PVA 114th Division attacked the Turkish Brigade and the right flank of the 38th Infantry Regiment. The Chinese outflanked the Turks by attacking along the southern bank of the Kaechon River, then crossed the river in the UN rear areas. Upon noticing this development, Brigadier general Tahsin Yazıcı of the Turkish Brigade ordered a withdrawal, leaving the right flank of the 38th Infantry Regiment completely uncovered. By the dusk on November 29, the PVA had cut the road between the 38th Infantry Regiment and Kunu-ri, and the Americans had to retreat by infiltrating the PVA lines. At 04:00 on November 30, the 38th Infantry Regiment crossed the Kaechon River under the cover of the 23rd Infantry Regiment and Kunu-ri was under PVA control.

=== The Gauntlet ===
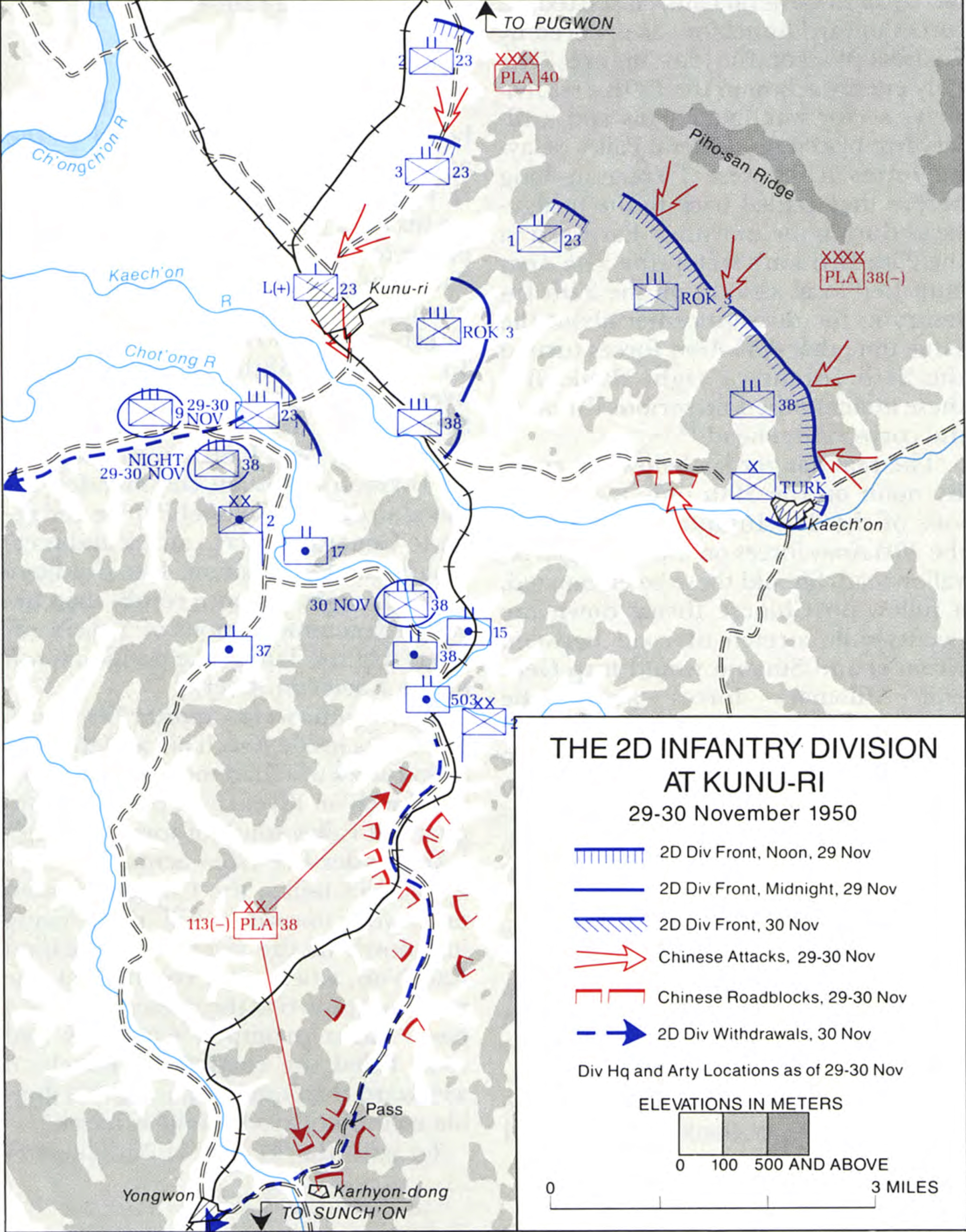
Map of the retreat by US 2nd Infantry Division

In the aftermath of ROKA II Corps' collapse on November 27, Peng immediately ordered the PVA 38th Corps to cut the road between Kunu-ri and Sunchon in the US IX Corps rear, while the PVA 42nd Corps would surround the entire Eighth Army by rushing south through Pukchang-ni and capture Sunchon. On the same day, Walker shifted the Eighth Army's line eastward by attaching the US 1st Cavalry Division and the Anglo-Australian 27th Commonwealth Infantry Brigade to US IX Corps. The 1st Cavalry Division would contain the PVA breakthrough at Pukchang-ni, while the 27th Commonwealth Brigade secured the road between Kunu-ri and Sunchon.

With the new orders on November 28, the US 5th Cavalry Regiment, 1st Cavalry Division left Kunu-ri to rejoin the division to the northeast of Sunchon. With the 5th Cavalry Regiment absent and the 8th Cavalry Regiment still recovering from devastating losses from the battle at Unsan, Major general Hobart Gay commander of the 1st Cavalry Division placed the 7th Cavalry Regiment to the south of Pukchang-ni, behind the remnants of the ROKA 6th Infantry Division. Lacking reinforcements, the 6th Infantry Division was quickly routed by the PVA 42nd Corps on the night of November 28. PVA forces then attacked the 7th Cavalry Regiment under the cover of the fleeing Korean soldiers and refugees pouring into the American front. Under Gay's order, the 7th Cavalry Regiment withdrew southwest to the town of Sinchang-ni (39.409°N 126.136°E) on the morning of November 29, and the PVA resumed the drive southward. A fierce battle between the PVA 125th Division and the 7th Cavalry Regiment broke out during the night of November 29, but by the morning of November 30 the PVA 42nd Corps' advance was halted.

The PVA 38th Corps, on the other hand, was marching towards the Kunu-ri—Sunchon road virtually unopposed. At 07:00 on November 28, the PVA 113th Division, 38th Corps occupied the town of Samso-ri (39.588°N 125.947°E), placing it right in the path of the 5th Cavalry Regiment and beside the Kunu-ri—Sunchon road. An hour and half later, the advance platoon from the 5th Cavalry Regiment was ambushed and destroyed. With its advance blocked, the 5th Cavalry Regiment tried to dislodge the PVA garrison, but it was forced to turn back by the afternoon.

The 113th Division then occupied the valley containing the Kunu-ri—Sunchon road at that night and blocked the retreat route of the 2nd Infantry Division. Upon receiving the news on November 29, 1st Battalion, Middlesex Regiment, part of 27th Brigade, tried to clear the valley from the south, but the attack was halted due to the lack of heavy weapons.

One of the first victims of the new PVA roadblock was a convoy from the Turkish Brigade, and it was ambushed on the night of November 28. A military police patrol was sent to investigate, but most of its members were killed by the morning. With the battle still raging at Kunu-ri, the news of the PVA roadblock reached the 2nd Infantry Division on November 29. Keiser sent the Reconnaissance Company and the remnants of the 9th Infantry Regiment to dislodge the Chinese, but the roadblock held firm even with a platoon of tanks attacking it. With the battle at Kunu-ri ended by the night of November 29, the PVA 112th Division joined the 113th Division and the roadblock grew to 6 mi (9.7 km) in depth.

"For the next 500 yards the road was temporarily impassable because of the numerous burning vehicles and the pile up of the dead men, coupled with the rush of the wounded from the ditches, struggling to get aboard anything that rolled...either there would be bodies in our way, or we would almost borne down by wounded men who literally throw themselves upon us...I squeezed [a wounded ROK soldier] into our trailer. But as I put him aboard, other wounded men piled on the trailer in such number that the Jeep couldn't pull ahead. It was necessary to beat them off."
Lieutenant Colonel William Kelleher of the US 1st Battalion, 38th Infantry Regiment describing the carnage at the Gauntlet

The 2nd Infantry Division, however, did not know the strength of the roadblock on the night of November 29. At the same time, the US 25th Infantry Division Military Police mistakenly reported that the alternative retreat route from Kunu-ri to Anju was also blocked by PVA. Later, Coulter ordered Keiser to withdraw by breaking the roadblock with the 27th Commonwealth Brigade. On the early morning of November 30, Keiser made the decision to withdraw through the valley.

On the morning of November 30, the 9th Infantry Regiment led the withdrawal by attacking the roadblock. Four tanks were first sent down the road and the PVA held their fire. Encouraged by this development, Colonel Sloane ordered the 9th Infantry Regiment to press forward, but PVA machine gun and mortar fire immediately stopped the advance at 09:00. The ROKA 3rd Infantry Regiment attached to the 2nd Infantry Division was sent to reinforce the US 9th Infantry Regiment, but it was routed by friendly fire. With no contacts between the American commands and the British units, the Middlesex Regiment advanced to the south end of the valley without attacking the roadblock. Believing that the roadblock was short and the British were attacking up the road, Keiser ordered the 2nd Infantry Division to run through the blockade at 10:00.

As the 2nd Infantry Division entered the valley, later known as the "Gauntlet", the PVA machine guns delivered punishing fire while mortar shells saturated the road. The length of the roadblock caught the 2nd Infantry Division by surprise, and the road was soon filled with wrecked vehicles and wounded and dead soldiers. Those who tried to take cover in the ditches were promptly left behind by the convoy rushing south, and unit cohesion instantly evaporated. During the day, the air cover tried to suppress the PVA positions with some success, but with no air cover at night, the PVA attack intensified. Finally, the PVA blocked the road completely by destroying the US 38th and 503rd Artillery Battalion of the 2nd Infantry Division, and the immobilized artillery pieces forced the rest of the division to abandon all vehicles and to retreat by hiking through the hills. At the rear of the division, Colonel Freeman attempted to save his 23rd Infantry Regiment by retreating through the Kunu-ri—Anju road. In one of the last acts of the battle, the 23rd Infantry Regiment fired off its stock of 3,206 artillery shells within 20 minutes, and the massive barrage shocked the PVA troops from following the regiment. The last stragglers from the 2nd Infantry Division finally arrived at Sunchon on December 1, and by December 2 the Eighth Army had completely lost contact with the Chinese.

== Aftermath ==
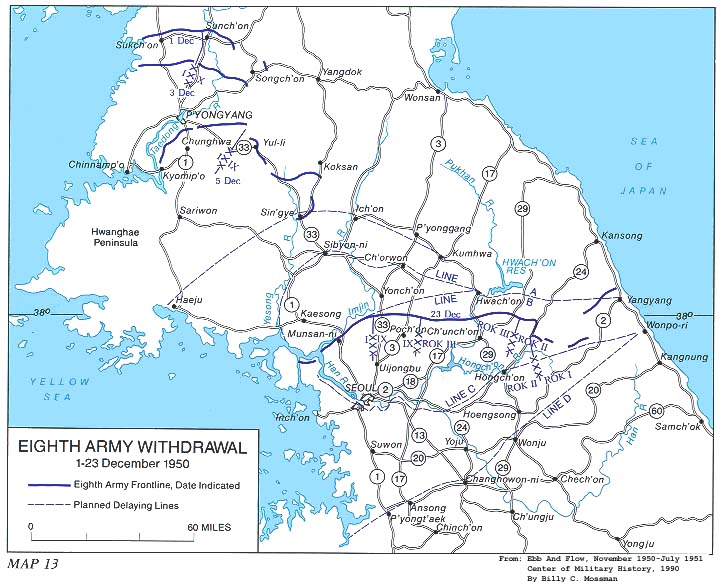
Map of US Eighth Army retreat, December 1–23, 1950.

In the aftermath of the battle, Eighth Army's casualty number exceeded 11,000 in the first count. A large number of documents, including all records from the 2nd Infantry Division and the 24th Infantry Regiment, were lost during the battle, and this made it difficult for historians to either analyze the events in detail or to assess the exact battle damage and losses incurred. However, it was later approximated that the 2nd Infantry Division had suffered 4,037 casualties, and most of its artillery pieces, 40 percent of its signal equipment, 45 percent of its crew-served weapons, and 30 percent of its vehicles were lost during the battle. Another figure even demonstrated a much worse situation for the 2nd Infantry Division; a count rendered on 1 December listed 2nd Division battle casualties at 4,940 for the last half of November; of these, 90 percent had been incurred since November 25. When reconciled with non-battle casualties, replacements, and returnees, the battle losses left the division 8,662 men short of authorized strength, or 4,731 men short of the division's actual strength on 15 November. The 1st Cavalry took over the line originally assigned to the 2nd Division. Thus, the 2nd Infantry Division was deemed to be crippled, and Keiser was relieved from command by the end of the battle. The other US unit that had reported significant losses was the 25th Infantry Division with 1,313 casualties. The Turkish Brigade had also reported 936 casualties with 90 percent equipment, 90 percent vehicle and 50 percent artillery losses, and the brigade was rendered combat ineffective. ROKA casualties could not be estimated due to the complete absence of South Korean records during the first half of the Korean War, but according to Paik, ROKA II Corps' headquarters was forced to disband in the aftermath of the battle. However, PVA losses were extreme. Peng estimated 45,000 casualties by the end of the battle, yet the official Chinese history only attributed approximately 20,000 casualties to combat, while the rest were attributed to the lack of adequate winter clothing and the lack of food. For its role in setting up the Gauntlet against the 2nd Infantry Division, the PVA 38th Corps was awarded the title "Ten Thousand Years Corps" by Peng on December 1, 1950.

With the 2nd Infantry Division, the Turkish Brigade and ROKA II Corps out of action, Eighth Army was reduced to just two corps, composed of four divisions and two brigades. Meanwhile, the over-extended Chinese logistics system had also left the victorious PVA 13th Army Group half-starved and incapable of any further offensive operations. But during the chaotic UN retreats, no reconnaissance was conducted to determine the state of the Chinese forces. As a result, Walker ordered the Eighth Army to abandon North Korea on December 3, much to the surprise of the PVA commanders. The following 120 mi (190 km) withdrawal to the 38th Parallel is often referred to as "the longest retreat in US military history." Aside from extremely low morale after the battle, the entire Eighth Army was also gripped with "bug out fever" during the retreat, and a song called the "Bug-Out Boogie" was composed to commemorate the Eighth Army's defeat. Walker died two days before the Christmas of 1950 when a truck driven by a ROKA soldier collided with his jeep, and Lieutenant general Matthew B. Ridgway assumed the command of the Eighth Army. At the UN, all hopes for a unified Korea were abandoned, and a ceasefire at the 38th Parallel was proposed to China on December 11, 1950.

Having decisively won the battle and once again turned the tide of the war in favor of the Communists, the Battle of the Ch'ongch'on River represented the peak of the Chinese military's performance in Korea. However, Mao interpreted the UN ceasefire as a weakness that China should further exploit. Against advice from Peng and other senior military leaders, Mao ordered the PVA to invade South Korea—a mission that was beyond the Chinese military's abilities while breaking the fragile Chinese supply lines. Recognizing the Chinese difficulties, Ridgway then led the Eighth Army to inflict severe losses on the PVA during the Chinese offensives of 1951.

== See also ==
- History of the People's Liberation Army
- History of the United States Army

== Notes ==
Footnotes

Citations
