= Korean War order of battle: United States Eighth Army =

Insignia of the US Eighth Army

This is the US Eighth Army order of battle during the Korean War:

- US Eighth Army
  - US I Corps 13 September 1950 – End of war
    - US 1st Cavalry Division 13 September 1950 – January 1951; April 1951 – December 1951
    - US 2nd Infantry Division 23 July 1950 – End of war
    - US 3rd Infantry Division January 1951 - 11 July 1952
    - US 7th Infantry Division January 1953 – End of war
    - US 24th Infantry Division 13 September 1950 – January 1951; January 1952 – January 1953
    - US 25th Infantry Division January 1951 – March 1952; January 1953 – End of war
    - US 45th Infantry Division December 1951 – January 1953
    - US 1st Marine Division January 1953 – End of war
    - British 27th Infantry Brigade 13 September 1950 – January 1951
    - British 1st Commonwealth Division March 1952 – January 1953
    - ROK 1st Infantry Division 13 September 1950 – April 1951; March 1952 – End of war
    - ROK 2nd Infantry Division January 1953 – End of war
    - ROK 8th Infantry Division March 1952 – January 1953
    - ROK 9th Infantry Division March 1952 – January 1953
    - ROK 25th Infantry Division January 1953 – End of war
  - US IX Corps 23 September 1950 – End of war
    - 5th Regimental Combat Team January 1952 - End of war
    - US 187th Regimental Combat Team January 1951 – March 1951
    - US 1st Cavalry Division January 1951 – January 1952
    - US 2nd Infantry Division 23 September 1950 – January 1951; March 1952 – January 1953
    - US 3rd Infantry Division – January 1953 – End of war
    - US 7th Infantry Division March 1951 – January 1953
    - US 24th Infantry Division January 1951 – January 1952
    - US 25th Infantry Division 23 September 1950 – January 1951
    - US 40th Infantry Division March 1952 – January 1953
    - US 45th Infantry Division January 1952 – March 1952
    - US 1st Marine Division January 1951 – March 1951
    - British 27th Infantry Brigade 17 February 1951 - April 1951
    - ROK Capital Division March 1952 – End of war
    - ROK 2nd Infantry Division March 1951 – January 1952; March 1952 – January 1953
    - ROK 3rd Infantry Division March 1952 – January 1953
    - ROK 6th Infantry Division January 1951 – January 1952
    - ROK 9th Infantry Division January 1953 – End of war
  - US X Corps 15 September 1950 – End of war
    - US 2nd Infantry Division April 1951 – March 1952
    - US 3rd Infantry Division 24 December 1950 – April 1951
    - US 7th Infantry Division 15 September 1950 – April 1951
    - US 25th Infantry Division March 1952 – January 1953
    - US 40th Infantry Division January 1953 – End of war
    - US 45th Infantry Division January 1953 – End of war
    - US 1st Marine Division 15 September 1950 – December 1950; March 1951 – January 1953
    - ROK 2nd Infantry Division October 1950 – March 1952
    - ROK 5th Infantry Division October 1950 – April 1951
    - ROK 6th Infantry Division March 1952 – January 1953
    - ROK 7th Infantry Division April 1951 – End of war
    - ROK 8th Infantry Division October 1950 – March 1952
    - ROK 12th Infantry Division January 1953 – End of war
    - ROK 20th Infantry Division January 1953 – End of war
