= 82nd Group Army =

Chinese military unit

- 第八十二集团军
- Founded: 1949–present
- Country: China
- Allegiance: Chinese Communist Party
- Branch: People's Liberation Army Ground Force
- Type: Group army
- Size: Field Army
- Part of: Central Theater Command Ground Force
- Garrison/HQ: Baoding, Hebei
- Nicknames: Ten Thousand Years Army; Long-Lived Group Army
- Anniversaries: July 22
- Engagements: Long March; World War II; Chinese Civil War; Korean War; Vietnam War; Sino-Vietnamese War

Commanders
- Current commander: Major General Fu Xianxue
- Political Commissar: Major General Wang Xiaoyong
- Notable commanders: Peng Dehuai; Luo Ronghuan; Liang Xingchu; Xu Qinxian

Insignia
- NATO Map Symbol

The 82nd Group Army (Chinese: 第八十二集团军; pinyin: Dì Bāshí'èr Jítuánjūn), Unit 31677, formerly the 38th Group Army, is a military formation of the Chinese People's Liberation Army Ground Force (PLAGF). The 82nd Group Army is one of thirteen total group armies of the PLAGF, the largest echelon of ground forces in the People's Republic of China, and one of three assigned to the nation's Central Theater Command.

== History ==
=== Chinese Civil War ===
The unit was originally established as the 38th Corps under the Fourth Field Army in early 1949. The 38th can trace its lineage back to the late 1920s through its evolution from the 343rd Brigade. In 1949 the 38th Corps was composed of the 112th, 113th, and 114th Divisions. Under Lin Biao in mid-June 1949, the 38th took part in the campaign to take Southern China and encircled Yichang, Hubei and seized the city.

=== Korean War ===
The 38th, the 40th and the 42nd Corps (the finest of the Fourth Field Army) along with the 27th and the 39th Corps from South China were placed at Peng Dehuai's disposal as part of the People's Volunteer Army (Chinese People's Volunteers (CPV) XIII Army Group, for the initial Chinese intervention in Korea.

In Battle of the Ch'ongch'on River 38th Corps and the 42nd Corps poured through the broken South Korean lines to Eighth Army’s east and threatening to envelop the entire force. The 38th corps overran ROK 7th Division on November 25–26, then Turkish Brigade on 26-29. Its 113th division covered 72.5 kilometers within 14 hours and reached Samso-ri on November 28 7:00 to halt US 2nd Infantry Division from retreat. 38th Corps was ultimately successful in setting up the "Gauntlet" against the US 2nd Infantry Division at Kunu-ri, and for its performance it received the title "Ten thousand years Army" (万岁军). It's estimated that Chinese People's Volunteer Army inflicted 23,000 casualties on UNC, among them, 7,485 killed or wounded and 3,616 captured (including 1,042 US soldiers) were inflicted by the 38th Corps. US Eighth Army estimated it suffered 11,000 casualties, excluding South Korean casualties.

In Third Battle of Seoul, the 38th Corps broke through defense organized by ROK 6th Division within 20 minutes on December 31, then defeated a regiment of US 24th Infantry Division on the southeast of Uijeongbu on January 3.

In the Fourth Phase Battle, the 38th Corps were deployed on the south bank of the Han River to defend against US 24th Infantry Division, US First Cavalry Division, British 27th Brigade and ROK 6th division. During 50 days fierce fight, the 38th Corps estimated that it inflicted more than 10,800 casualties on UNC, but the 38th Corps suffered 3,359 killed which accounts for some 50% of all the 38th Corps soldiers killed in Korean war.

The formation opposed the Turkish Brigade at the Battle of Wawon on November 27–29, 1950, and the U.S. 45th Infantry Division during the Battle of Old Baldy.

On October 6–15, 1952, the 38th Corps fought in the battle for Baengma-goji, a 395-meter hill near the Iron Triangle. During the course of the battle, the hill changed hands 24 times after repeated attacks and counterattacks for its possession. It was the most intense position-grasping battle for a small hill during the course of the Korean War. The 112th and 114th Divisions under the command of General Gang Ong-hwi were selected as the main force to capture Baengma-goji, and the 113th Division was to replenish the losses of the main force. The 38th Corps committed five regiments out of its total of nine regiments and sustained a total of 5,372 casualties (1,748 dead, 3062 wounded and 562 missing), while the 9th Division of South Korea suffered a total of 3,422 casualties (505 dead, 2,562 injured and 391 missing), plus over 400 more casualties in the 1st Battalion of the 30th Regiment. The American Fifth Air Force made a total of 745 sorties and poured more than 2,700 bombs of various kinds, together with over 358 napalm bombs, onto the hill. Chinese forces rained no less than 55,000 shells during the nine-day battle period, and the South Korean forces fired over 185,000 bombs. The 38th Corps, after having been replaced by the 23rd Corps, had to withdraw to the rear.

In the Korean war 6,772 soldiers serving in the 38th corps were killed, among them 599 were killed in First Phase Battle, 415 were killed in Second Phase Battle (Ch'ongch'on River sector), 247 were killed in Third Phase Battle (Seoul sector), 3,359 were killed in Fourth Phase Battle and 1,748 were killed in Battle of the White Horse Hill.

=== Cultural Revolution ===
The 38th Corps returned to China in 1953, remaining in Manchuria to reinforce the Fourth Field Army. In 1967, during the Cultural Revolution, the 38th was relocated to the Hebei area to replace the 65th Corps. In 1968 the 38th was involved in clashes with elements of the Hebei Military District over differences in revolutionary fervor.

=== 1980s ===
The 38th Corps reformed into 38th Combined Corps in 1985.

=== Tiananmen Square protests ===
In 1989 during the students' protest, the 38th Combined Corps was one of the main units ordered to crush the protests and impose martial law on Beijing. However, because of its close connections with the population of the nearby capital, and the fact that many students had served in the unit before attending university and that some students had performed summer training with the 38th as members of the army reserve, the unit was reluctant to comply. The 38th, under the command of General Xu Qinxian (徐勤先), refused to use force against the students when martial law was declared, and was reported to have been in a tense stand-off with the 27th Combined Corps and other units which held the city in the days immediately following the bloody crackdown.

=== 1990s ===
In October 1996, the 114th Division was transferred to the People's Armed Police and redesignated as the 114th Armed Police Division.

=== 21st century ===
The 82nd is currently one of the three group armies in active service belonging to the Central Theater Command. It is one of the best equipped and trained group armies in China today, and is given the task of guarding the national capital of Beijing. It also serves as a testbed for the latest equipment and doctrines developed by the PLA.

An unidentified mechanized division (probably from the 38th Group Army) conducted an opposed force exercise in mid-August 2002. It is believed that the exercise may have taken place at the MR CAT Base near the Great Wall. The unit used more than ten new systems including new mine clearing vehicles, infantry fighting vehicles and tanks. The unit is reported to be one of the first mechanized infantry divisions in the PLA.

According to the December 2002 PLA Activities Report, the Mechanized Air Defense Brigade (Unit 66440) assigned to the 38th Combined Corps recently improved its tactics and methods of defending against cruise missile attacks. This consisted of improving the units fire-control systems and detection capabilities.

The Mechanized Air-Defense Brigade, Unit 66440, has reportedly retrofitted its field command modules to provide command platforms with geographic information, air service information, battlefield monitoring and digital transmission, enhancing the units command and control capability and ability to conduct accurate air defense. The unit conducted several exercises in 2002 including a live-fire exercise.

In April 2017, the 82nd Group Army of the People's Liberation Army (PLA) Ground Force was formed through the reorganization of the 38th Group Army. The headquarters of the group army is located in Baoding City, Hebei Province.

== Organization ==
Before the 2017 reform, the formation consists of:

- 112th Mechanized Infantry Division (Chinese: 机械化步兵第112师)
- 113th Mechanized Infantry Division (Chinese: 机械化步兵第113师)
- 6th Armored Division (Chinese: 装甲第6师)
- 8th Army Aviation Brigade (Chinese: 陆航第8旅)
- Special Operation Brigade (Chinese: 特战旅)
- Artillery Brigade (Chinese: 炮兵旅)
- Mechanized Air-Defense Brigade (Chinese: 机械化防空旅)
- Chemical Regiment (Chinese: 防化团)
- Engineer Regiment (Chinese: 工兵团)

After 2017 reforming, the formation consists of:

- 6th Heavy Combined Arms Brigade (Chinese: 重型合成第6旅)
- 80th Light Combined Arms Brigade (Chinese: 轻型合成第80旅)
- 112th Heavy Combined Arms Brigade(Chinese: 重型合成第112旅)
- 127th Medium Combined Arms Brigade (Chinese: 中型合成第127旅)
- 151st Heavy Combined Arms Brigade (Chinese: 重型合成第151旅)
- 196th Light Combined Arms Brigade (Chinese: 轻型合成第196旅)
- 82nd Special Operation Brigade (Chinese: 特战第82旅)
- 82nd Army Aviation Brigade (Chinese: 陆航第82旅)
- 82nd Artillery Brigade (Chinese: 炮兵第82旅)
- 82nd Air-Defense Brigade (Chinese: 防空第82旅)
- 82nd Engineering Brigade (Chinese: 工兵第82旅)
- 82nd Chemical Defense Brigade (Chinese: 防化第82旅)
- 82nd Service Support Brigade (Chinese: 勤务支援第82旅)
