= 80th Motorized Infantry Brigade =

Brigade of the People's Liberation Army

80th Division (1949-52) 80th Infantry Division (1952-60) 80th Army Division (1960-85) 80th Motorized Infantry Division (1985-98) 80th Motorized Infantry Brigade (1998-2017) 80th Medium Combined Arms Brigade (2017-)
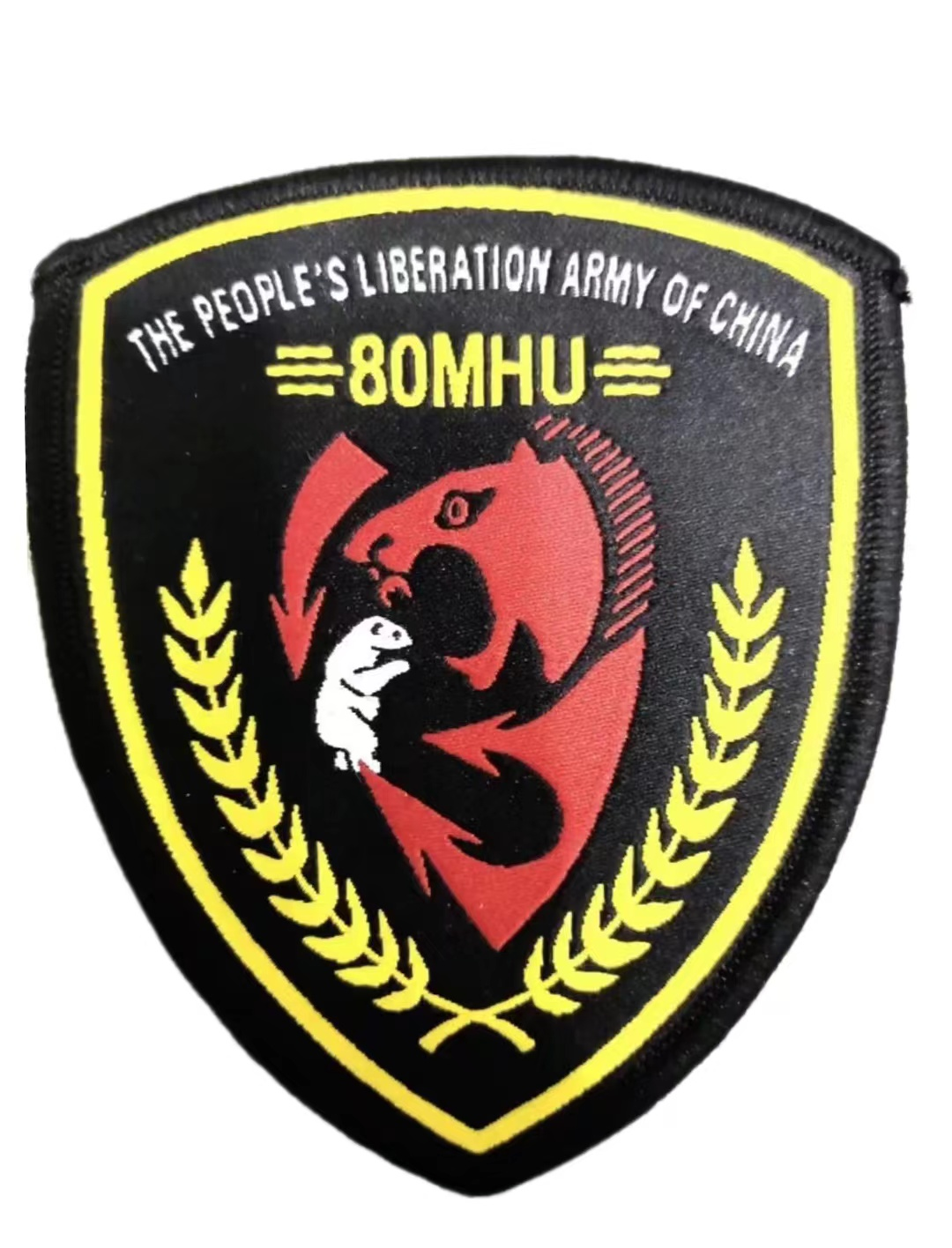
- Insignia of the PLA 80th MCAB
- Active: 1949.2 - present
- Country: People's Republic of China
- Branch: People's Liberation Army Ground Force
- Type: Combined Arms, Mechanized Infantry
- Size: Brigade
- Part of: 82nd Group Army
- Garrison/HQ: Luquan, Hebei (before 2017)
- Engagements: Chinese Civil War, Korean War, Vietnam War, Sino-Vietnamese War

The 80th Medium Combined Arms Brigade, formerly the 80th Division, is a military formation of the People's Liberation Army Ground Force. It's now a maneuver part of the PLA 82nd Group Army.

== History ==
The 80th Division (Chinese: 第80师) was created in February 1949 under the Regulation of the Redesignations of All Organizations and Units of the Army, issued by Central Military Commission on November 1, 1948, basing on the 26th Division, 9th Column of Huadong Field Army. Its history could be traced to 4th Security Brigade of Jiaodong Military District, formed in August 1945.

The division was a part of 27th Corps, under the flag of 80th the division took part in major battles during the Chinese Civil War.

== Korean War ==
In November 1950 the division entered Korea as a part of People's Volunteer Army.

On November 28, 1950, the 80th Division hit the dispersed U.S. units of Task Force Faith (RCT 31) with waves of infantry. Despite the presence of tracked antiaircraft weapons, the sub-zero cold and the constant Chinese attacks began to take their toll. The fighting was often hand to hand and convinced the (initial) U.S. Task Force commander, Colonel MacLean, to order a pullback to form a more consolidated defense. However, during the withdrawal operations his troops came under renewed enemy attack, and in the confusion MacLean was captured by the Chinese. Elements of the 80th Division also killed about 300 men from Task Force Faith. Almost all the men were wounded, who had been packed like sardines into trucks or trailers. Abandoned by the rear guard during the RCT's precipitous dash for safety with the Marines at Hagaru-ri, the wounded were trapped at a fire block. They were mostly killed by thermite grenades, thrown into the halted vehicles.

The Task Force Faith page also states that the 81st Division participated in the attack, and that though they were possibly reinforced, comprised 15,000+ troops. The 80th Division suffered such severe casualties virtually wiping out Task Force Faith, that they did not reappear on the battlefield until March, 1951.

During the campaign, the division, like all other units from the 9th Army Group, also suffered a lot from the cold weather. 40 percent of its combatants suffered from cold injury, and all but two personnel from 5th Company, 2nd Battalion, 242nd Infantry Regiment of the division were frozen to death on their perimeter before they attempted to ambush U.S. marines.

== After Korea ==
In June 1952 the division returned from Korea and renamed as the 80th Infantry Division (Chinese: 步兵第80师). As of late 1953, the division was composed of:

- 238th Infantry Regiment;
- 239th Infantry Regiment;
- 240th Infantry Regiment;
- 285th Tank Self-Propelled Artillery Regiment;
- 360th Artillery Regiment.

In April 1960 the division was renamed as the 80th Army Division (Chinese: 陆军第80师).

In June 1962, the division took part in the emergency combat alert mission in Zhejiang province.

In September 1967, 285th Tank Self-Propelled Artillery Regiment detached from the division and transferred to Armored Troops, Nanjing Military Region's control. The regiment then became 2nd Independent Tank Regiment of Nanjing Military Region in August 1969 and 37th Tank Regiment, 10th Tank Division in May 1976.

On August 20, 1969, the division moved to Hebei along with the Corps HQ. In December 360th Artillery Regiment was renamed as Artillery Regiment, 80th Army Division.

In August 1971, the division was re-organized as a motorized army division:

- 5th Independent Tank Regiment of Beijing Military Region attached to the division and renamed as Tank Regiment, 80th Army division.
- Anti-Aircraft Artillery Regiment activated.

During the 1970s the division act as the general reserve force of the Army in northern China.

In 1985 the division was renamed as the 80th Motorized Infantry Division (Chinese: 摩托化步兵第80师). From 1985 to 1998 the division maintained as a northern motorized infantry division, category A. By then the division was composed of:

- 238th Infantry Regiment;
- 239th Infantry Regiment;
- 240th Infantry Regiment;
- Tank Regiment;
- Artillery Regiment;
- Anti-Aircraft Artillery Regiment.

From December 1986 to April 1988, the division took part in the Battle of Laoshan, under the code-designation of "41st Infantry Division (D)".

The division took part in the enforced martial law and the crackdown on protests in Beijing, June 1989.

In 1998 the division was reduced and renamed as the 80th Motorized Infantry Brigade (Chinese: 摩托化步兵第80旅). The brigade was then composed of:

- 1st Infantry Battalion;
- 2nd Infantry Battalion;
- 3rd Infantry Battalion;
- Tank Battalion;
- 122mm Howitzer Artillery Battalion;
- 130mm Rocket Artillery Battalion;
- Twin-37mm AAA Battalion;
- Communications Battalion;
- Engineer Battalion;
- Repairing Battalion;
- Training Detachment.

In April 2017 the brigade was renamed as the 80th Medium Combined Arms Brigade (Chinese: 中型合成第80旅).

The brigade is now a maneuvering part of the PLA 82nd Group Army.
