= 118th Mechanized Infantry Brigade (People's Republic of China) =

Brigade of the People's Liberation Army

118th Division (1949-53) 118th Infantry Division (1953-60) 118th Army Division (1960-85) 118th Motorized Infantry Division (1985-98) 118th Mechanized Infantry Brigade (1998-2017) 118th Medium Combined Arms Brigade (2017-)
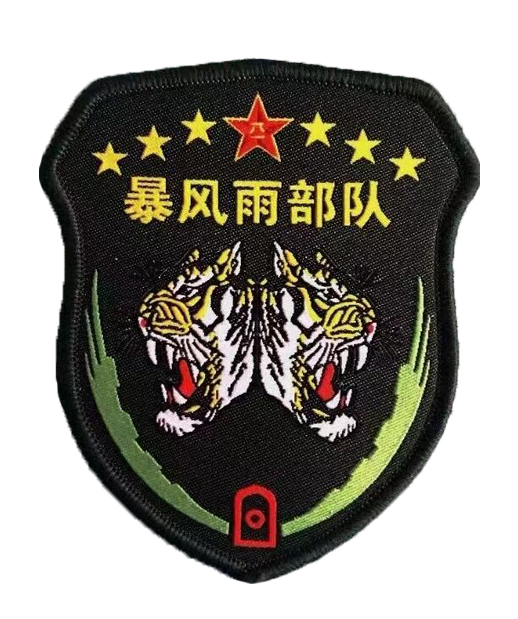
- Insinga of PLA 118th MCAB
- Active: 1949 – Present
- Country: People's Republic of China
- Branch: People's Liberation Army Ground Force, People's Volunteer Army
- Type: Combined Arms
- Size: Brigade
- Part of: 80th Group Army
- Nickname(s): Rainstorm Troops (Chinese: 暴风雨部队）
- Engagements: Chinese Civil War: Liaoshen Campaign; Pingjin Campaign; Korean War: Battle of Onjong; Battle of the Ch'ongch'on River; Battle of Hoengsong; Chinese spring offensive; Battle of Kapyong

== Chinese Civil War ==
During Chinese Civil War, this division was known as 7th division, 3rd column, Northeast Field Army and was an element of the 3rd column, nicknamed 'whirlwind column'. On 30 September 30 – 1 October 1947, the 7th Division and 8th Division covered 120 kilometers and encircled Kuomintang 116th Division in Weiyuanbao. On 2 October, the 7th Division annihilated the 116th Division with the assistance of the 8th Division, the action the origin of the distinction as Rainstorm Troops. In the Liaoshen Campaign, the battalion attacked General Liao Yaoxiang's headquarters. Then it fought in the Pingjin Campaign and Battle of Hainan Island.

== Korean War ==
The 118th Division was a military formation of the People's Volunteer Army (Chinese People's Volunteers (CPV) or Chinese Communist Forces (CCF)) during the Korean War with a standard strength of approximately 10,000 men. It was a component of the 40th Army, consisting of the 352nd, 353rd, and 354th Regiments.

118th division was the first unit engaged with UNC in Korean war. On 25 October 1950, it and 120th division encountered ROK 1st and 6th divisions in Battle of Onjong, and destroyed 6th division. Then this division attended Battle of the Ch'ongch'on River and Battle of Hoengsong.

In the first period of Chinese Spring Offensive, 118th division undertook the mission to defeat ROK 6th Division and open a gap between US Marine 1st Division and US 24th Infantry Division on the direction of Kapyong—Mokdong-ri. 118th division's attack started on the dusk of 22 April 1951 and overran ROK 6th division within six hours, then its vanguards, 3rd battalion, 354th regiment, reached Mokdong-ri on 23 April, 24:00, accomplished the division's mission, and engaged with British 27th Brigade in Battle of Kapyong.

== Current ==
The unit is part of the 80th Group Army in the Northern Theater Command Ground Force, as the 118th Medium Combined Arms Brigade.
