= 124th Amphibious Mechanized Infantry Division =

Division of the Chinese People's Liberation Army

The 124th Division was a division of the Chinese People's Liberation Army. It is now the 124th Combined Arms Brigade of the PLAGF

== History ==
During the Korean War, the 124th Division was part of the 42nd Army consisting of the 370th, 371st, and 372nd Regiments. The division was part of the People's Volunteer Army (PVA).

While the 124th Division at first drove back the ROK troops it encountered, and then slowed the advance of the U.S. Marine troops that replaced them on the road to the reservoir, UNC intelligence indicated that it did not have the success that attended the CCF action against the ROK II Corps and part of the U.S. I Corps in the west. The 124th Division faced the 1st Marine Division at Sudong on November 2. However, 124th division and other units of 42nd corps were relieved by 20th corps on November 10, and attended battle of Chongchon River. This division and 125th division defeated ROK 8th division on November 26, then 125th was deployed as van guard, and 124th division was its reinforce.

== Current ==
In April 2017, The division was divided into two brigades: the 124th Amphibious Combined Arms Brigade and the 125th Amphibious Combined Arms Brigade. The 124th is transferred to the PLA 72nd Group Army (formerly 1st Group Army) under the Eastern Theater Command; the 125th is still part of the PLA 42nd Group Army, which is currently known as the 74th Group Army, under the Southern Theater Command.

It is now an amphibious mechanised unit.
