= 112th Mechanized Infantry Division =

112th Division (1948–53) 112th Infantry Division (1953–60) 112th Army Division (1960–85) 112th Mechanized Infantry Division (1985–2019) 112th Heavy Combined Arms Brigade (2019–)
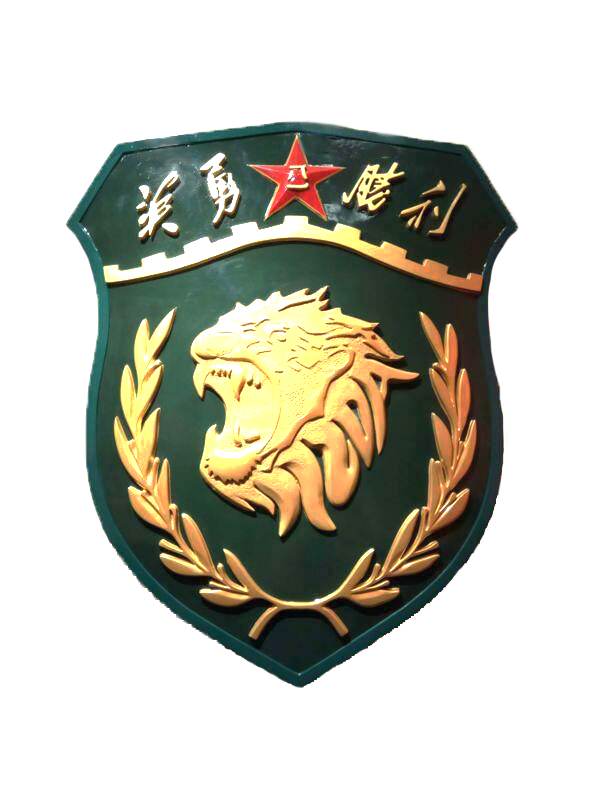
- Insignia of the PLA 112th HCAB
- Active: 1948.11 –
- Country: China
- Branch: People's Liberation Army Ground Force
- Type: Combined Arms, Mechanized Infantry
- Part of: Central Theatre Command Ground Force
- Garrison/HQ: Gaobeidian, Hebei
- Nickname: "New Rich" division(土豪师)
- Mottos: Valeria Victrix (Chinese: 英勇 胜利; pinyin: yīng yǒng shèng lì; lit. 'Bravery Victory')
- Equipment: ZTZ-99A Main Battle Tank, ZBD-04 Infantry Fighting Vehicle
- Engagements: Chinese Civil War, Korean War
- Battle honours: Red army division

The 112th Mechanized Infantry Division is a military formation of the People's Liberation Army of the People's Republic of China. The 112th Division (Chinese: 第112师) was created in November 1948 under the Regulation of the Redesignations of All Organizations and Units of the Army, issued by Central Military Commission on November 1, 1948, basing on the 1st Division, 1st Column of the Northeastern Field Army. Its history can be traced to 5th Corps of the Chinese Workers' and Peasants' Red Army taking part in the Pingjiang uprising in 1928.

Under the command of 38th Corps it took part in the Chinese Civil War.

== 1950s ==
Since 1950 it became a military formation of the People's Volunteer Army (People's Volunteer Army (PVA) or Chinese Communist Forces (CCF)) during the Korean War with a standard strength of approximately 10,000 men. It was a component of the 38th Corps, consisting of the 334th, 335th, and 336th Regiments.

The 334th Regiment was the first Chinese unit across the Yalu, on October 14, 1950.

In July 1953 it pulled back from Korea and stationed in Shenyang Military Region.

By then the division was composed of:

- 334th Regiment;
- 335th Regiment;
- 336th Regiment;
- 317th Tank Self-Propelled Artillery Regiment (attached early 1953);
- 392nd Artillery Regiment;

== 1960s ==
In 1960 it renamed as 112th Army Division (Chinese: 陆军第112师).

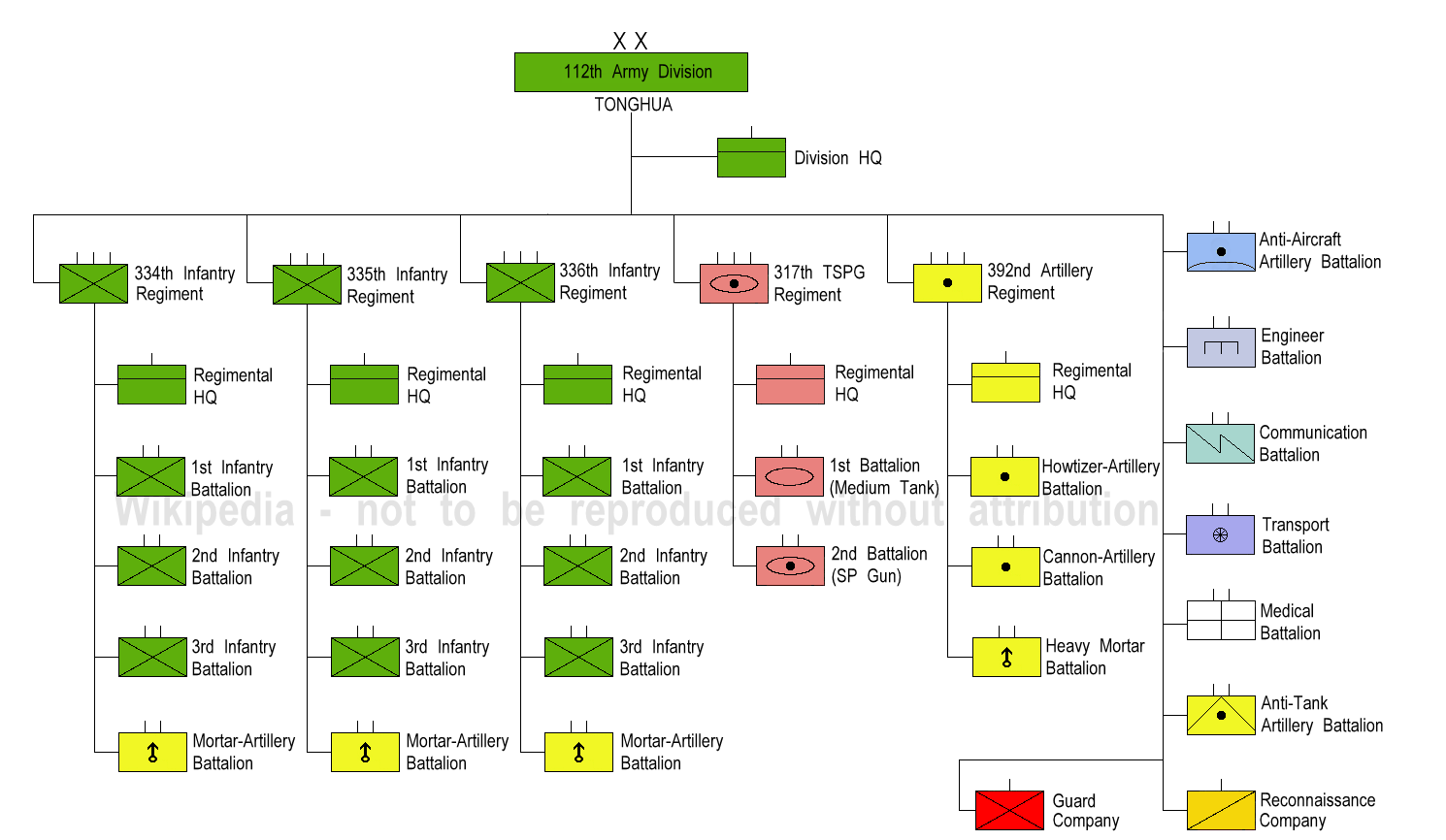
112th Army Division, 1960.

In January 1961 it became one of the first ten combat alert divisions of the army, which made it a "big" division under PLA glossaries, as a fully manned and equipped division.

In 1962 the division was designated as a "Northern" unit, Catalogue A.

In 1966 it moved to Gaobeidian, Hebei province with the Corps HQ.

In 1968 it started to convert to a northern motorized army division. All its 3 infantry regiments were converted to motorized units.

In 1969 the 317th Tank Self-Propelled Artillery Regiment was renamed as Tank Regiment, 112th Army Division. 392nd Artillery Regiment was renamed as Artillery Regiment, 112th Army Division.

== 1980s ==
In April 1984 it started to convert to a mechanized army division. All its 3 motorized regiments were converted to mechanized units.

In September 1985 it renamed as 112th Mechanized Infantry Division (Chinese: 机械化步兵第112师), as a mechanized infantry division. Its Antiaircraft Artillery Battalion was expanded to a regiment.

By then the division was composed of:

- 334th Mechanized Infantry Regiment;
- 335th Mechanized Infantry Regiment;
- 336th Mechanized Infantry Regiment;
- Tank Regiment;
- Artillery Regiment;
- Antiaircraft Artillery Regiment.

From April to June 1989 it took part in the enforce of martial law and the crackdown of protests in Beijing.

== 1990s ==
In 1998 the 336th Regiment was disbanded. The Tank Regiment was converted to Armored Regiment, 112th Division.

By then the division was composed of:

- 334th Mechanized Infantry Regiment;
- 335th Mechanized Infantry Regiment;
- Armored Regiment;
- Artillery Regiment;
- Antiaircraft Artillery Regiment.

== 2010s ==
In the late 2010s, the Armored Regiment was renamed as the new 336th Mechanized Regiment.

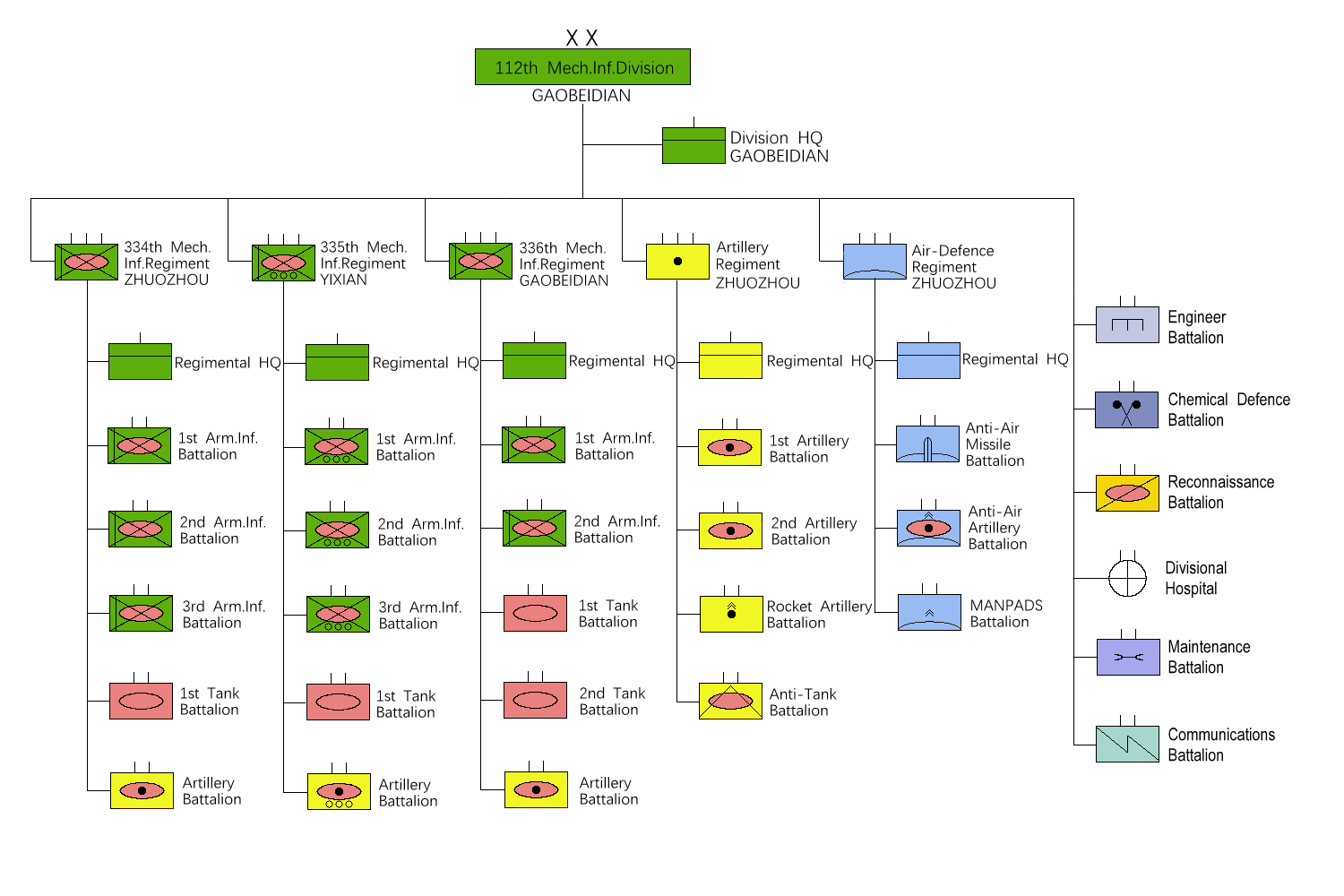
112th Mechanized Infantry Division, from 2011

In April 2017, the division was transferred to the Central Theater Command Ground Forces Component after the 38th Army's deactivation and remains active with the command till the present.

Today the division is organized into:

- Division HQ
- 334th Mechanized Infantry Regiment;
- 335th Mechanized Infantry Regiment;
- 336th Mechanized Infantry Regiment;
- 112th Divisional Field Artillery Regiment
- 112th Antiaircraft Regiment

In 2019 the division was reorganized: the division was reduced to the 112th Heavy Combined Arms Brigade(Chinese: 重型合成第112旅) minus its 335th Mechanized Infantry Regiment, which merged into the 189th Combined Arms Brigade.
