= 113th Mechanized Infantry Division =

113th Division (1948-53) 113th Infantry Division (1953-60) 113th Army Division (1960-85) 113th Motorized Infantry Division (1985-2003) 113th Mechanized Infantry Division (2003-17) 113th Medium Combined Arms Brigade (2017-)
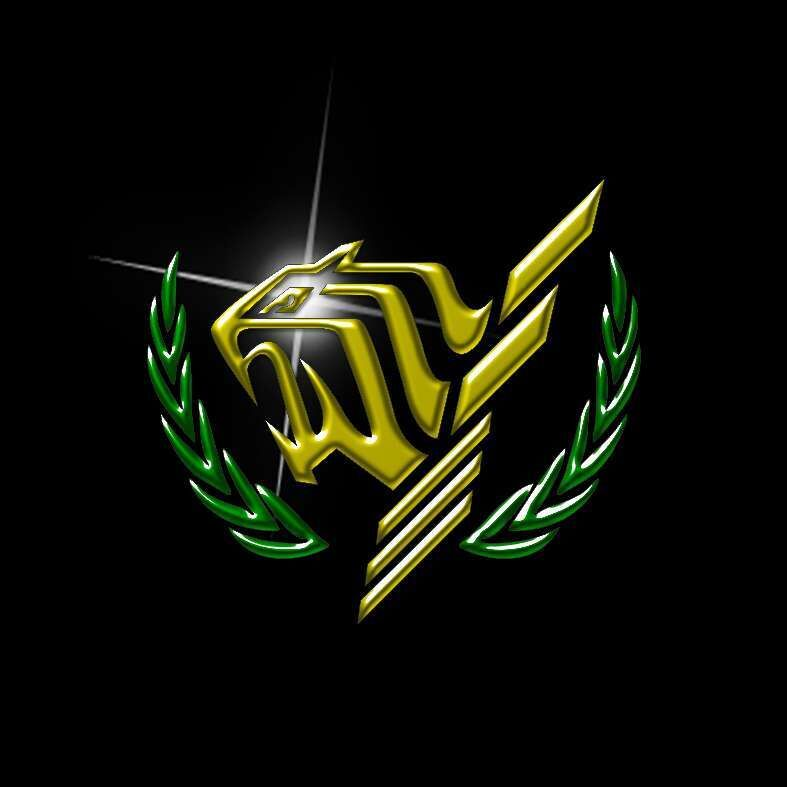
- Insignia of the PLA 113th MCAB
- Active: 1948.11 –
- Country: China
- Branch: People's Liberation Army Ground Force
- Type: Combined Arms, Mechanized infantry
- Part of: 83rd Group Army (113th Brigade); 82nd Group Army (151st Brigade)
- Garrison/HQ: Baoding, Hebei
- Engagements: Pingjiang Uprising, Chinese Civil War, Korean War

The 113th Mechanized Infantry Division, now the 113th Medium Combined Arms Brigade, is a military formation of the People's Liberation Army of the People's Republic of China.

The 113th Division (Chinese: 第113师) was created in November 1948 under the Regulation of the Redesignations of All Organizations and Units of the Army, issued by Central Military Commission on November 1, 1948, basing on the 2nd Division, 1st Column of the Northeastern Field Army. Its history can be traced to the Chinese Workers' and Peasants' Red Army taking part in the Pingjiang uprising in 1928.

Under the command of 38th Corps it took part in the Chinese Civil War.

Since 1950 it became a military formation of the People's Volunteer Army (Chinese People's Volunteers (CPV) or Chinese Communist Forces (CCF)) during the Korean War with a standard strength of approximately 10,000 men. It was a component of the 38th Army, consisting of the 337th, 338th, and 339th Regiments.

The 113th Division captured Samso-ri on November 28, 1950, cutting the UN's retreat to Sunchon while the Marines were surrounded at the Chosin, in an attempt to surround and destroy all UN forces in North Korea. However, the UN forces were able to fight their way through Chinese lines and evacuate.

In July 1953 it pulled back from Korea and stationed in Shenyang Military Region.

By then the division was composed of:

- 337th Infantry Regiment;
- 338th Infantry Regiment;
- 339th Infantry Regiment;
- 318th Tank Self-Propelled Artillery Regiment (attached early 1953);
- 393rd Artillery Regiment.

In 1960 it renamed as the 113th Army Division (Chinese: 陆军第113师).

In 1962 the division was designated as a "Northern" unit, Catalogue A.

In 1966 it moved to Baoding, Hebei province with the Corps HQ.

In 1968 it started to convert to a northern motorized army division. All its 3 infantry regiments were converted to motorized units.

In 1969 the 318th Tank Self-Propelled Artillery Regiment was renamed as Tank Regiment, 113th Army Division. 393rd Artillery Regiment was renamed as Artillery Regiment, 113th Army Division.

In September 1985 it renamed as the 113th Motorized Infantry Division (Chinese: 摩托化步兵第113师), as a northern motorized infantry division, catalogue A. Its Antiaircraft Artillery Battalion was expanded to a regiment.

By then the division was composed of:

- 337th Motorized Infantry Regiment;
- 338th Motorized Infantry Regiment;
- 339th Motorized Infantry Regiment;
- Tank Regiment;
- Artillery Regiment;
- Antiaircraft Artillery Regiment.

From April to June 1989 it took part in the enforce of martial law and the crackdown of protests in Beijing.

In 1998 the 339th Regiment was disbanded. The Tank Regiment was converted to Armored Regiment, 113th Division.

In 2003 the division was re-equipped with ZSL-92 wheeled APC and re-organized as a light mechanized infantry division. At the same time the division was renamed as the 113th Mechanized Infantry Division (Chinese: 机械化步兵第113师).

By then the division was composed of:

- 337th Mechanized Infantry Regiment;
- 338th Mechanized Infantry Regiment;
- Armored Regiment;
- Artillery Regiment;
- Antiaircraft Artillery Regiment.

The unit was active with the 38th Army in the Beijing Military Region (Central Theater Command since 2016) until April 2017.

== 113th Combined Arms Brigade ==
In April 2017 the division was divided into two brigades: the 113th Medium Combined Arms Brigade (Chinese: 中型合成第113旅) and the 151st Heavy Combined Arms Brigade (Chinese: 重型合成第151旅). The 151st Brigade is still an active part of the 82nd Group Army (formerly the 38th Group Army), while the 113th Brigade was transferred to the 83rd Group Army (formerly the 54th Group Army). Both armies are under the Central Theater Command Ground Force.
