= 7th Infantry Division (South Korea) =

- 제7보병사단
- Shoulder Sleeve Insignia
- Active: 10 June 1949 – present
- Country: South Korea
- Branch: Republic of Korea Army
- Type: Infantry
- Size: Division
- Part of: II Corps
- Garrison/HQ: Hwacheon County, Gangwon Province
- Nickname: 칠성 (Chilsung / The Seven Stars)
- Colors: White, Blue
- March: 7th Division Hymn
- Engagements: 28 battles fought During Korean war; notable battles Battle of YeongCheon
- Decorations: 11 Decorations of Presidential Honour
- Battle honours: Korean War; Operation Pokpoong; Battle of Uijeongbu (1950); Battle of the Pusan Perimeter; Battle of Kyongju; UN offensive into North Korea; Battle of Pyongyang (1950); Second Phase Offensive; Battle of the Ch'ongch'on River; UN Forces retreat from North Korea; First and Second Battles of Wonju; UN May–June 1951 counteroffensive; Battle of Heartbreak Ridge; Battle of Kumsong

Commanders
- Current commander: Maj. Gen. Kim Jin-Ho

The 7th Infantry Division (Korean: 제7보병사단), also known as the "Seven Stars Division" or "Pleiades Division", is a military formation of the Republic of Korea Army, currently employed on patrol duty in the Korean Demilitarized Zone around the mountainous Hwacheon County, Gangwon Province. The division is part of the II Corps. It has a general outpost (GOP) brigade (5th or 8th Brigade), a reserve brigade (3rd Brigade), an artillery brigade, and a subordinate force.

== Structure ==
- Headquarters:
  - Headquarters Company
  - Intelligence Company
  - Air Defense Company
  - Reconnaissance Battalion
  - Engineer Battalion (K1 ARV)
  - Armored Battalion (K1)
  - Signal Battalion
  - Support Battalion
  - Military Police Battalion
  - Medical Battalion
  - Chemical Battalion
- 3rd Infantry Brigade (K105A1 howitzers and 81mm mortars)
- 5th Infantry Brigade (K105A1 howitzers and 81mm mortars)
- 8th Infantry Brigade (K808 APCs, K105A1 howitzers and 81mm mortars)
- Artillery Brigade (K9 Thunder SPHs)

== History ==
During the Korean War, the 7th Infantry Division served a total of 28 battles. In particular, the Yeongcheon at the time to perform on the defense division president received a citation for troops to destroy the two Democratic People's Republic of Korea in battle of the world.

The division started from Youngsan, Seoul on June 10, 1949 and first saw combat on September 14, 1949, in an operation on Jirisan Mt. to fight Communist guerillas. After the fall of Taejon, the division only had a few hundred survivors to participate in the Battle of Pusan Perimeter. During the Battle of Pusan Perimeter, the 7th Infantry Division regrouped with the 3rd, 5th, and 8th infantry regiments to become what formation they have, and destroyed size of two divisions of North Korean army during the Battle of YeongCheon.

On 26 November 1950, a column of retreating ROK Korean soldiers of the ROK 6th and 7th Divisions from Tokchon was attacked by a battalion of the Turkish Brigade who were the first to arrive at Wawon, after the Turks mistook the Koreans for Chinese. 125 Koreans were taken prisoner and many of them were slaughtered by the Turks. The event was wrongly reported in American and European media as a Turkish victory over the Chinese and even after news leaked out about the truth to the Americans, no efforts were made by the media to fix the story.

After the Chinese intervention and attacks in November 1950, the U.S. 2nd Infantry Division, the Turkish Brigade, and the ROK 6th, 7th, and 8th Infantry Divisions suffered substantial loss that they needed extensive rest and refitting to recover combat effectiveness. After recovery, the 7th Division took part in the operation as II Corps's command such as the Retaking of Hwacheon and the Battle of Gumsung.

== Sources ==
- Appleman, Roy E. (2008). Disaster in Korea: The Chinese Confront MacArthur. Vol. 11 of Texas A & M University military history series: Texas A and M University (illustrated ed.). Texas A&M University Press. ISBN 978-1603441285.
- Leckie, Robert (1962). Conflict: The history of the Korean War 1950-1953. G. P. Putnam's Sons., New York. OCLC 964995.
