= 196th Light Combined Arms Brigade =

Brigade of the People's Liberation Army

196th Division (1949–52) 196th Infantry Division (1952–60) 196th Army Division (1960–85) 196th Infantry Division (1985–98) 196th Motorized Infantry Brigade (1998–2017) 196th Light Combined Arms Brigade (2017–)
- Active: 1949.2 - present
- Country: People's Republic of China
- Branch: People's Liberation Army Ground Force, People's Volunteer Army
- Type: Combined Arms
- Size: Brigade
- Part of: 82nd Group Army
- Garrison/HQ: Yangcun, Tianjin (before 2017)
- Engagements: Chinese Civil War, Korean War, Vietnam War, Sino-Vietnamese War

The 196th Light Combined Arms Brigade is a military formation of the People's Liberation Army of the People's Republic of China. It is one of the "showcase" units of the PLA ground force.

The 196th Division (Chinese: 第196师) was created in February 1949 under the Regulation of the Redesignations of All Organizations and Units of the Army, issued by Central Military Commission on November 1, 1948, basing on the 1st brigade, 1st Column of the Huabei Military Region. Its history can be traced to the 1st Independent Brigade of Jinchaji Military Region, formed in August 1946.

The division was a part of the 66th Corps. Under the flag of 196th division it took part in several major battles during the Chinese Civil War.

In October 1950 the division entered Korea along with the Corps and became a part of the People's Volunteer Army (Chinese People's Volunteers (CPV) or Chinese Communist Forces (CCF)) during the Korean War with a standard strength of approximately 10,000 men. The division was then consisting of the 586th, 587th, and 588th Regiments.

In March 1951 the division pulled out from Korea and stationed in Yangcun, Tianjin. The division was the first unit converted to Regular Force in March 1951, the first unit converted to Soviet Equipment Unit in June 1952, and the first unit converted to Chinese equipment in PLA ground force.

In 1952 the division renamed as the 196th Infantry Division (Chinese: 步兵第196师).

576th Artillery Regiment was activated in March 1951 and attached to the division. 4th Independent Tank Regiment of Armored Troops was attached to the division and renamed as Tank Regiment, 196th Division. In July 1953 the regiment was renamed as 401st Tank Self-Propelled Artillery Regiment.

From 1956 the division became a Showcase unit and was opened to foreign media. The division was then composed of:

- 586th Infantry Regiment;
- 587th Infantry Regiment;
- 588th Infantry Regiment;
- 401st Tank Self-Propelled Artillery Regiment;
- 576th Artillery Regiment.

In 1960 the division renamed as the 196th Army Division (Chinese: 陆军第196师).

In January 1961 the division became one of the first ten combat alert divisions of the army, which made it a "big" division under PLA glossaries, as a fully manned and equipped division.

In 1962 the division was designated as a "Northern" unit, Catalogue A. the division was shortly moved to Fujian province for an emergency alert deployment.

In September 1968 its 401st Tank Self-Propelled Artillery Regiment was detached from the division and became 24th Tank Regiment of 6th Tank Division.

In June 1969 576th Artillery Regiment was renamed as Artillery Regiment, 196th Army Division. The division was then composed of:

- 586th Infantry Regiment;
- 587th Infantry Regiment;
- 588th Infantry Regiment;
- Artillery Regiment.

In 1985 the division was transferred to Tianjin Garrison Region following the 66th Army Corps' disbandment, and renamed as the 196th Infantry Division (Chinese: 步兵第196师).

From 1985 to 1998 the division was maintained as a Northern Infantry Division, Catalogue B.

In September 1986, Reconnaissance Company, 196th Infantry Division took part in the Sino-Vietnamese War. For its outstanding performance during its deployment, the company was regarded as "Heroic Reconnaissance Company" in December 1987.

In 1998 the division was reduced and renamed as the 196th Motorized Infantry Brigade (Chinese: 摩托化步兵第196旅).

In September 1999 the brigade was transferred to the 24th Group Army.

In 2003 the brigade was transferred to the 65th Group Army following 24th's disbandment.

In 2017 the brigade was renamed as the 196th Light Combined Arms Brigade (Chinese: 轻型合成第196旅) and transferred to the 82nd Group Army.
