= 114th Armed Police Mobile Division =

114th Division (1948-53) 114th Infantry Division (1953-60) 114th Army Division (1960-85) 114th Infantry Division (1985-96) 114th Armed Police Division (1996-2017)
- Active: 1945-2017
- Country: China
- Branch: People's Armed Police
- Type: Gendarmerie
- Role: Mechanized infantry, Rapid reaction force
- Part of: 1st Mobile Contingent
- Garrison/HQ: Dingzhou, Baoding, Hebei

The People's Republic of China's 114th Division was a division of the People's Armed Police.

== History ==
Originally the unit was the New 111th Division of the North-East Army which fought against the Japanese during the Second Sino-Japanese War, it was later transferred to the Eighth Route Army's Shandong Military Region.

In 1945, it was incorporated into the 1st Detachment of the Northeast Advance Column of the Shandong Military District, after deploying to the Northeast, it was redesignated as the 1st Detachment of the Northeast Advance Column of the Northeast People's Self-Defense Army.

In 1946, it was reorganized into the 19th Brigade of the 7th Column of the Northeast Democratic United Army, and later became the 3rd Division of the 1st Column of the Northeast Democratic United Army. It participated in the Second Chinese Civil War and ultimately became the 114th Division of the 38th Army of the Chinese People's Liberation Army (PLA).

In 1950, the division deployed to Korea with the 38th Army as part of the first wave main combat forces of the People's Volunteer Army (Chinese People's Volunteers (CPV) or Chinese Communist Forces (CCF)).

During the Korean War, The division has a standard strength of approximately 10,000 troops. At that time it consisted of the 340th, 341st, and 342nd Regiments.

It fought the Turkish Brigade at the Battle of Wawon, November 27–29, 1950, and the ROK 9th Infantry Division (South Korea) at the Battle of White Horse Hill in October 1952.

After returning from the Korean War, the formation remained for many years with the 38th Army in the Shenyang Military Region. In February 1967, it was transferred along with the 38th Army to the Baoding region to safeguard Beijing, falling under the command of the Beijing Military Region.

In 1996, as part of the reform of the People's Liberation Army in the 1990s, the 114th (together with 13 other divisions, and some 500,000 personnel) was transferred to the People's Armed Police (PAP), becoming the 114th Armed Police Division, unit number 8640, stationed in Dingzhou, Baoding.

The 114th was chosen to represent the PAP during the 2015 China Victory Day Parade.

After the 2017 reform, the division was divided into two detachments (regiment-sized): the 5th Mobile Detachment (garrison Dingzhou, Hebei) and the 6th Mobile Detachment (garrison Baoding, Hebei) under the PAP 1st Mobile Contingent.

== Units(1996) ==
- 340th Armed Police Regiment (People's Armed Police Unit 8641), garrison Mancheng District, Baoding
- 341th Armed Police Regiment (People's Armed Police Unit 8642), garrison Tang County, Baoding
- 342nd Armed Police Regiment (People's Armed Police Unit 8643), garrison Dingzhou, Baoding
- 703rd Armed Police Regiment (People's Armed Police Unit 8644), garrison Wangdu County, Baoding
- 704th Armed Police Regiment (People's Armed Police Unit 8645), garrison Zhengding County, Shijiazhuang

== See also ==
- ODON
