= Battle of Kumyangjang-ni =

1951 Korean War engagement

- Part of the Operation Thunderbolt in the Korean War
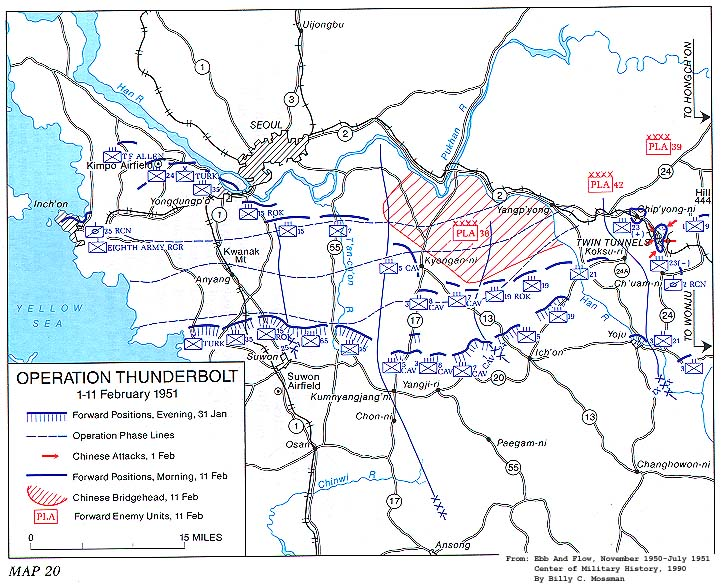
- A map from Operation Thunderbolt after the Battle of Kumyangjang-ni.
Date	25–27 January 1951
Location	Yongin, Gyeonggi, South Korea
Result	United Nations victory

Belligerents
United Nations; Turkey; United States	China

Commanders and leaders
(Turkey) Tahsin Yazıcı (Turkey) Major Kuranel (United States) Artillery officer Barth	(China) Peng Dehuai

Units involved
(Turkey) Turkish Brigade (United States) IX Corps	(China) 150th Division; 447th Regiment; 448th Regiment

Casualties and losses
Turkish sources: 12 killed 31 wounded	Turkish sources: 474 killed 23 captured US sources: 154 killed

The Battle of Kumyangjang-ni was a battle fought on January 25 to 27, 1951, at Kumyangjang-ni (37.235°N 127.2085°E) (present-day Geumyangjang-dong) by the 150th Division of the Chinese People's Volunteer Army (PVA) and the Turkish Brigade of the United Nations Command (UN) forces.

== Background ==
The Turkish Brigade, mobilized to Korea under UN command, initiated combat against the PVA forces in skirmishes referred to as the Battle of Kunu-ri due to the destruction of the II Corps at Wawon on 28 November 1950.

== Operation Thunderbolt ==
UN forces initiated Operation Thunderbolt, a limited counter-offensive between January 25 and February 20, 1951. In accordance with orders received on January 6, 1951, the 2nd Battalion of the Turkish Brigade was ordered to conduct an armed reconnaissance of Kumyangjang-ni and the nearby Hill 151 which were occupied by the PVA.

== Battle ==
After remaining within reserve for 20 days in Cheonan on January 6, 1951, the Turkish Brigade mobilized from Cheonan on January 24 and established an attack to annex a partition of the defensive mobilizations of the PVA forces. They engaged with the PVA 447th and 448th Regiments of the 150th Division defending the vicinity. Initially, the Chinese infantry had the advantage of their hilltop defensive position, however were unable to maintain their superiority.

During the initial stages of the battle, the PVA, already in position, established an effective barrage. However, the Turkish 1st Battalion, previously positioned, advanced toward the Chinese positions unseen and occupied them by utilizing hand grenades. As the Chinese struggled to recuperate the positions in this area, the Turkish 2nd Battalion captured Hill 151 with a bayonet charge. The regimental assault group easily captured the town of Geumyangjang-ri on January 27.

== Aftermath ==
Turkish forces lost 12 deaths and 31 wounded. PVA forces lost 474 killed and 23 prisoners. However, historian Clay Blair reports that US investigations only about 154 Chinese fatalities on the hill, most of them killed by artillery offensives under Barth's authority preceding the Turkish offensive. Following the victory at Kumyangjang-ni, the Turkish Brigade was awarded the Distinguished Unit Citation and an accompanying certificate by a decision of the U.S. Congress. The citation was affixed to the 241st Regiment's standard on June 21, 1951, during a ceremony held for the occasion. Medals and badges were also awarded to those who participated in these battles. Personnel serving alongside the Turkish Brigade, including American liaison officers, Company A of the U.S. 79th Tank Battalion, Company D of the 89th Light Tank Battalion, and the 3rd Platoon of Battery A, 25th Anti-Aircraft Battalion, were also honored with this award. Furthermore, the President of South Korea awarded the Presidential Unit Citation to the Turkish Brigade in recognition of the battles fought between January 25 and 27, 1951.

== See also ==
- Military history of China
- Military history of Turkey
- Military history of the United States

== Bibliography ==
- Stokesbury, James L (1990). A Short History of the Korean War. New York: Harper Perennial. p. 121. ISBN 978-0688095130.
- Villahermosa, Gilberto N. (2011). Honor and Fidelity: The 65th Infantry in Korea, 1950-1953. U.S. Army Center of Military History. p. 82. ISBN 978-0-16-083324-3.
- Mossman, Billy C. (1990). Ebb and Flow, November 1950-July 1951. U.S. Army Center of Military History. pp. 243–244.
- Blair, Clay (1987), The Forgotten War, New York, NY: Times Books, pp. 656–657, ISBN 0-8129-1670-0
- Hou, Xiaomeng (2017). Chu Jian: 1950-1951 (in Chinese). Shanghai: 上海人民出版社. p. 57. ISBN 9787208146273.
- Dora, Celal (1963). Kore Savaşında Türkler 1950-1951 (in Turkish). Istanbul: İsmail Akgün Matbası. pp. 211–212.
- Denizli, Ali (2010). Kore Savaşı uzaklardaki kahramanlar ve zaferleri (in Turkish). Başlık Yayın Grubu. p. 215. ISBN 9786054033089.
- Hannings, Bud (2008). The Korean War An Exhaustive Chronology. McFarland, Incorporated, Publishers. p. 637. ISBN 9780786451074.
