= Chinese Armed Forces =

The Chinese Armed Forces may refer to:

- Armed forces of the People's Republic of China (disambiguation)
  - People's Liberation Army
  - People's Armed Police
  - Militia of China
- Republic of China Armed Forces, the armed forces of the Republic of China based on the island of Taiwan
- National Revolutionary Army (1924–1947) of Kuomintang

== See also ==
- Military history of China
