= Hidayet İpek =

Turkish military officer and politician (1919–2014)

- Born: 1919; Şebinkarahisar, Giresun Province, Turkey
- Died: 25 February 2014 (aged 94–95); Ankara, Turkey
- Military career
- Allegiance: Turkey
- Branch: (Turkey) Turkish Army
- Rank: Colonel
- Commands: Turkish Brigade (Korea)
- Conflicts: Battle of Kunu-ri, Korean War
- Other work: Mayor of Şebinkarahisar; Member of the Grand National Assembly of Turkey (Giresun)

Hidayet İpek (1919 – 25 February 2014) was a Turkish military officer, politician serving as district mayor and parliament member.

== Personal life ==
Hidayet İpek was born in Şebinkarahisar Giresun Province, northern Turkey in 1919. He had six sisters.

== Military career ==
İpek chose the military profession after his two maternal uncles were killed in World War I. He studied at the Kuleli Military High School, and then graduated from the Turkish Military Academy. In 1950, he was deployed to the Korean War with the first unit of the Turkish Brigade, and commanded a company in the rank of a Captain during the Battle of Kunu-ri. In an interview he gave at the Mehmetçik Foundation in May 2011, İpek recounted his memories as follows: "On the morning of 28 November, the enemy launched an attack from the north with large forces. Our unit resisted the enemy forces during these fierce attacks. The enemy, advancing by breaking through the South Korean Corps, could not encircle the United Nations Forces because of our three-day resistance. There were very important, very tough battles. Then we tried to break through the Kunu-ri circle and find the assembly center. Struggling with the cold, hunger, and fatigue, we advanced south and around noon we came across a United States Field Artillery Regiment Headquarters." The region, where he fought, was named "Turksih Fortress" due to the heroism he displayed. After returning home, he served in the Operations Department at the Headquarters of the General Staff of the Turkish Armed Forces. Finally, he retired in the rank of a Colonel.

== Politician career ==
After retirement, İpek entered politics. He was elected district mayor of his hometown Şebinkarahisar. He then ran for a seat in the Grand National Assembly of Turkey, and was elected in the 1969 Turkish general election as a Deputy of Giresun from the Justice Party serving in the 14th Parliament .

== Death ==
İpek was critically injured in an accident at his home in Ankara. He died at the age of 95 on 25 February 2014 in the hospital, where he had been receiving treatment for approximately one month. He was buried at Cebeci Asri Cemetery following memorial ceremonies at the military, in the parliament and the religious service at the Kocatepe Mosque.
