= 89th Medium Tank Battalion (United States) =

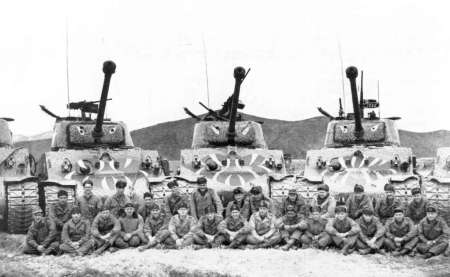
- A group photo of service members within the battalion in Korea, taken in 1950
- Active: 1950–1957
- Disbanded: 1 February 1957
- Country: United States
- Branch: United States Army
- Part of: 25th Infantry Division
- Garrison/HQ: Schofield Barracks
- Nickname: "Rice's Red Devils"
- Motto: “Thrust”
- Equipment: M4A3E8 (76) Sherman
- Engagements: Korean War: Battle of the Pusan Perimeter; Battle of Masan; Battle of Nam River; Battle of Yongyu; Battle of Chongju (1950); Battle of the Ch'ongch'on River; Battle of Kumyangjang-ni; Battle of Surisan (1951); Third Battle of Wonju; Operation Ripper; Battle of Hwacheon
- Decorations: Presidential Unit Citation (2) Navy Unit Commendation

Commanders
- Notable commanders: LtC Welborn Griffin Dolvin

Insignia

The 89th Medium Tank Battalion was an armored tank unit of the United States Army. It was activated in Korea in August 1950 and in November 1951, it was assigned to the 25th Infantry Division. And supported the Eighth Army Ranger Company during Battle of the Ch'ongch'on River. The unit participated in no fewer than ten campaigns, from 1951 through the Armistice in 1953 with the 25th Infantry Division. It earned the Presidential Unit Citation and the Navy Unit Commendation.

The 89th Tank Battalion returned to Hawaii with the 25th Infantry Division where it remained until inactivation in 1957.

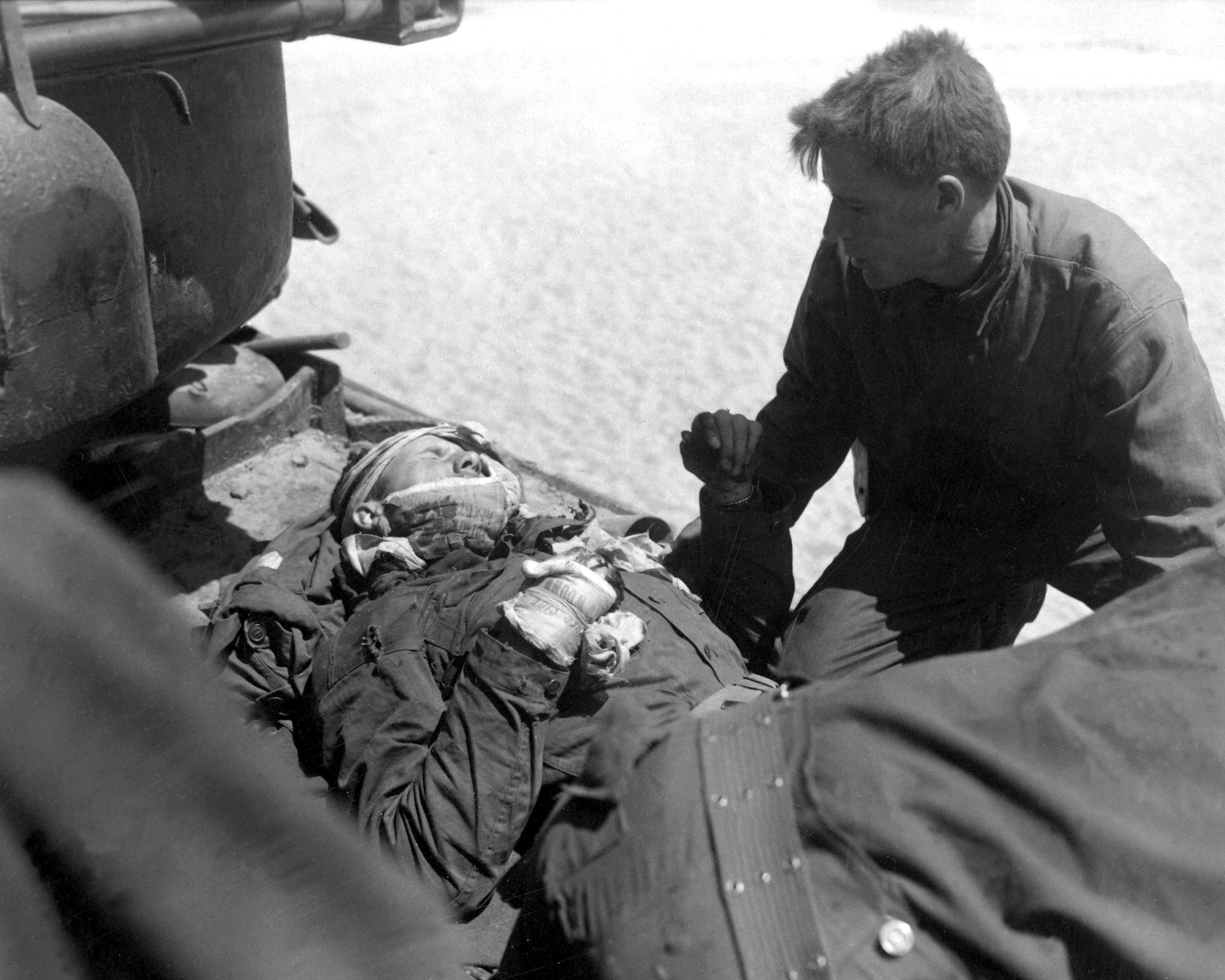
Crew members of Co. D, 89th Tank Bn., give first aid to wounded soldier, during action against the Chinese Communist forces north east of Seoul, Korea. May 1, 1951. Pfc. Charles Fabiszak. (Army)

== History ==
=== Unit origins ===
The unit was created as the 3rd Battalion, 69th Armored Regiment on 15 July 1940 assigned to the 69th Armor Regiment at Fort Knox, the unit would be inactivated on 10 January 1942, it would be re-activated again where it would be reassigned to the 6th Armored Division on 15 February 1942 at the same place until 20 September 1943 when the 69th Armored Regiment was broken up with the 3rd Battalion being re-designated as the 708th Tank Battalion.

Notably the unit was re-designated as the 708th Amphibian Tank Battalion and assigned to the 4th Armored Group under the U.S. Army Forces Pacific, it was then reorganized as the Amphibian Tractor Battalion in Hawaii; the battalion would take part in the seizure of the Marshal Islands from 1–22 February 1944 in support of the 7th Infantry Division and the 27th Infantry Division.

On June 1944 the units name would revert back into the Amphibian Tank Battalion, it would partake in the campaign in capturing Saipan and Tinian islands whilst supporting the 4th Marine Division where the battalion would be awarded the Navy Presidential Unit Citation for their actions and participation of the campaign.

It would also participate in the Invasion of Okinawa in support with the 77th Infantry Division and the 6th Marine Division, it would then earn another Navy Presidential Unit Citation

On 25 January 1946 the 708th was de-activated in the Philippines.

== Re-activation and actions in Korea ==
The battalion was re-activated on the 7 August 1950 and originally designated as the 8072nd Medium Tank Battalion (Later renamed to the 89th at an undated time) in Japan as a direct response to the introduction of North Korean T-34s in the opening days of the Korean War which resulted in high number of casualties of Task Force Smith, the battalion would consist of 54 M4A3E8 (Easy eight) with the improved 76mm gun, refurbished from the Tokyo Ordnance Depot where they would be rushed to Korea in late July 1950, the unit was assigned to the Eighth Army in Korea. Although forced into combat before completing full training, the battalion was bolstered by a core of combat-experienced officers and non-commissioned officers. Prior to the breakout from the Pusan Perimeter, battalion commander Dolvin rotated his companies off the front lines for rest and maintenance. Taking advantage of an administrative mix-up regarding the battalion's official composition, Dolvin temporarily withheld his fourth company, D Company, from combat to conduct additional training before committing them to action on 15 September 1950.

Following the Inchon landings and the subsequent UN breakout, the battalion operated alongside the British 27th Commonwealth Brigade, commanded by Brigadier General Basil Coad. Although nominally under the operational control of the 1st Cavalry Division, the brigade operated largely independently due to the distance separating the formations.

== Awards and commendations ==
Award streamer	Award	Dates	Notes
	Presidential Unit Citation	1-4 September 1950	Battle of Nam River
	Presidential Unit Citation	25-27 January 1951	Wonju-Hwachon
