= Battle of Kunu-ri =

Battle of Kunu-ri may refer to:

- Battle of Wawon (November 27–29, 1950), or Kunuri Muharebeleri (Kunuri Battles) in Turkish
- Battle of the Ch'ongch'on River, November 25 – December 2, 1950
