= South Korea–Turkey relations =

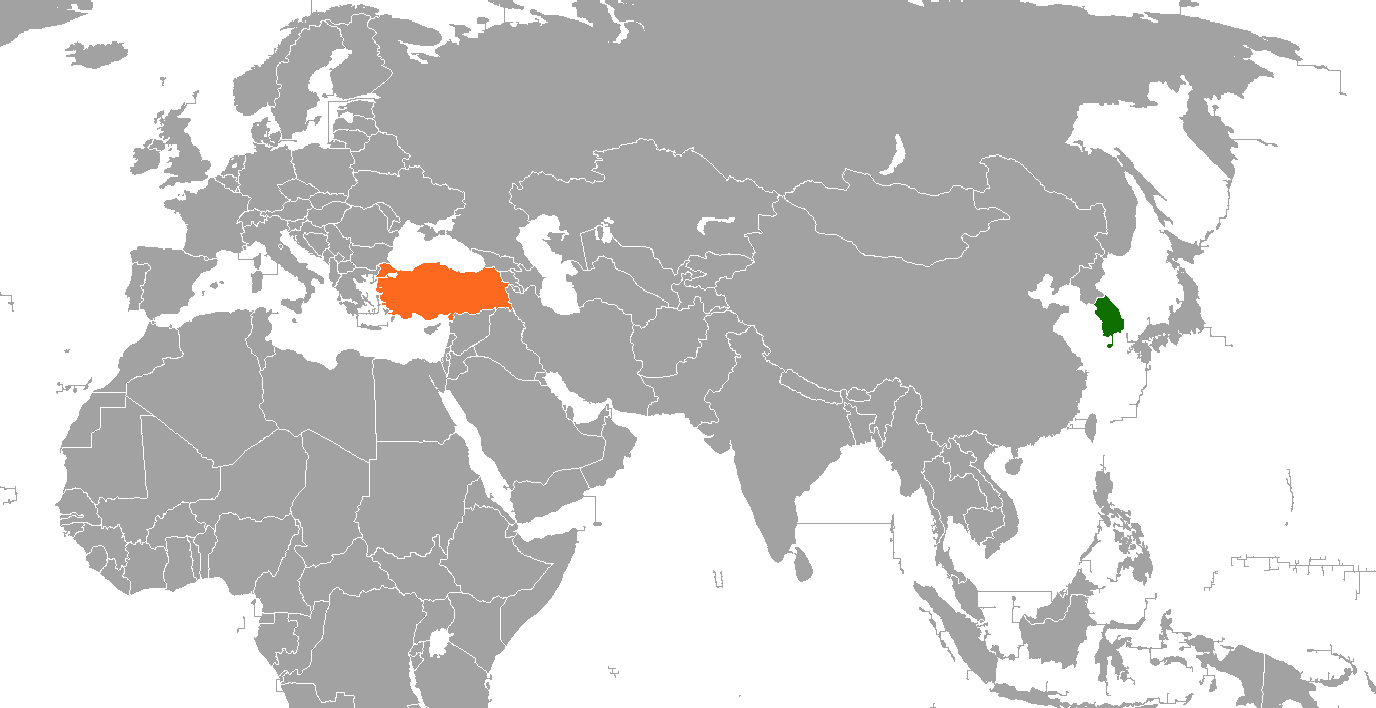
- South Korea: Turkey

Diplomatic mission
- South Korean Embassy, Ankara: Turkish Embassy, Seoul

Envoy
- Ambassador: Ambassador

South Korea–Turkey relations (Korean: 대한민국-튀르키예 관계; Turkish: Güney Kore-Türkiye ilişkileri) are the foreign relations between South Korea and Turkey. The Turkish embassy is in Seoul, while the South Korean embassy in Ankara and a consulate general in Istanbul. Both countries are members of the G20.

== History ==
Early contact can be traced back to antiquity, when the Göktürks had supported ancient Goguryeo, a Korean kingdom, during their expansion and also assisted them against Tang Chinese forces. As both Göktürks and Goguryeo were threatened by the Tang dynasty of China, they formed a political, economic, and military alliance. Göktürk soldiers assisted Goguryeo in many battles, including in the war against Silla, another Korean kingdom, and Tang China; this alliance went on extended to the Balhae as well. Commerce and correspondence was also maintained through the ancient Silk Road after a part of the ancient Oghuz Turks migrated westward and settled in the lands of Anatolia (today Turkey).

These relations can be largely traced to the formation of the South Korean nation, when Turkey, namely the Turkish Brigade, had supported South Koreans against North Korean and Chinese forces at the Korean War. Of the 721 Turkish soldiers who fell in the war, 462 were buried at the United Nations Memorial Cemetery (Heroes' Cemetery) in Busan. Based on those mutual gestures and acts of ancient friendship, the relationship between the two nations is often referred as "Korean–Turkish brotherhood" (Turkish: Kore–Türk kardeşliği; Korean: 한국 – 터키 우정).

Participation of Turkish troops in the Korean War (June 25, 1950 – July 27, 1953) led to the formation of an alliance between South Korea and Turkey. After the government of Republic of Korea was announced on August 15, 1948, Turkey, in 1949, was the 10th country to recognize the South Korean government as the only legitimate government on the Korean Peninsula. Turkey was the third country to establish a permanent embassy in South Korea after the United States and Republic of China and South Korea established its seventh diplomatic mission in Turkey. The 50th anniversary of the establishment of diplomatic relations between South Korea and Turkey occurred in 2007 and 2010 marked the 60th anniversary of participation of Turkish troops in the Korean War.

Turkish troops withdrew from Korea during the 1970s and then the focus of relationship between the two countries moved from military to economy and commerce. In 1971 a sister city agreement was reached between Seoul and Ankara and a Korean Park was built in Ankara, and in 1973 a Korean War memorial monument was erected in the park. In 1974 the Korea Trade Center or KOTRA opened an office in Istanbul.

== Economic relations ==
In 2013, both countries entered into a free trade agreement.

The two countries signed an agreement on trade promotion and economic technical corporation in 1977. The visits of Turkish president in 1982 and the prime minister's visit in 1986 gave great importance to economic cooperation with Korea after their accelerated economic growth and Turkey chose to emulate Korea's economic model and called it the "Korean model", it was during this time that many business-related visits occurred from Turkey to Korea to learn Korea's economy development.

The first official Korea-Turkey Joint Economy committee meeting was held in Ankara in 1981 and the private level Korea-Turkey Business Council was established in 1987 and the first meeting was held in Istanbul, in 1989 when both Korea and Turkey were searching for new markets to export their products. In the mid 1980s Korean companies began investing in Turkey and Turkey's domestic market became a gateway to Europe and the Middle East for Korean businesses.

The first investment from Korea came in 1987 when GoldStar created a joint investment company with Vestel and began manufacturing microwave ovens and color TV's at a factory in Manisa. The same year Samsung Electronics collaborated with Tatış Holding and manufactured color TV's and video cassette players at a factory in İzmir. They were followed by LG Electronics, Hyundai, Daewoo, and others. Hyundai Motor Company began to export vehicles to Turkey in 1990 and constructed an automobile factory in İzmit in 1995.

The trade volume between the two countries was only $8,000 U.S. dollars in 1965; in 1970 it increased to $59,000; in 1980 it was already $63 million; in 1990 it neared to $515 million; in 2007 it was over $4 billion US dollars.

The defense industry cooperation also increased between the two countries. Starting in 1980s. Korean firms lead several Turkish defense programs including the manufacturing of the T-155 Fırtına howitzers and a main battle tank, and training aircraft worth billions of dollars.

South Korean and Turkish construction firms came together to build Çanakkale 1915 Bridge, a 2,023 m (6,637 ft), $2.8 billion suspension bridge to span the Dardanelles, Turkey. The Export–Import Bank of Korea will provide the export credit agency portion of the financing for the project.

== Military cooperation ==
The Altay tank, a newly military tank of the Turkish Armed Forces, was supported by Hyundai Rotem with technical support and assistance.

== Nuclear cooperation ==
On 3 November 2026, Erdoğan and South Korean Presiden Lee Jae-myung met for a presidential summit in Seoul to support South Korean where they agreed and signed a nuclear power project financing memorandum of understanding for South Korea's participation in Turkey's planned Sinop nuclear power plant.

== See also ==
- Foreign relations of South Korea
- Foreign relations of Turkey
- List of ambassadors of Turkey to South Korea
