= Turkish Brigade =

UN military unit of the Korean War

Turkish Brigade North Star
- Şimal Yıldızı / Kutup Yıldızı
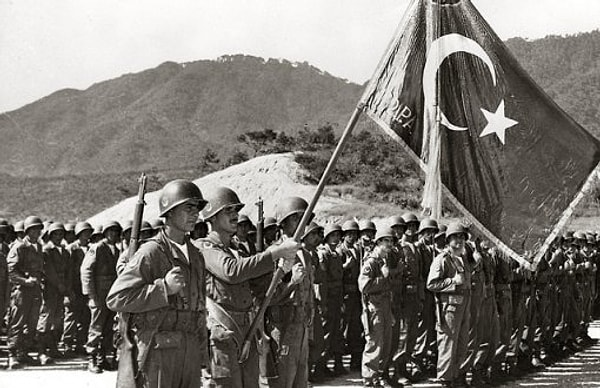
- TAF soldiers of the brigade.
- Active: 1950–1960
- Country: Turkey
- Allegiance: United Nations Command
- Type: Infantry
- Role: Defending South Korea during the Korean War
- Size: 14,936 troops (lifetime); 5,455 (average)
- Part of: 25th Infantry Division
- Engagements: Korean War; Battle of the Ch'ongch'on River; Battle of Wawon; Second Phase Offensive; Operation Thunderbolt (1951); Battle of Kumyangjang-ni; Bayonet Charge at Hill 151; Chinese spring offensive; Battle of the Nevada Complex; Third Battle of the Hook
- Decorations: Presidential Unit Citation (ROK); Presidential Unit Citation (USA)

Commanders
- Notable commanders: Brigadier General Tahsin Yazıcı (1950 – November 16, 1951); Assistant: Celâl Dora; Chief of Operations: Faik Türün; Namık Arguç (– August 20, 1952); Assistant: Nuri Pamir (June 5, 1952 †); Sırrı Acar (July 6, 1953)

Insignia
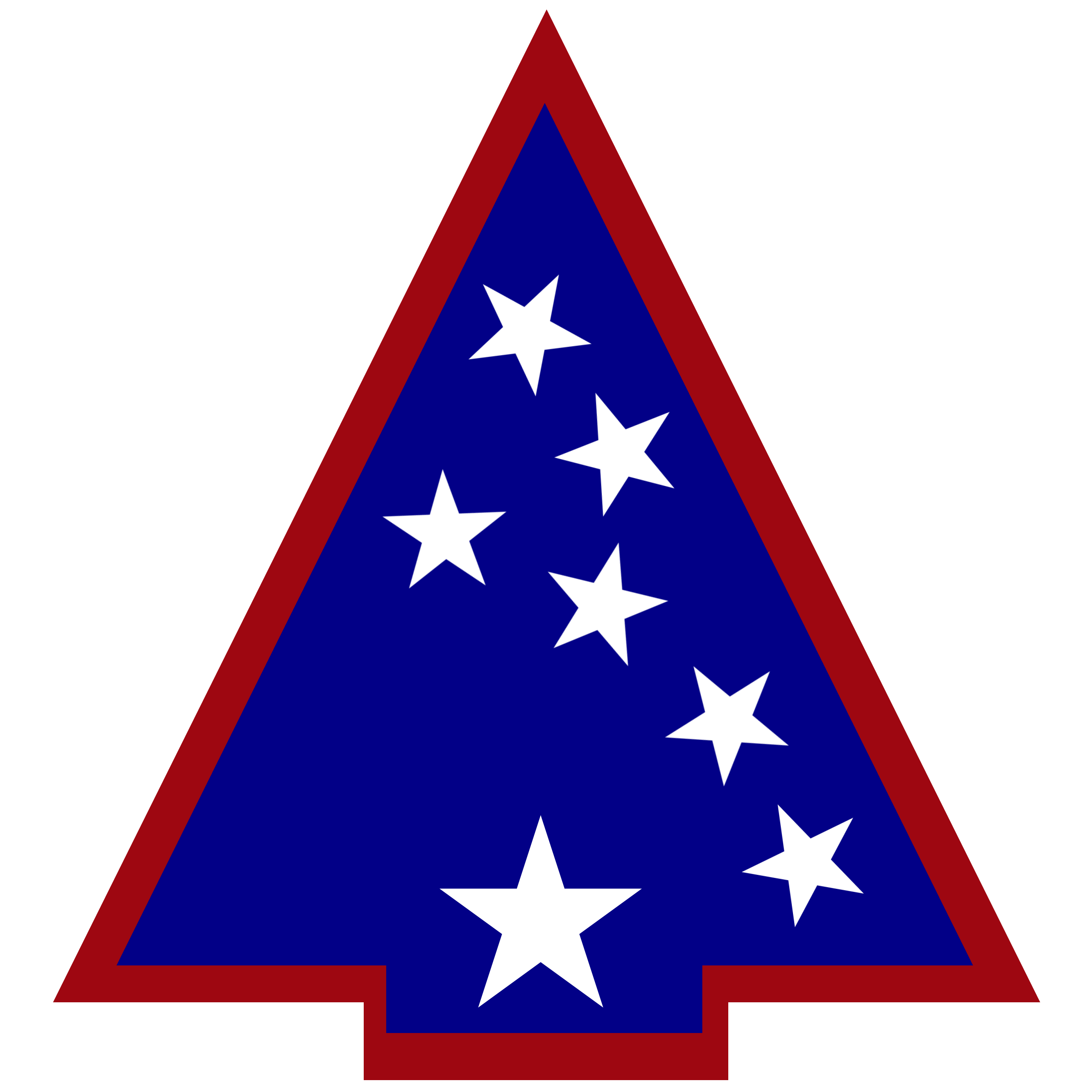
- Identification symbol

The Turkish Brigade, codenamed North Star (Turkish: Şimal Yıldızı or Kutup Yıldızı), was a military formation from Turkey that served under the United Nations Command during the Korean War.

Turkey was one of the 22 countries that contributed manpower to the United Nations in support of South Korea and one of the 16 countries that deployed military personnel to help in the fight against North Korea, which had precipitated the conflict by invading South Korea with support from the Soviet Union and the People's Republic of China. The brigade's first 5,000 Turkish troops arrived on 19 October 1950, shortly after the outbreak of hostilities in June of that year, and remained in varying strengths until the summer of 1954. Attached to the 25th Infantry Division of the United States, the Turkish Brigade was the only military formation of its size to have been permanently attached to an American military division for the duration of the Korean War.

Turkey's United Nations troops took part in several engagements of the conflict; the Turkish Brigade is most notable for its involvement in the Battle of Wawon, where its fierce resistance proved to be decisive in delaying the advance of the Chinese military, which had entered as a direct combatant after the North Korean military was effectively destroyed upon being expelled from South Korean territory by the United Nations military coalition. For its efforts, the Turkish Brigade was honoured with Unit Citations from South Korea and the United States, subsequently developing a reputation for its fighting ability, stubborn defense, mission commitment, and bravery.

== Background ==
On 29 June 1950, the Republic of Turkey replied to the United Nations Resolution 83 requesting military aid to South Korea, following the attack by North Korea on 25 June. The cable stated: "Turkey is ready to meet his responsibilities." On 25 July 1950, Turkey decided to send a brigade, comprising three infantry battalions, an artillery battalion and auxiliary units, to fight under UN Command against North Korea and subsequently the People's Republic of China. Turkey was the second country to answer the UN call, after the United States.

Members of the Turkish Brigade move into position in December 1950, shortly after suffering severe casualties attempting to block encirclement of the U.S. 2nd Division at the Chongchon river in North Korea.

Three different Turkish Brigades served in the Korean War. The core of the 1st Turkish Brigade was the 241st Infantry Regiment based at Ayaş, which was supplemented with volunteers to raise it to brigade level. Brigadier General Tahsin Yazıcı, a veteran of the Gallipoli campaign, commanded the 1st Brigade.

The 1st Turkish Brigade consisted of three battalions, commanded by Major Imadettin Kuranel, Major Mithat Ulunu, and Major Lutfu Bilgon. The Turkish Armed Forces Command (TAFC) was a regimental combat team with three infantry battalions, along with supporting artillery and engineers. It was the only brigade-sized unit attached permanently to a U.S. division throughout the Korean War.

Brigadier General Tahsin Yazıcı was highly regarded in the Turkish military establishment. He stepped down a rank in order to command the first contingent of Turks in the Korean War. While there were cultural and religious differences between Turkish and American troops, both were disciplined forces capable of adapting. However, there was a language barrier that was more difficult to overcome. General Yazıcı did not speak English, and Americans had overlooked the difficulty the language barrier would present.

The brigade had a full turnover after a period of one year's service. During the service of the 3rd Brigade in 1953, the Korean Armistice was signed. Thereafter, Turkey continued maintaining forces at full brigade level for another seven years, in accordance with United Nations agreements. Kenan Evren, the seventh President of the Republic of Turkey, served in the Brigade from 1958 until 1959.

The advance party of the Turkish Brigade arrived in Pusan on 12 October 1950. The main body arrived five days later, October 17 from the eastern Mediterranean port of Iskenderun, Turkey, and the brigade went into bivouac near Taegu where it underwent training and received U.S. equipment. The brigade was attached to the U.S. 25th Infantry Division.

United Nations Forces Commander in Chief, General Douglas MacArthur, described the Turkish Brigade's contribution to the war:

The military situation in Korea is being followed with concern by the whole American public. But in these concerned days, the heroism shown by the Turks has given hope to the American nation. It has inculcated them with courage. The American public fully appreciates the value of the services rendered by the Turkish Brigade and knows that because of them the Eighth American Army could withdraw without disarray. The American public understands that the United Nations Forces in Korea were saved from encirclement and from falling into the hands of the communists by the heroism shown by the Turks.

The Turkish Brigade, between November 1950 and July 1953, fought in the following battles:

- Battle of Kunuri (27–29 November 1950)
- Battle of Kumyangjang-ni & Hill 151 (January 1951)
- 22–23 April 1951; the Chorwon-Seoul diversion; the Taegyewonni defense; the Barhar-Kumhwa attacks; and
- Battle of the Nevada Complex (25–29 May 1953).

On 26 November 1950, a column of retreating ROK (South Korean) soldiers of the ROK 6th and 7th Divisions from Tokchon was attacked by a battalion of Turks who were the first to arrive at Wawon, after the Turks mistook the Koreans for Chinese. One hundred twenty-five South Koreans were taken prisoner and some were killed by the Turks. Due to false intelligence, the Turks were expecting an encounter with Chinese forces somewhere on the road. The event was wrongly reported in American and European media as a Turkish victory over the Chinese and even after news leaked out about the truth to the Americans, no efforts were made by the media to fix the story. The next day on 27 November, east of Wawon, leading Turkish party was ambushed by Chinese and suffered a major defeat, with heavy casualties suffered by the Turks. Survivors of the leading Turkish party appeared in the zone of the American 38th Infantry north and northwest of the Wawon road the next day. The Turks lost most of their equipment, vehicles, and artillery and sustained casualties of up to 1,000 dead or wounded after fighting with the Chinese forces with superior numbers around the Kaechon and Kunu-ri area, and the Tokchon-Kunu-ri road. Although the Turkish Brigade was cut off when they were encircled by Chinese regiments, they were still be able to breach the Chinese trap and rejoin the US 2nd Infantry Division. Delay of Chinese troops advance after meeting with heavy Turkish resistance, helped United Nations forces to withdraw without suffering many casualties and reassemble later in December. After Battle of Wawon, Turks were sent to assist the South Korean ROK II Corps. Later in December, General Tahsin Yazıcı and fifteen Turkish officers and men of his command were decorated by General Walton Walker with Silver Star and Bronze Star medals for their bravery against Chinese during Battle of Wawon.

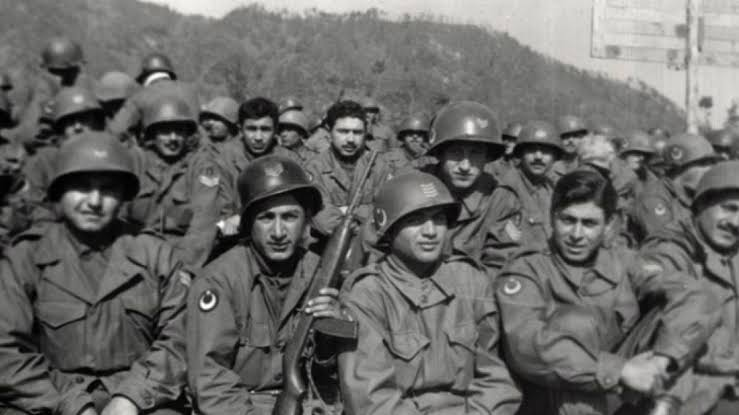
An iconic footage of TAF soldiers during the war

The Turkish Brigade had never before engaged in combat on foreign soil. They engaged in intense melee combat with the Chinese at the Battle of Wawon on 28 November and the survival of the US Eighth Army is attributed by UN commanders to the Turkish Brigade keeping the Chinese engaged for three days. On 29 November, the Turks were expelled by the Chinese from Sinnim-ni and were forced to retreat in complete disarray to Pyongmyong-ni and Kunu-ri. The Turkish Brigade's commanding General Tahsin Yazıcı said during the battle of Wawon – "Why retreat? We're killing Chinese!". The Chinese defeat of the Turks at Pongmyong-ni resulted in havoc since the retreat of the Turks exposed the right flank of the American 38th infantry, and the disarrayed mass of retreating Turks stopped the 1st Battalion from taking their place at the 38th infantry's flank after Colonel George B. Peploe commanded them to cover the exposed flank. Clay Blair noted that in reality, the Eighth Army was left completely unprotected on its right flank due to the Turkish retreat, describing them as "overrated, poorly led green troops" who "broke and bugged out", despite both Chinese and American sources stating otherwise. American Colonel Paul Freeman, said that the Turks had a "look at the situation...and they had no stomach for it, and they were running in all directions," and yet Freeman contentiously withdrew his own regiment, thereby exposing the rear of the US 2nd Infantry Division to Chinese attack. However, historian Bevin Alexander noted that given the Turkish Brigade was the only UN force present between Wawon and Kunu-ri, the Chinese inability to capture Kunu-ri before the US 2nd Infantry Division meant the Turks had fulfilled their original mission and covered the withdrawal of the US IX Corps successfully. Chinese sources also note that the resistance from the much smaller Turkish force was so unexpectedly stubborn, the 340th regiment had to be called to reinforce the 342nd, which was locked in a stalemate.

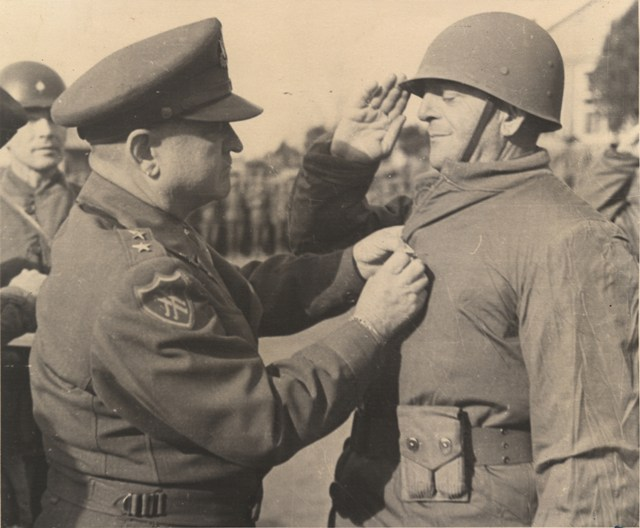
Brig. Gen. Tahsin Yazıcı receiving the Silver Star from Lt. Gen. Walton Harris Walker in honour of the Turkish Brigade's actions during the Battle of Wawon, 15 December 1950

The brigade's most costly battle was Kunu-ri, which took place towards the end of 1950. Actually a series of four encounters lasting from 26 November to 6 December 1950; Battle of Wawon on 28 November, Sinnim-ni, 28–29 November, Kunuri Gorge, 29–30 November, and Sunchon Gorge on 30 November 1950. The brigade lost over 15% of its personnel and 70% of equipment at Kunuri, with 218 killed and 455 wounded, and close to 100 taken prisoner.

Along with the rest of the United Nations forces, Turkish Brigade was named as one of the units which required "rest and refitting" after being exhausted by the fighting in November 1950.

After the Battle of Kumyangjang-ni & Hill 151, 25–26 January 1951, in which the Turkish Brigade repulsed a Chinese force three times its size, although the Turkish brigade was decimated by repeated determined attacks by North Koreans and Chinese since it did not coordinate with any American units, President Harry Truman signed a Distinguished Unit Citation (now the Presidential Unit Citation) on 11 July 1951. The brigade was also awarded the Presidential Unit Citation from the President of Korea.

== Composition ==
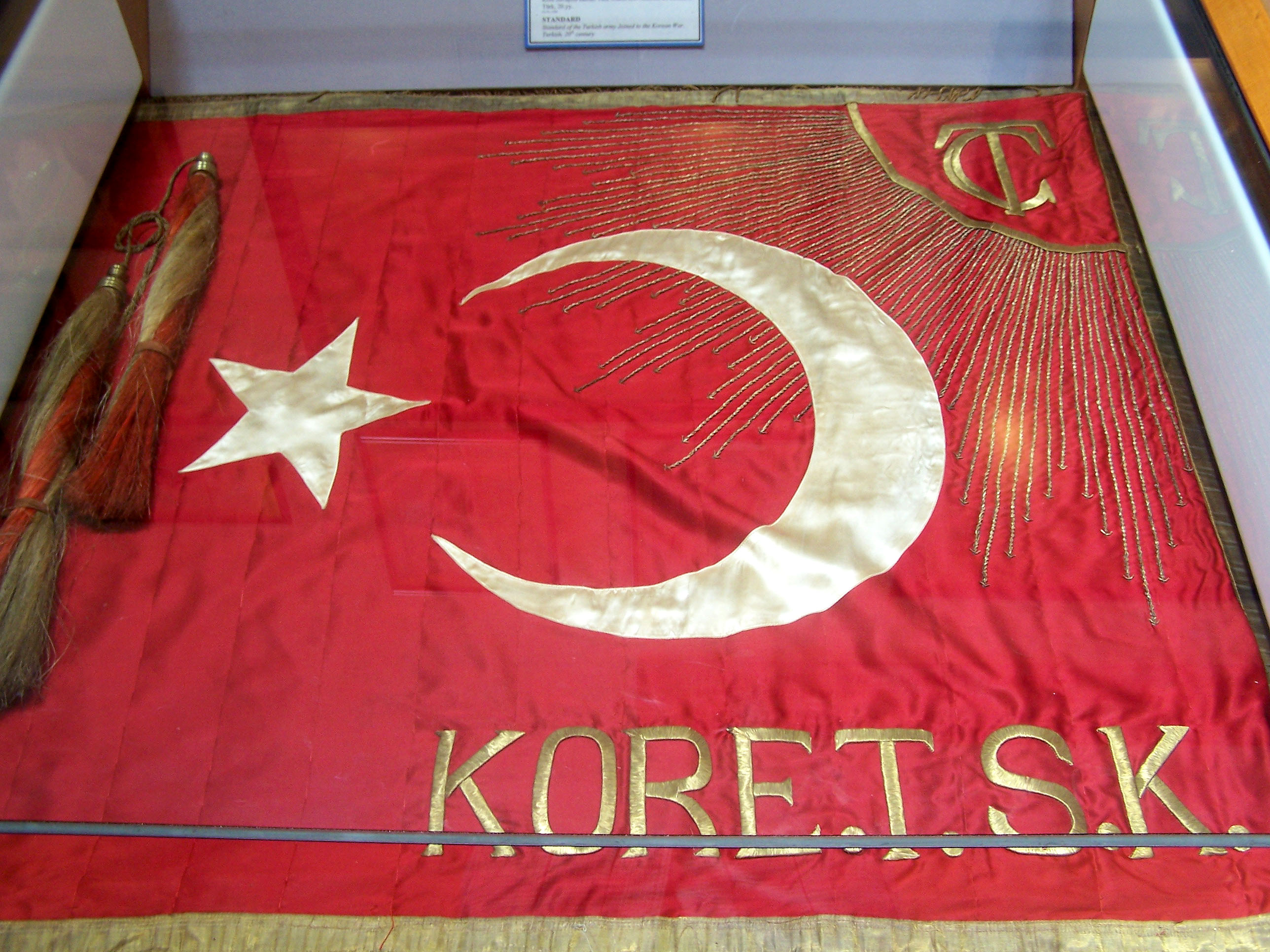
Standard of Turkish Armed Forces in the Korean War in Istanbul Military Museum in Şişli, Istanbul.

The Turkish Armed Forces Command (TAFC) was a regimental combat team with three infantry battalions, along with supporting artillery and engineers. The three battalions were commanded by Major Imadettin Kuranel, Major Miktat Uluünlü, and Major Lütfü Bilgin. It was the only brigade-sized UN unit attached permanently to a U.S. division throughout the Korean War.

The Turkish Brigade comprised:

- 241st Infantry Regiment, composed of three Infantry Battalions
- Motorized Field Artillery Battalion, composed of three Howitzer Batteries and a Headquarters Battery. Each Howitzer Battery consisted of six 105 mm guns
- Motorized Engineering Company
- Motorized Anti-Aircraft Battery
- Transportation Truck Company
- Motorized Signal Platoon
- Motorized Anti-Tank Platoon
- Medical Company
- Repair and Maintenance Unit
- Military Band
- Replacement Company, composed of various branch and non-commissioned officers, and soldiers, such as Infantry, Artillery, Signal, Engineering, etc.

=== Casualties ===
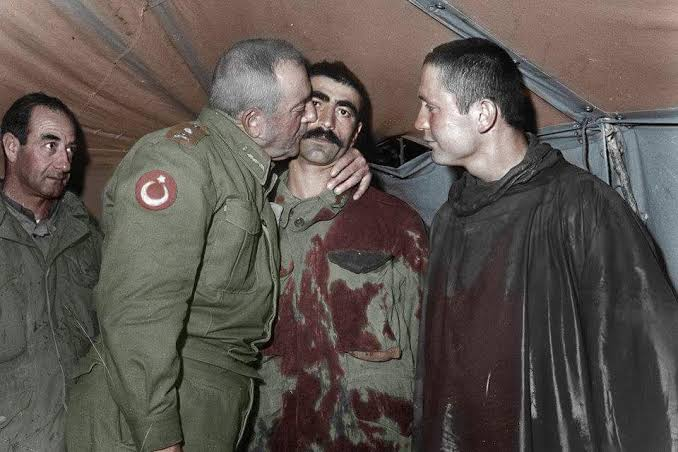
Aftermath of a bayonet charge.

Overall losses for the Turkish Brigade in Korea were 721 killed in action, 2,111 wounded and 168 missing. Among the losses was the sole Turkish pilot, Muzaffer Erdönmez, who piloted a US B-26 and was shot down over Wonch Ang-nı while bombing the railroad tracks. A total of 14,936 men served in the brigade between 1950 and 1953 with about 5,455 soldiers in Korea at any one time. The United Nations Memorial Cemetery in Busan, South Korea is the burial place for 462 of those casualties. Two memorials to the Turkish soldiers are at the cemetery.

== In popular culture ==
The Turkish communist poet Nazım Hikmet opposed the Korean War and Turkey's participation in it. After the Senate address of John Foster Dulles, who served as U.S. Secretary of State under President Dwight D. Eisenhower, where he said that the Turkish soldiers in the Brigade were paid 23 cents a month compared with $70 a month for American soldiers, Hikmet wrote a poem criticising the war and America called "On the Soldier worth 23 cents".

In 1954, a Turkish film bearing the operation code name of the Turkish Brigade (Şimal Yıldızı), directed by Atıf Yılmaz and starring Ayhan Işık, which praised the deeds of the unit was released.

The Turkish Brigade is featured in the Unification Church-funded 1982 film Inchon, which inaccurately depicts the unit being involved in the Battle of Inchon (in reality the Brigade did not arrive until the month after the battle). Gabriele Ferzetti plays the commander of the Brigade.

The seventh President of Turkey, Kenan Evren, had served in Korea in the Turkish Brigade, 1958–1959.

In the 1974 M*A*S*H episode "A Full Rich Day", Hawkeye records a letter to his dad detailing the exploits of a mad Turkish soldier, and other events. In the 1978 episode "Post Op", a truck full of Turkish soldiers arrives. Thankful to the 4077th for taking care of their captain, they all volunteered to donate much needed blood.

The 2017 Turkish film Ayla: The Daughter of War is based on the true story of a young war orphan nursed back to health from near-death by a sergeant in the Turkish Brigade but torn apart from him when he was unable to take her back to Turkey at the end of the war, and their reunion sixty years later.

== See also ==
- United Nations Forces in the Korean War
- Medical support in the Korean War
- South Korea–Turkey relations
- Hidayet İpek (1919–2014), Captain
- Tahsin Yazıcı (1892–1971), General
