= List of ambassadors of Turkey to South Korea =

Ambassador of Turkey to South Korea
- 주한 튀르키예 대사
- National Emblem of Turkey
- Incumbent; Salih Murat Tamer since 13 September 2022
- Inaugural holder: Kamil İdil
- Formation: 30 September 1957; 68 years ago

The ambassador of Turkey to South Korea is the official representative of the president and the government of the Republic of Turkey to the president and government of the Republic of Korea. The position is held by Salih Murat Tamer since 13 September 2022.

== List of ambassadors ==
Ambassador	Term start	Term end	Ref.
Kamil İdil	30 September 1957	20 October 1959	
Hikmet Hayri Anıl	30 April 1960	14 December 1963	
Bülent Görkem	15 December 1963	7 July 1964	
Okan Gezer	8 July 1964	30 September 1966	
Şarık Arıyak	1 October 1966	13 April 1967	
Bülent Kestelli	14 April 1967	7 June 1971	
Yücel Ayaslı	7 June 1971	30 May 1972	
Melih Erçin	31 May 1972	30 June 1980	
Erdil Akay	8 July 1980	19 April 1982	
Bedrettin Tunabaş	23 April 1982	16 November 1984	
Metin Sirman	23 November 1984	16 December 1986	
Yunus Güçel	29 December 1986	24 February 1989	
Muammer Akçer	11 March 1989	24 December 1990	
Turhan Fırat	25 December 1990	16 March 1994	
Kaya G. Toperi	15 June 1994	30 April 1996	
Halil Dağ	16 October 1996	1 November 2000	
Tomur Bayer	16 November 2000	4 January 2003	
Selim Kuneralp	15 January 2003	17 December 2005	
Deniz Özmen	31 December 2005	30 September 2009	
Erdoğan Şerif İşcan	13 November 2009	5 May 2011	
Naci Sarıbaş	15 June 2011	16 December 2013	
Arslan Hakan Okçal	1 January 2014	20 December 2017	
Durmuş Ersin Erçin	1 January 2018	10 September 2022	
Salih Murat Tamer	13 September 2022	Present	

== See also ==
- South Korea–Turkey relations
