= Military history of Turkey =

This military history of Turkey is the history of the armed forces established under Turkey, beginning with the Turkish War of Independence.

== War of Independence ==
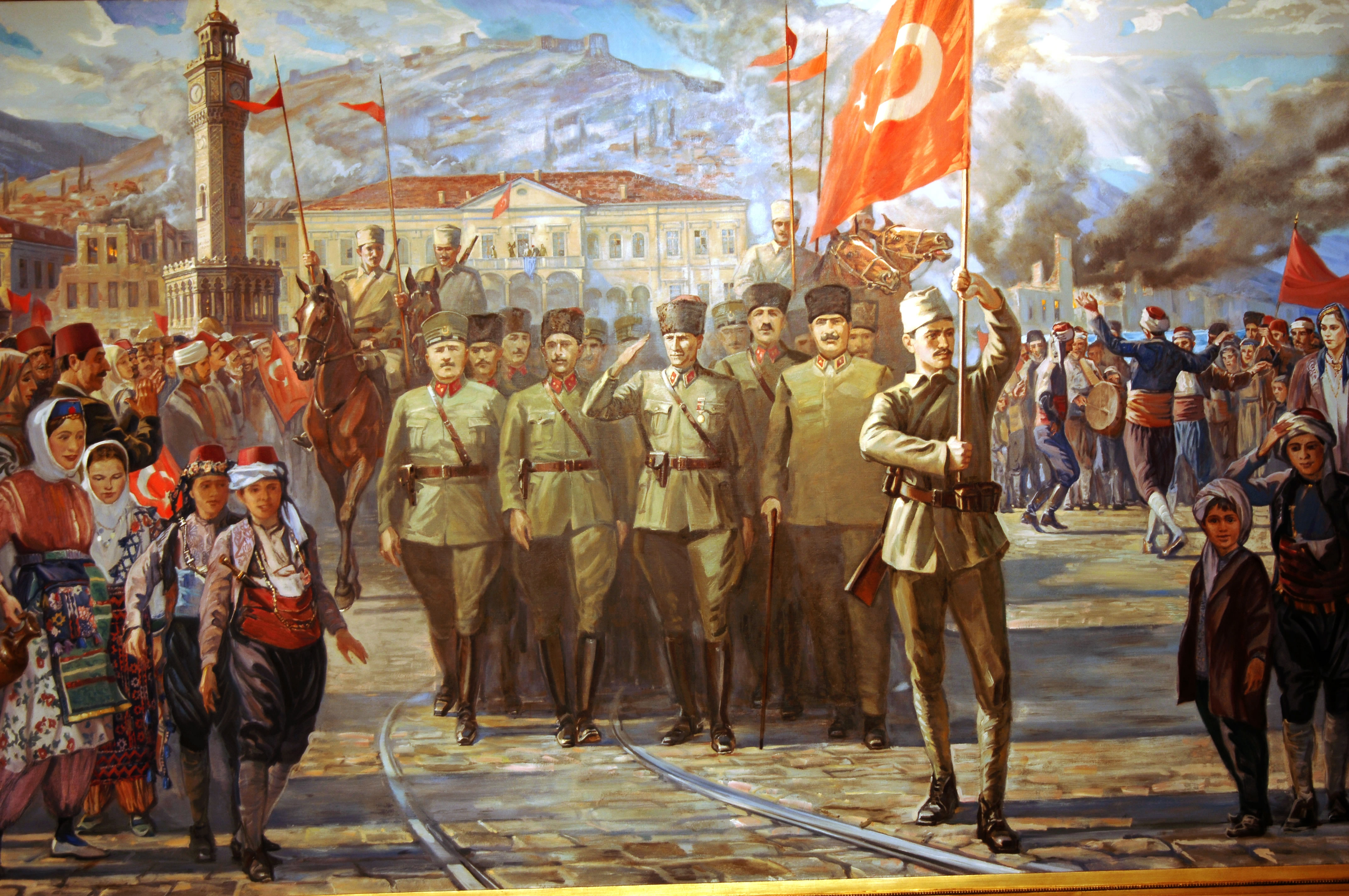
The Liberation of Izmir in 1922 effectively sealed the Turkish victory and ended the Turkish War of Independence.

The Turkish revolutionaries rejected the Treaty of Sèvres (1920), which had left the Ottoman government in control of substantially less of Anatolia than modern Turkey controls. Following the victory of Atatürk's forces in the War of Independence, the Treaty of Sèvres was substituted with the Treaty of Lausanne (1923), which granted international recognition to the government of Ankara, rather than the Ottoman government in Istanbul.

== Turkey’s Soviet tanks ==
In 1932, the Soviet Union sent two T-26 Mod. 1931s (equipped with two 7.62mm machinegun turrets), four T-27 tankettes, and many vehicles and motorcycles to the Turkish Army in order to increase its part of the arms market and expand the USSR's influence beyond its vast borders. The Soviet Union hoped that favourable experiences with the given AFVs would lead to the Turkish Army placing a significant order for Soviet weaponry equipment. This strategy paid off, as Turkey ordered 64 T-26 Mod. 1933s, one T-37A, and 34 BA-3 armoured cars in 1934. The T-26s were the Turkish Army's first genuine tanks, serving with the newly formed 1st Tank Regiment of the 2nd Cavalry Division in Lüleburgaz, on the border with Greece. Despite being quickly supplemented by a number of Vickers Mk VI light tanks from the United Kingdom and 100 French Renault R-35s that arrived in Turkey in 1940, the T-26's relatively powerful penetration capabilities ensured they remained the most capable tanks in Turkish service until the arrival of the first Valentine tanks from the United Kingdom in 1941. The 1st Tank Regiment at the time was made up of the 102nd and 103rd Tank Divisions, as well as a Reserve Division. The BA-3s were divided into two divisions: the 1st and 2nd Armoured Car Divisions. The T-26 Mod. 1931s and T-27s formed a Mixed Tank Company and were primarily used to familiarize troops with tanks (a single FT-17 was bought from France in 1928 for the similar purpose) and demonstrate tank effectiveness to other army formations. This structure is thought to have stayed unchanged until the last T-26s and BA-3s were retired in 1943.

Because Turkey remained neutral during WWII until February 1945, the Soviet-delivered T-26s and BA-3s would never see combat against a foreign foe. Nonetheless, these Soviet AFVs laid the groundwork for tank operations in the Turkish Army, a fact that is seldom understood even now. This information is probably even more strange in light of the fact that 20 years after its delivery, there was no sign of Soviet weapons systems remaining in Turkey, with the country instead receiving vast numbers of US tanks for possible use in a battle against the USSR.

Unlike the T-26, the amphibious light tank design was not well received by the Turkish Army, and no additional T-37As were ever ordered. The tank, armed with only a single 7.62mm DT machine gun and weakly armoured (3mm to 10mm at the front), offered few remarkable features aside from its amphibious capability. Nonetheless, the Soviet Army found the concept well-suited to their doctrine, purchasing over 2500 T-37As, another 1300+ T-38s, and 350+ T-40s in the 1930s. The tankette concept was also rejected by Turkish Army leadership, and aside from the four prototypes supplied by the Soviets, Turkey made no attempt to obtain further T-27s or contemporary designs from other sources. Of course, after WWII, the tankette concept was generally abandoned (with the noteworthy exception of the German Wiesel), and their intended mission of reconnaissance was instead filled by light tanks and armoured cars. None of the Turkish T-37As or T-27s survive today, having most likely been demolished by the late 1940s.

The BA-3 armoured car was only marginally more popular than the T-27 and T-37A, owing mostly to its heavy armament of a single 45mm gun and one 7.62mm DT MG placed in the same turret as the T-26 (a second DT was located in the hull). The type's low mobility was a key disadvantage, and operations were frequently limited to hard surfaces due to its substantial weight, however tracks could be attached to the rear wheels for slightly increased mobility in rough terrain. The BA-3's hull armour was 9mm thick, providing all-around protection.

In comparison to the typically decades-long career of modern tanks, which for some Leopard 2 MBTs is already more than 40 years, Turkey's T-26s survived fewer than ten years (which is still considerably over the average tank's longevity of this era). The tanks began to wear out by the early 1940s, and their bad condition was aggravated by a dearth of spare parts, which could no longer be obtained from the war-torn Soviet Union. All T-26s had previously been decommissioned from operational service by 1943. Two T-26 Mod. 1933s remain in the gardens of the Harbiye Military Museum in Istanbul and the Etimesgut Tank Müzesi in Ankara, albeit without their original camouflage scheme.

For a country that currently employs a considerable number of German and American-made tanks, the founding of a tank arm (and, indeed, its first tank regiment) equipped with Soviet-made tanks is a historical oddity. Turkey is the only country in the world to have operated tanks from practically every major player in World War II, including the Soviet Union, the United Kingdom, the United States, Germany, and France. Little evidence of this past remains, save for the efforts of historians and writers to preserve and restore what would otherwise be lost.

== World War II ==
In 1938, the Turkish Army at peacetime strength consisted of 174,000 soldiers and 20,000 officers forming 11 army corps, 23 divisions, one armoured brigade, 3 cavalry brigades and 7 frontier commands. Like most nations at the time it was ill-equipped with primarily World War I era weapons. The rifles used were a mixture including Mausers, Mannlichers, Lee–Enfields, Martinis, Lebels and others. As late as February 1940, the British Foreign Office noted: "The Turkish Army is very short of rifles and has asked us to supply 150,000."

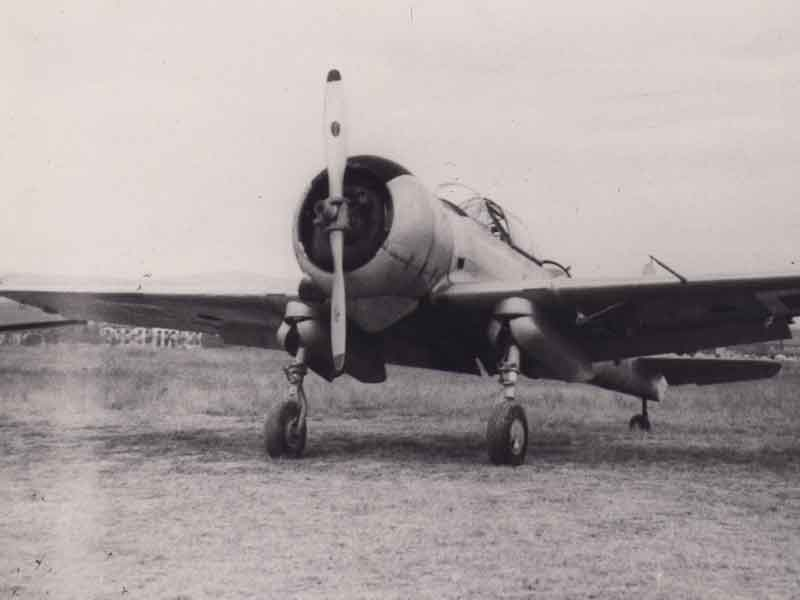
A Turkish Curtiss Falcon CW 22 aircraft, circa 1940s

The Turkish Air Force had 131 first line aircraft in 1937, of which only half were relatively modern. Turkey hoped to increase the size of its fleet to 300 by 1938. Although Turkey had 300 trained pilots, the majority of them would be rated with moderate ability to fly in bad weather in a Western European Air Force. In 1942, Ernest Phillips in his work Hitler's last Hope: A factual survey of the Middle East warzone and Turkey's vital strategic position admitted: "If the Germans were to stage an all out offensive in this area, they could bring more planes into the air than the Turks could even gather, and if we were to send too many from Libya to help Turkey, the weakness there would be such that we should be in difficulties on the other side of the Suez." At the beginning of World War II the Turkish Air Force consisted of some 370 aircraft of all types, 450 pilots and 8,000 men. During the war Turkey sent pilots to Great Britain for training purposes. 14 are known to have died in Great Britain. One of them was shot down by a German plane during a training flight in British air space, the rest died in accidents. The daughter of former Air Forces Commander Emin Alpkaya, who had been sent to Britain for training during the war, stated she found something amazing while examining her father's wartime diaries. He wrote that "they have told me that I am ready to go to Berlin. I have returned from the bombardment at 6 in the morning. I was tired". There were some allegations that Turkish pilots, who had been in Britain to get training during World War II, joined missions which bombed Berlin. However officials of the Turkish General Staff asserted that their pilots were never assigned in active aerial warfare and bombing flights. Alpkaya may have been referring to a ride along in a plane manned by an allied crew, in which he took on the role of observer, and not a combat role.

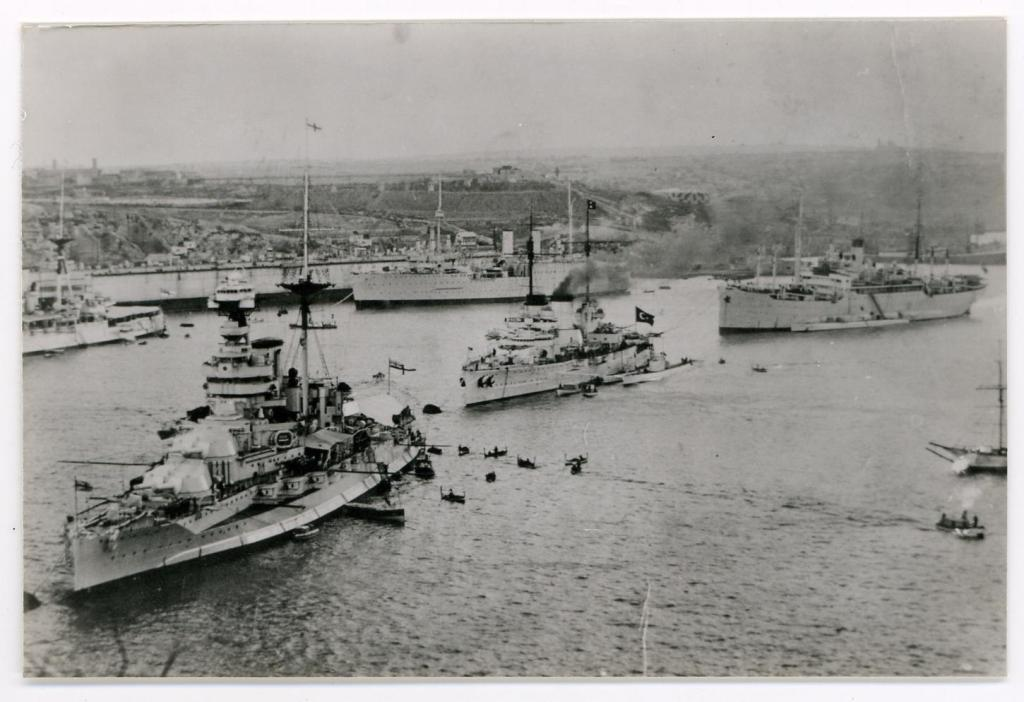
The Turkish fleet in Malta, November 1936.

The Turkish Navy was the weakest of the three armed services at the outbreak of war. It consisted of the outdated battle cruiser Yavuz (ex-Goeben), 4 destroyers, 5–6 submarines, 2 light cruisers, 3 mine-sweepers, 2 gunboats, 3 motor torpedo boats, 4 minelayers and a surveying vessel. The personnel strength was approximately 800 officers and 4,000 men. The Navy lacked all modern appliances for defending coasts and harbours, and the ships were defenceless against air attacks.

During the Anglo-Turkish Treaty negotiations in September 1939 a military credit agreement amounting to £25 million was agreed upon. A Turkish Ministry of Defence letter to the Turkish General Staff dating 22.03.1940 stated that the Turkish Army was to be increased to 1.3 million effectives, forming 14 army corps consisting of 41 infantry and 3 cavalry divisions, 7 fortified positions and one armoured brigade. Yet, the letter stated, "the material resources of the nation were unable to provide for the provisioning and transport of this large number of effectives".

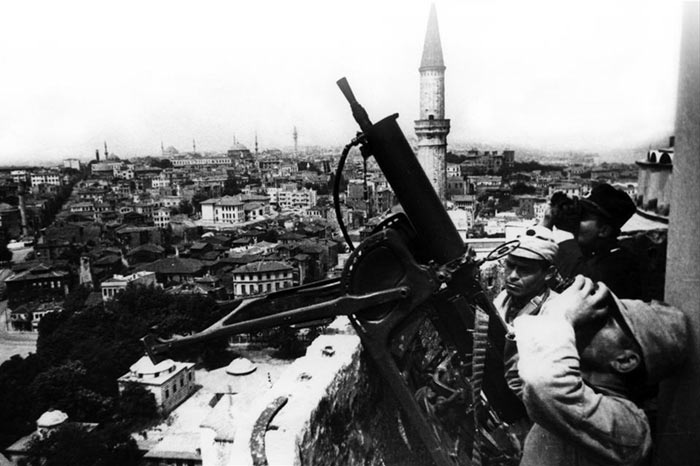
Turkish MG08 team on the minaret of the Hagia Sophia Museum, 1941.

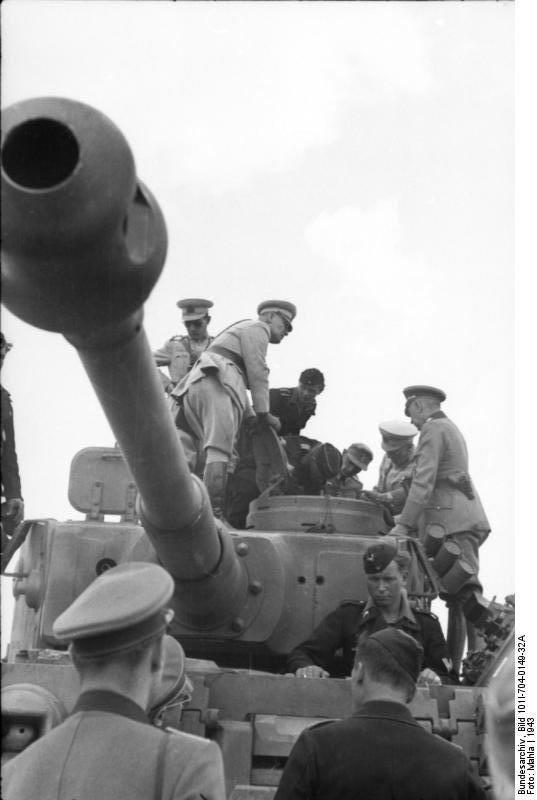
Cemil Cahit Toydemir examines the Tiger tank in 1943

World War II broke out in the first year of the İsmet İnönü presidency, and both the Allies and the Axis started to put pressure on İnönü to bring Turkey into the war on their respective sides. The Germans sent Franz von Papen to Ankara, while Winston Churchill secretly met with İnönü inside a train wagon near Adana on January 30, 1943. İnönü later met with Franklin D. Roosevelt and Winston Churchill at the Second Cairo Conference on December 4–6, 1943. Turkey remained neutral until the final stages of World War II and tried to maintain an equal distance between both the Axis and the Allies until February 1945, when Turkey entered the war on the side of the Allies against Germany and Japan.

Until 1941, both Roosevelt and Churchill thought that continued Turkish neutrality would serve the interests of the Allies by blocking the Axis from reaching the strategic oil reserves of the Middle East. But the early victories of the Axis up to the end of 1942 caused Roosevelt and Churchill to re-evaluate a possible Turkish participation in the war on the side of the Allies. Turkey had maintained a decently-sized Army and Air Force throughout the war, and Churchill wanted the Turks to open a new front in the Balkans. Roosevelt, on the other hand, still believed that a Turkish attack would be too risky. İnönü knew very well the hardships which his country had suffered during 11 years of incessant war between 1911 and 1922 and was determined to keep Turkey out of another war as long as he could. İnönü also wanted assurances on financial and military aid for Turkey, as well as a guarantee that the United States and the United Kingdom would stand beside Turkey in case of a Soviet invasion of the Turkish Straits after the war.

In 1942, Operation Gertrude, an invasion of Turkey, was planned by the Axis Powers, but did not materialize.

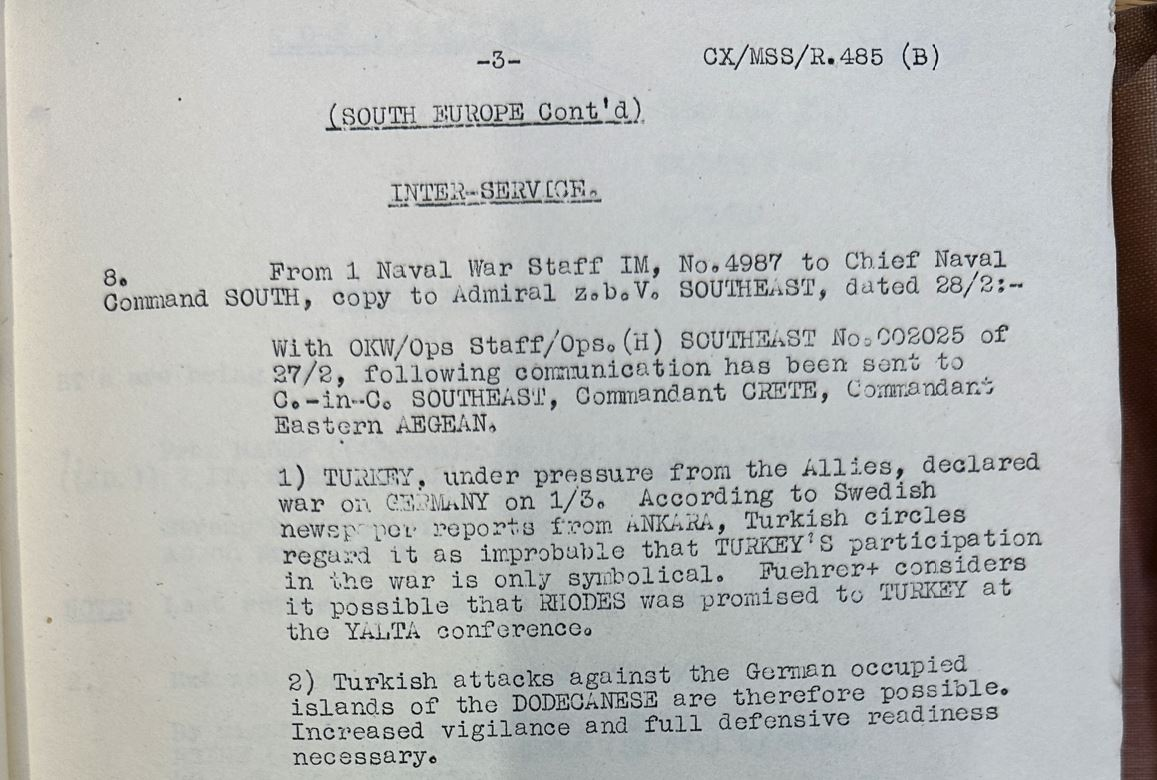
ULTRA message of Turkish declaration of War on Germany.

In April 1944, Turkey halted its sales of chromite to Germany, and broke off relations in August. Turkey declared war on the Axis powers in February 1945, after the Allies made its invitation to the inaugural meeting of the United Nations (along with the invitations of several other nations) conditional on full belligerency. No Turkish troops ever saw combat.

== Korean War ==
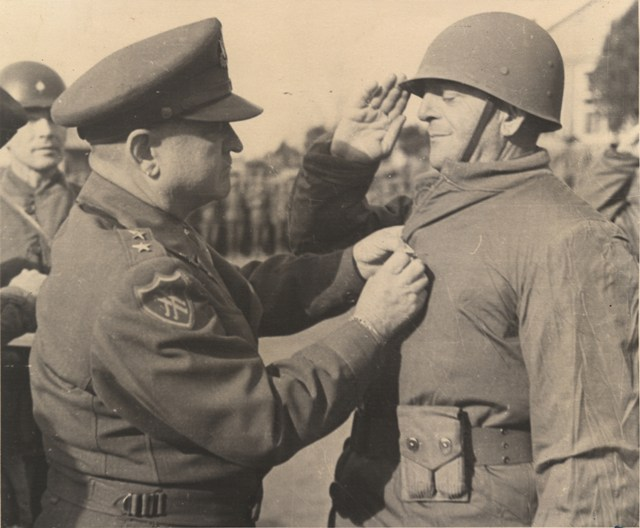
The commander of the Turkish Brigade, Tahsin Yazıcı receiving a Silver Star during the Korean War.

During the Cold War, Turkey participated in the Korean War as a member state of the United Nations, suffering 731 deaths in combat. The fear of a Soviet invasion and Stalin's unconcealed desire to control the Turkish Straits eventually led Turkey to give up its principle of neutrality in foreign relations and join NATO on February 18, 1952. Following NATO membership, Turkey initiated a comprehensive modernization program for its Armed Forces.

== Invasion of Cyprus ==
On 15 July 1974, the Greek military junta under Dimitrios Ioannides carried out a coup d'état in Cyprus, to unite the island with Greece. The coup ousted president Makarios III and replaced him with pro-enosis nationalist Nikos Sampson. In response to the coup, five days later the Turkish army invaded the island, citing a right to intervene to restore the constitutional order from the 1960 Treaty of Guarantee. This justification was rejected by the United Nations and the international community.

International pressure led to a ceasefire; by then 36% of the island had been taken over by the Turks and 180,000 Greek Cypriots had been evicted from their homes in the north. At the same time, around 50,000 Turkish Cypriots were displaced to the north and settled in the properties of the displaced Greek Cypriots. In mid-1975 among a variety of sanctions against Turkey, the US Congress imposed an arms embargo on Turkey for using US-supplied equipment during the invasion. There were 1,534 Greek Cypriots and 502 Turkish Cypriots missing as a result of the fighting from over ten years of conflict.

The occupation is viewed as illegal under international law and amounting to illegal occupation of EU territory since Cyprus became a member of the European Union.

== Recent ==
Towards the end of the 1980s, a restructuring and modernization process has been initiated by the Turkish Armed Forces, which still continues today. The final goal of Turkey is to produce indigenous military equipment and to become increasingly self-sufficient in terms of military technologies.

=== Kurdish–Turkish conflict ===
Iraq

=== First Libyan Civil War ===
Turkey's armed forces participated in the NATO-led military intervention and no-fly zone in Libya against Muammar Gaddafi's government troops.

The Turkish Navy participated with five ships and one submarine in the NATO-led naval blockade to enforce the arms embargo. It additionally provided six F-16 Fighting Falcon jets for aerial operations. On 24 March 2011, Turkey's parliament approved Turkish participation in military operations in Libya, including enforcing the NFZ in Libya. The airbases committed were Incirlik and İzmir.

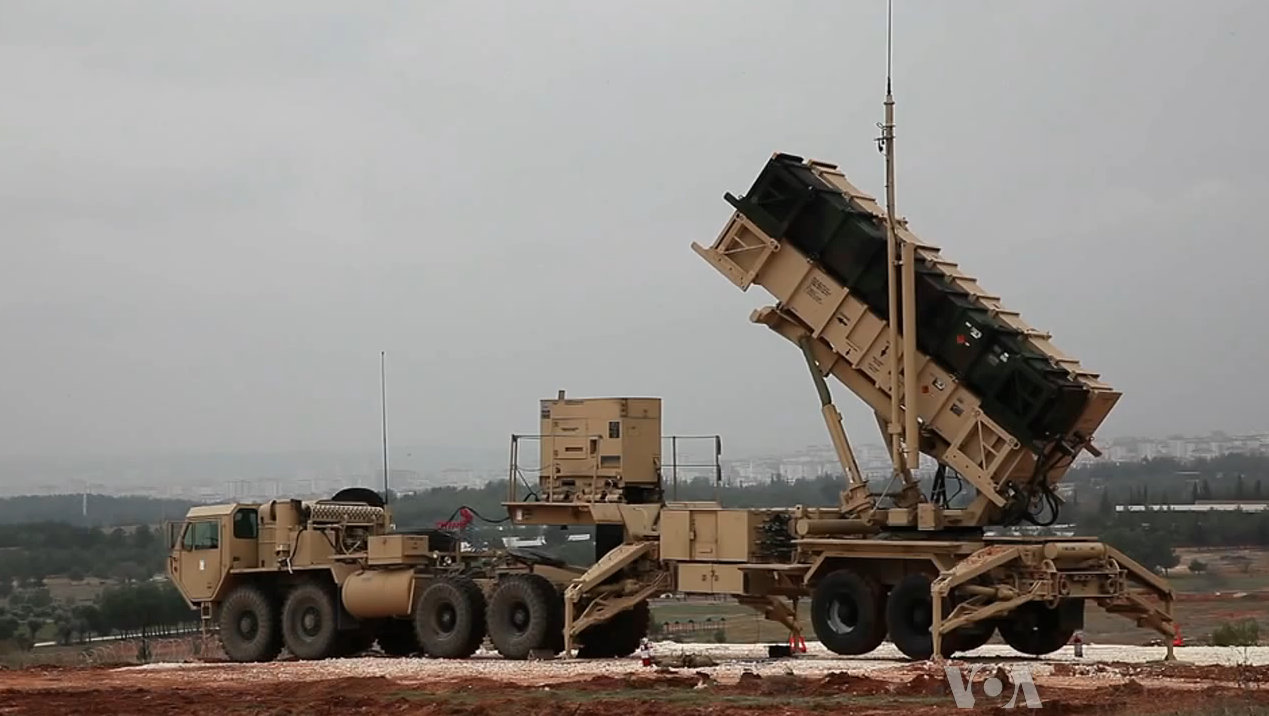
Six batteries of the NATO-backed, MIM-104 Patriot missile defense systems have been set up to protect Turkey against aerial incursions from war-torn Syria.

=== 2020 Nagorno-Karabakh war ===
Turkey provided significant support to Azerbaijan during its military operations against Armenia. This included military advising, the recruitment of Syrian mercenaries, and the transfer of military technology, including unmanned aerial vehicles.

== Overseas deployments ==
=== Current ===
- Forces in Cyprus
- Qatar
- KFOR
- UNIFL
- MINUSTAH
- UNAMID
- MONUSCO
- UNIIMOG

=== Past ===
- UNOSOM II
- IFOR
- SFOR
- UNMIS
- UNPROFOR
- UNIKOM
- ISAF

== See also ==
- Turkish Armed Forces
- Military of the Ottoman Empire
- Akinji
- Sipahi

== Sources ==
- Olson, Robert W (1989). The Emergence of Kurdish Racism and the Sheikh Said Rebellion, 1880–1925. Austin: University of Texas Press. ISBN 0-292-77619-5. Archived from the original on 2008-09-17.
- Olson, Robert (March 2000). "The Kurdish Rebellions of Sheikh Said (1925), Mt. Ararat (1930), and Dersim (1937–8): Their Impact on the Development of the Turkish Air Force and on Kurdish and Turkish Nationalism". Die Welt des Islams. 40 (1): 67–94. doi:10.1163/1570060001569893.
