= Battle of Wawon =

1950 battle of the Korean War

Coordinates: 39°43′N 126°3′E

- Part of Battle of the Ch'ongch'on River, Korean War
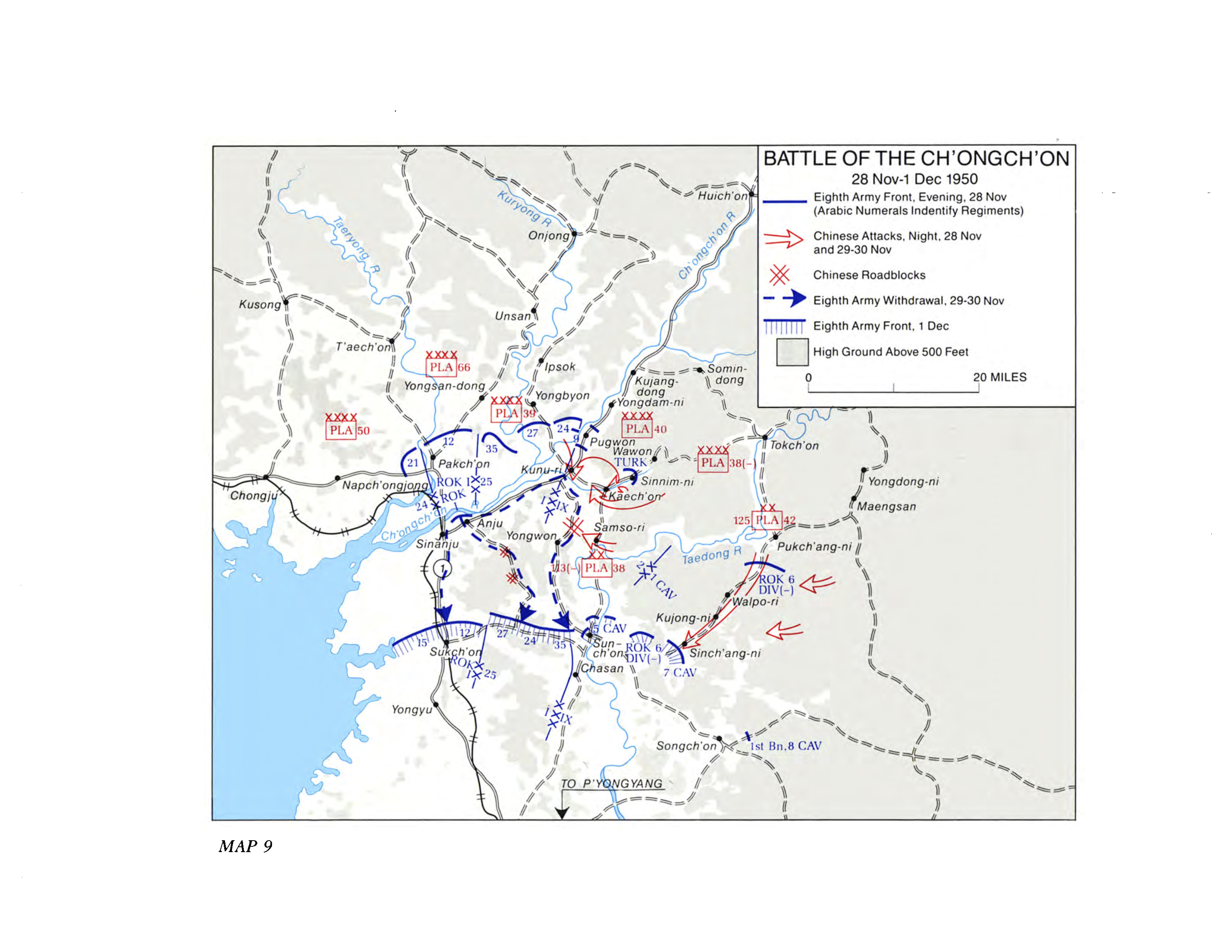
- Map of the Chinese counterattack, November 28 – December 1, 1950.
| Date | November 27–29, 1950 |
| Location | Wawon, east of Kunu-ri, North Korea |
| Result | Chinese victory; Turkish delay action |

Belligerents
| United Nations: Turkey; United States | China |

Commanders and leaders
| (Turkey) Tahsin Yazıcı (Turkey) Lütfi Bilgin † | (China) Zhai Zhongyu |

Units involved
| (Turkey) Turkish Brigade (United States) 2nd Infantry Division | (China) 114th Division |

Casualties and losses
| 218 killed 455 wounded 94 missing Chinese estimation: ~1,000 | 3,000~ killed and wounded |

The Battle of Wawon (Korean: 군우리 전투; Hanja: 軍隅里戰鬪; RR: Gunuri Jeontu; Turkish: Kunu-ri Muharebesi), also known as the Battle of Wayuan (Chinese: 瓦院战斗; pinyin: Wǎ Yuàn Zhàn Dòu), was a series of delay actions of the Korean War that took place from 27–29 November 1950 near Wawon in present-day North Korea. After the collapse of the US Eighth Army's right flank during the Battle of the Ch'ongch'on River, the Chinese People's Volunteer Army (PVA) 38th Corps (Note: In Chinese military nomenclature, the term "Army" (军) means Corps, while the term "Army Group" (集团军) means Army.) advanced rapidly towards the critical road junction at Kunu-ri in an effort to cut off United Nations forces' retreat route. In what was considered to be Turkey's first real combat action since the aftermath of World War I, the Turkish Brigade attempted to delay the Chinese advances at Wawon. Although during the battle the Turkish Brigade was crippled after being encircled by Chinese forces with superior numbers, they were still able to breach the Chinese trap and rejoin the US 2nd Infantry Division. Delay of the PVA advance after meeting with heavy Turkish resistance helped the other United Nations forces to withdraw without suffering many casualties and reassemble later in December.

== Background ==
After the destruction of the Korean People's Army (KPA) by mid-1950, China entered the Korean War by sending the PVA against the UN forces in Korea who were then very close to the Chinese border. In a series of surprise attacks, the PVA managed to cripple the US Eighth Army's right flank by decimating the Republic of Korea (ROK) II Corps, completely stalling the UN advances towards the Yalu River by 4 November 1950. Despite the seriousness of this setback, the undeterred General Douglas MacArthur ordered the Eighth Army to launch the Home-by-Christmas Offensive on November 24, 1950. As part of the offensive, the newly-arrived Turkish Brigade was assigned as the reserve of the US IX Corps, and was placed directly behind the center of the Eighth Army's advances.

Despite MacArthur's optimism, a massive PVA counterattack soon developed on the night of 25 November. Hoping to repeat their earlier successes against the Eighth Army, the Chinese again attacked the ROK II Corps and the UN right flank was routed by 26 November. Encouraged by this development, PVA commander Peng Dehuai instructed the PVA 38th Corps to advance westward from the UN right flank and cut off the US IX Corps at the road junction of Kunu-ri. As a counter, the Turkish Brigade was ordered by IX Corps to advance east from Kunu-ri on the afternoon of November 26.

Because the Turkish soldiers understood neither English nor Korean, the deployment of the Turkish Brigade quickly ran into difficulties, and the lack of accurate intelligence on PVA forces further added to the chaos. During their advance eastward, the Turks were forced to conduct long marches in the Korean countryside because of misunderstanding of the IX Corps' instructions. On 26 November 1950, a column 200 South Korean soldiers of the ROK 6th and 7th Infantry Divisions fleeing from Tokchon were attacked by a battalion of Turks who were the first to arrive at Wawon, after the Turks mistook the Koreans for Chinese. 20 South Koreans were killed and four others were injured by the Turks. The Turks suffered 14 deaths and six injuries as a result of an exchange of fire with the South Koreans. Because of false intelligence, the Turks were expecting to encounter with Chinese somewhere on the road. The event was incorrectly reported by American and European media as a Turkish victory over the Chinese and even after news leaked out about the truth to the Americans, no efforts were made by the media to fix the story. On the night of 27 November, the exhausted Turkish Brigade entered the village of Wawon to the east of Kunu-ri, and Brigadier General (Note: Yazıcı had volunteered for a reduction in rank to Colonel to lead the Brigade.) Tahsin Yazıcı of the Turkish Brigade ordered a semicircular perimeter to be established towards the northeast.

== Battle ==
Members of the Turkish Brigade in action.

On the night of 27 November, the advancing PVA 114th Division of the 38th Corps—under the command of Zhai Zhongyu—ambushed and destroyed the Turkish Brigade's reconnaissance platoon, alerting the entire brigade in the process. Knowing that the Chinese attack was imminent, the advance battalion of the brigade quickly took up defensive positions on the road leading into Wawon. They were soon met by the PVA 342nd Regiment, 114th Division, and the Chinese concentrated their attacks in an effort to penetrate the Turkish defensive lines. Heavy fire from the Turks managed to drive back the Chinese advances, but the attacking PVA regiment continued to spread towards the left flank of the defenders. By dusk on 28 November, the entire advance battalion was engulfed by the Chinese; sword and bayonet fighting ensued, resulting in 400 Turkish casualties. Observing that Wawon was surrounded by hills occupied by the Chinese, Yazıcı ordered the Turkish Brigade to withdraw 5 kilometres (3.1 mi) westward to the village of Sinim-ri.

As the Turkish Brigade withdrew at night, the PVA 342nd Regiment followed closely behind. Upon arriving at Sinim-ri, the Chinese immediately cut off the brigade by launching surprise attacks on the rear artillery units and the 3rd Battalion. At the same time, communication was lost between the Turkish headquarters and its battalions, leaving the rest of the brigade isolated from the outside world. Undaunted by the difficulties, the trapped Turks fought back stubbornly until their ammunition supply had run out. The fierce fighting forced the Chinese to call in the 340th Regiment to reinforce the 342nd. Despite the hard fighting, the Turks were close to being overrun by the morning of 29 November and only a timely air strike allowed the Turks to escape encirclement. In the aftermath of the fighting, the Turkish Brigade was completely fragmented, with most of their equipment and vehicles lost. With the US 2nd Infantry Division entering Kunu-ri on the night of November 28, the remnants of the Turkish Brigade fell back towards Kunu-ri and joined up with the US 38th Infantry Regiment of the 2nd Infantry Division.

Although the US IX Corps managed to safely pull back into Kunu-ri, the Turkish Brigade's ordeal was not over. On 29 November, the Turks that had been expelled from Sinim-ri were retreating in complete disarray, with the 38th Infantry finding Turkish survivors of the ambush struggling into Kunu-ri. By the afternoon of 29 November, the PVA 114th Division linked up with the 112th Division of the 38th Corps and renewed their attacks against the Turkish Brigade and the US 38th Regiment, with the 114th Division attacking the Turkish Brigade on the right flank of the 38th Infantry Regiment along the Kaechon River. The Chinese outflanked the Turks by attacking along the southern bank of the Kaechon River, then crossed the river at the UN rear areas. Upon noticing this development, Tahsin Yazıcı ordered a withdrawal, leaving the right flank of the 38th Infantry Regiment completely uncovered. The Turkish defeat at Pongmyong-ni resulted in havoc since the retreat of the Turks exposed the right flank of the 38th Infantry, and the disarrayed mass of retreating Turks stopped the 1st Battalion from taking their place at the 38th infantry's flank after Colonel George B. Peploe commanded them to cover the exposed flank. At the same time, the PVA 113th Division of the 38th Corps had cut off Kunu-ri from the south, completely surrounding the US 2nd Division and the Turkish Brigade at Kunu-ri. In the ensuing battles and withdrawals with the US 2nd Division, the Turkish Brigade was effectively destroyed as a fighting unit with 20 percent of its men becoming casualties.

== Controversy ==
Both historian Clay Blair and Colonel Paul Freeman believed that the Turkish Brigade was "overrated, poorly led green troops" who "broke and bugged out", and blamed them for not protecting on the right flank of the US Eighth Army. However historian Bevin Alexander noted that given the Turkish Brigade was the only UN force present between Wawon and Kunu-ri, the Chinese inability to capture Kunu-ri before the US 2nd Infantry Division meant the Turks had fulfilled their original mission and covered the withdrawal of the US IX Corps.

Brigadier General Tahsin Yazıcı has reported that he was not informed by the US commanders about the retreat of the US Army and during their retreat the US tank commanders supporting his unit had refused to attack the enemy on several occasions. Therefore his troops had to carry out bayonet charges to break out of encirclement, which caused hundreds of casualties. In his memoirs, Yazıcı also states that the only US unit he was grateful for was the combat medic unit of the US Army .

== Aftermath ==
Despite the heavy losses, the sacrifice of the Turkish Brigade was not forgotten by the US Eighth Army. On 13 December 1950, General Walton Walker, commander of the US Eighth Army, presented 15 Silver Star and Bronze Star medals to the Turkish Brigade for their gallantry in action against the Chinese, and this occasion was proudly remembered by the Turkish soldiers in Korea.

General Mac Arthur: “I am glad to see you. In Japan, everyone calls you Turks heroes. The Turks who saved the 8th Army in Kunuri and defeated the enemy in KUMYANGJ-NI are the heroes of heroes; he said of the Turkish Brigade, “There is no such thing as none.”

== Movies and documentaries ==
- Ayla: The Daughter of War

== See also ==
- Military history of China
- Military history of Turkey
- Military history of the United States

== Notes ==
Footnotes

Citations
