= Armed Forces of China =

The Armed Forces of China may refer to:

- Armed Forces of the People's Republic of China (disambiguation)
- Republic of China Armed Forces, the armed forces of Taiwan
  - National Revolutionary Army, from 1924 until 1947
