= Welborn G. Dolvin =

United States Army general

Welborn Griffin Dolvin Sr.
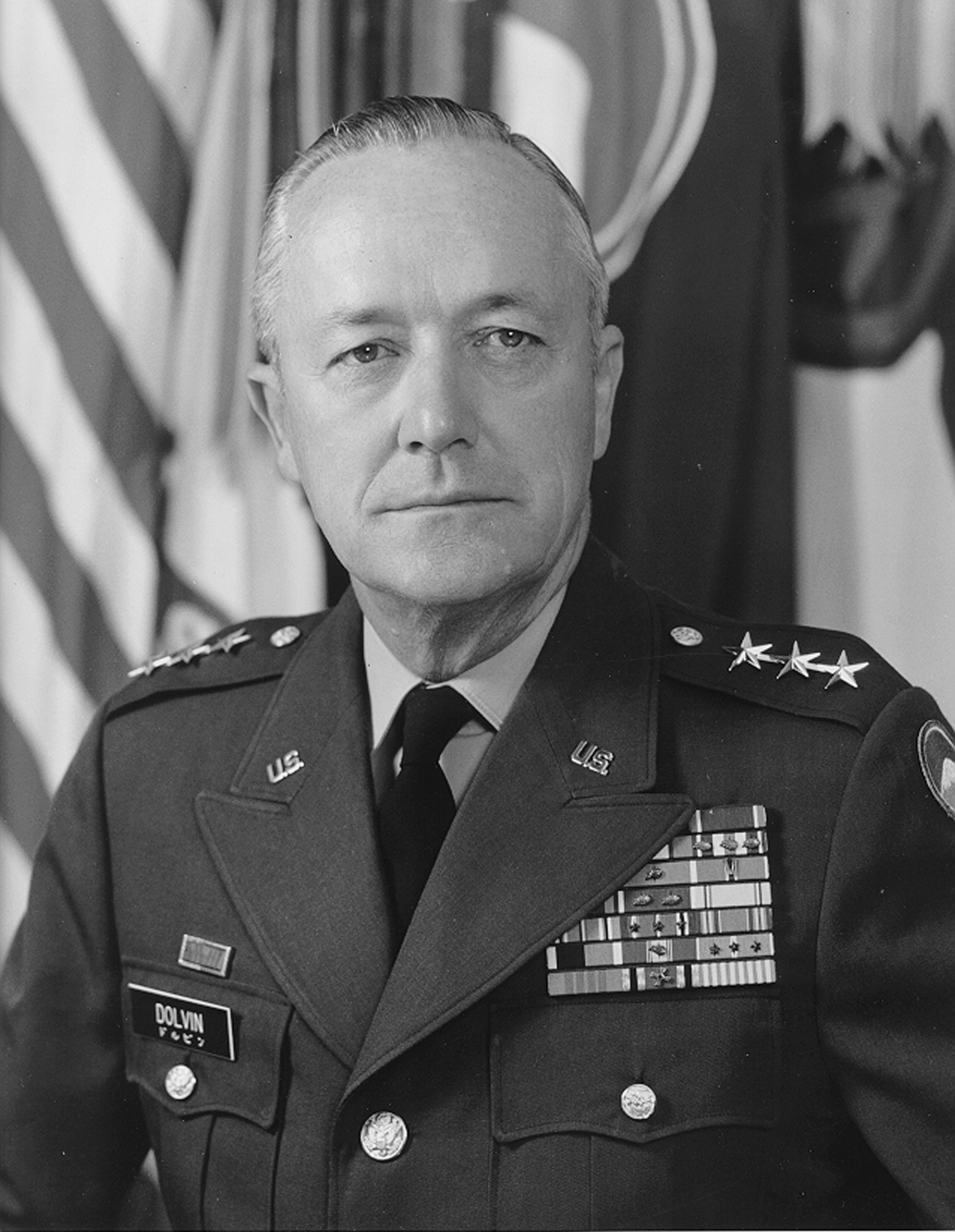
- LTG. Welborn G. Dolvin
- Born: February 8, 1916; Siloam, Georgia, US
- Died: May 17, 1991 (aged 75); Stevensville, Virginia, US
- Burial place: Arlington National Cemetery
- Relatives: Withers A. Burress (father-in-law)
- Military career
- Allegiance: United States of America
- Branch: United States Army
- Service years: 1939–1975
- Rank: Lieutenant General
- Nickname: Tom
- Commands: Headquarters Company, 756th Tank Battalion; 191st Medium Tank Battalion; 8072nd Medium Tank Battalion; 89th Medium Tank Battalion; Combat Command A, 4th Armored Division; 3rd Armored Division; XXIV Corps; IX Corps
- Conflicts: World War II; Korean War; Vietnam War
- Awards: Distinguished Service Cross; Army Distinguished Service Medal (4); Silver Star (4); Legion of Merit (3); Bronze Star; Purple Heart (3); Air Medal; Department of Defense Distinguished Civilian Service Award
- Other work: DOD Representative to the Panama Canal Treaty Negotiations; CJCS Representative to the Mutual Balanced Force Reduction Negotiations

Welborn Griffin Dolvin Sr. (February 8, 1916 – May 17, 1991) was a lieutenant general in the United States Army. He was a veteran of World War II, the Korean War and the Vietnam War. He is the recipient of Distinguished Service Cross and four Silver Stars. He served as commander of the XXIV Corps from 1971 to 1972. Dolvin is one of the 50 most top decorated American veterans.

Dolvin was married to Cynthia Kent Burress, the daughter of Lieutenant General Withers A. Burress, in 1949. They had three children and four grandchildren.

Dolvin died on May 17, 1991, due to cardiac arrhythmia related to asthma. He was buried at Arlington National Cemetery.

== Promotions ==
No insignia	Cadet, United States Military Academy : July 1, 1935
	Second lieutenant : 1939
	First lieutenant : 1940
	Captain : 1942
	First lieutenant : 1942
	Major : 1942
	Lieutenant colonel : 1944
	Captain : 1948
	Major : 1951
	Colonel : 1951
	Brigadier general : 1961
	Major general : 1963
	Lieutenant general : 1971

== Awards and decorations ==
His decorations include:

Parachutist Badge
Distinguished Service Cross
Army Distinguished Service Medal with 3 bronze oak leaf clusters	Silver Star with 3 bronze oak leaf clusters	Legion of Merit with 2 bronze oak leaf clusters
Bronze Star with Valor device	Purple Heart with 2 bronze oak leaf clusters	Air Medal
Joint Service Commendation Medal	Army Commendation Medal	Department of Defense Distinguished Civilian Service Award
American Defense Service Medal	American Campaign Medal	European-African-Middle Eastern Campaign Medal with 4 bronze campaign stars
World War II Victory Medal	Army of Occupation Medal with 'Germany' clasp	National Defense Service Medal with 1 bronze service star
Korean Service Medal with 3 bronze campaign stars	Vietnam Service Medal with 3 bronze campaign stars	French Croix de Guerre
Order of Merit of the Federal Republic of Germany (Member)	Order of National Security Merit; Cheon-Su Medal (Korea)	National Order of Vietnam (Knight)
United Nations Korea Medal	Vietnam Campaign Medal	Republic of Korea War Service Medal

Army Presidential Unit Citation
Army Meritorious Unit Commendation	Republic of Korea Presidential Unit Citation	Republic of Vietnam Gallantry Cross Unit Citation
