= Armed forces of the People's Republic of China =

Armed forces of the People's Republic of China may refer to its three constituents:

- People's Liberation Army, the military wing of the Chinese Communist Party and the regular armed forces of the People's Republic of China
- People's Armed Police, the gendarmerie organization in the People's Republic of China
  - China Coast Guard
- Militia (China), the reserve forces of the People's Republic of China

== See also ==
- Armed Forces of China (disambiguation)
