= Kunu-dong =

- Map of North Korea showing the location of Kunu-dong
- Coordinates: 39.738°N 125.86°E
- Country: North Korea
- Province: South Pyongan

Korean name
- Hangul: 군우동
- Hanja: 軍隅洞
- RR: Gunu-dong
- MR: Kunu-dong

Kunu-dong (Kunuri) is a village located in South Pyongan Province, North Korea. A key battle of the Korean War, the Battle of Kunu-ri, took place near there in November 1950. Kunu-ri was mainly a communication center and a railroad station at the time, and it contains the lateral east-west road which runs from Sinanju on the west coast and Hungnamon the east coast. It is located at the eastern bank of the Chongchon River which parallels the Kunu-ri—Huichon road, and it is also situated at the northern end of the Taedong River valley and on the western slopes of the northern Taebaek Mountains range, generally known as the "Spine of Korea". Kunu-ri is one of the most northern point UN forces managed to reach during the Korean War, which is very near the Chinese border before the massive Chinese attack drove them all the way south. The village was near the location where the US Army 2nd Engineer Battalion burned its colors to prevent their capture by Chinese forces.

Kunu-ri is currently absorbed by the city of Kaechon.

== See also ==
- Battle of Wawon
