= Tahsin Yazıcı =

Ottoman Army officer, Turkish Army general and politician (1892–1971)

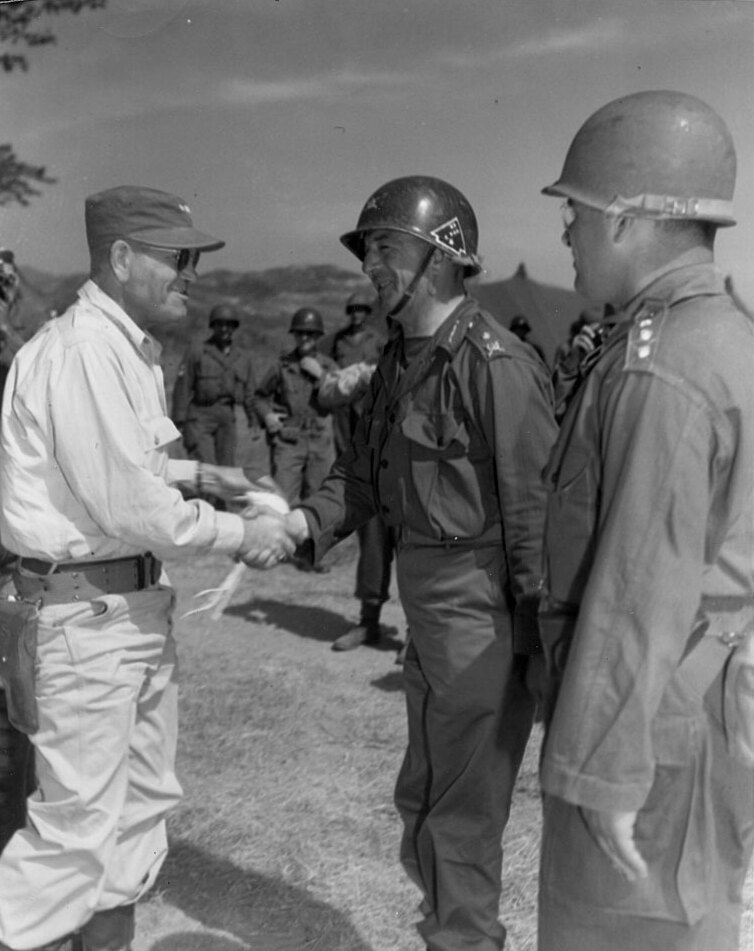
- Brigadier Tahsin Yazıcı, commander of the Turkish Brigade (center) greets Lieutenant General Frank W. Milburn, commander of US I Corps, upon his arrival at Brigade Headquarters, Korea, to attend a Turkish celebration on July 6, 1951.
- Born: 1892; Monastir, Ottoman Empire (now Bitola, North Macedonia)
- Died: February 11, 1971; Ankara, Turkey
- Military career
- Allegiance: Ottoman Empire; Turkey
- Branch: (Ottoman Empire) Ottoman Army; Turkish Land Forces
- Service years: 1912–1952
- Rank: Major general
- Commands: Turkish Brigade (Korea)
- Conflicts: World War I; Turkish War of Independence; Korean War
- Awards: Silver Star
- Other work: Member of the GNAT (Istanbul)

Tahsin Yazıcı (Turkish: ['tah.sin jɑ.zɯ.d͡ʒɯ]) (1892 in Monastir – February 11, 1971 in Ankara) was an Ottoman Army officer and later a Turkish Army general and politician.

== Biography ==
He was born to his father Ali Bey and his mother Ganimet Hanım in Monastir, Ottoman Empire (present-day Bitola, North Macedonia) in 1892. He was recorded in Kefçedede wards, Üsküdar, Istanbul. He entered the Ottoman Military Academy in Istanbul, Turkey on November 1, 1909, and graduated from the academy as second lieutenant on March 1, 1912. After graduation, he served during the First World War in Gallipoli and he was promoted to the rank of lieutenant on March 1, 1916. He then served during the Turkish War of Independence and was promoted to the rank of captain on October 10, 1920. In 1925, he participated in quelling the Sheikh Said rebellion. He married Nezahat Hanım (1904–1996) in 1929. They had a son, Ahmet Bali (1931–). He was then sent to France to learn cavalry warfare. After returning to Turkey, he was appointed to the teaching staff of the Cavalry School. Tahsin Yazıcı was promoted to the rank of major on August 30, 1931. In 1935, he was assigned as commander of the tank battalion that was the first tank unit of Turkey. In 1937, he returned to the Cavalry School and was promoted to the rank of lieutenant colonel on August 30, 1938, and then colonel on August 30, 1943. As a Colonel between 1943 and 1946, he served as the aide-de-camp to the Chief of General Staff Cemil Cahit Toydemir.

He commanded the Turkish Brigade during the Korean War. His brigade saved Americans in Battle of Kunuri. Though it was initially placed as a reserve for the U.S. 8th Army, the collapse of the front in the face of massive Chinese attacks on 26 November 1950 meant that it soon found itself in the thick of battle.

Having retired from the Army in 1952, he served as a member of parliament in the ruling Democratic Party from 1954. In 1956, he was appointed Turkey's Ambassador to Israel until 1959. After the 1960 Turkish coup d'état, his party was suppressed and he was sentenced to five years in prison at the Yassıada trials. He served three years in prison before being released.

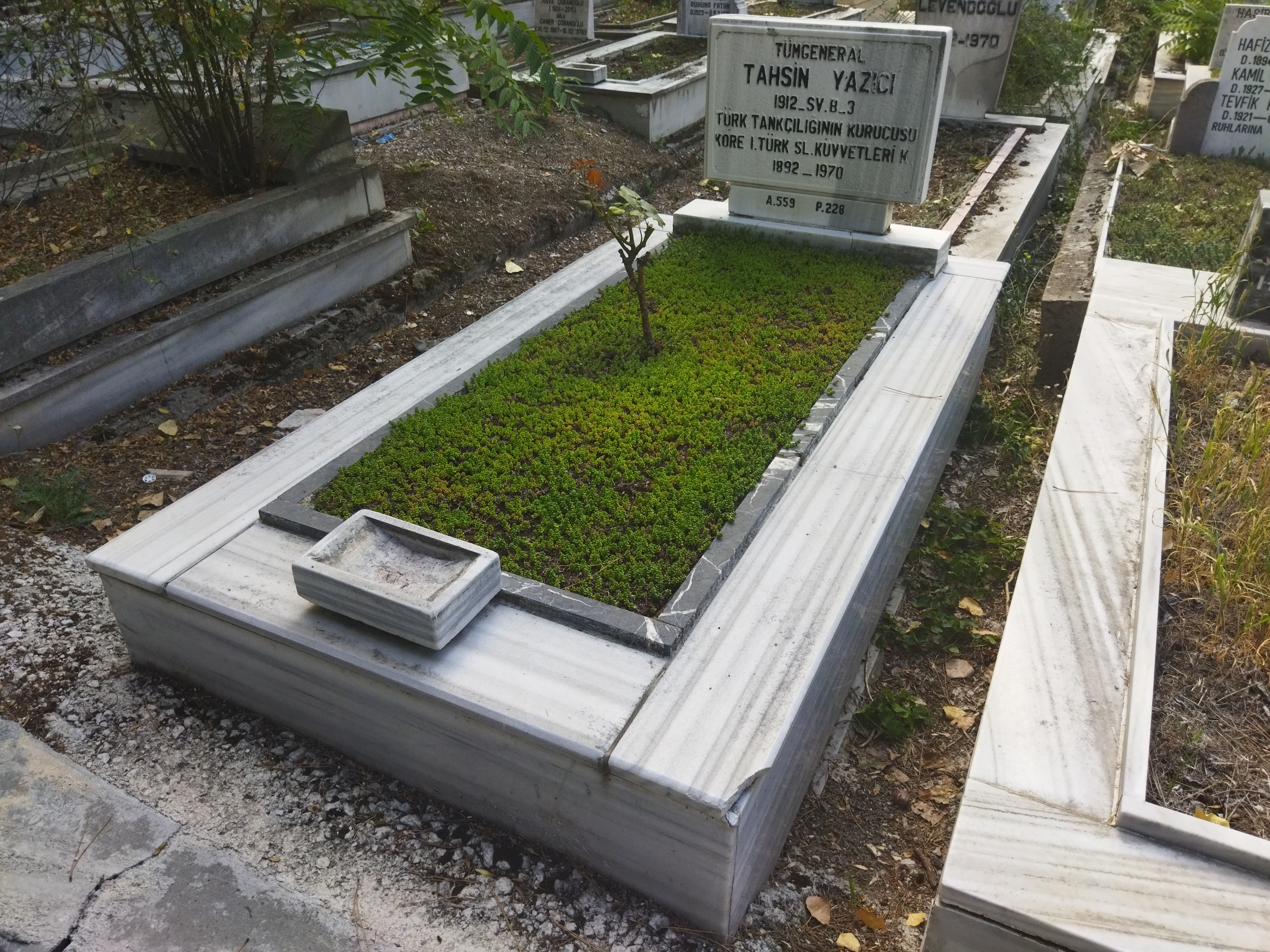
Grave of Tahsin Yazıcı

He died in 1971 and was buried in Cebeci Asri Cemetery.
