= Military history of China =

The recorded military history of China extends from about 2200 BC to the present day. This history can be divided into the military history of China before 1912, when a revolution overthrew the imperial state, and the period of the Republic of China Army and the People's Liberation Army.

== Pre-modern period ==
Although the traditional Chinese Confucian philosophy favored peaceful political solutions and showed contempt for brute military force, the military was influential in most Chinese states. The Chinese pioneered the use of crossbows, advanced metallurgical standardization for arms and armor, early gunpowder weapons such as the Cannon and Fire Lance, and other advanced weapons, but also adopted nomadic cavalry and Western military technology later on. In addition, China's armies also benefited from an advanced logistics system as well as a rich strategic tradition, beginning with Sun Tzu's The Art of War, that deeply influenced military thought.

== Modern period ==
=== Warlord era ===
The Warlord Era was the period in the history of the Republic of China between 1916 and 1928, when control of the country was divided between rival military cliques of the Beiyang Army and other regional factions. It began after the death of Yuan Shikai, the President of China after the Xinhai Revolution. He took power by leveraging his position as Prime Minister of the Qing Dynasty to force the Emperor’s abdication in exchange for the presidency. He quickly abandoned his promises of reform, working to dismantle the parliament and consolidate military power. As a result, following Yuan's death on 6 June 1916, a power vacuum occurred which was quickly filled by military strongmen, leading to widespread violence, chaos, and oppression. The Nationalist Kuomintang (KMT) government of Sun Yat-sen, based in Guangzhou, began contesting Yuan's Beiyang government based in Beijing for recognition as the legitimate government of China.

The most powerful cliques were the Zhili clique led by Feng Guozhang, who controlled several northern provinces; the Anhui clique led by Duan Qirui, based in several southeastern provinces; and the Fengtian clique led by Zhang Zuolin, based in Manchuria. The three cliques often engaged in conflict for territory and hegemony. In mid-1917, after Yuan's successor Li Yuanhong attempted to remove Duan as premier, the general Zhang Xun forced Li to resign and made a brief attempt to restore the Qing dynasty, which was quashed by Duan's troops. Feng became the acting president, but was forced to step down by Duan in late 1918 and was replaced by Xu Shichang. In mid-1920, the new Zhili clique leaders, Cao Kun and Wu Peifu, defeated Duan in the Zhili–Anhui War in an alliance with Zhang Zuolin. A power struggle broke out between Cao and Zhang, ending in Cao's victory in the First Zhili–Fengtian War in 1922. Li was briefly restored to an impotent presidency before being deposed by and in favour of Cao until 1924, when during the Second Zhili–Fengtian War, the latter was betrayed by his subordinate Feng Yuxiang, who joined with Zhang to stage a coup against Cao. Feng and Zhang shared power and recalled Duan to serve as president before they clashed in the Anti-Fengtian War that resulted in Zhang's victory. Duan was deposed and, after a series of short-lived cabinets, Zhang declared himself Generalissimo in 1927.

The warlords of southern China, who had cooperated against Yuan's dictatorship and Duan's attempt to extend Beiyang control to the south, were divided between Sichuan, Yunnan, Hunan, and Guangxi cliques, among others. In 1917, Sun Yat-sen created the Constitutional Protection Junta in Guangzhou to oppose the Beiyang warlords, but the southern warlords rivaled him for control, leading Sun to abandon it in 1918. In 1920, Chen Jiongming invaded Guangdong in the Guangdong–Guangxi War and gained control, after which Sun returned to Guangzhou. In 1922, Chen and Sun broke over political disagreements, after which the Yunnan and Guangxi warlords helped Sun regain power in 1923. To resolve the problem of being dependent on warlords, Sun accepted Soviet assistance in building a party and military infrastructure of his own, creating the Whampoa Military Academy and the National Revolutionary Army (NRA). After Sun died in 1925, the head of the Whampoa Academy, Chiang Kai-shek, emerged as leader of the NRA and KMT. In 1926, he launched the Northern Expedition, which destroyed the Zhili and Anhui forces. Zhang Zuolin was assassinated by the Japanese in 1928, and on 29 December, his son Zhang Xueliang accepted the leadership of Chiang's Nationalist government, thus reunifying China and beginning the Nanjing decade.

Despite most accounts of the era concluding it with the Northern Expedition of 1928, several warlords retained their influence during the 1930s and 1940s, resulting in events such as the Central Plains War of 1929–1930, in which the former warlords Feng Yuxiang, Yan Xishan of Shanxi, and Li Zongren of Guangxi rebelled against Chiang. Regional control by former warlords was problematic for the Nanjing government during the Second Sino-Japanese War and Chinese Civil War, and contributed to the Communists' final victory in 1949. Other major warlords included the Ma clique in Gansu, Ningxia, and Qinghai; Liu Xiang and Liu Wenhui in Sichuan; Long Yun in Yunnan; Zhang Jingyao in Hunan; Zhang Zongchang and Han Fuju in Shandong; and Sheng Shicai in Xinjiang.

=== Republic of China Army ===
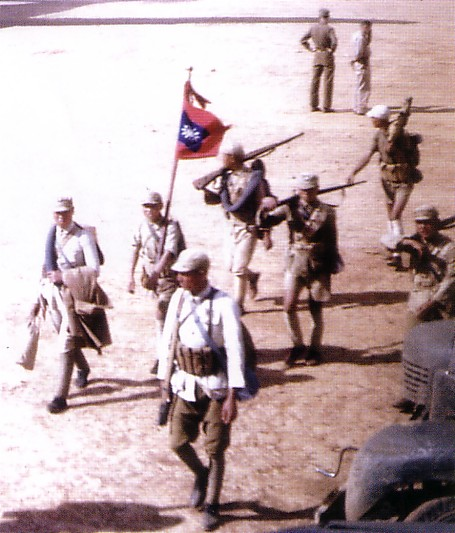
The National Revolutionary Army during World War II

The Republic of China Army was founded as the National Revolutionary Army, the armed wing of Sun Yat-sen's Kuomintang (KMT) in 1924. It participated in the Northern Expedition, the Second Sino-Japanese War (during World War II) and the Chinese Civil War before withdrawing with the ROC government to Taiwan in 1949. After 1949, the ROC Army has participated in combat operations on Kinmen and the Dachen Archipelago against the PLA in the Battle of Kuningtou, and in the First and Second Taiwan Strait Crisis. In addition to these major conflicts, ROCA commandos were regularly sent to raid the Fujian and Guangdong coasts. Until the 1970s, the stated mission of the Army was to retake the mainland from the People's Republic of China. Following the lifting of martial law in 1988 and democratization of the 1990s, the mission of the ROC Army has been shifted to the defense of Taiwan (Formosa), Penghu (the Pescadores Islands), Kinmen and Matsu from a PLA invasion.

With the reduction of the size of the ROC armed forces in recent years, the Army has endured the largest number of cutbacks as ROC military doctrine has begun to emphasize the importance of offshore engagement with the Navy and Air Force. After this shift in emphasis, the ROC Navy and Air Force have taken precedence over the ROC Army in defense doctrine and weapons procurement. Recent short-term goals in the Army include acquisition and development of joint command and control systems, advanced attack helicopters and armored vehicles, multiple launch rocket systems and field air defense systems. The Army is also in the process of transitioning to an all volunteer force.

=== People's Liberation Army ===
Chinese military history underwent a dramatic transformation in the 20th century, with the People's Liberation Army beginning in 1927 with the start of the Chinese Civil War, and developing from a peasant guerrilla force into what remains the largest armed force in the world.

== See also ==
- List of Chinese wars and battles
