= Raoul Magrin-Vernerey =

French general (1892–1964)

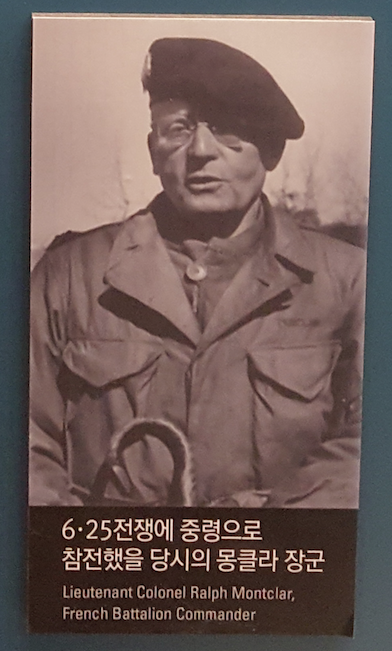
- Ralph Monclar during the Korean War
- Born: Raoul Charles Magrin-Vernerey; 7 February 1892; Budapest, Austria-Hungary
- Died: 3 June 1964 (aged 72); Paris, France
- Military career
- Allegiance: France; Free France
- Branch: French Army
- Service years: 1912 – 1964 (52 years of service, more than half-century)
- Rank: Général de corps d'armée
- Nickname: Ralph Monclar
- Units: 60th Line Infantry Regiment; 16th Chasseur Battalion à Pied; 1st Foreign Infantry Regiment; 1^{e} REI; 3rd Foreign Infantry Regiment; 3^{e} REI; 2nd Foreign Infantry Regiment; 2^{e} REI; 5th Foreign Infantry Regiment; 5^{e} REI; 4th Foreign Infantry Regiment; 4^{e} REI
- Commands: 13th Foreign Legion Demi-Brigade; 13^{e} DBLE; 1st Free French Division; 1^{re} DFL: 2nd Inspector of the Foreign Legion (1948–1950) French Korean Battalion
- Conflicts: World War I Levant – Morocco – Algeria – Tonkin; World War II: Battles of Narvik; Korean War
- Awards: Grand Cross of the Légion d'honneur Companion of the Liberation; Médaille militaire Croix de guerre 1914–1918; Croix de guerre 1939–1945; Honorary Knight Commander of the Order of the British Empire (UK); Silver Star (US); Taegeuk Order of Military Merit (ROK)
- Other work: Governor of Les Invalides (1962–1964)

Raoul Charles Magrin-Vernerey (French pronunciation: [ʁaul ʃaʁl maɡʁɛ̃ vɛʁnəʁɛ]; 7 February 1892 – 3 June 1964), also known as Ralph Monclar ([ʁalf mɔ̃klaʁ]), was a French general and 2nd Inspector of the Foreign Legion who fought in World War I, World War II within the ranks of the Free French Forces and led the French Battalion in the Korean War. He was also one of the first senior officers to respond to Charles de Gaulle's Appeal of 18 June from London.

== Early life ==
Following studies at Victor Hugo School, he first tried to volunteer for the Foreign Legion. Because he was only 15, he was not admitted and so returned to continue his studies.

== Military career ==
=== World War I ===
Admitted to École spéciale militaire de Saint-Cyr in 1912, he graduated in 1914 part of the "promotion de Montmirail" with the rank of Sous-lieutenant. On 5 August 1914, he joined the 60th Line Infantry Regiment (French: 60^{e} régiment d'infanterie de ligne, 60^{e} RIL) and ended the war with the rank of captain. He was made a Chevalier of the Légion d'honneur and 11 citations, wounded 7 times and subsequently retired with 90% invalidity because of a thigh fractured by a bullet, a broken arm due to a grenade, trepanning wounds and gas burns to his eyes.

=== Interwar period ===
Following the Armistice of 11 November 1918, he was assigned to the Allied Chief Commander of the Orient. He then joined the general staff headquarters as chief of the first bureau in the beginning of 1919 and appointed to command the 1st Moroccan Tirailleur Regiment (French: 1^{er} Régiment de Tirailleurs Marocains, 1^{er} R.T.M). On 25 September, he was designated to conduct a training program at the Center of Aviation of the 415th Infantry Regiment 415^{e} RI of San Stefano where he was appointed as an aviation instructor. Following the assignment, he joined the administrative services of the Levant in Beirut, Lebanon as an adjoint to the administrator. He was designated as an Administrative Council on 1 March 1920 then Inspector on 19 October. In that post, he earned a citation at the order of the armed forces. On 11 May 1921, he was appointed to form the Army of the Levant in the Levant. On 1 July 1921, he assumed command of the 4th combat company of the 1st Squadron, eventually becoming the adjoint of the regimental commander.

On 1 March 1924, he finally joined the ranks of the French Foreign Legion. After a brief tour with the 1st Foreign Infantry Regiment 1^{er} REI, he was assigned to the 3rd Foreign Infantry Regiment, 3^{e} REI (the recently redesignated Marching Regiment of the Foreign Legion) and took part in the Moroccan campaign until 1927. Then, he was promoted to the rank of Chef de bataillon (Commandant – Major) in 1928.

On 14 October 1930, he was designated to take command of the 16th Chasseur Battalion à Pied (French: 16^{e} Bataillon de chasseurs à pied, 16^{e} B.C.P). Following the command, he was reassigned to the Legion in 1931 and would not leave the Legion until October 1941. During his 10-year tenure, he was assigned to the 2nd Foreign Infantry Regiment, 2^{e} REI, then stationed in Morocco and the 5th Foreign Infantry Regiment, 5^{e} REI in Tonkin.

=== World War II ===
Returning from the Far East, in January 1938 he assumed command of the instruction battalion at Saïda, while he was promoted to the rank of lieutenant-colonel on 25 June 1938, prior to embarking to Morocco with the 4th Foreign Infantry Regiment 4^{e} REI. On 23 February 1940, he rejoined the 3^{e} R.E.I, which formed a Mountain Marching Battalion Groupment. He was designated as a regimental commander of 2 Legion battalions which formed the 13th Light Mountain Demi-Brigade of the Legion (French: 13^{e} Demi-Brigade Légère de Montagne de Légion Etrangère, 13^{e} DB.L.MLE). Regrouped first in Larzac then Sathonay, his unit prepared for a campaign with destination unknown. This unit would be the forebear of the 13th Demi-Brigade of the Foreign Legion, 13^{e} DBLE.

On 13 May 1940, at Bjerkvik, Norway, the 13th DBLE saw action for the first time in the Norwegian Campaign, conquering four objectives and forcing German forces to retreat while abandoning numerous prisoners, automatic arms, equipment and 10 Junkers Ju 52 transport aircraft stuck on the ice of a lake.

From 28 May to 2 June, Magrin-Vernerey and his Legionnaires were victorious at Narvik, which was referred to as "the only French victory of 1939–1940" (la seule victoire française de 1939–1940). The 13th DBLE liberated 60 Allied prisoners and captured 400 Germans, 10 cannons and significant material.

Barely back to France with 500 of his men, he joined the Free French Forces in England on 21 June 1940 and adopted the name de Monclar (from the village name of Monclar-de-Quercy, Tarn-et-Garonne). He was soon promoted to the rank of colonel.

Leading the 13th DBLE in operations against Axis forces in the East African Campaign with the 1st Free French Division 1^{re} DFL, he took part in the Battle of Keren and the Battle of Massawa.

In June 1941, he refused to take part in combat against Vichy French forces in the Levant and particularly the Legionnaires of the 6th Foreign Infantry Regiment 6^{e} REI. Following his refusal, he was replaced as commander of the 13th DBLE by Lieutenant-colonel Prince Amilakvari, who led the unit across northern Libya and into Tunisia.

Promoted to the first section of officer generals, he exercised various commands in the Levant and participated to numerous campaigns and finished his tour as the Superior Commander of Troops in the Levant.

Becoming adjoint to the superior commander of troops in Algeria in 1946, he was in 1948 designated as 2nd Inspector of the Foreign Legion charged with the permanent mission of inspecting Legion units until 1950. Over the following two years, he constantly visited the various continents where the Legion was stationed and engaged in combat, including in Algeria, Morocco, Madagascar and Indochina.

=== Korean War ===
In 1950, at the age of 58 and on the eve of retirement from active duty, he volunteered to command the United Nations Bataillon de Corée in course of formation and was voluntarily demoted from général de corps d'armée to lieutenant-colonel in order to command the battalion. The battalion was attached to the 23rd Infantry Regiment as part of the US Army's 2nd Infantry Division.

In February 1951, the 23rd Infantry Regiment and the Bataillon de Corée fought the Battle of Chipyong-ni. According to the US Army commander in Korea, General Matthew Ridgway:

I shall speak briefly of the 23rd U.S. Infantry Regiment, Colonel Paul L. Freeman Jr. commanding, [and] with the French Battalion. Isolated far in advance of the general battle line, completely surrounded in near-zero weather, they repelled repeated assaults by day and night by vastly superior numbers of Chinese. They were finally relieved. I want to say that these American fighting men, with their French comrades-in-arms, measured up in every way to the battle conduct of the finest troops America and France have produced throughout their national existence.

== Later life ==
Attaining the limit of service age, he returned to France in 1951.

In 1962 while succeeding général André Kientz, he became Governor of Les Invalides (French: Gouverneur des Invalides), an official function directing the institution and an office in which he died while in tenure, like many other Governors.

He was also the founding President of the National Association of United Nations French Forces of the Korean Regiment.

== Honors ==
- The Garrison of the 13th Demi-Brigade of the Foreign Legion, 13^{e} DBLE in Djibouti bears his name.
- In 1979, the place du Général-Monclar in the 15^{e} arrondissement de Paris bears his name.
- The 171st promotion of the École spéciale militaire de Saint-Cyr (1984–1987) bears his name.
- Stade Monclar at Neuilly-sur-Seine.
- In 2011, the town hall Monclar-de-Quercy rendered him hommage by inaugurating a stele in his honour at the entrance of town hall. Also, the town hall salle d'honneur bear also his name.

== Decorations ==
=== French decorations ===
- Grand Cross of the Legion of Honour
- Companion of the Order of Liberation (1 June 1943)
- Military Medal
- Croix de guerre 1914–1918 (11 citations)
- Croix de guerre 1939–1945 (3 citations)
- Croix de guerre des théâtres d'opérations extérieures (6 citations)
- Resistance Medal with rosette
- Escapees' Medal
- Insignia for the Military Wounded (7 stars)
- Volunteer combatant's cross 1914–1918
- Colonial Medal with clasps "Maroc 25–26" and "Erythrée"
- Syria-Cilicia commemorative medal
- Commemorative war medal 1914–1918
- 1914–1918 Inter-Allied Victory medal
- 1939–1945 Commemorative war medal
- Commemorative medal for voluntary service in Free France
- French Commemorative Medal of operations of the United Nations in Korea
- Commemorative Medal of Lebanon (1926)

=== Foreign decorations ===
- Grand Officer of the Order of the Dragon of Annam (Annam)
- Commander of the Order of the Crown (Belgium)
- Croix de Guerre (Belgium)
- Knight Grand Cross of the Royal Order of Cambodia (Cambodia)
- Order of the Star of Anjouan (Comoros)
- Military Merit Targuk with silver star (South Korea)
- Silver Star (US)
- Legion of Merit (US)
- Croix de guerre (Greece)
- Order of Merit (Lebanon)
- Grand Officer of the Order of Ouissam Alaouite (Morocco)
- Grand Cross of the Royal Norwegian Order of St. Olav (Norway)
- War Cross with sword with sword (Norway)
- Virtuti Militari (Poland)
- Officer of the Order of the Star of Romania with swords (Romania)
- Knight Commander of the Order of the British Empire (UK)
- Military Cross (UK)
