= Battle of the Twin Tunnels =

1951 Korean War conflict

Coordinates: 37.443°N 127.672°E

- Part of the Korean War
Date	1 February 1951
Location	Near Chip'yŏng ri, Jije-myeon, Yangp'yŏng County, South Korea
Result	UN victory

Belligerents
United Nations; United States; France	China

Commanders and leaders
Paul Freeman (French Fourth Republic) Ralph Monclar	(China) Peng Dehuai

Units involved
X Corps; 23rd Infantry Regiment; 347th Field Artillery Battalion; (French Fourth Republic) French Battalion	(China) 42nd Army; 125th Division

Strength
3,000	10,000

Casualties and losses
(French Fourth Republic) ：32 killed and 100 wounded ：13 killed	1,300 killed (counted); 3,600 killed (estimated)

The Battle of the Twin Tunnels (French: Bataille de Twin-Tunnels) took place during the Korean War. In which the UN forces inflicted heavy casualties on the People's Volunteer Army (PVA). The "Twin Tunnels" refer to a series of railroad tunnels along the Central Line in eastern Jije-myeon, Yangpyeong County, Gyeonggi Province, South Korea.

A series of battles, including Twin Tunnels, the Battle of Chipyong-ni and the Third Battle of Wonju between January and February 1951 marked a turning point in many ways for the entire Korean War.

== Background ==
When U.S. X Corps commander General Edward Almond received a request from Eighth Army commander General Matthew Ridgway on 30 January for a X Corps - Republic of Korea Army (ROKA) III Corps operation similar to Operation Thunderbolt, he was in the process of extending X Corps’ diversionary effort ordered earlier by Ridgway. Having achieved the Yoju-Wonju-Yongwol line against little opposition, Almond was planning a strong combat reconnaissance 15 miles (24 km) above this line. Searching that deep at Corps' center and right could apply pressure on the Korean People's Army (KPA) V and II Corps concentrated above Hoengsong and Pyongchang. At the same time, the U.S. 2nd Infantry Division, due to move north along the Corps' left boundary as far as Chip'yong-ni, 8 miles (13 km) east of Yangp'yong, could protect the right flank of IX Corps as Operation Thunderbolt continued.

In the recent course of protecting IX Corps' right, a joint motorized patrol from the 2nd and 24th Infantry Divisions on 29 January had moved north out of the Yoju area on the east side of the Han River to a pair of railroad tunnels and a connecting bridge standing east and west athwart a narrow valley 4 miles (6.4 km) south of Chip'yong-ni. PVA in the high ground overlooking the tunnels quickly cut the patrol's route of withdrawal, forced the group into hasty defenses on the nearest rises of ground, and opened a series of assaults. The PVA finally backed away after air strikes were called in by the pilot of an observation plane who spotted the ambush and after a motorized company of infantry reinforced the group about 03:30 on the 30th. The waylaid patrol had suffered five dead, 29 wounded, and five missing out of a total strength of forty-five. At the discovery of PVA at the twin tunnels, Almond ordered the 2nd Division to identify and destroy all enemy units in that area. The 23rd Infantry Regiment received the assignment. On 31 January Regimental Colonel Paul L. Freeman Jr. sent his 3rd Battalion and the attached French Battalion to the tunnels after placing the 37th Field Artillery Battalion within 1,000 yards (910 m) of the tunnel area in direct support. The infantry battalions reached and established a perimeter around the tunnel-bridge complex without sighting enemy forces. But from farther north Freeman's forces themselves were observed by the PVA 125th Division, 42nd Army.

== Battle ==
Army University Press presents Korea: Twin Tunnels. This documentary addresses how the U.S. Army fought in the Korean peninsula, while accentuating doctrine pertinent to today’s U.S. Army.

Near dawn on 1 February the 375th and 374th Regiments attacked from the north and northeast, respectively, and after daylight the 373rd Regiment assaulted the perimeter from the northwest and southwest. In hard, close-in fighting lasting all day, the defending battalions, relying heavily on artillery fire and on more than 80 air strikes finally forced the PVA to withdraw. Freeman's forces counted 1,300 enemy bodies outside their perimeter and estimated total PVA casualties at 3,600. Their own losses were 45 killed, 207 wounded and four missing.

== Aftermath ==
Judging from the two sharp actions at the twin tunnels, the PVA appeared determined to retain control of Chip'yong-ni. They had good reason as the town was situated so that the force occupying it could control movements over Route 2 to the west, over Route 24 to the northeast, over Routes 24 and 24A below town, and thus through the Yangp'yong-Ch'ungju segment of the Han River valley stretching to the southeast behind it. Eighth Army possession of Chip'yong-ni, furthermore, would pose a threat of envelopment to enemy forces opposing I and IX Corps below the Han River. For these same reasons Almond planned to seize Chip'yong-ni and incorporated this plan in his overall recommendations for an operation styled on Operation Thunderbolt. Also behind Almond's proposals were late January intelligence reports of a strong enemy force assembling around Hongcheon, at the intersection of Routes 24 and 29 20 miles (32 km) northeast of Chip'yong-ni and 15 miles (24 km) north of Hoengsong. This force, apparently part of the KPA V Corps, could be preparing to advance southwest on Route 24 through Chip'yong-ni, then down the Han valley toward Yoju and Ch'ungju. Or the V Corps might again push forces south on Route 29 through Hoengsong toward Wonju. To spoil either move, Almond considered Hongcheon the proper main objective of a X Corps attack. To disrupt both the KPA V Corps and II Corps, he outlined a coordinated X Corps-ROK III Corps advance, Operation Roundup.

== Bibliography ==
- David Halberstam's The Coldest Winter, 2007 ed., pages p. 505–588
