= Battle of Chipyong-ni =

1951 battle of the Korean War

Coordinates: 37.475°N 127.637°E

- Part of the Korean War
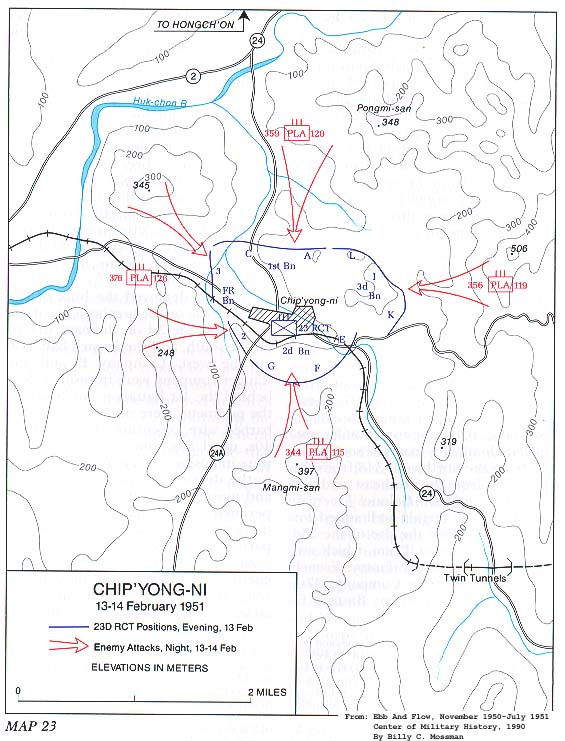
- Map of the Battle of Chipyong-ni on the night of 13–14 February 1951
Date	13–14 February 1951
Location	Chipyong-ni, South Korea
Result	United Nations victory

Belligerents
United Nations; United States; France	China

Commanders and leaders
(United States) Paul L. Freeman Jr. (France) Raoul Magrin-Vernerey	(China) Xu Guofu

Units involved
23rd Regimental Combat Team; 2nd Infantry Division; 23rd Infantry Regiment; 1st Ranger Company; 37th Field Artillery Battalion; 503rd Field Artillery Battalion; 82nd Antiaircraft Artillery Automatic Weapons Battalion; 2nd Engineer Battalion; French Battalion	(China) People's Volunteer Army

Strength
4,500	US sources: 25,000

Casualties and losses
US sources: 51 killed 250 wounded 42 missing	US sources: 2,000 killed 3,000 wounded 79 captured

The Battle of Chipyong-ni (French: Bataille de Chipyong-ni), also known as the Battle of Dipingli (Chinese: 砥平里战斗; pinyin: Dǐpínglǐ Zhàndòu), was a decisive battle of the Korean War that took place from 13 to 14 February 1951 between US and French units of the US 23rd Infantry Regiment and various units of the Chinese People's Volunteer Army (PVA) around the village of Chipyong-ni. The result was a United Nations Command (UN) victory. The battle, along with the Third Battle of Wonju, has been called "the Gettysburg of the Korean War".

== Background ==
After Chinese forces unexpectedly entered the Korean War in November 1950, the greatly outnumbered and surprised Republic of Korea Army (ROKA) and UN forces retreated below the 38th parallel. Plans were even made for complete withdrawal from the peninsula. Lieutenant general Matthew Ridgway decided to make a stand at Chipyong-ni and also at Wonju. He recognized that Chinese forces had overstretched their supply lines and would not be able to keep up their advance much longer. Ridgway intended to use the 23rd Regimental Combat Team to blunt the Chinese attack so that the Eighth Army could carry out a counterattack before the Chinese had a chance to consolidate their forces.

== Prelude ==
Following the Battle of the Twin Tunnels on 1 February 1951, the 23rd Regimental Combat Team (RCT) under the command of Colonel Paul L. Freeman Jr. reached the important crossroads town of Chipyong-ni on 3 February and immediately set up a perimeter defense. Over the next few days, the 23rd RCT dug in and was reinforced by artillery, tank, and engineer elements. By 13 February, their strength consisted of three infantry battalions; the French Battalion and 1st Ranger Company, both attached to the regiment; the 37th Field Artillery Battalion; Battery B, 82nd Antiaircraft Artillery Automatic Weapons Battalion; Battery B, 503rd Field Artillery Battalion; Company B, 2nd Engineer Battalion (Combat); elements of the 2nd Signal Co. (attached); and a platoon from the 2nd Medical Battalion. In all, Freeman had 4,500 men under his command, including 2,500 front-line infantrymen.

On 11 February, the Chinese attacked X Corps at Hoengsong as part of their Fourth Phase Offensive, driving back two divisions and leaving the 23rd Regiment at Chipyong-ni behind enemy lines and exposed to a Chinese attack.

The Chinese then sent the entirety of the 39th Army, and divisions of the 40th and 42nd armies to encircle and destroy Chipyong-ni.

On the morning of 13 February, after a patrol detected a significant Chinese presence on Route 24 to the north of the town, Lieutenant general Edward Almond, commander of X Corps, ordered the 23rd Regiment to withdraw to the Yoju area, 15 miles (24 km) to the south due to the danger of encirclement by Chinese forces. However, later on the same day, Ridgway reversed this decision after meeting with his superior, Douglas MacArthur. Ridgway insisted on attempting to hold Chipyong-ni, and directed Almond to attack north to relieve the regiment if it was cut off.

Informed of this, Freeman began to strengthen his defenses and requested resupply by air and airstrikes for 14 February. He deployed his 1st Battalion to the northern part of the perimeter, the 2nd to the south, and the 3rd on the east, with the French on the western side. The 1st Battalion's Company B and the Rangers were kept in reserve behind the 1st Battalion line.

== Battle ==
=== Day 1 ===
Throughout the day, Freeman kept advancing PVA forces at bay with artillery fire and air attacks. During the afternoon, the PVA took up positions around the 23rd's perimeter, though their attempts to advance were stopped by artillery. The U.S. forces observed heavy flare activity throughout the afternoon. Early in the evening, Freeman gathered his unit commanders and told them to expect an attack during the night.

Between 22:00 and 23:00, the PVA directed small arms and mortar fire at the Americans from the northwest, north, and southeast. C Company, positioned near Route 24 on the northern perimeter, was hit the hardest. Slightly after 23:00, PVA infantrymen moved down Hill 397, attacking E and G Companies. They were driven off, but shortly before 24:00, an intense mortar and artillery barrage hit C Company. After this, the defenders heard bugles, whistles, and bells, followed by a concerted infantry attack all along the perimeter. By midnight, only the 3rd Battalion in the east was not engaged. The attack was fierce but brief, intended to probe the defenses, ending in most places soon after midnight. Freeman's tight defensive formation prevented the attackers from outflanking his positions. At 02:00 a PVA platoon attacked the French Battalion. They closed to within 100 to 200 yards (91 to 183 m) of the French positions before launching their attack, but it was repulsed when the French defended themselves with grenades. G Company was attacked at 02:30 and 04:00. During the 04:00 attack, it was in danger of being overwhelmed, so a regimental tank was dispatched for support. The PVA attacked the 23rd Regiment at 06:30 and the French Battalion at 07:30. Both attacks ended in failure and the PVA withdrew into the mountains around Chipyong-ni.

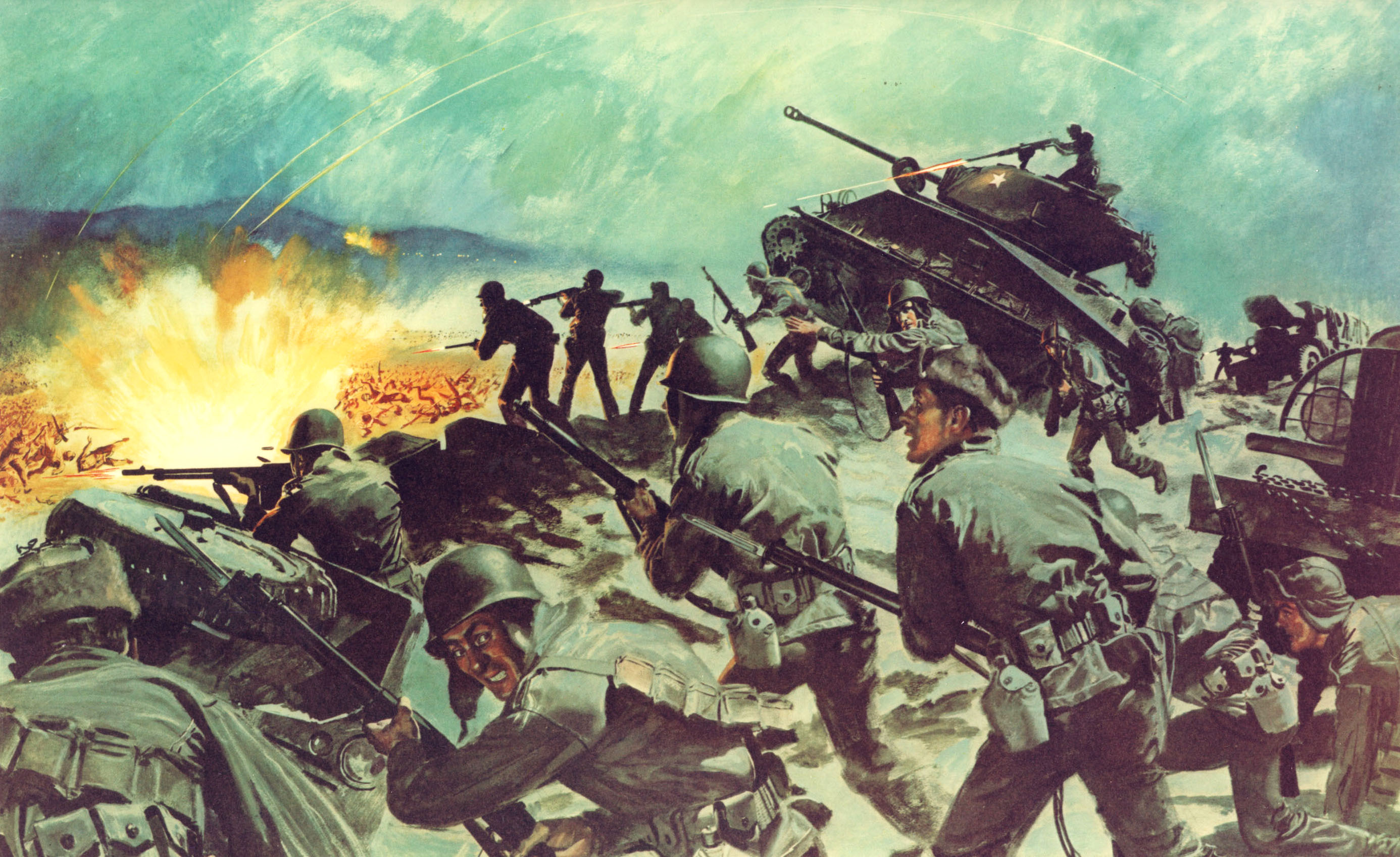
A US Army artist's illustration of the battle

=== Day 2 ===
By dawn on 14 February, Freeman had sustained about 100 casualties and had been hit in the leg by mortar fire. He retained his command despite the injury. Air support kept the PVA away during the daylight hours, but the Americans were running dangerously low on ammunition.

At dusk, artillery fire began to come down on the perimeter, followed soon after by infantry assaults. The 3rd Battalion was hit hard, and mortar fire rained down on the regimental command post for an hour. At midnight, the main assault began, with a PVA wave attack striking A Company, then veering over towards C Company and the French. By 01:30, K Company in the east had been assaulted twice, and everywhere the ammunition shortage was critical. Though Air Force planes airdropped ammunition, many soldiers were shot as they tried to reach it. Throughout the night, C-47 Skytrain transports dropped flares to provide illumination. At 02:30, I Company's perimeter was penetrated, the first successful penetration of the battle. Units of I Company, however, supported by L Company and the machine-gunners of M Company, counterattacked and restored the perimeter. Fighting was the fiercest in the south, where at around 03:15, PVA forces broke through the perimeter and forced the defenders out of their positions, a serious threat to the beleaguered regiment. At daybreak on 15 February, Freeman ordered the Ranger company, a platoon from F Company, and 14 men from G Company to counterattack, but they were driven back at 06:15 after sustaining heavy casualties in hand-to-hand fighting. At noon, B Company, in full view of the PVA and across open ground, attacked once more but was pinned down by PVA machine guns. By 12:30, it was still 9,000 yards (8,200 m) from what remained of the earlier counterattack.

About this time, at 15:45, units of the 5th Cavalry Regiment (Task Force Crombez) moved out from a town to the south to support the men at Chipyong-ni. At 14:00, the PVA retreated from their position inside the perimeter under pressure from an Air Force napalm bombardment and an attack by B Company, in which they lost 50% of their men. When B Company took the position at 16:30, its soldiers could see Task Force Crombez in the distance; the task force arrived at 17:25 with nearly 20 tanks. Now short of supplies, their roadblocks penetrated, and their casualties mounting, the PVA withdrew to the north.

=== The Chinese perspective ===
Prior to the battle, eight PVA infantry regiments (around 8,000 men) were deployed in the region: the 343rd and 344th Regiments (both from the 115th Division, 39th Army), the 356th and 357th Regiments (both from the 119th Division, 40th Army), the 359th Regiment (from the 120th Division, 40th Army), 375th Regiment (125th Division, 42nd Army), and the 376th and 377th Regiments (both from the 126th Division, 42nd Army).

According to the memoirs of Xu Guofu, commander of the 119th Division and also field commander of the Chinese forces at Chipyong-ni, five infantry regiments were deployed to attack the UN troops in this area by Deng Hua, third commander and commissar of the PVA. However, two regiments (the 343rd and 376th) lost their way in the dark and wound up in the wrong place. Due to poor communications, only three regiments (356th, 357th, and 359th) numbering around 3,000 soldiers, were actually committed to the attack on Chipyong-ni.

After a bloody fight overnight, on the morning of 15 February, Xu's troops broke through the perimeter and expected to launch another attack when night fell. But Xu received an order from Wen Yucheng, commander of the 40th Army, to withdraw as the Chinese discovered that there were over 6,000 UN troops in Chipyong-ni instead of the initial estimate of 1,000 men. In the aftermath of the battle, Xu insisted that the West overestimated PVA casualties. According to him, the three PVA regiments committed to the attack suffered a little over 900 casualties, one third of which were killed (Xu does not give figures for non-combat casualties or prisoners).

== Aftermath ==
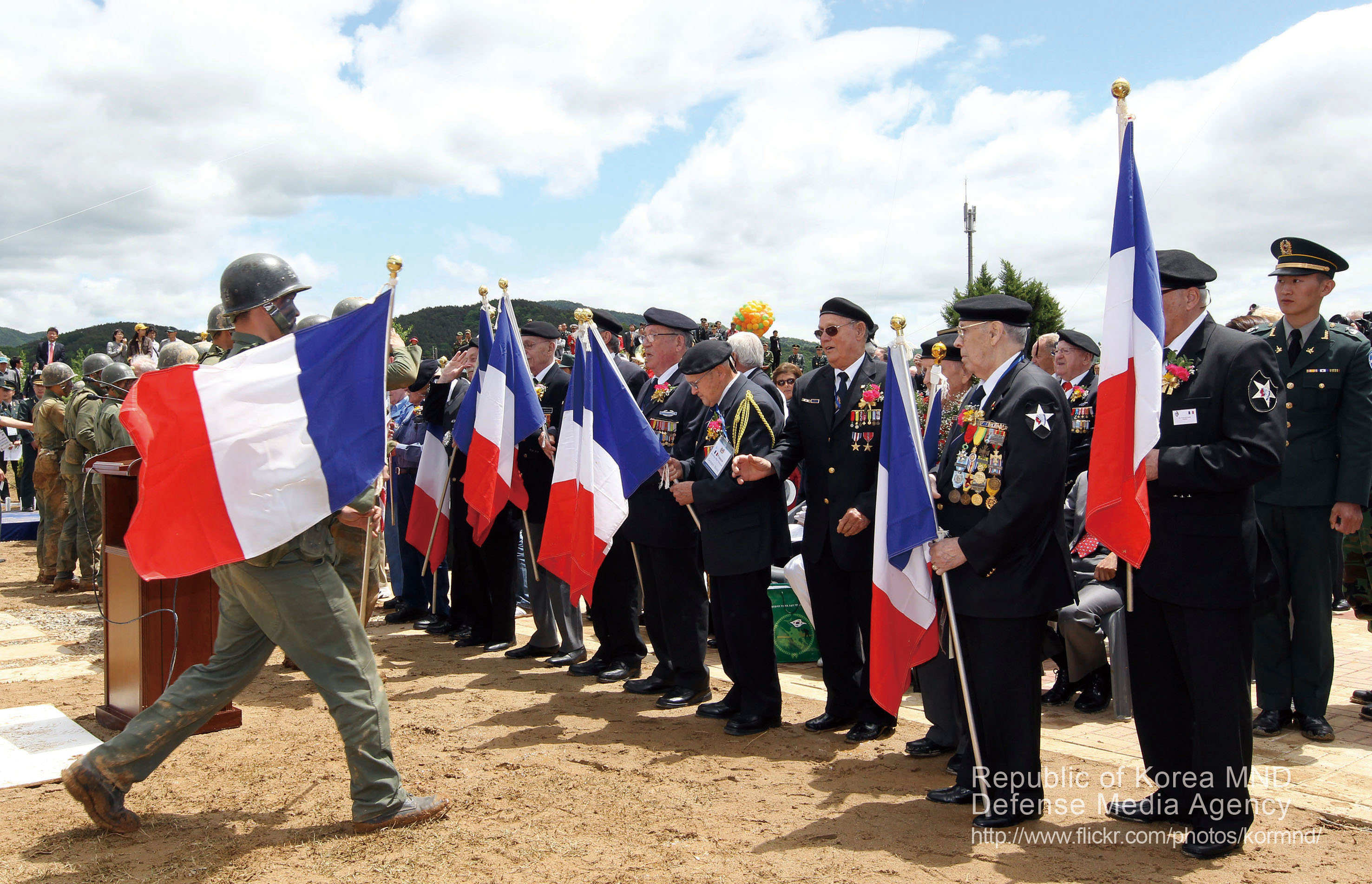
French veterans of the Battle of Chipyong-ni receive flags from South Korean soldiers during a victory ceremony in 2012.

UN casualties during the battle numbered 51 killed, 250 wounded, and 42 missing. The PVA lost approximately 2,000 killed and 3,000 wounded.

The battle offered a boost to the morale of Eighth Army, which had until then seen the Chinese as an invincible juggernaut. Soon afterwards, Operation Killer was launched, followed by Operation Ripper. The PVA, who had hopes of driving the UN forces to the sea, were themselves driven back. Eventually, this led to the start of peace negotiations in July 1951.

Ridgway spoke at a joint session of the US Congress on 22 May 1952:

I wish I could pay proper tribute to the magnificent conduct of the United Nations troops throughout these operations. It is difficult to single out any one unit or the forces of any one nation, but to illustrate I shall speak briefly about the Twenty-third United States Infantry Regiment, Colonel Paul L. Freeman commanding, with the French battalion and the normal components of artillery, engineer and medical personnel from the United States Second Infantry Division.

These troops in early February of 1951, sustained two of the severest attacks experienced during the entire Korean campaign. Twice isolated far in advance of the general battle line, twice completely surrounded in near zero weather, they repelled repeated assaults by day and night by vastly superior numbers of Chinese infantry. They were finally relieved by a armored column from the United States First Cavalry Division in as daring and dramatic an operation as the war provided.

Ridgway continued by saying:

I personally visited these magnificent men during both operations and personally directed the attack of the relieving armored column which finally broke through and contributed to the utter and final rout of the enemy forces. I want to record here my conviction that these American fighting men and their French comrades in arms measured up in every way to the battle conduct of the finest troops America or France has produced throughout their national existence.

The headquarters of the Chinese XIX Army Group, in a critique of the battle which was later captured and translated, described the shock of the armored spearhead which battered its way into Chipyong-Ni:

At 1600 more than 20 enemy tanks coming to reinforce CHIPYONG-NI from the direction of KOKSU-RI, surprised us; by being almost at the door of the Regimental CP [Command Post] before they were discovered, seriously threatening the flanks and rear of the 2d Battalion.

and continued

In the conduct of the entire campaign, or the battle command, we have underestimated the enemy. In view of their past characteristics in battle, we expected them to flee at CHIPYONG-NI after the enemy at HOENGSON was annihilated ... We have been taught a lesson at the expense of bloodshed.

== Awards ==
On 20 February, Sergeant First Class William S. Sitman, a machine gun section leader in M Company, was posthumously awarded the Medal of Honor for bravery during the battle after he threw himself on a grenade to save five of his fellow soldiers. On 3 January 2025, Private Bruno R. Orig was posthumously awarded the Medal of Honor for his actions on 15 January 1951, manning a machine-gun allowing a platoon to safely withdraw.

After the battle, the 23rd RCT and all attached units were awarded the United States Army Distinguished Unit Citation.
