= General Stilwell (disambiguation) =

Joseph Stilwell (1883–1946) was a U.S. Army general in World War II. General Stilwell may also refer to:

- Joseph Warren Stilwell Jr. (1912–1966), U.S. Army brigadier general
- Richard G. Stilwell (1917–1991), U.S. Army general
