= William S. Sitman =

United States Army Medal of Honor recipient

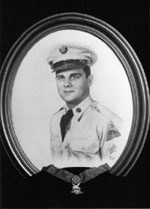
- Medal of Honor recipient William Sitman
- Born: August 9, 1923; Bellwood, Pennsylvania
- Died: February 14, 1951 (aged 27) near Chipyong-ni, Korea
- Burial place: Logan Valley Cemetery, Bellwood, Pennsylvania
- Military career
- Allegiance: United States of America
- Branch: United States Army
- Service years: 1943–1951
- Rank: Sergeant First Class
- Units: Company M, 23rd Infantry Regiment, 2nd Infantry Division
- Conflicts: Korean War †
- Awards: Medal of Honor; Bronze Star Medal (2); Purple Heart

William Samuel Sitman (August 9, 1923 – February 14, 1951) was a soldier in the United States Army during the Korean War. He posthumously received the Medal of Honor for his actions on February 14, 1951, during the Battle of Chipyong-ni.

Sitman joined the Army from his birthplace of Bellwood, Pennsylvania in February 1943.

== Biography ==
=== World War II ===
In 1943, William Sitman enlisted in the United States Army. After graduating from basic training. He would be assigned to the 83rd Reconnaissance Battalion. Part of the 83rd Infantry Division, He would deploy to Europe in 1944, seeing combat in France, Belgium and Germany, during which he received a Bronze Star for Gallantry.

== Medal of Honor Citation ==
Rank and organization: Sergeant First Class, U.S. Army, Company M, 23rd Infantry Regiment, 2nd Infantry Division

Place and date: Near Chipyong-ni, Korea, February 14, 1951

Entered service at: Bellwood, Pennsylvania, Birth: Bellwood, Pennsylvania

G.O. No.: 20, February 1, 1952

Citation:

Sfc. Sitman distinguished himself by conspicuous gallantry and intrepidity above and beyond the call of duty in action against an armed enemy of the United Nations. Sfc. Sitman, a machine gun section leader of Company M, was attached to Company I, under attack by a numerically superior hostile force. During the encounter when an enemy grenade knocked out his machine gun, a squad from Company I, immediately emplaced a light machine gun and Sfc. Sitman and his men remained to provide security for the crew. In the ensuing action, the enemy lobbed a grenade into the position and Sfc. Sitman, fully aware of the odds against him, selflessly threw himself on it, absorbing the full force of the explosion with his body. Although mortally wounded in this fearless display of valor, his intrepid act saved 5 men from death or serious injury, and enabled them to continue inflicting withering fire on the ruthless foe throughout the attack. Sfc. Sitman's noble self-sacrifice and consummate devotion to duty reflect lasting glory on himself and uphold the honored traditions of the military service.

== Awards and decorations ==
SFC Sittman received the following awards for his service

Badge	Combat Infantryman Badge with star denoting 2nd award		
1st row	Medal of Honor		Bronze Star Medal with "V" Device and 1 Oak leaf cluster
2nd row	Purple Heart	Army Good Conduct Medal	American Campaign Medal
3rd row	European-African-Middle Eastern Campaign Medal with 5 Campaign stars	World War II Victory Medal	National Defense Service Medal
4th row	Korean Service Medal with 1 Campaign star	United Nations Service Medal Korea	Korean War Service Medal Retroactively Awarded, 2003
Unit awards	Presidential Unit Citation		Korean Presidential Unit Citation

83rd Infantry Division Insignia	2nd Infantry Division Insignia

== See also ==
- List of Medal of Honor recipients
- List of Korean War Medal of Honor recipients
