= Battle of Chu Dreh Pass =

Last battle of the First Indochina War

- Part of the First Indochina War
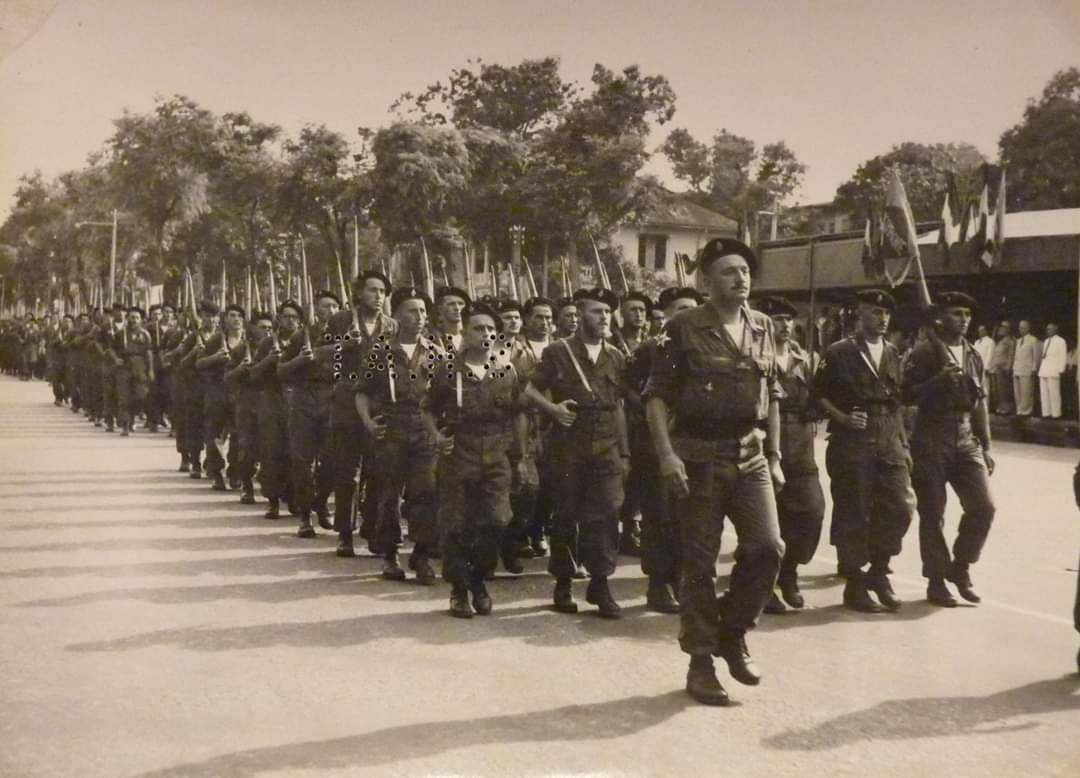
- Bataillon de Corée arrives in Indochina in 1953, by July 1954 the force would be effectively wiped out
Date	17 July 1954
Location	Chu Dreh Pass, Vietnam
Result	Việt Minh victory

Belligerents
French Union: France; French Indochina; State of Vietnam	Democratic Republic of Vietnam: (North Vietnam) Việt Minh

Commanders and leaders
Jacques Sockeel	Unknown

Units involved
Groupement Mobile No. 42	96th Regiment (Elements)

Casualties and losses
~600 casualties 47 vehicles and tanks destroyed	Unknown

The Battle of Chu-Dreh Pass also known as the Ambush at Chu-Dreh Pass and Operation Myosotis was the last battle of the First Indochina War between French Union and Viet Minh forces that took place on 17 July 1954, in the Central Highlands of French Indochina. It ended with the French battle group, 'Groupement Mobile No. 42' suffering heavy losses and the near destruction of the veteran Corée battalion. This was the last battle of the war with the Geneva Accords signed just four days later.

== Background ==
On 15 November 1953, the French regimental task force unit of the French Far East Expeditionary Corps 'Groupement Mobile No. 100' ("Mobile Group 100" or GM.100) which included the elite veteran UN 'Bataillon de Corée' (I/Corée) that had fought in the Korean War was transferred to French Indochina.

On 24 June 1954, not long after the surrender of the French garrison at Dien Bien Phu the French Chief of Staff ordered GM.100 to abandon its defensive positions at An Khe and fall back to Pleiku, some 50 miles (80 km) away over Route Coloniale 19 code named opération Églantine. GM.100 was hit in a series of deadly ambushes in the Battle of Mang Yang Pass, suffering heavy losses in men and vehicles by 29 June. They fell back to Pleiku where they reorganized and re-equipped with the help of 'Groupement Mobile No. 42' (GM.42).

On 29 June, the French headquarters in the coastal town of Nha Trang received intelligence that the Viet Minh had infiltrated the area along Route Coloniale 14 between Pleiku and Ban Mê Thuột. GM.42 led by veteran Lieutenant colonel Jacques Sockeel, was to be sent out on Operation Myosotis (Forget-Me-Not) with orders to keep the road open. They were also to relieve an outpost held by a company of regular troops and some 30 guerrillas 85 km South of Pleiku. GM.42 was composed of three mountaineer infantry battalions (which included Montagnards). There was also the 4th Vietnamese Artillery Group, the two remaining companies of I/Corée and a reinforced armoured platoon of the Third Squadron of the 5th ("Royal Poland") Cuirassiers Armoured Cavalry.

== Battle ==
On Bastille Day, 14 July, the task force took to the road, and two days later at dusk, the various units had reached Ea H'leo. The French having learned some of the lessons from Mang Yang Pass had prepared themselves in case of another ambush - the artillery were pushed up to support the front units, while infantry units and vehicles established temporary defensive positions. The artillery themselves would be supported by tanks when they moved up. In addition, they would have aerial support from B-26 bombers flying from bases in Nha Trang.

On 17 July the GM.42 column was passing through areas of potential ambush sites, but nothing was seen, and no attacks took place. As they approached the dangerous Chu Dreh Pass, the Montagnard infantry slowly got through without trouble, while I/Corée and the artillery formed the rearguard. At 10:50, they had left the southern end of the pass when the 8th Montagnard battalion and the Brigade HQ of I/Corée were suddenly attacked by the Viet Minh. These were local units from the 96th Regiment which opened up on the convoy with 81mm mortars, 60mm mortars, and Recoilless rifles.

The Viet Minh managed to create choke points at both the northern and southern ends of the pass. The soft skinned vehicles were targeted and soon a dozen trucks were blazing between the ends of the pass. Two companies of the 8th Montagnard battalion and the 4th company of I/Corée were destroyed within an hour. Other units around the choke points of the ambush were trying to fight their way out northwards by leap frogging, and at the same time dragging their wounded. Most of the French radios were knocked out causing chaos and confusion. It meant that on the south side of the pass, the rest of GM.42 not realising what was going on further up, were attempting to stave off an ambush there. They managed to call in air support from the B-26s, which eventually managed to help their situation. Nevertheless, the 5th (Royal Poland) Cuirassiers' tanks and vehicles meanwhile arrived at the pass not realising the plight of their cohorts and they too were hit.

The Viet Minh then stormed the vehicles with infantry in the hope of capturing their guns and radio sets. Soon they were crawling over the armoured vehicles and tanks. The 'Royal Poland' despite the heavy losses they had sustained, saved I/Corée from being completely wiped out.

By 14:00 the Viet Minh broke off their attack satisfied with the destruction they had inflicted. The French managed to withdraw, but it took some time for the survivors who managed to escape the ambush to arrive at Buôn Ma Thuột. All had arrived by 25 July.

== Aftermath ==
When the survivors finally arrived at Buôn Ma Thuột, they counted the cost. GM.42 overall had suffered heavy losses: some 600 killed, wounded or captured, with a further 47 vehicles lost. The Battalion Corée which had begun the year with some 800 men, and down to 400 by July, now had only 107 left in their ranks, with around half that number being walking wounded - some 500 men were killed, with another 200 prisoners of war; it effectively ceased to exist as a fighting unit. Viet Minh troops did show some mercy by sending a message to the French outpost at Ea H'leo by leaving 37 wounded on a road near to the ambush site a few days after the ambush, where they could be picked up without hindrance. The outpost there was abandoned on 20 July when the local partisans abandoned their weapons and the post. The handful of Frenchmen that were left broke out and retreated through the deep jungle and after an exhausting four day trek, all made it back to Ban Dôn, a small village just North of Buôn Ma Thuột.

The Viet Minh had by this time conquered a substantial part of the Central Highlands including the towns of Kontum and An Khê. On 21 July, a battlefield ceasefire was announced when the Geneva agreements were signed. On 1 August, the armistice went into effect, sealing the end of French Indochina, and the partition of Vietnam along the 17th parallel.

On 1 September the French High Command in Indochina dissolved what was left of both GM.100. and GM.42.

== Bibliography ==
- Clodfelter, Micheal (2017). Warfare and Armed Conflicts A Statistical Encyclopedia of Casualty and Other Figures, 1492-2015, 4th Ed. McFarland, Incorporated, Publishers. ISBN 9780786474707.
- Eggleston, Michael A (2017). Dak To and the Border Battles of Vietnam, 1967-1968 McFarland. McFarland, Incorporated, Publishers. ISBN 9781476664170.
- Fall, Bernard (2005). Street Without Joy: The French Debacle in Indochina. Stackpole Military History. ISBN 9780811732369.
- Harris, J P (2016). Vietnam's High Ground Armed Struggle for the Central Highlands, 1954-1965. University Press of Kansas. ISBN 9780700622832.
- Summers, Harry G (1995). Historical Atlas of the Vietnam War. Houghton Mifflin Company. ISBN 9780395722237.
- Windrow, Martin (2004). The Last Valley. New York: Da Capo Press. ISBN 0-306-81386-6.
