= Jipyeong-ri =

- Interactive map of Jipyeong-ri
- Coordinates: 37.475000°N 127.637000°E
- Country: South Korea
- Province: Gyeonggi
- County: Yangpyeong

Korean name
- Hangul: 지평리
- Hanja: 砥平里
- RR: Jipyeong-ri
- MR: Chip'yŏng-ri

Jipyeong-ri (Korean: 지평리) is a village in Jije-myeon, Yangpyeong County, Gyeonggi Province, South Korea.

== History ==
Jipyeong-ri was the site of the Battle of Chipyong-ni during the Korean War, February 1951. A memorial has been erected at the site, which is split into three portions — South Korean, US, and French. The area was an important transportation and communication hub.

The battle is sometimes known as the Gettysburg of the Korean War. The battle saw 5,600 South Korean, US, and French forces under the command of Colonel Paul L. Freeman, 23rd Infantry Regiment, defeat a numerically superior Chinese force in hard fighting. Surrounded on all sides, the 2nd Infantry Division’s 23rd Regiment with the attached French Battalion was hemmed in by more than 25,000 Chinese Communist Forces around Jipyeong-ri. United Nations forces had previously retreated in the face of the Communist forces instead of getting cut off, but this time they stood and fought. The allies fought at odds of roughly 15 to 1.

On the third day of fighting, units of the 5th Cavalry Regiment punched a hole in the Chinese lines relieving the 23rd Regiment.

The victory is considered so decisive that the Chinese began peace overtures soon after.

Sergeant First Class William S. Sitman, a Medal of Honor recipient and Bellwood, Pennsylvania native was killed during the battle.

Various older historical landmarks are located there, including the Jipyeong hyanggyo (village school) and a three-story stone pagoda from the Goryeo period.

== See also ==
- Eighth United States Army
- Korean War Veterans Memorial
- War Memorial of Korea
