= Bruno R. Orig =

Medal of Honor recipient (1930–1951)

- Born: 1 January 1930
- Died: 15 February 1951 (aged 21)
- Burial place: National Memorial Cemetery of the Pacific
- Military career
- Allegiance: United States
- Branch: United States Army
- Service years: 1950–1951
- Rank: Private
- Units: Company G, 2nd Battalion, 23rd Infantry Regiment
- Conflicts: Korean War: Battle of Chipyong-ni †
- Awards: Medal of Honor; Purple Heart

Bruno R. Orig (January 1930 – 15 February 1951) was a United States Army soldier who was posthumously awarded the Medal of Honor on 3 January 2025 for his actions during the Battle of Chipyong-ni in the Korean War.

== Early life ==
Bruno Orig was born in January 1930, in Honolulu, Hawaii. He was one of eight children raised in Honolulu by his mother Gregoria, father Hilario Orig (who died at age 41) and stepfather Leon Omboy. All three of his parents came to Hawaii from the Philippines. He graduated from Farrington High School in 1949.

== Military career ==
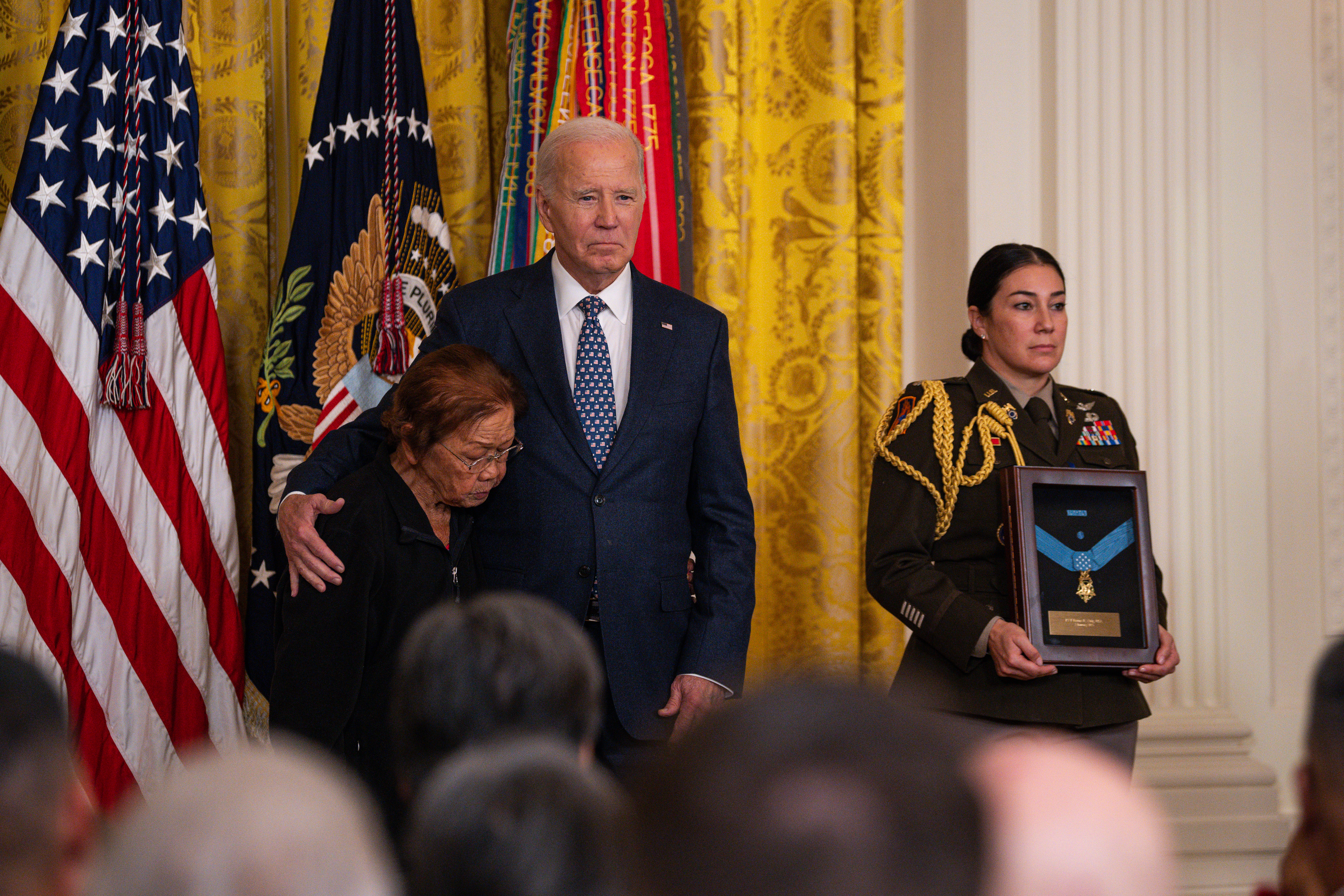
Predident Joe Biden with Loretta Orig, sister of former U.S. Army Pvt. Bruno R. Orig, during the reading of Pvt. Orig's Medal of Honor citation

Orig enlisted in the United States Army in August 1950 and was trained as a light weapons infantryman. He was assigned to Company G, 2nd Battalion, 23rd Infantry Regiment, 2nd Infantry Division, in South Korea. After only three months in country, Orig distinguished himself by extraordinary heroism in action against enemy forces in the vicinity of Chipyong-ni on 15 February 1951.

During fierce fighting, Orig moved his fellow wounded soldiers to a place of safety and noticed that all except one man of a machine-gun crew had been wounded. Without hesitation, he volunteered to man the weapon. Remaining in this position, Orig placed such effective fire on the enemy that a withdrawing friendly platoon was able to move back without a single casualty. He continued to inflict heavy casualties on the enemy until the company positions were overrun. Later that day, when the lost ground was recaptured, Orig was found dead beside his weapon and the area in front of his gun was littered with enemy dead.

Orig was originally awarded the Distinguished Service Cross which was upgraded to the Medal of Honor on 3 January 2025.

== Medal of Honor citation ==
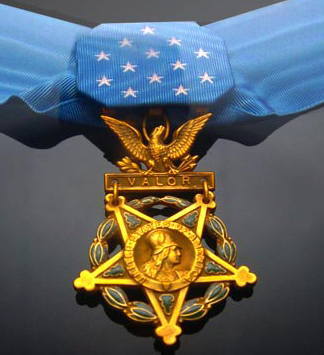

The President of the United States of America, authorized by Act of Congress March 3rd, 1863, has awarded in the name of Congress the Medal of Honor to Private Bruno R. Orig distinguished himself by acts of gallantry and intrepidity above and beyond the call of duty, while serving with Company G, 23rd infantry Regiment, 2nd Infantry Division in the vicinity of Chipyong-ni Korea, on February 15, 1951. While returning from a wire laying mission, Private Orig observed a number of his comrades who had been wounded in a fierce enemy attack that was still in progress. With complete disregard for his own safety, Private Orig went to the aid of these men and remained in an exposed position in order to administer first aid to them. With the assistance of several comrades from the company command post, Private Orig began removing the wounded to a place of safety. While returning from one of these trips, Private Orig noticed that all except one man of a machine gun crew had been wounded. Without hesitation, he volunteered to man the weapon. Remaining in this position, Private Orig placed such effective fire on the enemy that a withdrawing friendly platoon was able to move back without a single casualty. Private Orig continued to inflict heavy casualties on the enemy until the company positions were overrun. Later that day, when the lost ground was recaptured, Private Orig was found dead beside his weapon and the area in front of his gun was littered with enemy dead. Private Orig’s extraordinary heroism and selflessness above and beyond the call of duty were in keeping with the highest traditions of military service and reflect great credit upon himself, his unit, and the United States Army.

== Awards and decorations ==
Private Orig received the following awards for his service:

Badge	Combat Infantryman Badge		
1st row	Medal of Honor		
2nd row	Medal of Honor Upgraded from DSC, 2025	Purple Heart	National Defense Service Medal
3rd row	Korean Service Medal with 1 Campaign star	United Nations Service Medal Korea	Korean War Service Medal Retroactively Awarded, 2003
Unit awards	Presidential Unit Citation		Korean Presidential Unit Citation

== See also ==
- List of Korean War Medal of Honor recipients
