= French Battalion =

UN military unit of the Korean War

French Battalion of the UNO
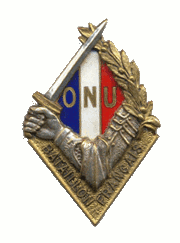
- Bataillon français de l'ONU
- Active: 1950–1953
- Country: France
- Allegiance: United Nations
- Branch: Army
- Type: Infantry
- Size: 3,763
- Part of: US 2nd Infantry Division
- Engagements: Korean War: First and Second Battle of Wonju; Battle of the Twin Tunnels; Battle of Chipyong-ni; Battle of Heartbreak Ridge; Battle of Arrowhead Hill
- Decorations: Croix de guerre des théâtres d'opérations extérieures with 4 Palms, 3 US Presidential Unit Citation, 2 ROK Presidential Unit Citations

Commanders
- Commander: Raoul Magrin-Vernerey

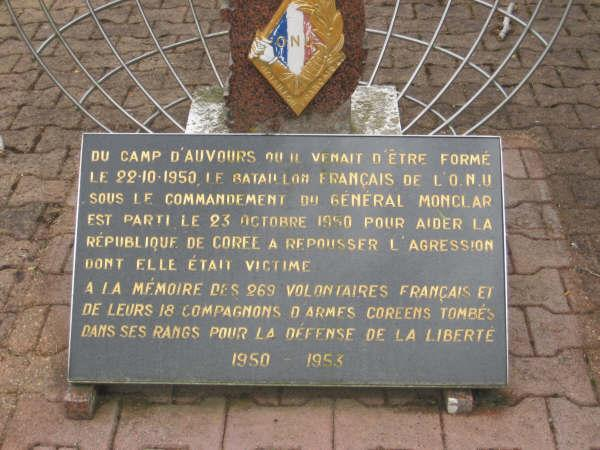
Badge and plaque to commemorate the battalion of Korea 1950–1953, French battalion of the United Nations, it is inscribed, "From the Auvours camp where it had been formed on 22 October 1950, the French battalion of the United Nations under the command of General Monclar departed on 23 October 1950 to help the Republic of Korea repel an attack which it fell victim to. In memory of the 269 French volunteers and their 18 Korean comrades-in-arms who fell in its ranks in defense of freedom, 1950–1953.

The French Battalion of the United Nations Organisation (French: Bataillon français de l'Organisation des Nations unies, or BF-ONU) was a battalion of volunteers made up of active and reserve French military personnel sent to the Korean Peninsula as part of the UN force fighting in the Korean War.

== Korea ==
Lieutenant General Raoul Magrin-Vernerey, better known under his nom de guerre, Monclar, Inspector of the French Foreign Legion and a hero of World War II, supported Chief of Staff of the French Army General Clément Blanc's decision to form a volunteer force and agreed to command the new unit, accepting a demotion back to the rank of lieutenant-colonel. The French Battalion arrived in Pusan, South Korea on November 29, 1950, and was placed under the operational control of the U.S. 23rd Infantry Regiment, 2nd Infantry Division. Despite initial fears about French forces being "on the rout", the battalion carried out several successful early actions and earned the respect of General Matthew Ridgway, commander of the U.S. Eighth Army.

From January 7–12, 1951, the French Battalion participated in the First and Second Battle of Wonju where it stopped the North Korean advance. It was followed by the Battle of the Twin Tunnels (February 1–2, 1951) and of Chipyong-ni (February 3–16, 1951). These battles, during which the battalion resisted the attacks of four Chinese divisions for three days, allowed the 8th Army to score a victorious counter-offensive. Three weeks later, the battalion was engaged in combat for Hill 1037 (about 50 miles east of Seoul) and lost 40 dead and 200 wounded while attacking and capturing the hill.

In the spring of 1951, the battalion crossed the 38th parallel into the Hwacheon region. The destruction of an engineering platoon led to a partial rout of the French Battalion. However, it allowed U.S. forces to stop the new Chinese offensive. In the fall of 1951, the French took part in the Battle of Heartbreak Ridge. In the course of these combats which lasted a month, 60 French soldiers were killed and 200 were wounded. In the fall of 1952, after a lethal war of positions, similar to the Battle of Verdun during World War I, the battalion put a halt in Chongwon, South Korea, to a Chinese offensive toward Seoul. This resistance resulted in 47 dead and 144 wounded. The total Chinese losses against the French battalion were estimated at 2000 men. In the winter and the spring of 1953, the battalion took part in battles which kept the North Korean and Chinese forces from reaching Seoul.

After the signing of the Korean Armistice Agreement in July 1953, the French Battalion left Korea with five French Citations to the Order of the Army; the French Fourragère in the colors of the Military Medal; two Korean Presidential Citations; and three American Distinguished Unit Citations. Forty-four of the French casualties were eventually buried at the United Nations Memorial Cemetery in Busan, South Korea.

In an address to a joint session of the United States Congress on 22 May 1952, General Ridgway said the following:

...I shall speak briefly of the Twenty-Third United States Infantry Regiment, Col. Paul L. Freeman commanding, with the French battalion... Twice isolated far in advance of the general battle line, twice completely surrounded in near zero weather, they repelled repeated assaults by day and night by vastly superior numbers of Chinese infantry...I want to record here my conviction that these American fighting men with their French comrades in arms measured up in every way to the battle conduct of the finest troops America or France has produced throughout their national existence.

One member of the French Battalion, Louis Misseri, was awarded the Distinguished Service Cross by the United States for his actions. His citation reads:

The Distinguished Service Cross is presented to Louis Misseri, Sergeant, Army of France, for extraordinary heroism in connection with military operations against an armed enemy of the United Nations while serving with the Third Company, French Battalion, attached to the 23rd Infantry Regiment, 2nd Infantry Division, in action against enemy forces at Pia-ri, Korea on September 26, 1951. As a squad leader in an attack on "Heartbreak Ridge," Sergeant Misseri led his squad through an intense barrage of enemy mortar and artillery fire to the slope on which enemy bunkers were located. Dividing his squad into two sections, he personally led one section of three men in an assault upon the bunkers. While his comrades covered his advance, he moved forward alone through a hail of fire, attacked the first bunker, and silenced it. He continued his assault until the way had been cleared for his squad to advance and reorganize. When the enemy launched a counterattack, Sergeant Misseri, although seriously wounded, drove them back, inflicting fifteen casualties with his rifle. When this position became untenable and he was ordered to withdraw, he sent his men back one by one while he covered their withdrawal. The last man to leave the hill, except for one other who helped him because of his wounded condition, he would not allow himself to be evacuated until he had made a complete report of his mission. One of the very few men to reach the top of "Heartbreak Ridge" during this costly attack, Sergeant Misseri's gallantry and extraordinary devotion to duty reflect the highest credit on him and uphold the finest traditions of the Army and the Republic of France.

Paul L. Freeman Jr., the commander of the 23rd Infantry Regiment, said of the French Battalion:

When you order them [the French] in defence, you're sure they'll hold the position. When you show them a hill to be seized, you're sure they'll manage to get atop. You may leave for two days, storms of shells and waves of enemies may swarm over them, the French are still there!

== Post Korea ==
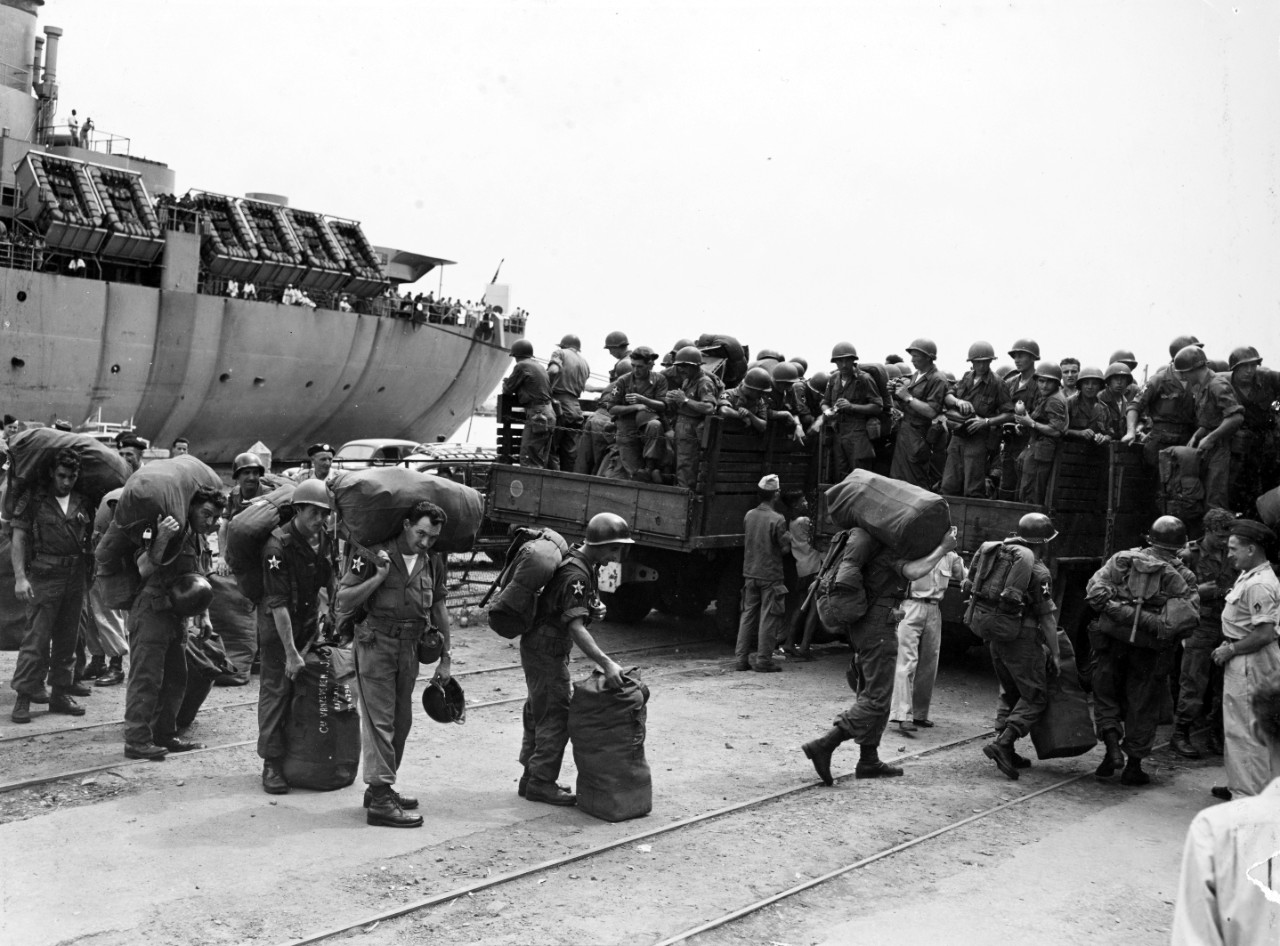
French Battalion disembarks from the USS General W. M. Black in Saigon, 1 November 1953

On October 22, 1953, the French battalion embarked on the USS General W. M. Black and headed for Indochina, where it was expanded into a two battalion regiment and formed the nucleus of the French Groupement mobile 100. During their service in Indochina, the unit (under its new title of Le Regiment de Corée) participated in the brutal battles Mang Yang Pass along Route coloniale 19 in June 1954, and Chu Dreh Pass along Route Coloniale 14 a month later, where it suffered heavy casualties. Between its arrival in Indochina and the cease-fire on July 20, 1954, the 1st Battalion suffered 238 killed or wounded, and the 2nd Battalion 202 killed or wounded. In addition, 34 Indochinese assigned to the battalion were killed in action. On September 1, 1954, the Regiment de Corée was disbanded and reduced to battalion size. The battalion remained in Indochina until July 17, 1955, when it embarked from Saigon to Algeria to participate in the suppression of the ongoing insurrection.

On August 10, 1955, the battalion landed in Algiers and began a series of garrison and search-and-destroy operations in the Constantine Department. On September 1, 1960, the battalion was amalgamated with the 156th Infantry Regiment (French: 156^{e} Régiment d'Infanterie) and received the designation of 156^{e} Régiment d'Infanterie- Régiment de Corée. All told, the regiment suffered 48 killed in action in Algeria. The regiment was repatriated to France after the Évian Accords and disbanded upon its return to France in 1962.

== Later Honours ==
The French Battalion was honored in its history by the 203 student-officers of the 29th class of the EMIA (1989-1991) taking the name "Bataillon de Coree" citing the reason for their decision "both the intensity of the fighting and for the disproportion between a single unit representing France and the mass of North Korean and Chinese soldiers pouring down by thousand"

== See also ==
- United Nations Forces in the Korean War
- Crèvecoeur (1955)
- Medical support in the Korean War
- Military history of France
- (in French) French participation in the Korean War Forces françaises dans la guerre de Corée
