= Ea H'leo =

Ea H'leo Xã Ea H'leo
- Rural commune
- Location within Vietnam
- Coordinates: 13°21′5″N 108°9′27″E
- Country: Vietnam
- Region: Central Highlands
- Province: Đắk Lắk

Area
  - Total: 131.30 sq mi (340.06 km^{2})

Population (2025)
  - Total: 15,625
- Time zone: UTC+7 (UTC + 7)

Ea H'leo is a rural commune (xã) of Đắk Lắk Province, Vietnam.
