= Monclar-de-Quercy =

- Commune
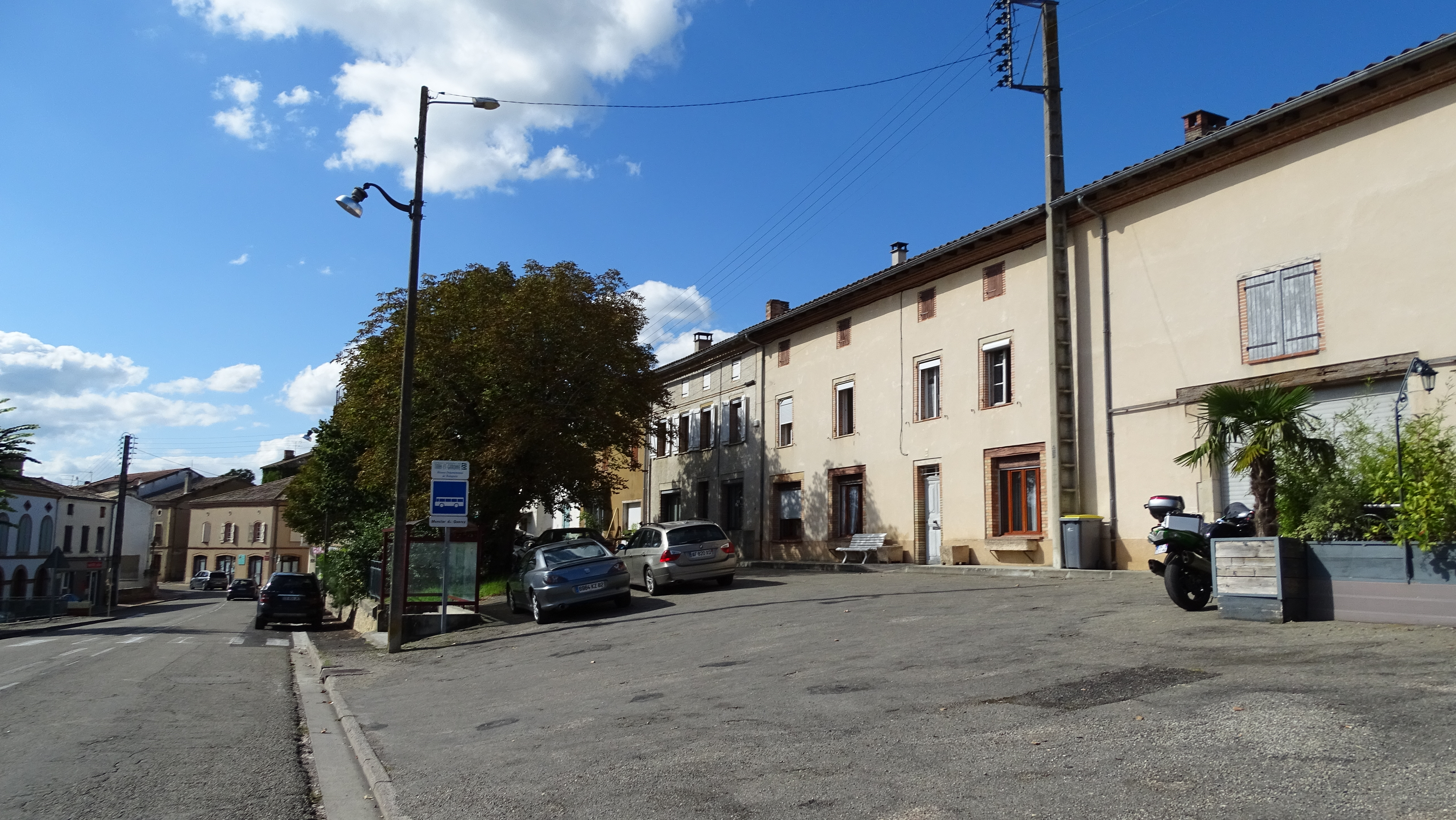
- A view within Monclar-de-Quercy

- Coat of arms
- Location of Monclar-de-Quercy
- Location within France Location within Occitanie
- Coordinates: 43°58′03″N 1°35′07″E
- Country: France
- Region: Occitania
- Department: Tarn-et-Garonne
- Arrondissement: Montauban
- Canton: Tarn-Tescou-Quercy vert
- Intercommunality: Quercy Vert-Aveyron

Government
  - Mayor (2020–2026): Jean-Paul Albert
- Area^{1}: 37.75 km^{2} (14.58 sq mi)
- Elevation: 203 m (666 ft)
- Highest elevation: 247 m (810 ft)
- Lowest elevation: 133 m (436 ft)
- Population (2023): 2,055
  - Density: 54.44/km^{2} (141.0/sq mi)
- Time zone: UTC+01:00 (CET)
  - Summer (DST): UTC+02:00 (CEST)
- INSEE/Postal code: 82115 /82230
- ^{1} French Land Register data, which excludes lakes, ponds, glaciers > 1 km^{2} (0.386 sq mi or 247 acres) and river estuaries.

Monclar-de-Quercy (French pronunciation: [mɔ̃klaʁ də kɛʁsi], literally Monclar of Quercy; Occitan: Montclar de Carcin) is a commune in the Tarn-et-Garonne department in the Occitanie region in southern France.

== Population ==
Historical population
Year	Pop.	±% p.a.
1968	1,153	—
1975	949	−2.74%
1982	980	+0.46%
1990	1,086	+1.29%
1999	1,265	+1.71%
2007	1,522	+2.34%
2012	1,881	+4.33%
2017	1,993	+1.16%
2023	2,055	+0.51%
Source: INSEE

== See also ==
- Communes of the Tarn-et-Garonne department
