= Joseph W. Stilwell Jr. =

United States Army general (1912–1966)

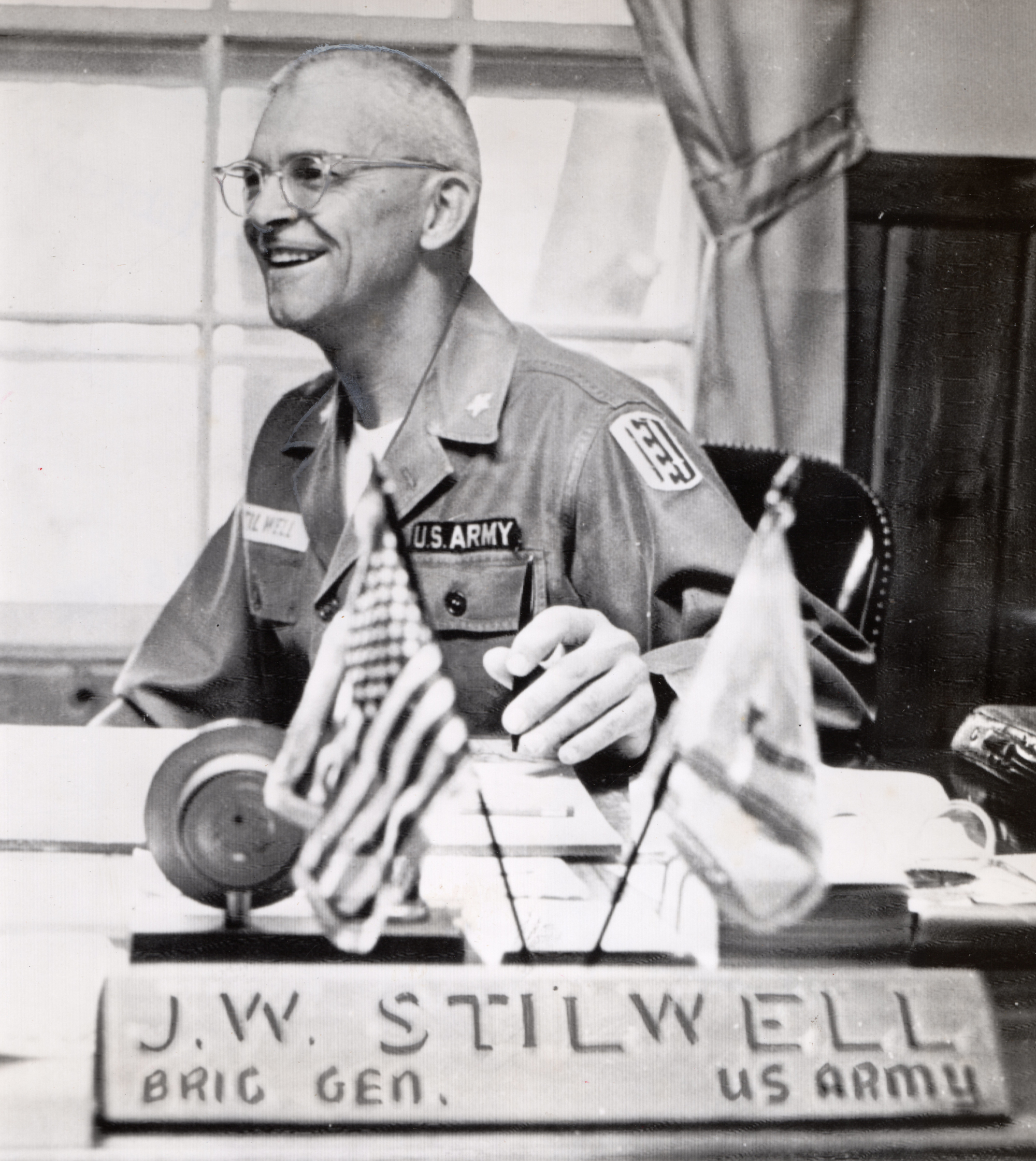
- Stilwell as 2nd Infantry Brigade commander c. 1961
- Born: March 6, 1912; Syracuse, New York, US
- Died: July 25, 1966 (aged 54); Pacific Ocean
- Relatives: Joseph Stilwell (father)
- Military career
- Allegiance: United States
- Branch: United States Army
- Service years: 1933–1966
- Rank: Brigadier General
- Nicknames: "Jumping Joe" "Gunner Six" "Cider Joe"
- Commands: 23rd Infantry Regiment; XVIII Airborne Corps; United States Army Support Group; United States Army JFK Special Warfare Center; United States Army Special Forces Command
- Conflicts: World War II; Korean War; Vietnam War
- Awards: Army Distinguished Service Medal; Legion of Merit (2); Distinguished Flying Cross; Soldier's Medal; Bronze Star Medal (4); Purple Heart (2); Air Medal (26)

Brigadier General Joseph Warren Stilwell Jr. (March 6, 1912 – July 25, 1966) was a United States Army general best known for his service in United States Army Special Forces and the United States Army Support Group in the Vietnam War.

== Early life and education ==
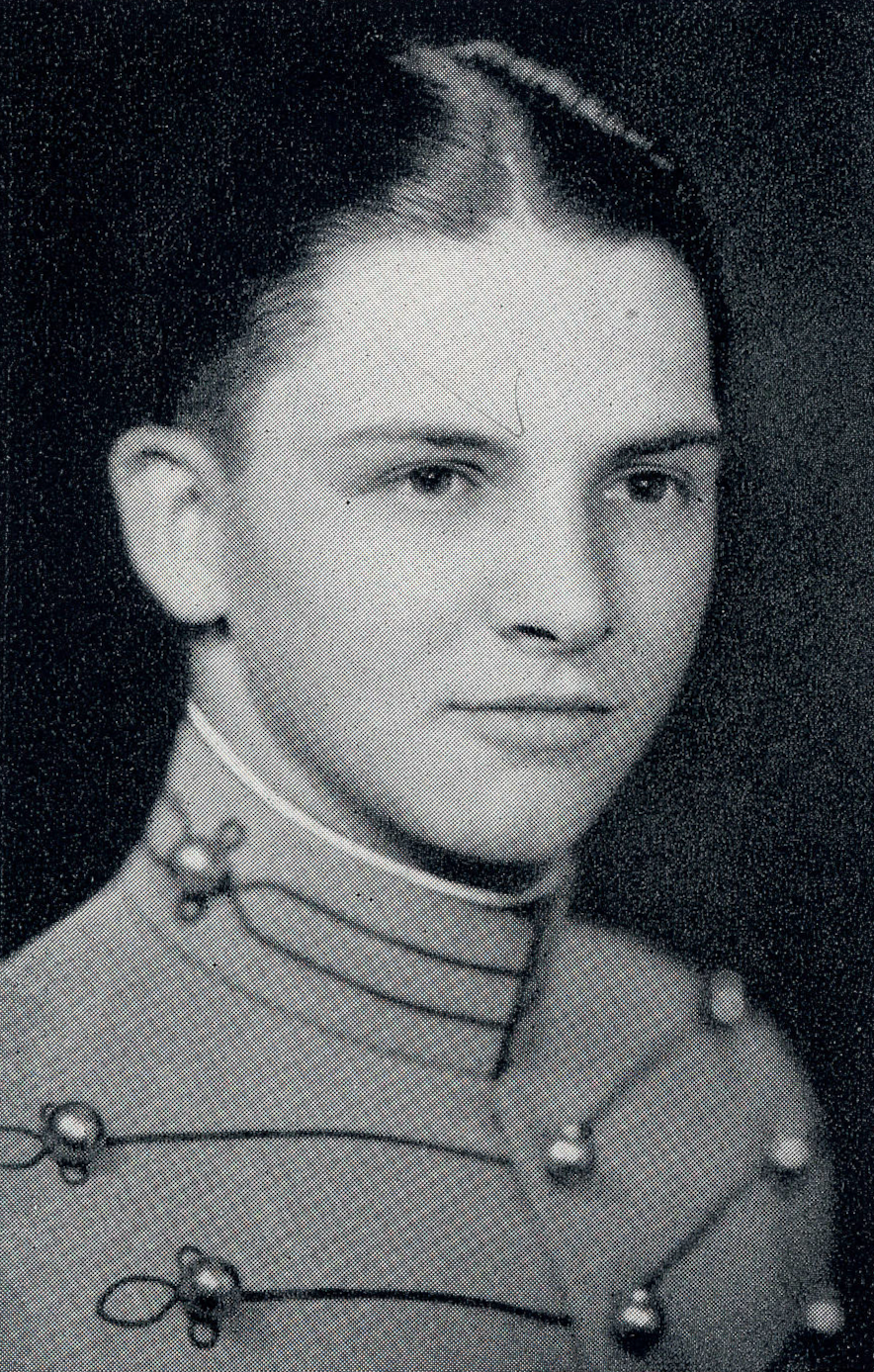
Stilwell Jr. as a United States Military Academy cadet c. 1933

Stilwell was born in Syracuse, New York, one of five children of General Joseph Stilwell. He attended West Point, graduating in the class of 1933. Stilwell later graduated from the Army and Navy Staff College in 1945 and the United States Army War College in 1951.

== Military career ==
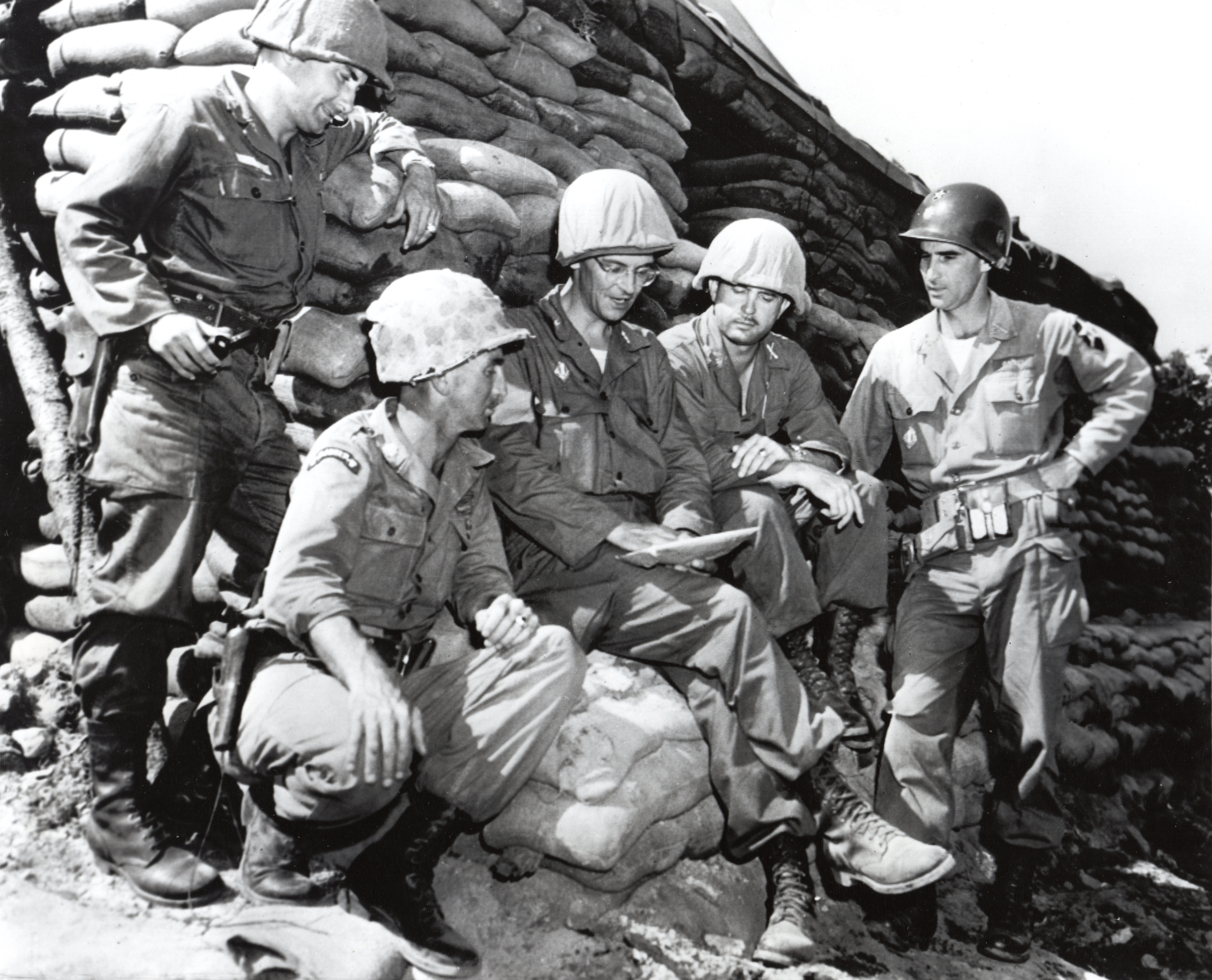
Stilwell (center) and his staff while in command of the 23rd Infantry Regiment c. August 1952. Maj. Mark M. Boatner III, Regimental S-2, is on the far left.

Stilwell served as a lieutenant with the 15th Infantry Regiment (United States) in China in 1937. During a troop movement from Qinhuangdao to Tianjin on July 29, 1937, Stilwell's unit came into contact with a battle between Chinese and Japanese forces. Major William F. Lee, First Lieutenant Stilwell and four of their men each received the Soldier's Medal for protecting the unit and its equipment from injury and damage.

During World War II, Stilwell served in the China Burma India Theater, earning his first awards of the Legion of Merit and the Air Medal.

Stilwell served as commander of the 23rd Infantry Regiment, 2nd Infantry Division in Korea from 1952 to 1953, earning his second award of the Legion of Merit and first award of the Bronze Star Medal.

Stilwell served as commander of United States Army Support Group, Vietnam (renamed United States Army Support Command, Vietnam from March 1, 1964) from August 26, 1962, until June 30, 1964.

== Death ==
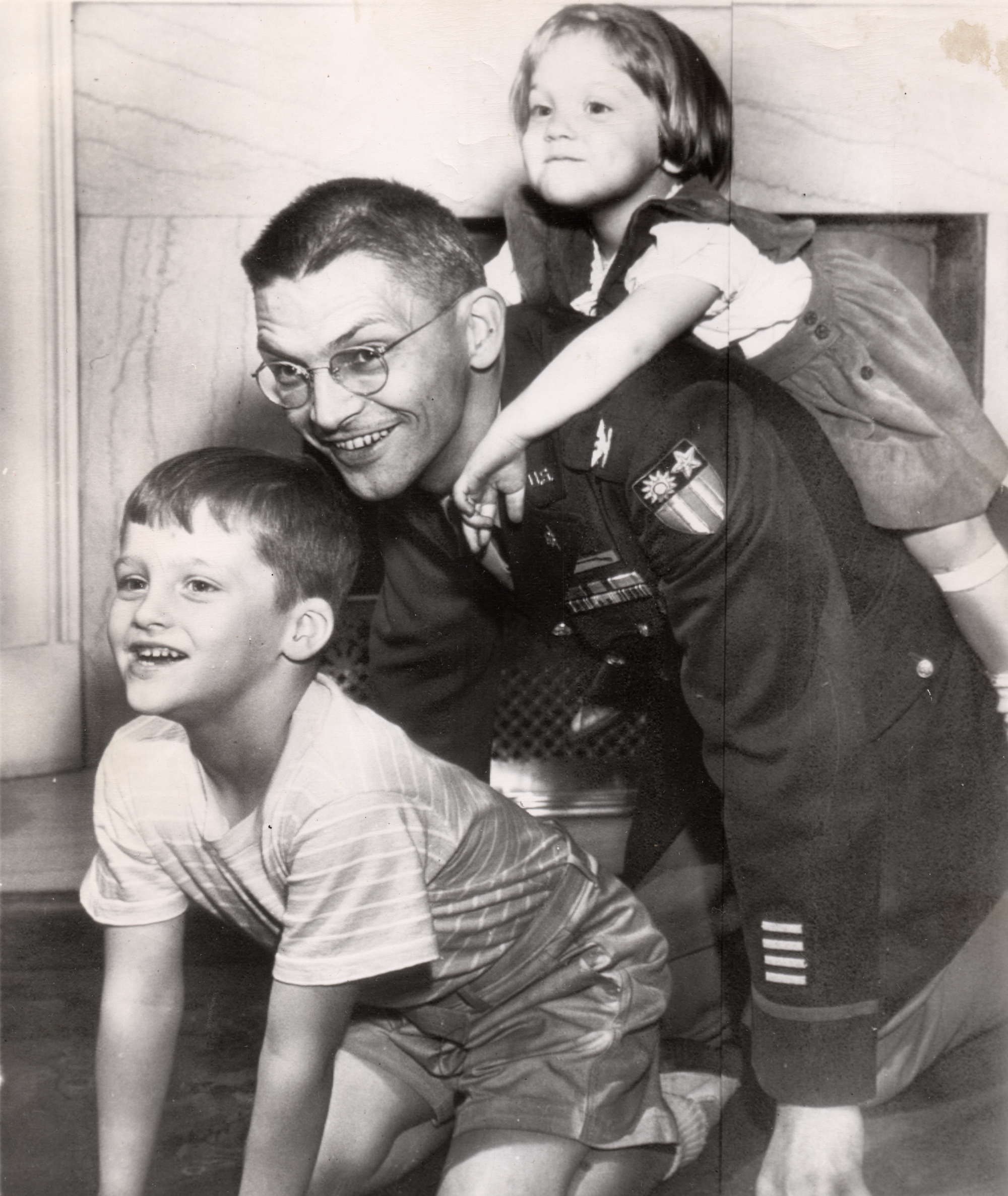
Stilwell reunites with children Joe III and "Kiki" after returning from China c. 1945

Stilwell was lost at sea on July 25, 1966, when flying a C-47 to Hawaii with longtime friend and pilot Hal Grimes of Air Ferry International. Harold Fossum was the navigator. The C-47 was to continue on to Thailand; however, Stilwell was only intending to travel as far as Hawaii to increase his instrument rating qualification. The Coast Guard, USAF and US Navy (including three destroyers and the USS Yorktown) searched an area of 105,000 square miles (270,000 km^{2}) without finding any trace of the aircraft. A memorial to Brig. Gen. Stilwell was erected at the West Point Cemetery next to the gravesite of his parents.

== Awards and decorations ==
Distinguished Service Medal
Legion of Merit with one Oak Leaf Cluster
Distinguished Flying Cross
Soldier's Medal
Bronze Star Medal with 3 Oak Leaf Clusters and Valor device
Purple Heart with one Oak Leaf Cluster
Air Medal with award numeral 26
Presidential Unit Citation
Republic of Korea Presidential Unit Citation with one Oak Leaf Cluster
China Service Medal
American Defense Service Medal
Asiatic-Pacific Campaign Medal
World War II Victory Medal
National Defense Service Medal
Korean Service Medal
Vietnam Service Medal
United Nations Korea Medal
Vietnam Campaign Medal
Combat Infantryman Badge
Master Parachutist Badge
