= Paul L. Freeman Jr. =

United States Army general

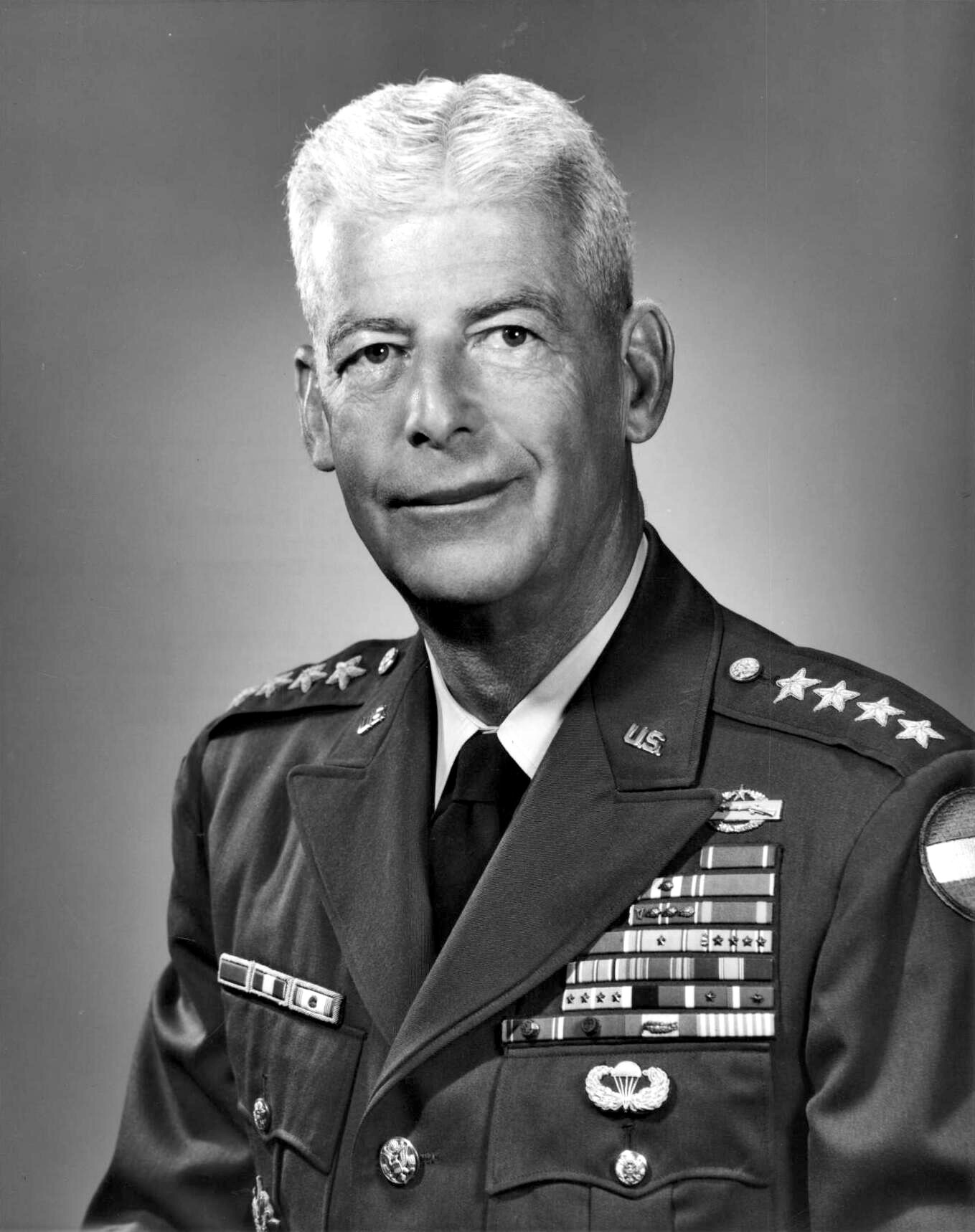
- General Paul L. Freeman Jr.
- Born: 29 June 1907; Philippines
- Died: 17 April 1988 (aged 80); Monterey California, U.S.
- Military career
- Allegiance: United States
- Branch: United States Army
- Service years: 1929–1967
- Rank: General
- Commands: United States Army Europe; Continental Army Command; 4th Infantry Division; 2nd Infantry Division; 23rd Infantry Regiment
- Conflicts: World War II; Korean War; Vietnam War
- Awards: Distinguished Service Cross; Army Distinguished Service Medal; Silver Star (2); Legion of Merit; Bronze Star Medal "V" device (4); Air Medal; Purple Heart

Paul Lamar Freeman Jr. (29 June 1907 – 17 April 1988) was a United States Army four-star general who served as Commander in Chief, United States Army Europe/Commander, Central Army Group from 1962 to 1965 and Commanding General, Continental Army Command from 1965 to 1967.

== Military career ==
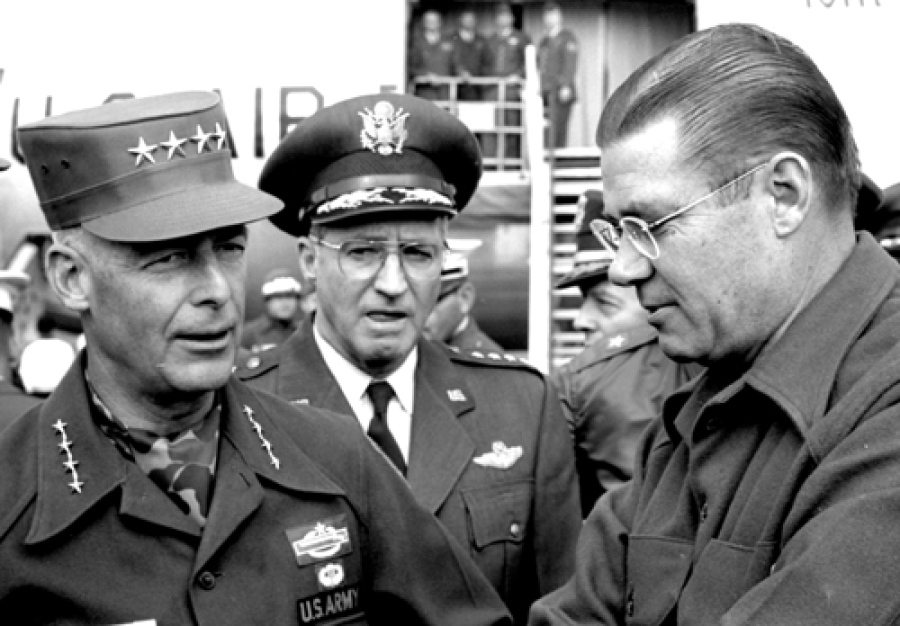
General Paul L. Freeman Jr. welcomed U.S. Secretary of Defense Robert McNamara and U.S. Air Force Chief of Staff General John P. McConnell during Freeman tenure as Commanding General, United States Army Europe, at Rhein-Main Air Force Base in Frankfurt, Germany, 7 March 1965

Freeman was born 29 June 1907, in the Philippine Islands, son of Paul Lamar and Emma (Rosenbaum) Freeman. He graduated from the United States Military Academy on 13 June 1929, with a class ranking of 213 and commissioned in the infantry. His first assignment was at Fort Sam Houston with the 9th Infantry Regiment. While in Texas, he married Mary Ann Fishburn on 18 August 1932, and had one daughter. A month after getting married, he reported to Fort Benning to attend the Officer's Course at the Infantry School, then was assigned to Tianjin (then called Tientsin) in China with the 15th Infantry Regiment until 1936. Upon his return to the United States he was assigned to Fort Washington, Maryland and was a company commander in the 12th Infantry Regiment, and subsequently returned to Fort Benning for the Tank Course. He then spent a year as company and battalion Maintenance Officer with the 66th Infantry Regiment.

As commanding general of Continental Army Command (second from left), inspecting Cam Ranh Bay Supply Depot, 1967

At the time of the United States entry into World War II, Freeman was in China again, in Beijing as a language student and concurrently as Assistant Military Attaché at the American embassy. Shortly after the attack on Pearl Harbor, he was assigned to the United States Military Mission to China, and a few months later reassigned to the staff of the China India Burma Theater as an instructor to Chinese and Indian Armies. He remained on the theater staff until September 1943, when he returned to Washington D.C., as a staff officer. Towards the end of the war in late 1944, he was sent to Rio de Janeiro, Brazil as Director of Arms Training for the Joint Brazil-United States Military Commission, a position he held until October 1947. He returned to the Army General Staff in Washington D.C., working in the Latin American Branch of the Plans and Operating Division, then from 1948 to 1950, served as a member of the Joint Brazil-United States Military Commission, and was also a member of the United States Army delegation to the Inter-American Defense Board.

With the outbreak of the Korean War, Freeman was deployed to that theater as the Commander of the 23rd Infantry Regiment in the 2nd Infantry Division. He led the regiment in the retreat from Kunu-ri in November 1950. In early February he led the 23rd Regimental Combat Team in the Battle of the Twin Tunnels on 1 February 1951 and then at Battle of Chipyong-ni from 13 to 15 February 1951. At Chipyong-ni the 23rd RCT was cut off and surrounded by elements of five Chinese divisions, which launched fanatical all-out assaults against them. He was wounded on the first night of the engagement by mortar shrapnel in his left calf. Although he expected to return to the 23rd Infantry Regiment after his wounds healed, he did not resume command of the regiment, having been returned to the US to recover.

Returning from the war, he attended the National War College, graduating in 1952. In 1955, he assumed command of the 2nd Infantry Division, and in 1956 took command of the 4th Infantry Division, at that time stationed at Fort Lewis, Washington. After his second division command ended in 1957, he served as Senior Army Member to the Weapons System Evaluation Group in Washington D.C. He was named Deputy Commanding General for Reserve Forces (CONARC) in 1960. On 1 May 1962 he received his fourth star, and assumed duties as Commander in Chief, United States Army Europe/Commander, Central Army Group, serving in that capacity until 1965. His final assignment was Commanding General, United States Continental Army Command from 1965 to 1967.

Freeman retired from the army in 1967, and died in Monterey California on 17 April 1988.

== Awards and decorations ==
Badges

- Combat Infantryman Badge with second award
- Parachutist Badge
- Army Staff Identification Badge

Decorations

- Distinguished Service Cross
- Army Distinguished Service Medal
- Silver Star with one oak leaf cluster
- Legion of Merit
- Bronze Star Medal with three oak leaf clusters and "V" device
- Air Medal
- Purple Heart

Service Medals

- American Defense Service Medal with star
- American Campaign Medal
- Asiatic-Pacific Campaign Medal with four campaign stars and arrowhead device
- World War II Victory Medal
- Army of Occupation Medal
- National Defense Service Medal with star
- Korean Service Medal with four campaign stars

Foreign Awards

- Brazilian Order of Military Merit (Ordem do Mérito Militar)
- French Legion of Honor in degree of commander
- French Croix de Guerre with palm
- Philippine Liberation Medal with two stars
- United Nations Korea Medal

Unit Awards

- Army Presidential Unit Citation
- Presidential Unit Citation (Philippines)
- Republic of Korea Presidential Unit Citation

Military offices
Preceded by Bruce C. Clarke	Commanding General of United States Army Europe; 1 May 1962 to 18 March 1965	Succeeded by Andrew P. O'Meara
