= 23rd Infantry Regiment (United States) =

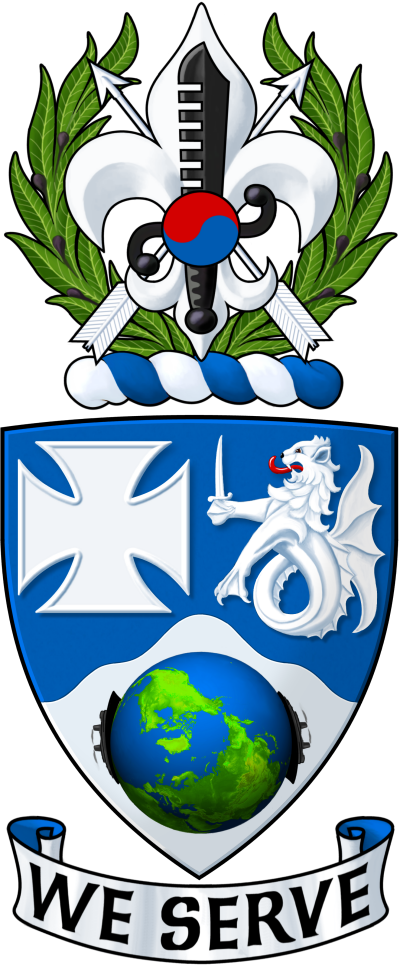
- 23rd Infantry Regiment's coat of arms
- Founded: 1861
- Country: United States
- Branch: Army
- Type: Infantry
- Garrison/HQ: Fort Carson, Colorado; Fort Lewis, Washington
- Nickname: "Tomahawks"
- Motto: We Serve
- Engagements: American Civil War; Indian Wars; Philippine–American War; World War I; World War II; Korean War; Vietnam War; Iraq War; US War in Afghanistan
- Decorations: Presidential Unit Citation (7); Croix de Guerre with Palm (3); Republic of Korea Presidential Unit Citation (3); Meritorious Unit Citation; Valorous Unit Citation; Cited in order of the day of Belgian Army; French Fourragere; Belgian Fourragere

Commanders
- Current commander: LTC(R) Frederick Drew (Regimental Colonel); LTC Jon V. Peterson (1st BN); LTC John Brasher (2nd BN); LTC Ryan A. McLaughlin
- Notable commanders: Jefferson C. Davis; Granville O. Haller; Henry M. Black; Samuel Ovenshine; George Whitefield Davis; Roscoe B. Woodruff; Frank T. Mildren; Edwin B. Howard; Edwin J. Messinger; Paul L. Freeman Jr.; Pete Dawkins; Bernard W. Rogers; Paul B. Malone; Guy H. Preston; Joseph W. Stilwell Jr.; Jack Keane (4th BN)

Insignia
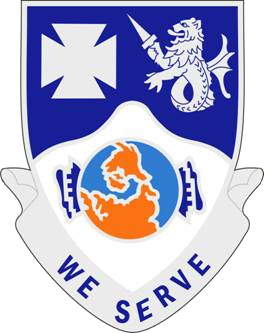
- Distinctive unit insignia

The 23rd Infantry Regiment is an infantry regiment in the United States Army. A unit with the same name was formed on 26 June 1812 and saw action in 14 battles during the War of 1812.

In 1815 it was consolidated with the 6th, 16th, 22nd, and 32nd Regiments of Infantry into what is at present the 2nd Infantry Regiment.

The modern 23rd Infantry regiment was formed during the American Civil War. The regiment saw action in wars up to the War in Afghanistan and the Iraq War. It included a battalion of volunteers made up of active and reserve French military personnel who had been sent to the Korean Peninsula as part of the United Nations force fighting in the Korean War.

== War of 1812 ==
Twenty-five regiments of infantry were approved by Act of Congress on June 26, 1812. After the war in 1815, the 23rd was consolidated with the 6th, 16th, 22nd, and 32nd Regiments of Infantry into what is at present the 2nd Infantry Regiment which inherited its honors. The 23rd Infantry Regiment utilized Buckshot n' round ball ammunition as their standard issue as well other infantry.

By reckoning at the time, there were 14 battles and engagements in which a part or the whole of the 23rd Infantry was engaged during the War of 1812-15, which amounts to most of the battles of the Niagara Frontier Campaign. In particular, these include Queenston Heights on October 13, 1812; Black Rock, November 28, 1812; Fort George in Upper Canada, May 27, 1813; Defense of Sacketts Harbor, N. Y., 1813; Stony Creek, Upper Canada, June 6, 1813; Beaver Dams, Upper Canada, June 24, 1813; Fort Erie, Upper Canada, July 3, 1814; Chippewa, Upper Canada, July 5, 1814; Lundy's Lane (Niagara Falls), July 25, 1814; Siege of Fort Erie, Upper Canada, August 15 to September 17, 1814.

== Korean War ==
=== Battle of Pusan Perimeter (4 August - 18 September 1950) ===
On June 25, 1950, the North Korean army invaded South Korea, beginning of the Korean War. By August 1950, the 23rd Infantry Regiment had deployed at the narrow valley called "Bowling Alley", which was near the city of Taegu in defense on the Pusan Perimeter and aid the South Korean troops in the battle.

=== Battle of Chipyong-ni (13-15 February 1951) ===
Chipyong-ni was defended because the commanding general of Eighth Army (Lieutenant General Matthew B. Ridgway) decided to make a stand there against the Chinese Communists.

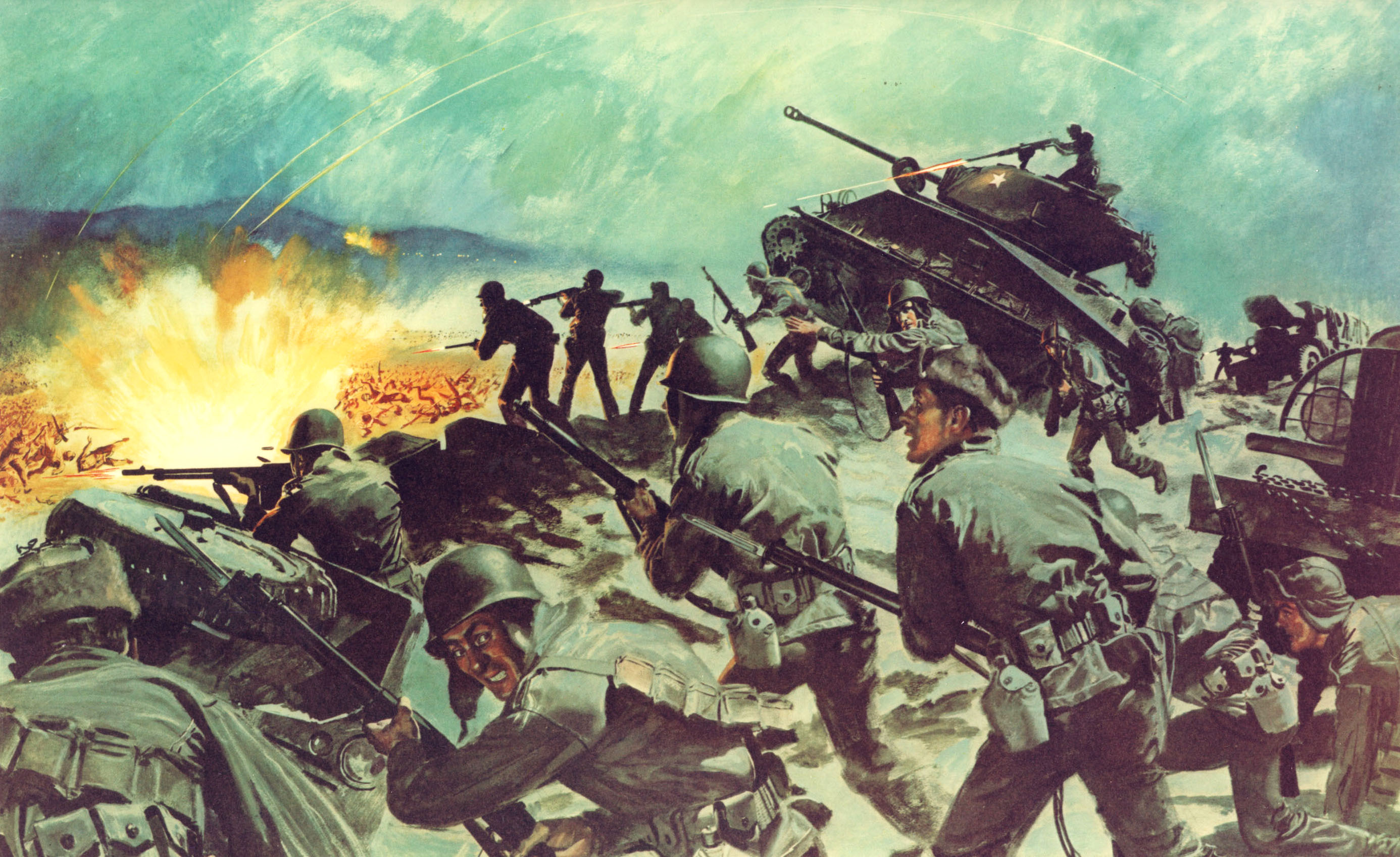
U.S. Army In Action DA Poster 21-47 Breakthrough at Chipyong-Ni

In the chronology of Korean battles, the fighting for Chipyong-ni followed the withdrawal from northern Korea at the end of 1950, a brief Eighth Army offensive that began on 5 February 1951, and a full-scale Chinese counteroffensive that struck a week later.

The 23rd Regimental Combat Team made the decisive defense of Chipyong-ni on 13–14 February 1951. This action followed the patrol ambush and the subsequent Battle of the Twin Tunnels area some high ground three miles southeast of Chipyong-ni. After the Twin Tunnels operation, the 23rd Infantry Regiment (2nd Infantry Division) proceeded on the afternoon of 3 February to the town of Chipyong-ni and set up a perimeter defense. Chipyong-ni was a small crossroads town half a mile long and several blocks wide, situated on a single-track railroad. Besides the railway station there were several other brick or frame buildings in the center of the town, but most of the buildings were constructed of the usual mud, sticks, and straw. At least half of them were already reduced to rubble as the result of previous fighting in the town.

Encircling Chipyong-ni were eight prominent hills that rose to an average height of 850 feet above the rice paddies and buildings in the valley. These hills provided excellent defensive positions, but to have occupied them would have stretched the front-line defensive positions along 12 miles of ridgelines and formed a perimeter with a 3 to 4-mile diameter. Instead, the regimental commander (Colonel Paul L. Freeman), stationed his infantrymen on lower ground around a tight perimeter about a mile in diameter. On three sides of the town the line followed small hills; on the northwest section the infantrymen dug their holes across a half-mile strip of rice paddies.

During the ten days after going into position at Chipyong-ni, Col. Freeman's regiment dug in and strengthened its positions. The 37th Field Artillery Battalion (attached to the regiment), arrived on 5 February. Battery B, 82nd Antiaircraft Artillery Automatic Weapons Battalion, joined the regiment, adding six M16 Half-Tracks and four M19 Multiple Gun Motor Carriages to the defense of the town. Several days later Battery B, 503rd Field Artillery Battalion (a 155-mm howitzer unit), was attached to reinforce the 37th Field Artillery Battalion.

The infantry companies dug in their machine guns, registered their mortars, laid antipersonnel mines, and operated daily patrols to the encompassing high ground. The regimental Heavy-Mortar Company divided the fire of its platoons and sections among the sectors of the perimeter, the artillery registered on all probable avenues of enemy approach and all units established good communication lines. There was time to coordinate the infantry, artillery and air support into an effective combat team.

==== Company G ====
The following narrative describes the fighting for Chipyong-ni that occurred in that sector of the 2nd Battalion's perimeter defended by Company G, 23rd Infantry. The howitzers of Battery B, 503rd Field Artillery Battalion, were in position at the bottom of Company G's hill so that the artillerymen were drawn into the same battle. The commander of the 2nd Battalion (Lt.Col. James W. Edwards) placed all three of his rifle companies on the front line to cover the sector assigned to his battalion. This was the southern rim of the perimeter. Within the companies, two company commanders committed their three rifle platoons. The other company (F), to which Col. Edwards assigned the center and smallest sector, manned its part of the line with only two platoons, leaving its support platoon as the battalion reserve.

The narrow supply road leading southwest from Chipyong-ni went under the railroad on the southern edge of the town and then, within a third of a mile, passed two embankments of red clay where the road cut through the two ends of a U-shaped hill. Company G started at the second of these two road cuts and extended left (east) along the southern side of the U. It was not much of a hill, only a couple of contour lines on the map. Infantrymen could climb the smooth hump of earth in a few minutes. The 1st Platoon of Company G held the right end of the hill next to the road cut. The 3rd Platoon had the center position (the highest part of the hill) and extended its line left to the bend of the U. The 2nd Platoon was down in the rice paddies between the 3rd Platoon and Company F.

Men from the two platoons on the hill dug their holes just over the top of the forward slope. The positions restricted the fields of fire somewhat but provided good observation, especially for the 3rd Platoon, which could see all areas to the south except for a dead spot in a dry creek bed just in front of its right flank.

There were two other significant features near the 3d Platoon's area. At the foot of the hill and just beyond the dry creek bed was a cluster of 15 or 20 buildings that made up the village of Masan. The second feature was a narrow spur of ground that formed a link between the 3rd Platoon's hill and a large hill mass to the south. The 2nd Platoon in the rice paddies lacked satisfactory observation but had good fields of fire across the flat land to its immediate front.

In addition to its own Weapons Platoon, Company G's supporting weapons included a section of 75-mm recoilless rifles, a section of heavy machine guns from Company H, and a platoon of 81-mm mortars under command of Lt. James Whitaker which was dug in near the edge of the town and had a forward observer (Lt.Whitaker) stationed with Company G. There were also forward observers from the regimental Heavy-Mortar Company and from the 37th Field Artillery Battalion with Company G. During the daytime men from the 75-mm recoilless rifle section manned their weapons, but at night they replaced them with two .50 caliber machine guns to prevent having their positions disclosed by the back-blasts of the recoilless rifles.

The Ammunition and Pioneer Platoon set up two fougasses (drums of napalm), the first on the road just south of the road cut, the second in the rice paddies in front of the 2nd Platoon. The 1st Platoon, which was next to the road, also strung barbed wire across the road and in front of its position. There was not enough wire available to reach across the company front. Colonel Edwards supervised the siting of all weapons, and the digging of the holes which he insisted be of the standing type and deep enough for good cover.

When Battery B, 503rd Field Artillery Battalion, arrived, its 155-mm howitzers went into position in the small bowl formed by the U-shaped ridge of which Company G occupied one side. The howitzers were laid by platoon to support the east, north and west sectors of the regimental perimeter. To the rear of the howitzers, the artillerymen set up a tent for the fire direction center (FDC) personnel. Behind that, near the bottom of Company G's hill, were several other tents for the mess and supply sections. A liaison officer from the 37th Field Artillery Battalion to Battery B (Captain John A. Elledge), and the commander of Company G (Lieutenant Thomas Heath) worked out a plan for the joint defense of the sector. This plan provided for the use of the artillery's machine guns in the front line and, if necessary, the use of some artillerymen as riflemen while skeleton crews manned the howitzers. The two officers also set up an infantry-artillery machine-gun post in the road cut with a six-man crew to operate two weapons, one .50 caliber and one .30 caliber. This road cut was also the dividing line between Col. Edwards's 2nd Battalion sector and that of the French battalion (a regular battalion of the 23rd Infantry).

==== Offensive and counter-offensive ====
While the 23rd RCT built up its defenses, an Eighth Army general offensive got under way on 5 February with X Corps, in the center of the line, attacking to make a double envelopment of the town of Hongch'on, an important enemy build-up area. The attack moved slowly until the night of 11 February, when the Chinese launched a full-scale counteroffensive with two columns driving south, aimed at the towns of Hoengseong and Wonju in X Corps' sector. The vigorous enemy attack drove through two ROK divisions and turned the United Nations' attack into a withdrawal that rolled the front lines south between 5 and 20 miles. Before the Chinese attack, the front lines of X Corps were well ahead of Col. Freeman's Chipyong-ni perimeter, but as the units went south, sometimes fighting through enemy roadblocks, Chipyong-ni became a conspicuous bulge on the left of the corps' line. Eventually the bulge was cut off from X Corps and the 23rd was completely surrounded.

Day 1 of the battle

At the 23rd Infantry's perimeter, the usual patrols for the daylight hours of 13 February reported increased enemy activity crowding close to Chipyong-ni on three sides, north, east and west. The Air Force observation plane operating with the RCT reported enemy groups moving toward the perimeter from the north and east. Observers called for artillery fire against those enemy columns within reach, while the tactical air control party directed forty flights of aircraft against other enemy groups beyond artillery range. Beginning about 22:00, the Chinese launched a series of probes and attacks designed to locate and drive the 23rd Infantry out of their defensive positions. These ceased shortly after sunrise due to the threat of American air control.

Day 2 of the battle

The Americans were low on ammunition by the second day in addition to having suffered about 100 casualties. Air support kept the Chinese from attacking during daylight hours on the 14th. At dusk the Chinese resumed their artillery attack followed shortly afterward by ground attacks. A fierce prolonged battle ensued with the forces on the south side being forced out of position. The battle on the south side continued all day on the 15th even in the face of American close air support. The Chinese were determined to destroy the 23rd to allow them to continue to force the X Corps south. Late in the afternoon, the Chinese were forced back outside of the defensive positions. Elements of the 5th Cavalry Regiment (Task Force Crombez) with tank support arrived as the fight was ending with the Chinese withdrawing.

Aftermath

The Chinese failure to eliminate the 23rd at Chipyong-ni effectively ended the Chinese effort to drive the American forces into the sea. UN casualties were 51 killed, 250 wounded, and 42 missing. The Chinese had lost about 2,000 killed and suffered about 3,000 wounded. The effect on the Eighth Army was tremendous. Shortly afterward the UN launched Operation Killer and then Operation Ripper which forced the Chinese back to the north. The result was the start of peace negotiations in July 1951.

=== Heartbreak Ridge (13 September - 15 October 1951) ===
After withdrawing from Bloody Ridge, the Korean People's Army (KPA) set up new positions just 1,500 yards (1,400 m) away on a seven-mile (11 km) long hill mass. If anything, the Communist defenses were even more formidable here than on Bloody Ridge. The U.S. 2nd Infantry Division's acting commander, Brigadier General Thomas de Shazo and his immediate superior, Major General Clovis E. Byers, the X Corps commander, seriously underestimated the strength of the North Korean position. They ordered a single infantry regiment—the 23rd—and its attached French battalion to make what would prove to be an ill-conceived assault straight up Heartbreak's heavily fortified slopes.

All three of the 2nd Division's infantry regiments participated, with the brunt of the combat borne by the 23rd and 9th Infantry Regiments, along with the attached French battalion. The attack began on 13 September and quickly deteriorated into a familiar pattern. First, American aircraft, tanks and artillery would pummel the ridge for hours, turning the already barren hillside into a cratered moonscape. Next, the 23rd's infantrymen would clamber up the mountain's rocky slopes, taking out one enemy bunker after another by direct assault. Those who survived to reach the crest arrived exhausted and low on ammunition. The North Koreans counterattacked repeatedly. Many of these counterattacks were conducted at night by fresh troops that the North Koreans were able to bring up in the shelter of neighboring hills.

The battle progressed for two weeks. Because of the constricting terrain and the narrow confines of the objectives, units were committed piecemeal to the fray, one platoon, company, or battalion at a time. Once a particular element had been so ground-up that it could no longer stand the strain, a fresh unit would take its place, until the 23rd Infantry as a whole was fairly well shattered.

The fighting was savage, and the ridgeline (called Heartbreak by the American infantrymen) changed hands many times in an exhausting series of attacks and counterattacks. Several units up to company size (100-200 men) were wiped out. The Americans employed massive artillery barrages, airstrikes and tanks in an attempt to drive the North Koreans off the ridge, but the KPA proved extremely hard to dislodge.

Finally, on 27 September, the 2nd Division's new commander, Major General Robert N. Young, called a halt to the "fiasco" on Heartbreak Ridge as American planners reconsidered their strategy.

As long as the North Koreans could continue to reinforce and resupply their garrison on the ridge, it would be nearly impossible for the Americans to take and hold the mountain. After belatedly recognizing this fact, the 2nd Division crafted a new plan that called for a full divisional assault on the valleys and hills adjacent to Heartbreak Ridge to cut the position off from further reinforcement. Spearheading this new offensive was the division's 72nd Tank Battalion, whose mission was to push up the Mundung-ni Valley west of Heartbreak Ridge, destroying enemy supply dumps in the vicinity of the town of Mundung-ni.

It was a bold plan, but one that could not be accomplished until a way had been found to get the 72nd's M4A3E8 Sherman tanks into the valley. The only existing road was little more than a track that could not bear the weight of the Shermans. Moreover, it was heavily mined and blocked by a six-foot (2 m) high rock barrier built by the North Koreans. The 2nd Division's 2nd Combat Engineer Battalion braved enemy fire to clear this obstacle and build an improved roadway. While they worked, the division's three infantry regiments—9th, 38th and 23rd—launched coordinated assaults on Heartbreak Ridge and the adjacent hills. On 10 October the sudden onslaught of a battalion of tanks racing up the valley took the enemy by surprise. By coincidence, the thrust came just when the Chinese 204th Division was moving up to relieve the North Koreans on Heartbreak Ridge. Caught in the open, the Chinese division suffered heavy casualties from the American tanks. For the next five days the Shermans roared up and down the Mundung-ni Valley, over-running supply dumps, mauling troop concentrations and destroying approximately 350 bunkers on Heartbreak Ridge and in the surrounding hills and valleys. A smaller tank-infantry team scoured the Sat'ae-ri Valley east of the ridge, thereby completing the encirclement and eliminating any hope of reinforcement for the North Koreans on Heartbreak.

The armored thrusts turned the tide of the battle, but hard fighting remained for the infantry before French soldiers captured the last communist bastion on the ridge on 13 October. After 30 days of combat, the Americans and French eventually secured Heartbreak Ridge.

Both sides suffered high casualties: over 3,700 American and French and an estimated 25,000 North Korean and Chinese. The U.N. and U.S. command, which decided that battles like Heartbreak Ridge were not worth the high cost in blood for the relatively small amount of terrain captured. For this reason, Heartbreak Ridge was the last major offensive conducted by U.N. forces in the war.

Sporadic battles along the line of contact between U.N. and communist forces continued to be fought until the armistice was signed in July 1953, but they were usually initiated by the North Koreans or Chinese.

== Re-designation of 1st Battalion, 23rd Infantry Regiment ==
The unit derived from the 4th Battalion, 8th Infantry Regiment, 1st Armored Division, which served in Mannheim, Germany until the unit was sent, along with the rest of the brigade, to Fort Lewis, Washington, in the summer of 1994. That fall, the battalion was reflagged as the 1st Battalion, 23rd Infantry Regiment, 2nd Infantry Division.

== Operation Iraqi Freedom ==
In October 2003, as a part of 3-2 SBCT 1st Bn 23rd Infantry deployed from Fort Lewis to Kuwait and then to Iraq as part Operation Iraqi Freedom in the First Stryker Brigade. 1-23IN Deployed to FOB Pacesetter after one month of training in Kuwait. The Battalion moved via ground to FOB Pacesetter under 4th Infantry Division where they conducted operations in Ad Deluiyah. On 8 December B Co 1-23IN lost SPC Blickenstaff, SPC Wesley and SSG Bridges in a vehicle rollover on their first mission. The unit continued operations through the month of December as part of Operation Ivy Blizzard. The Tomahawk Battalion then moved to Mosul, Iraq where the battalion conducted a relief in place with units from the 101st Airborne Division (Air Assault). 1-23IN occupied combat outpost on the western side of the Tigris River and conducted numerous combat operations to attempt to remove the insurgent threat in the Nineveh Province. The Battalion conducted numerous raids, traffic control points and neighborhood engagements to remove insurgents from the city. All the while having the units history being chronicled by Colby Buzzell. Most notably the attack on 4 August 2004. Where the entire battalion repelled and attack from a large coordinated citywide attack from insurgents.

== Operation Enduring Freedom ==
=== Deployment and elections ===
Starting on 9 July 2009, 5-2 SBCT deployed from Fort Lewis, Washington to Kandahar Airfield, Afghanistan in support of Operation Enduring Freedom. After completing equipment preparation and troop-leading procedures, the battalion conducted a tactical road march to FOB (Forward Operating Base) Wolverine in Zabul Province on 5–6 August. Company A moved south of the Sur Ghar Mountains to FOB Sweeney, an outpost that was occupied by a US Army SF ODA and Afghan National Army soldiers. They quickly settled into the area around the village of Shinkay and began counter-insurgency (COIN) operations. The next element to move out from Wolverine was Company C, which conducted a road march through Qalat to Shajoy, the second largest city in Zabul Province. Here they began the establishment of a company combat outpost that would be known as "Sangar", as well as the inception of COIN operations designed to provide security to the populace. Company B remained at FOB Wolverine with the battalion headquarters, and began conducting operations in Surri, a subdistrict of Shinkay.

Upon their arrival into sector, the battalion partnered with the Afghan National Army and Police Afghan National Security Forces (ANSF) and prepared for the Afghan National Election. Battalion personnel provided security at several polling stations in Zabul Province in order to ensure that the election was free and fair. The voting occurred without incident, much to the credit of the Soldiers and ANSF who worked to ensure that the Taliban could not intimidate voters. There was limited enemy contact throughout Ramadan, with the exception of Company C, who experienced a suicide attack in the Shajoy Bazaar which wounded 15 US soldiers and one interpreter. The first battalion mission planned was Operation 'Longview', which encompassed multiple clearing operations in Zabul Province; it was aimed at keeping the enemy from establishing a firm foothold in several key locations. Once Ramadan ended, the enemy became more aggressive, especially in Surri. Company B met the enemy several times in "the football", the area between Route Duck and Route Bull, this incident included the second in command of Taliban fighters in Zabul Province, Mohammad Khan. Khan set an ambush near the village of Mado, but was wounded in the fight and forced to flee. Intelligence reports later confirmed that Mohammad Khan had been killed in the engagement. The Taliban sought vengeance for their loss, and stepped up their attacks on coalition forces. On 24 September, members of Company B initiated a pressure plate improvised explosive device (IED) near the town of Omar Zai, killing three US soldiers and wounding three others. This incident led the battalion to adopt a more enemy-focused mission, and was the impetus behind Operation 'Laconia', the clearing of Omar Zai, Gazak Kalay, Bowlan Kalay, Patukheyl Kalay and Melizay Kalay. This operation, partnered with the ANA, led to the discovery of two IED caches and the disruption of the IED cell operating southwest of FOB Wolverine.

In October, as part of Operation 'Longview', Company A conducted Operation 'Treadstone': a partnered clearing of the Rowghani, Band Kalay, and Karim Khel areas north of Shinkay. Company C conducted Operation 'Chinehs': a battalion minus clearing of the Chinehs area north of Shajoy, known as the home of the shadow governor of Zabul. This mission yielded several IED caches, as well as the discovery of a madrassa where young men were trained to be suicide bombers. On November 4th Battalion's (4-23 IN's) sister battalion, its Battalion, 17th Infantry (1-17 IN), suffered the loss of seven soldiers in an IED strike in the Arghandab River Valley in Kandahar Province. This incident led to the brigade minus mission Operation 'Focus Hold', where B Company, 4th Battalion (B/4-23) was ordered to move from FOB Wolverine to COP Jelawar in the southern Arghandab in order to assist 1-17 IN. Company C continued building COP "Sangar" and conducting patrols in Shajoy, until 19 November when a VBIED (car bomb), struck the joint ECP of COP "Sangar" and FOB Bullard, killing two paratroopers from the 1st Battalion, 508th Parachute Infantry (1-508th PIR). This led to the reestablishment of Operation 'Las Cruces': the tightened control of Shajoy City that occurred between 20–24 November, as well as the arrival of engineers and materials for the improvement of force protection on the COP.

While 4-23 IN soldiers ate Thanksgiving dinner at their bases, RC South was preparing a FRAGO for 5/2 SBCT. On 6 December, the brigade received a change of mission to stop COIN operations and focus on securing freedom of movement on the highways of southern Afghanistan. As part of this, 4-23 IN was to move out of Zabul Province and occupy bases in Helmand Province, in order to provide security on Highways 1 and 601. The battalion commander gave the order to consolidate all units at FOB Wolverine and prepare for movement. Company A was the first element to leave Zabul, moving into FOB Ramrod in the Maiwand District of Kandahar Province, alongside 2nd Battalion, 1st Infantry (2-1 IN). Personnel began the area assessments of their new AO along HWY 601 from Durai Junction to Lashkar Gah. Company B was released from 1-17 IN on 28 December and moved to FOB Tombstone, from which they would begin operations along Highway 1 west of the city of Gereshk.

The battalion headquarters and Company C were last to move, occupying FOB Price, a joint Danish, British and American base outside the city of Gereshk, in Helmand Province. The expansion of FOB Price required a large-scale logistical move of building materials and life support equipment in order to establish the operations center, motor pool, ANA training academy, living areas, and security towers. FOB Price eventually grew to over twice its original size. Company C picked up its sector, responsible for Highway 1 between Gereshk and Durai Junction. Headquarters Company, which had previously owned battle space in Zabul, instead supervised the creation of the Mohawk Academy, which began the training of ANA soldiers in basic skills such as first aid and marksmanship.

=== Helmand Province ===
Upon arriving in Helmand Province, the battalion, partnered with 6/4/205 ANA and the Lashkar Gah ANP, executed Operation 'Helmand Sunrise', which focused on securing the highways by means of traffic control points, culvert denial emplacement, persistent surveillance, and training of the ANA and ANP along HWY 1 and HWY 601. During January, the 2nd Marine Expeditionary Brigade and RC South planned Operation Moshtarak, the clearing of the known Taliban stronghold in central Helmand Province known as Marjeh. 4-23 IN was chosen to participate in this operation. The battalion leadership met Marine commanders at FOB Dwyer as early as 20 January to plan for the clearing of Marjeh, specifically focusing on the battalion's role in clearing the Badula Qulp area along the Trekh Zabur Canal, which would be known as Operation 'Helmand Spider'. 5/2 SBCT would attach A/1-17 IN to 4-23 IN for the operation, while B/1-17 IN would occupy FOB Tombstone and pick up operations in the B/4-23 IN sector while they were participating in Operation 'Moshtarak', as a continued presence on the highways was deemed critical to mission success. Operation 'Helmand Spider' began on 8 February and lasted for 26 days. Task Force Mohawk, partnered with 1/1/205 ANA, cleared south along the Trekh Zabur Canal, conducting a link up with 3/6 Marines at the "5 points" intersection in southern Nad-e Ali District. Following this, A/1-17 IN and B/4-23 IN pushed west into northern Marjeh to conduct disruption operations, while the Reconnaissance Platoon conducted screening along the northern corridor in order to prevent the infiltration of Taliban reinforcements. Task Force Mohawk continued operations until 6 March, when they were relieved by elements of 3/6 Marines.

In the month-long operation, the task force had 15 enemy KIA, 9 enemy WIA, 23 IEDs found and cleared, 8 IED strikes, and 497 individuals enrolled in biometric systems. 4-23 IN and its supporting elements were recommended by Task Force Leatherneck for a Presidential Unit Citation for their actions in Marjeh. During February, several smaller company operations were conducted along HWY 601 and in the Yakhchal valley. Company A conducted Operation '601 Cougar', clearing north through Gavban in the southern Yakhchal, which yielded a great amount of intelligence about the enemy in the area. Company C conducted missions in Mohammad Karim Kalay, as well as Yakhchal, in order to disrupt enemy forces influencing HWY 1. Throughout the remainder of the deployment, 4-23 IN continued to provide freedom of movement along the highways, while simultaneously planning to hand over their vehicles and equipment to the 2nd Stryker Cavalry Regiment and hand over the Helmand battlespace to the 2nd Marine Expeditionary Brigade and the Danish battlegroup. The final battalion operation was the move back to Zabul Province in order to set up operations for the 2nd Stryker Cavalry Regiment to assume responsibility.

=== Return to U.S. ===
4-23 Infantry returned to Fort Lewis in July 2010 following its 12-month deployment. The battalion was part of the first Stryker unit to deploy to Afghanistan. 4-23 Infantry was the only Stryker battalion operating in the remote, mountainous terrain of Zabul Province, which required greater logistical coordination, maintenance, and care of equipment than any other unit. The battalion was the only infantry unit in Afghanistan to be tasked to move across two provinces and set up operations in an entirely new area. 4-23 Infantry was the only U.S. Army unit to take part in Operation 'Moshtarak', the largest offensive operation in Afghanistan since the war began in 2001. 4-23 Infantry was also the only U.S. Army infantry battalion operating in the volatile Helmand Province. 4-23 Infantry as part of 5th Stryker Brigade, 2nd Infantry Division was the second U.S. Army brigade to deploy with the Landwarrior system.

=== Afghanistan 2012 Deployment ===
4-23 Infantry deployed in April 2012 under the reflagged 2nd Stryker Brigade, known as the Lancers, 2nd Infantry Division to the Maiwand and Zharai District and returned to Joint Base Lewis-McChord in January 2013.

1-23 Infantry deployed in March 2012, 3rd Stryker brigade combat team, to Panjwai district, Kandahar province, Afghanistan. The Taliban proclaimed Panjwai as the birthplace of the Taliban movement in the early 1990s. 1-64 Armor deployed and was attached to 1-23 Infantry throughout their deployment. They returned to the United States in November 2012. Through the deployment, they suffered 3 casualties.

The battalion headquarters was in Zangabad, where Comanche company was also stationed out of.

== History ==
- Constituted 3 May 1861 in the Regular Army as the 1st Battalion, 14th Infantry
- Organized 8 July 1861 at Fort Trumbull, Connecticut
- Redesignated 30 April 1862 as the 2nd Battalion, 14th Infantry
- Reorganized and redesignated 21 September 1866 as the 23rd Infantry
- Assigned 22 September 1917 to the 2nd Division (later redesignated as the 2nd Infantry Division)
- Assigned 20 October 1954, to Fort Lewis, WA
- Assigned 1956, to Alaska
- Relieved 20 June 1957 from assignment to the 2nd Infantry Division and reorganized as a parent regiment under the Combat Arms Regimental System (CARS).
- Redesignated 20 June 1957 1st Battalion becomes Headquarters and Headquarters Company, 1st Battle Group, 23rd Infantry
- Redesignated 20 June 1957, Company 'D' becomes Headquarters and Headquarters Company, 4th Battle Group, 23rd Infantry (inactive)
- Redesignated 1963 Company F, 1st Battle Group, 23rd Infantry organized as Airborne infantry, earning nickname "Fearless Foxes"
- Redesignated 25 January 1963 1st Battle Group, 23rd Infantry becomes 1st Battalion, 23rd Infantry
- Assigned 25 January 1963 1st Battalion, 23rd Infantry to 2nd Infantry Division.
- Activated 25 January 1963 4th Battle Group, 23rd Infantry
- Assigned 25 January 1963 4th Battle Group, 23rd Infantry to 172nd Infantry Brigade
- Redesignated 1 July 1963 the 4th Battle Group, 23rd Infantry becomes 4th Battalion, 23rd Infantry
- Reflagged 1 July 1963 Co F (Abn) to Co (Abn), 4-23rd Infantry at Ft. Richardson, Alaska
- Transferred 1 July 1965, 1st Battalion, 23rd Infantry to South Korea
- Alerted 17 December 1965, the 4th Battalion (Mechanized), 23rd Infantry for overseas deployment
- Assigned 14 January 1966 4th Battalion, 23rd Infantry to 1st Brigade, 25th Infantry Division
- Activated 14 January 1966 5th Battalion, 23rd Infantry and assigned to 172nd Inf Bde (Separate)
- Embarked 15 April 1966 4th Battalion, 23rd Infantry on USS Walker
- Sailed 16 April 1966 USS Walker at 0200 With 4-23rd Infantry
- Arrived 29 April 1966 Vung Tau, and assigned to Chu Chi, Republic of Vietnam
- Inactivated 5 June 1972 4-23rd Infantry from 25th Infantry Division
- Reactivated 2 August 1972 4-23rd Infantry and reassigned to the 172nd Infantry Brigade in Alaska
- Inactivated 2 August 1972 5th Battalion, 23rd Infantry
- Inactivated 6 January 1983 4th Battalion, 23rd Infantry
- Reactivated 21 January 1983 4th Battalion, 23rd Infantry
- Assigned 21 January 1983 4th Battalion, 23rd Infantry to 9th Infantry Division (Motorized), Fort Lewis, WA
- Assigned 21 January 1983 2nd Battalion, 23rd Infantry to 9th Infantry Division (Motorized), Fort Lewis, WA
- Withdrawn 21 January 1983 All infantry from the Combat Arms Regimental System and reorganized under the United States Army Regimental System
- Inactivated on 16 December 1986 1st Battalion, 23rd Infantry, 2nd Brigade, 2nd Infantry Division, South Korea
- Inactivated 28 September 1990 4th Battalion, 23rd Infantry
- Inactivated 28 September 1990 2nd Battalion, 23rd Infantry relieved from assignment to the 9th Infantry Division
- Reactivated 16 April 1995 1st Battalion, 23rd Infantry
- Assigned 16 April 1995 1st Battalion, 23rd Infantry to Fort Lewis
- Reassigned 2003 1st Battalion, 23rd Infantry Fort Lewis, WA, and became part of the 3rd Brigade, 2nd Infantry Division, the first Stryker brigade
- Reactivated 16 March 2004 4th Battalion, 23d Infantry; reorganized as a Stryker battalion
- Assigned 16 March 2004 4th Battalion, 23rd Infantry to 172nd Infantry Brigade (Stryker)
- Inactivated 15 December 2006 4th Battalion (Stryker), 23rd Infantry
- Activated 16 April 2007 4th Battalion (Stryker), 23rd Infantry
- Assigned 16 April 2007 5th Brigade Combat Team (Stryker), 2nd Infantry Division
- 2003-2004 Served in OIF (1st Battalion with 3rd BCT, 2nd Inf Div)
- 2005-2006 Served in OIF (4th Battalion with 172d INF BDE)
- 2006-2007 Served in OIF (1st Battalion with 3rd BCT, 2nd Inf Div)
- 2007-2008 Served in OIF "Surge" (2nd Battalion with 4th BCT, 2nd Inf Div)
- 2009-2010 Served in OIF (1st Battalion with 3rd BCT, 2nd Inf Div)
- 2009-2010 Served in OIF (2nd Battalion with 4th BCT, 2d Inf Div)
- 2009-2010 Served in OEF (4th Battalion, 5th BCT, 2nd Inf Div later reassigned to the 2nd BCT, 2nd Inf Div)
- 2012-2013 Served in OEF (1st, 2nd, 4th Battalion with 2nd BCT, 2nd Inf Div, 3rd BCT, 2nd Inf Div, and 4th BCT, 2nd Inf Div)
- 2018-2019 Served in Operation Freedom's Sentinel (2nd Battalion with 1st SBCT, 4th Inf Div)

=== Current structure ===
- 1st Battalion, 1st SBCT, 2nd Infantry Division, Fort Lewis, Washington
- 2nd Battalion, 1st SBCT, 4th Infantry Division, Fort Carson, Colorado
- 4th Battalion, 2nd SBCT, 2nd Infantry Division, Fort Lewis, Washington

== Campaign participation credit ==
- American Civil War: Peninsula; Manassas; Antietam; Fredericksburg; Chancellorsville; Gettysburg; Wilderness; Spotsylvania; Cold Harbor; Petersburg; Virginia 1862; Virginia 1863
- Indian Wars: Little Big Horn; Arizona 1866; Idaho 1868;
- Spanish–American War: Manila
- Philippine–American War: Manila; Malolos; Mindanao; Jolo; Jolo 1903
- World War I: Aisne; Aisne-Marne; St. Mihiel; Meuse-Argonne; Ile de France 1918; Lorraine 1918
- World War II: Normandy; Northern France; Rhineland; Ardennes-Alsace; Central Europe
- Korean War: UN Defensive; UN Offensive; CCF Intervention; First UN Counteroffensive; CCF Spring Offensive; UN Summer-Fall Offensive; Second Korean Winter; Korea, Summer/Fall 1952; Third Korean Winter; Korea, Summer 1953
- Vietnam War: Counteroffensive; Counteroffensive, Phase II; Counteroffensive, Phase III; Tet Counteroffensive; Counteroffensive, Phase IV; Counteroffensive, Phase V; Counteroffensive, Phase VI; Tet 69/Counteroffensive; Summer/Fall 1969; Winter-Spring 1970; Sanctuary Counteroffensive; Counteroffensive, Phase VII
- Operation 'Iraqi Freedom', Nov 2003-Dec 2004 (1st Battalion): Samarra; Tal Afar; and Mosul; Al Kutt; Al Hayy; Al Suwaria; Yousifiah
- Operation 'Iraqi Freedom', Aug 2005-Dec 2006: (4th Battalion) Mosul; Rawah; Tal Afar; Baghdad
- Operation 'Iraqi Freedom', Jun 2006-Sep 2007: (1st Battalion): Baghdad "Arrowhead Ripper"; The Surge; Baqubah (Jun/Sep 2007)
- Operation 'Iraqi Freedom', Apr 2007-Jun 2008 (2nd Battalion): The Surge; Baghdad and Diyala Province
- Operation 'Iraqi Freedom', Jul 2009-Aug 2010 (1st Battalion): Drawdown; Diyala Province; Baqubah
- Operation 'Iraqi Freedom', Sep 2009-Sep 2010 (2nd Battalion): Drawdown; Baghdad; Al Taji;
- Operation 'Enduring Freedom': OEF 09-11 (4th Battalion)
- Operation 'Enduring Freedom': OEF 11-12 (1st Battalion)
- Operation 'Enduring Freedom': OEF 12-13 (4th Battalion)
- Operation 'Freedom's Sentinel', Apr 2018-Jan 2019 (2nd Battalion)

== Decorations ==
- Presidential Unit Citation (Army) for BREST, FRANCE
- Presidential Unit Citation (Army) for WIRTZFELD, BELGIUM
- Presidential Unit Citation (Army) for KRINKELTER WALD, BELGIUM
- Presidential Unit Citation (Army) for ST. VITH
- Presidential Unit Citation (Army) for TWIN TUNNELS
- Presidential Unit Citation (Army) for CHIPYONG-NI
- Presidential Unit Citation (Army) for HONGCHON
- Valorous Unit Award for SAIGON
- Valorous Unit Award for TAY NINH PROVINCE
- Republic of Vietnam Cross of Gallantry with Palm for VIETNAM 1966-1968 (4th battalion)
- Republic of Vietnam Cross of Gallantry with Palm for VIETNAM 1968-1970 (4th battalion)
- Republic of Vietnam Civil Action Honor Medal, First Class for VIETNAM 1966-1970 (4th battalion)
- French Croix de Guerre with Palm, World War I for CHATEAU THIERRY
- French Croix de Guerre with Palm, World War I for AISNE-MARNE
- French Croix de Guerre with Palm, World War I for MEUSE-ARGONNE
- French Croix de Guerre, World War I, Fourragere
- Belgian Fourragere 1940

Cited in the Order of the Day of the Belgian Army for action in the Ardennes
Cited in the Order of the Day of the Belgian Army for action at Elsenborn Crest

- Republic of Korea Presidential Unit Citation for NAKTONG RIVER LINE
- Republic of Korea Presidential Unit Citation for KOREA 1950-1953
- Republic of Korea Presidential Unit Citation for KOREA 1952-1953
- Meritorious Unit Citation (1st Battalion) for Operation Iraqi Freedom in Mosul, tal afar, Samarra and al kut (November 2003 - November 2004 - Baghdad (June 2006 - September 2007))
- Valorous Unit Award (4th Battalion) for Operation Iraqi Freedom in Mosul, Tal Afar, and Baghdad (August 2005 - December 2006)
- Meritorious Unit Citation (2nd Battalion) for Operation Iraqi Freedom in Baghdad and Diyala Province (April 2007 – June 2008)
- Presidential Unit Citation (2nd Battalion) for Operation Iraqi Freedom In Baghdad and Diyala Province (August 2009 - 2010)
- Valorous Unit Award (1st Battalion) for action in Baquabah as part of Operation Arrowhead Ripper
- Presidential ww.army.mil/article/76990/JBLM_units_receive_Navy_Presidential_Unit_Citation/
- Valorous Unit Award (4th Battalion) for RC South, Afghanistan (April 2012 – January 2013)
- Meritorious Unit Citation (2nd Battalion) for Operation Freedom's Sentinel in Nangarhar, Herat, and Kabul Province (April 2018 - January 2019)

== See also ==
- Wikimedia Commons: 23rd Infantry Regiment Heraldry
- The 'Nam
