= Battle of Bloody Ridge =

Ground combat battle that took place during the Korean War

Coordinates: 38°15′18″N 128°02′16.8″E

- Part of the Korean War
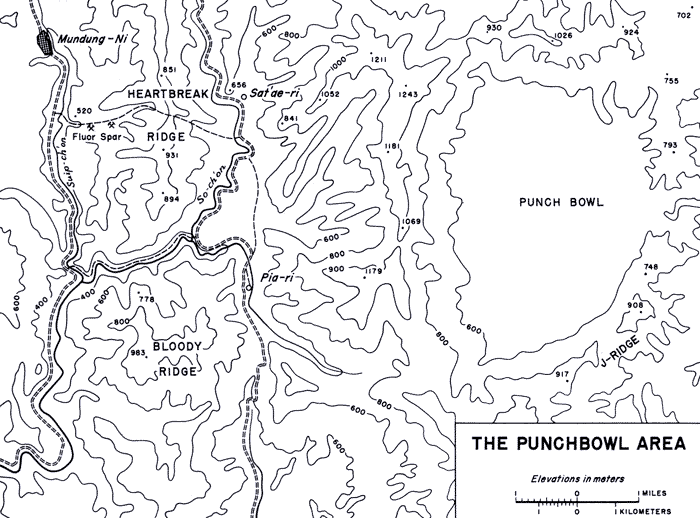
- Map of the Punchbowl, Heartbreak Ridge and Bloody Ridge
Date	18 August – 5 September 1951
Location	Yanggu County, Gangwon Province, South Korea
Result	United Nations and South Korean victory

Belligerents
United Nations: United States; South Korea	North Korea

Units involved
(United States) 2nd Infantry Division (First Republic of Korea) 36th Regiment	

Casualties and losses
2,700	US Claim: 8,000 dead 7,000 wounded

The Battle of Bloody Ridge was a ground combat battle that took place during the Korean War from 18 August to 5 September 1951.

By the summer of 1951, the Korean War had reached a stalemate as peace negotiations began at Kaesong. The opposing armies faced each other across a line which ran from east to west, through the middle of the Korean Peninsula, located in hills a few miles north of the 38th Parallel in the central Korean mountain range. United Nations and the North Korean Korean People's Army (KPA) and Chinese People's Volunteer Army (PVA) forces jockeyed for position along this line, clashing in several relatively small but intense and bloody battles. Bloody Ridge began as an attempt by UN forces to seize a ridge of hills which they believed were being used as observation posts to call in artillery fire on a UN supply road.

== Background ==
U.S. Eighth Army commander General James Van Fleet had directed U.S. X Corps commander Maj. Gen. Clovis E. Byers to eliminate important KPA observation posts that directed heavy and accurate artillery fire upon Line Kansas position from the ridge, some 2 miles (3.2 km) west and slightly south of Hill 1179. Since Van Fleet believed that the Republic of Korea Army (ROK) troops lacked self-confidence and needed experience to develop faith in their own abilities, he instructed Byers to use ROK units in the assault. Byers, in turn, attached the ROK 36th Regiment, 5th Infantry Division to the U.S. 2nd Infantry Division. The objective was an east–west ridge with three peaks, the highest at the western end rising to 983 meters. The ridge formed the crossbar of an H-shaped hill mass that overlooked the forward positions of the 2nd Division some 2 miles (3.2 km) south of Hill 983.

== Battle ==
The battle began on 18 August and after five days of repeated frontal assaults the ROK 36th Regiment took the ridge, later called Bloody Ridge, but then had to withdraw under heavy KPA pressure. General Clark L. Ruffner, the 2nd Infantry Division commander, had to commit elements of the U.S. 9th Infantry Regiment to support the South Koreans, but still the KPA refused to give ground. The North Koreans were protected by thick mine fields and strongly built bunkers that resisted destruction by anything less than accurate direct fire. With ample supplies of automatic weapons and hand grenades, they waited in their bunkers until the UN artillery and air support ceased. Then, as the Eighth Army soldiers labored up the last few yards of the steep slopes, they would move out into their firing positions and send a hail of bullets and grenades at the attackers. The steadily mounting casualty lists led to a decline in morale among the men of the ROK 36th Regiment. On 27 August some units of the regiment broke and ran, spreading panic among the elements of the U.S. 9th Regiment as well. The deterioration of the situation on Bloody Ridge led General Byers on 28 August to alter his approach and he decided upon a limited advance along the whole Corps' front, starting on 31 August. By applying pressure over a broad front, Byers hoped to force the KPA to disperse his firepower and to halt the flow of reinforcements to Bloody Ridge. Thus, Byers rearranged divisional objectives along the Corps' front. The seizure of the northwest rim of the Punchbowl was assigned to the ROK 5th Division and the northeast rim was given to the U.S. 1st Marine Division. While the 2nd Division renewed its efforts to take Bloody Ridge, the ROK 7th Infantry Division would attack and capture terrain west of the ridge.

Although the 1st Marine Division and its attached Korean Marines met little opposition on 31 August as they began their advance, the KPA forces stiffened the following day. Yet despite the increasing resistance the marines were able to push forward and take several hills on the northern rim of the Punchbowl. The KPA III Corps was in the process of moving from the ROK I Corps front and of taking over the defense of this sector from the KPA II Corps. As the KPA 2nd Division began the relief of the 1st Division, the Marines hit the latter's positions. By the time the relief was completed, in the opening days of September, the Marines had won the northern lip of the Punchbowl.

The 9th Infantry attacks on Bloody Ridge at the end of August and the opening days of September, on the other hand, failed to dislodge the KPA, whereupon Byers and Brig. Gen. Thomas E. Deshazo, who had temporarily taken command of the 2nd Division, laid out a double envelopment of Bloody Ridge using elements of the U.S. 23rd and 38th Infantry Regiments, while the 9th continued its assault on the ridge itself. On 4 and 5 September with surprising ease the 2nd Division forces advanced and took over Bloody Ridge. The KPA, weakened by heavy losses, had finally evacuated their positions and left substantial stores of supplies and over 500 dead on the heights.

== Aftermath ==
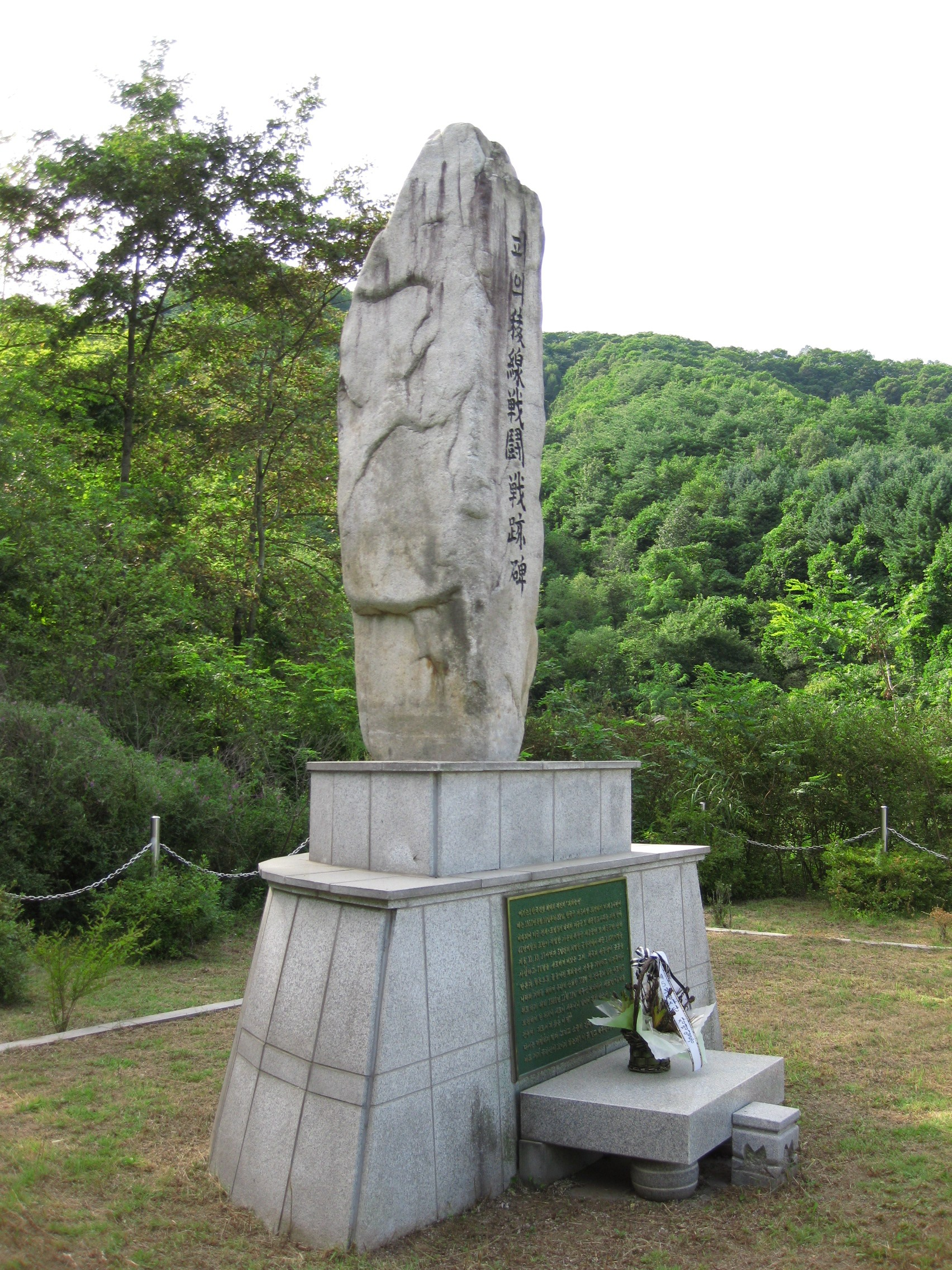
Bloody Ridge Memorial, October 2009

After almost three weeks of fighting and over 2,700 casualties, the Eighth Army had won its objective. According to 2nd Division estimates, the defense of Bloody Ridge had cost the KPA over 15,000 casualties. The advance by the X Corps in August demonstrated once again the reluctance of the North Koreans to part with any of their territory. Taking excellent advantage of the terrain and constructing well-placed defenses, they had fought bitterly to hold on to their observation posts on Bloody Ridge. Only when the attack had been broadened to apply pressure at several points along the Corps' front, and the 2nd Division had committed elements of all three of the division's regiments, and only after suffering severe casualties, did the North Koreans concede and evacuate the ridge.

The much higher KPA/PVA casualties were probably caused by:

1. poor discipline and constraining orders so strict to the point where subordinate leaders were often not allowed to withdraw under any conditions, in which case the entire unit would be blooded. Even when permission was granted for a withdrawal, it often came only after the large majority of troops in the unit had been killed.
2. the overwhelming advantage in artillery and air support of UN forces; the KPA/PVA forces had no air support. An enormously destructive "rain of fire" could be brought by UN units against KPA/PVA forces which they could not answer in kind.

After withdrawing from Bloody Ridge, the KPA set up new positions just 1,500 yards (1,400 m) away on a 7 miles (11 km) hill mass that was soon to earn the name Heartbreak Ridge.

== Bibliography ==
- Blair, Clay (1987). The Forgotten War. New York: Times Books. ISBN 5-550-68614-7.
- T. R. Fehrenbach (1964). This Kind of War: The Classic Korean War History. New York: Macmillan. ISBN 0-02-881113-5.
- (2002). Spencer C. Tucker (Ed.), Encyclopedia of the Korean War: A Political, Social, and Military History. New York: Checkmark Books. ISBN 0-8160-4682-4.
