= Battle of Heartbreak Ridge =

1951 engagement of the Korean War

- Part of the Korean War
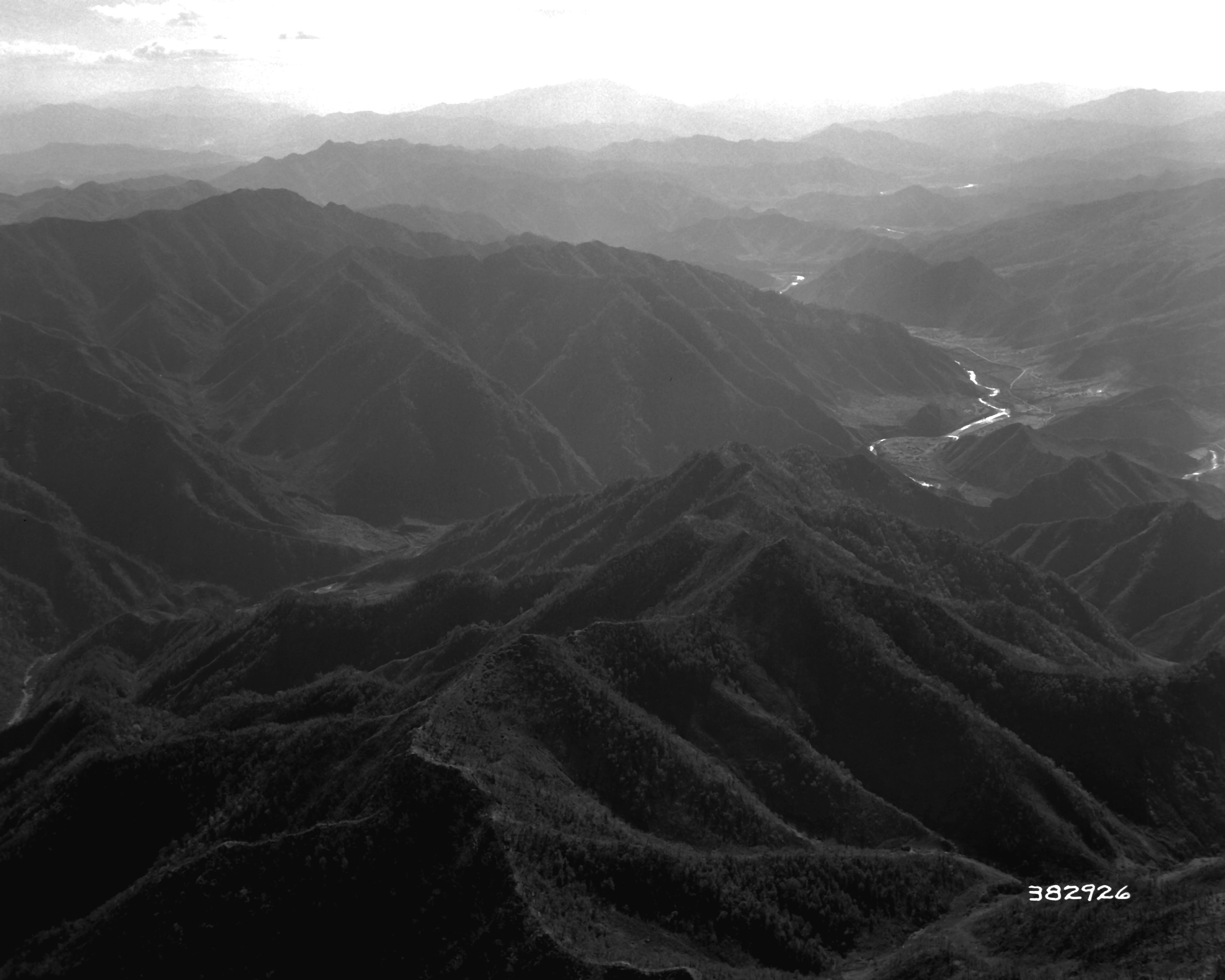
- Heartbreak Ridge in South Korea, as seen from the north.
Date	13 September – 15 October 1951
Location	38°18′N 128°1′E in Yanggu County, Gangwon Province, South Korea
Result	See Aftermath

Belligerents
United Nations: United States; France; Netherlands; Philippines; South Korea	North Korea; China

Commanders and leaders
Clovis E. Byers; Thomas F. Deshazo; Robert N. Young	Pang Ho San

Units involved
X Corps; 2nd Infantry Division; French Battalion; Netherlands Battalion; 7th Infantry Division	III Corps: 6th Division; 12th Division; 13th Division; 68th Army: 204th Division

Casualties and losses
3,700	US claim: 25,000

The Battle of Heartbreak Ridge (Korean: 단장의 능선 전투; Hanja: 斷腸의 稜線 戰鬪; French: Bataille de Crèvecœur), also known as the Battle of Wendengli (Chinese: 文登里战斗; pinyin: Wéndēnglǐ Zhàndòu), was a month-long battle in the Korean War which took place between 13 September and 15 October 1951. After withdrawing from Bloody Ridge, the Korean People's Army (KPA) set up new positions just 1,500 yards (1,400 m) away on a 7-mile (11 km) long hill mass. If anything, these defenses were even more formidable than on Bloody Ridge.

The Battle of Heartbreak Ridge was one of several major engagements in the hills of North Korea a few miles north of the 38th Parallel, the pre-war boundary between North and South Korea, near Chorwon. For the Chinese, this battle is often confused with the Battle of Triangle Hill, which occurred a year later.

== Background ==
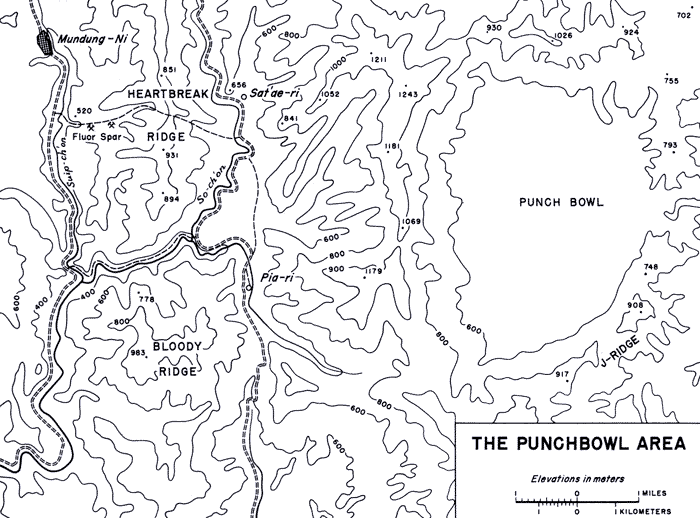
Map of the Punchbowl, Heartbreak Ridge and Bloody Ridge

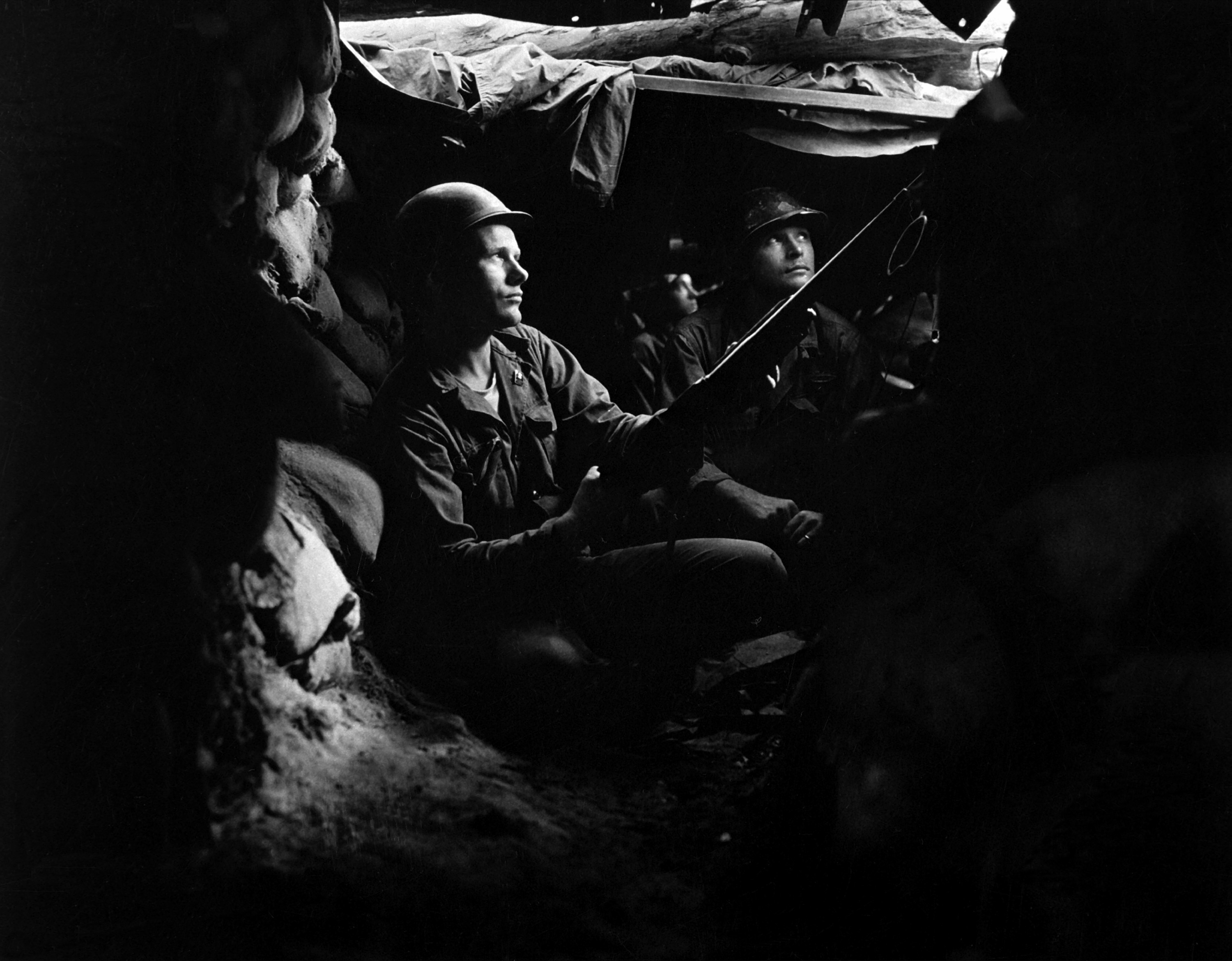
U.S. Army infantrymen of the 27th Infantry Regiment, near Heartbreak Ridge, take advantage of cover and concealment in tunnel positions, 40 yards (37 m) from the KPA/PVA on 10 August 1952

During the battle, Eighth Army commander General James Van Fleet had submitted an outline plan, called Talons, to United Nations commander General Matthew Ridgway envisioning an advance of 1–15 miles (1.6–24.1 km) to remove the sag in the Eighth Army's eastern front. Ridgway had turned down more ambitious plans for an amphibious landing near Wonsan and for a deep advance into North Korea, but he had no objection to a modest ground offensive. Preparations for Talons continued until 5 September, when Van Fleet evidently took a close look at the final casualty totals from Bloody Ridge. Since Talons would be on a much larger scale, Van Fleet decided that the operation was not worth the probable cost in lives and material. Instead he informed Ridgway that he favored sustaining his "tidying up" on the Eighth Army right flank during the remainder of September, using "elbowing" tactics without any definite objective line assigned. Around 1 October he would stop his offensive operations in the east, then launch an attack in the west with the U.S. I Corps about the middle of the month, provided the armistice negotiations permitted. If this I Corps maneuver were successful, Van Fleet would follow up with an amphibious operation on the east coast near Tongch'on. This would link up with a land advance northeast from Kumhwa. The quick change in plans surprised Ridgway, but he posed no objection to the continuation of the limited objective attacks on an opportunistic basis. The proposed amphibious assault, however, Ridgway would only approve for planning purposes.

Acting swiftly, Van Fleet issued a general directive to his corps commanders on 8 September, emphasizing limited objective attacks, reconnaissance, and patrolling. He followed up the directive the same day with instructions to X Corps to take the ridge just north of Bloody Ridge and another north of the Punchbowl. Since the KPA opposite X Corps had just sustained a defeat on Bloody Ridge, Van Fleet thought that immediate thrusts would keep them off balance and capture the new ridge lines before the KPA had a chance to recover. X Corps assigned the task of taking the peaks north of Bloody Ridge to the 2nd Infantry Division. The objective was the southern tip of a long, narrow ridge running north and south between the Mundung-ni Valley on the west and the Sat'ae-ri Valley on the east; spur ridges arching east and west from the main ridge caused one observer to describe the objective as the "spinal column of a fish, with hundreds of vertebrae." Possession of the central ridge would prevent the KPA from using the adjacent valleys to attack the X Corps defense lines west of the Punchbowl. Heartbreak Ridge, as the objective was later named by news correspondents covering the action, had three main peaks. At the southern terminus was Hill 894, which commanded the approach from Bloody Ridge, 3 miles (4.8 km) to the south; Hill 931, the highest peak in the ridge, lay 1,300 yards (1,200 m) to the north; and 2,100 yards (1,900 m) north of Hill 931 rose the needlelike projection of Hill 851.

After withdrawing from Bloody Ridge, the KPA had fallen back to prepared bunkers, trenches, and gun positions covering the approach ridges to Heartbreak that were just as strongly fortified and well camouflaged as those previously encountered by the 2nd Infantry Division. The respite between the end of the Bloody Ridge battle on 5 September and the assault on Heartbreak Ridge eight days later permitted the KPA to strengthen their defenses even further and to reinforce the units guarding the ridge and its approaches. In the Mundung-ni Valley, the KPA 12th Division of the III Corps controlled the hills on the western side of the Suip-ch'on River, while the 6th Division of the same corps was responsible for the Heartbreak Ridge and Sat'ae-ri Valley sectors. Aerial reconnaissance had revealed that the KPA had been very active in the Heartbreak Ridge area, grouping artillery and mortar units in the valleys flanking the ridge. But the heavy woods and undergrowth had veiled the elaborate fortifications and concealed the fact that the 2nd Infantry Division was again faced with the task of breaching the KPA's main line of resistance. Within the 2nd Division, there was considerable difference of opinion on the extent of the expected KPA reaction to an attack on Heartbreak Ridge. Colonel Edwin Walker, the artillery commander, felt that the North Koreans would "fight like hell" for it, while some members of the staff believed that the response would be less vigorous. Brigadier General Thomas F. Deshazo, the acting division commander, evidently was among the latter group. He decided to use one regiment, the 23rd and its attached French Battalion, rather than two in the assault force. Approaching from the east across the Sat'ae-ri Valley, the 23rd, under Colonel James Y. Adams, would cut Heartbreak between Hills 931 and 851. One battalion would then turn north to seize Hill 851, while a second would move south to capture Hills 931 and 894. As soon as Hill 894 came under the control of the 23rd, the 9th Infantry Regiment, under Colonel John M. Lynch, would advance and take Hill 728, 2,000 yards (1,800 m) to the west and slightly south of Hill 894.

== Battle ==
=== Initial assault (13–27 September) ===
On 13 September, the elements of the 2nd Division were in position and ready to attack. The French Battalion, under Lieutenant Colonel Ralph Monclar, had taken over the positions of the 38th Infantry Regiment on Hill 868, a little over 2 miles (3.2 km) east of Hill 931, and the 38th had become the division reserve, with responsibility for surveillance of the Kansas line. The 9th Regiment was poised to advance on Hill 728 when the 23rd Regiment gained Hill 894. Direct support for the 23d Regiment would come from the 37th Field Artillery Battalion, under Lieutenant colonel Linton S. Boatright, and its 105 mm howitzers, while the 503rd Field Artillery Battalion (155 mm howitzer), 96th Field Artillery Battalion (155 mm howitzer), 38th Field Artillery Battalion (105 mm howitzer) and Battery C of the 780th Field Artillery Battalion (8-inch howitzer) provided general support. The 37th and 38th Field Artillery Battalions were located about 3 miles (4.8 km) southeast of Heartbreak Ridge. The 96th and 503rd were approximately 7 miles (11 km) south and 9 miles (14 km) southeast of the objective, respectively, while the battery from the 780th was near Yach'on-ni, about 11 miles (18 km) south of Heartbreak.

At 05:30 the artillery preparation began, and for thirty minutes the guns pounded KPA positions on or near Heartbreak Ridge. Then Adams gave the signal to start the 23d's attack. The 3rd Battalion, under Lieutenant colonel Virgil E. Craven, led the way in a column of companies, followed by the 2nd Battalion, commanded by Lieutenant colonel Henry F. Daniels. As the assault troops moved north from Hill 702 up the Sat'ae-ri Valley to reach the east-west spur ridge that would serve as the approach to Heartbreak, the KPA spotted them. Heavy artillery and mortar fire from Heartbreak Ridge positions and from the heights around Sat'aeri town began to pour in on the men of the 23rd Regiment. Despite the growing number of casualties, Craven's forces pressed on, closely followed by Daniels' men. As the 3rd Battalion arrived at the east-west spur and headed up the hill to split the Heartbreak Ridge line, it ran into a hornet's nest. The KPA 1st Regiment, 6th Division, manned a series of concealed, mutually supporting bunkers that covered the approach ridge with machine guns and small arms. Added to the artillery and mortar fire that the KPA observers were directing upon the two attack battalions, the automatic weapons and rifle fire forced the assault force to halt and dig in on the toe of the spur. The prospects for a swift penetration of the KPA lines vanished as night fell; the 23rd had come up against the KPA's main defenses and another Bloody Ridge-like experience loomed ahead.

When reports of the 23rd's situation reached General de Shazo, he realized that he had underestimated the KPA's defensive capacity. Since the 9th Regiment, under Lynch, was already in position for its contemplated attack on Hill 728, on 14 September, de Shazo directed Lynch to use his regiment against Hill 894 instead. A successful seizure of Hill 894 could relieve some of the pressure on the 23rd Regiment. The 2nd Battalion, 9th Regiment, advanced from Yao'dong up the southwest shoulder of Hill 894 on 14 September, supported by tanks of Company B, 72nd Tank Battalion, the heavy mortar company, and a battalion of 155 mm howitzers. By nightfall the 2nd Battalion had climbed to within 650 yards (590 m) of the crest of Hill 894 against light resistance. The attack continued on 15 September and by afternoon, the height was swept clear of the KPA. Up to this point the 2nd Battalion had had only eleven casualties, but the next two days cost the battalion over two hundred more as the KPA counterattacked fiercely and repeatedly in a vain effort to drive it off the crest. Possession of Hill 894 by the 9th Regiment failed, however, to relieve the pressure on the 23rd as it sought again to cut the ridge line between Hills 931 and 851. The KPA's firepower kept the assault forces pinned down on the lower slopes. On 16 September Adams ordered his 2nd and 3rd Battalions to shift from the column formation they had been using to attack abreast. Thus, while the 3rd Battalion renewed its drive due west, the 2nd Battalion swung to the southwest and approached Hill 931 along another spur. In the meantime, C Company of the 1st Battalion passed through the positions of the 9th Regiment on Hill 894 and tried to take Hill 931 from the south. The three-pronged attack made little headway against the heavy curtain of fire laid down by the KPA. Secure in their strongly fortified bunkers, the KPA defenders waited until the artillery and air support given to the 2nd Division assault forces was lifted, then returned to their firing positions. As the 23rd Regiment's soldiers climbed the last few yards toward the crest, the KPA opened up with their automatic weapons, rifles, and grenades. Since the KPA controlled the Mundung-ni Valley, which offered defiladed and less steep access routes to Heartbreak Ridge, the problem of reinforcement and resupply was not difficult to resolve. In fact, General Hong Nim, commander of the KPA 6th Division, managed to send the fresh 13th Regiment in to replace the 1st Regiment on 16 September without any trouble. For the U.S. 2nd Division, the outlook was rather grim. The narrow Pia-ri Valley, southwest of Heartbreak, was jammed with vehicles and exposed to KPA artillery and mortar fire. Korean civilian porters frequently abandoned their loads along the trails and bolted for cover when the KPA got too close. To keep the front-line units supplied with food, water, ammunition, and equipment and to evacuate the casualties often required that American infantrymen double as carriers and litter bearers. The rugged terrain and the close KPA surveillance of the approaches to Heartbreak Ridge made their jobs very hazardous and time consuming, for it could take up to ten hours to bring down a litter case from the forward positions held by the 23d Regiment.

The stalemate on the ridge led Lynch on 19 September to suggest a broadening of the attack to dissipate the KPA's concentrated resistance. He urged de Shazo to let 1st Battalion, 9th Regiment, move across the Mundung-ni Valley and seize Hills 867 and 1024, located about 3 miles (4.8 km) and 4 miles (6.4 km), respectively, southwest of Hill 894. If the KPA assumed that this attack marked the beginning of an envelopment of Heartbreak Ridge from the west, they might well divert men and guns to block it, Lynch reasoned. But de Shazo rejected the proposal since General Clovis E. Byers, the X Corps commander, had earlier directed that Hill 931 be given first priority. When Major general Robert N. Young, the new 2nd Division commander, arrived on 20 September, he decided that Lynch's plan was sound. He ordered Lynch to take Hills 867 and 1024. The 9th Infantry commander scheduled the attack on Hill 1024 for 23 September; Hill 867 would be seized after Hill 1024 fell. In the meantime, Van Fleet told Byers that it would be desirable for X Corps to advance its western flank to bring the front line into phase with U.S. IX Corps'. Thus, Byers, on 22 September, directed the Republic of Korea Army (ROK) 7th Division to capture Hill 1142, located about 2,000 yards (1,800 m) northwest of Hill 1024. The double-barreled attack upon Hills 1024 and 1142 might well cause the North Koreans to take the threat seriously and weaken their capacity to resist on Heartbreak Ridge. The attacks by the 23rd Infantry against Heartbreak Ridge had continued on 21 and 22 September with little success. The 1st Battalion, under Major George H. Williams, Jr., had tried again to take Hill 931 from the south, while Daniels' 2nd Battalion came in from the north. Elements of the 1st Battalion briefly won their way to the crest on 23 September, but could not withstand the KPA's counterattack. An early morning assault from the east by a company from the KPA 3rd Regiment, 12th Division, resulted in a fierce fight that decimated the 1st Battalion. When his ammunition ran out, Williams had to pull back his men from Hill 931. Across the Mundung-ni Valley, the diversionary attacks against Hills 1024 and 1142 by the 9th Regiment and the ROK 7th Division made good progress. On 25 September, the 1st Battalion, 9th Infantry, cleared the crest of Hill 1024 and the ROK 7th Division captured Hill 1142 the following day. Recognizing the threat to neighboring Hill 867, a key terrain feature dominating the valley to the north, the North Koreans quickly shifted the 3rd Regiment, 6th Division, from Heartbreak Ridge to defend the hill. The North Korean deployment, however, did not help the embattled 23rd Regiment to capture Hill 931. Although the French Battalion replaced the 2nd Battalion and tried to advance south along the ridge line while the 1st Battalion sought to press north toward the crest of 931, the KPA 15th Regiment fought them off on 26 September. The 23rd's regimental tanks were able to move far enough north in the Sat'ae-ri Valley to send direct fire against some of the KPA bunkers covering the eastern approaches to Heartbreak, but could not destroy the heavy mortars and machine guns that halted the 2nd Division attack.

After almost two weeks of futile pounding on the KPA defenses on Heartbreak, Adams told Young on 26 September that it was "suicide" to continue adhering to the original plan. His own 23rd Regiment had already taken over 950 casualties, and the division total for the period was over 1,670. As Lynch had the week before, Adams favored broadening the attack and forcing the KPA to weaken its forces on Heartbreak. He felt that if the KPA forces in the vicinity of Heartbreak were engaged and unable to spare reinforcements or replacements for the KPA 15th Regiment, the 23rd could wear the regiment down and take the ridge. By 27 September, Young and the Corps' commander, Byers, had come to agree with Adams, and further assaults by the 23rd on Heartbreak were called off. Analyzing the initial attempts of 2nd Division to take Heartbreak, Young later characterized them as a "fiasco" because of the piecemeal commitment of units and the failure to organize fire support teams. The KPA mortars were especially effective, he pointed out, causing about 85 percent of the division's casualties up to this point.

=== Renewed assault (4–15 October) ===
==== Preliminaries ====
In the new plan that the division operations officer, Major Thomas W. Mellon, prepared in late September, the earlier mistakes were to be avoided. All three regiments of the division would launch concentrated and coordinated attacks, supported by all the division's artillery, by a full-scale armored drive by the 72nd Tank Battalion up the Mundung-ni Valley, and by tank-infantry task force action in the Sat'ae-ri Valley. When the division issued the operation order on 2 October under the code name Touchdown, General Young assigned the following objectives to his regiments:

- The 9th Infantry Regiment would advance on the western side of the Mundung-ni Valley and seize Hills 867, 1005, 980 and 1040.
- To the 23rd went the task of securing Hill 931 and the ridge line running west of that peak.
- In addition, the 23rd Infantry Regiment would be ready to attack Hill 728 or to help the 38th Infantry Regiment capture it, as the case might be, and to take Hill 520, west of Hill 851.
- The 38th would secure Hill 485 and then provide infantry support to the 72nd Tank Battalion.

The target date for Touchdown was 5 October.

The preparations for Touchdown required a period of tremendous activity on the part of the 2nd Engineer Combat Battalion and its commander, Lieutenant colonel Robert W. Love. The road along the Mundung-ni Valley was a rough track unsuitable for the medium M4A3E8 Sherman tanks of the 72nd Tank Battalion, and to get it quickly into condition for the Shermans to use was a herculean task, but Love and his men were willing to try if they had adequate fire cover while they worked. Craters dotted the track, and the KPA had planted mines along the way. At one point, they had heaped large rocks 6 feet (1.8 m) high and sprinkled the pile with hand grenades, each with its pin pulled. The 2nd Engineers put 110 pounds (50 kg) of explosives around this roadblock and detonated the grenades with the explosives. Rock from neighboring cliff walls was blasted to provide fill for the craters. Working with shovels because their bulldozers were undergoing repair and would, in any case, have drawn artillery fire from the KPA on the heights further up the valley, the engineers fashioned a usable road. To take care of the mines along the trail, they placed chain blocks of tetryl at 50 feet (15 m) intervals on the sides of the track and then set them off. The explosions detonated the mines nearby. When the craters and mines were too dense, the engineers shifted the road to the stream bed, which had not been mined, and cleared the boulders blocking the way. Bit by bit, they advanced northward up the valley.

While the engineers prepared the path for the tank attack, the 2nd Division's regiments received replacements to bring their battalions up to full strength and built up their supplies of food, equipment, and ammunition for the upcoming operation. The 23rd Regiment pulled each of its battalions out of the line for 48 hours so that the replacements could be integrated while the unit was in reserve. The division established supply points forward of Line Kansas to ensure that the operation did not fail because of ammunition shortages. Young also wanted to be certain that his battalion commanders would make full use of all the firepower at their disposal. Each battalion had to submit fire plans showing how it intended to employ its tanks, automatic weapons, small arms, and mortars in Touchdown. Sand-table models of the Heartbreak Ridge sector were used extensively in positioning the division's weapons in the best possible locations. Early in October, the three regiments moved into their attack positions. The 9th was on the left flank, ready to advance upon Hill 867 while the 38th, under Colonel Frank T. Mildren, was going up the Mundung-ni Valley. The 38th would stop near Saegonbae, southwest of Hill 894. The 3rd Battalion of the 38th was to be the division reserve and could be used only with the permission of Young. The attached Netherlands Battalion, however, provided the 38th with three full battalions. On Heartbreak Ridge, the 23rd Infantry maintained two of its four battalions on the lines between Hills 894, 931, and 851. To protect the division's right flank in the Sat'ae-ri Valley area and to distract the KPA, a task force under Major Kenneth R. Sturman of the 23rd Infantry Regiment was organized on 3 October. Composed of the 23rd Tank Company, the 2nd Reconnaissance Company, a French pioneer platoon, and an infantry company from the special divisional security forces, Task Force Sturman had the secondary mission of destroying KPA bunkers on the east side of Heartbreak Ridge and of acting as a decoy to draw KPA fire away from the 23rd Infantry foot soldiers on the ridge.

=== Operation Touchdown ===
On 4 October, 49 fighter-bombers worked over the divisional sector, and Task Force Sturman raided the Sat'ae-ri Valley. The other units of the 2nd underwent final rehearsals for the attack scheduled for 21:00 the next night. Fire support teams, usually consisting of a combination of mortars, machine guns, rifles, and automatic weapons that could be called upon by the attacking infantry whenever the need arose, were set up and given dry runs. The additional firepower would be extremely valuable against KPA bunkers and strongpoints. In the late afternoon of 5 October, the division's artillery battalions began to pummel the defending KPA units facing the 9th and 38th Regiments in the Mundung-ni Valley area. Deployed from west to east, the KPA 3rd Regiment, 12th Division, occupied Hill 867; the 1st Regiment, 6th Division, was spread from Hill 636 northwest to Hill 974; and the 15th Regiment, 6th Division, was dug in on Hill 931. As a result of the constant pressure exerted by the 2nd Division on these units during September and early October, none of them had a strength that reached a thousand men. The KPA 12th and 6th Divisions were both far understrength by the eve of Touchdown.

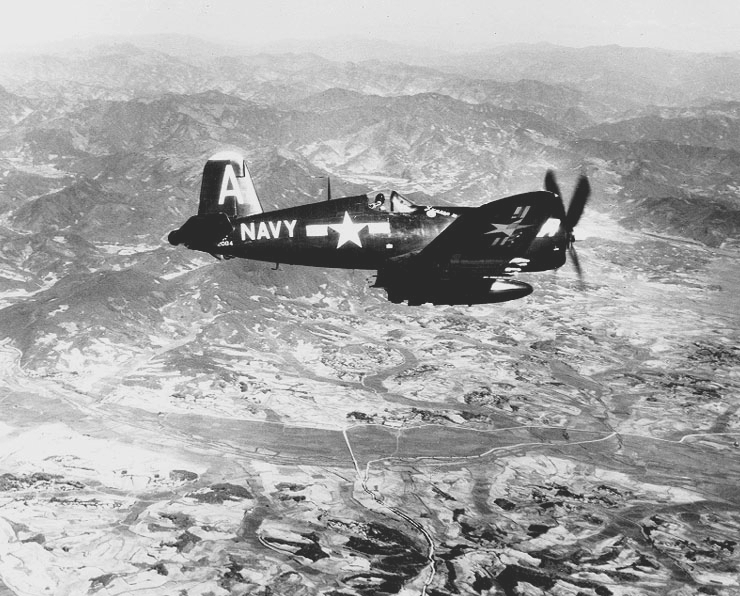
Marine F4U Corsair over Korea

Air strikes by United States Marine Corps F4U Corsairs sent napalm, rockets, and machine gun bullets into the KPA lines before the attack jumped off that evening. On the west the 3rd Battalion, 9th Infantry, pressed on toward Hill 867 and by 7 October had seized the crest, meeting only light resistance. The battalion then swung northwest toward Hill 960, while the 1st Battalion mounted an attack north against Hill 666. Both hills fell on 8 October. Then the 9th pushed on to Hill 1005 northwest of Hill 666 and, after a bayonet assault, took possession on 10 October. On the following day, the ROK 8th Division took Hill 1050 and the Kim Il Sung range to the west of the 9th Regiment. The 38th Regiment, in the meantime, had also made excellent progress. On 4 October they discovered that the KPA had abandoned Hill 485, 1 mile (1.6 km) south of Hill 728. By noon on 6 October, the 1st Battalion had advanced from Hill 485 and seized Hill 728 against only light opposition. The 2nd Battalion deployed up the Mundung-ni Valley and attacked Hill 636, which fell on 8 October. Possession of these two hills furnished cover for Colonel Love's engineers, who could now complete the tank trail for the 72nd Tank Battalion's advance. The 72nd, under Lieutenant Colonel John O. Woods, was attached to the 38th on 7 October. The regiment was given three new objectives: Hill 605, 2,000 yards (1,800 m) north of Hill 636; the Hill 905-Hill 974 ridge which extended northwest from Hill 636 toward Hill 1220 on the Kim Il Sung range; and Hill 841, 1,000 yards (910 m) north of Hill 974.

Up on Heartbreak Ridge, the 23rd Regiment was also able to report encouraging news. Adams' battle plan had directed Williams' 1st Battalion to exert diversionary pressure north against Hill 851, while the French Battalion feinted south toward Hill 931. Daniels' 2nd Battalion would hit Hill 931 from the south, with Craven's 3rd Battalion as reserve behind Daniels. Under cover of night and the distractions provided by the rest of the division, Daniels' troops moved out. KPA fire came in quickly upon the battalion, but the North Koreans could not concentrate all their attention upon this assault. With the 3rd Battalion in support, Daniels' force slowly approached Hill 931. To preserve the element of surprise, there had been no artillery preparation. The 37th Field Artillery Battalion opened up on all known KPA mortar positions as the attack got under way. The effectiveness of the counter-mortar fire helped the 23rd infantrymen as they closed with the KPA after only light losses. Flame throwers, grenades, and small arms rooted out the KPA from the formidable bunkers that had blocked the 23rd's advance for so many weeks. By 03:00 the 2nd and 3rd Battalions had captured the southern half of Hill 931. The expected KPA counterattack came and was repulsed. With the coming of daylight, the advance was renewed. The French Battalion moved in from the north and the 2nd and 3rd Battalions pressed on to meet it; before noon Hill 931 was finally in the hands of the 23rd Infantry. Craven's 3rd Battalion then pushed on to join the 1st Battalion in its assault against the last objective on Heartbreak Ridge, Hill 851.

In the Sat'ae-ri Valley, Task Force Sturman's tanks sustained their daylight raids and continued to blast away at the bunkers on the eastern slopes of Hill 851. On the west, in the Mundung-ni Valley, Woods's 72nd Tank Battalion awaited the go-ahead signal from Love's engineers. On 10 October, the engineers finished their task and the 72nd's Shermans, accompanied by Company L, 38th Infantry, and an engineer platoon, began to rumble north up the valley. By a fortunate coincidence, the KPA was caught in the middle of relieving the rapidly disintegrating elements of the KPA V Corps in the Heartbreak Ridge-Mundung-ni sector. Advance elements of the People's Volunteer Army (PVA) 204th Division, 68th Army, were in the process of taking over positions already vacated by the KPA. The tank thrust coupled with the general forward movement of the rest of the 2nd Division found the PVA still in the open en route to their new positions. Woods's tankers raced to the town of Mundung-ni and beyond, taking losses on the way, but inflicting heavy losses upon the PVA troops and cutting off the supply and replacement routes up the western slopes of Heartbreak Ridge. At intervals of about 100 yards (91 m), the tanks, operating without infantry in the northern reaches of the valley, were able to cover each other and fire at targets of opportunity. They disrupted the PVA relief effort completely and made the task of the infantry much easier in the days that followed. It was apparent that the KPA/PVA had thought that tanks could not be used in Mundung-ni Valley, and the feat of Love's engineers in opening a road had taken them by surprise. The battle, however, was not quite over. The 3rd Battalion, 38th Infantry, took advantage of the tank advance to seize Hill 605, but the 2nd Battalion's attempts to capture Hill 905 were blunted on 10 October. The next day, the 2nd Battalion overcame PVA/KPA opposition and the 1st Battalion took Hill 900. On 12 October, the 1st Battalion pushed on toward the Kim Il Sung range and captured Hill 974. The final objective of the 38th, Hill 1220, fell on 15 October.

On Heartbreak Ridge the KPA 23rd Regiment, 13th Division, defended Hill 851, backed by its sister regiments, the 21st and 19th. The 21st was to the immediate rear and the 19th defended the Sat'ae-ri Valley. On 10 October, Daniels' 2nd Battalion had swung down from Heartbreak Ridge and taken possession of Hill 520, a little over 1 mile (1.6 km) south of the town of Mundung-ni. Hill 520 was the end of an east-west ridge spur leading to Hill 851. Over the next two days, the 1st and French Battalions inched north toward the objective, bunker by bunker, taking few prisoners in the bitter fighting. The KPA/PVA on Hill 951 had to be killed or wounded before they would give up. Craven's 3rd Battalion shifted to the spur between Hills 520 and 851 to apply pressure from the west. Finally at daybreak on 13 October, Monclar's French troops stormed the peak and after 30 days of hard combat, Heartbreak Ridge was in the possession of the 23rd Infantry.

== Aftermath ==
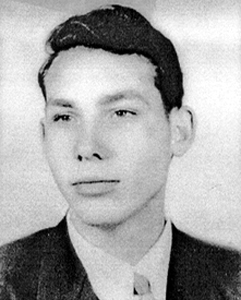
Sergeant First Class Tony K. Burris of Company L, 38th Infantry Regiment would be posthumously awarded the Medal of Honor for his actions during the battle.

The costs of the long battle were high for both sides. The 2nd Infantry Division suffered over 3,700 casualties during the 13 September to 15 October period, with the 23rd Regiment and its attached French Battalion incurring almost half of this total. The KPA 6th, 12th and 13th Divisions and the PVA 204th Division all suffered heavily. Estimates by the 2nd Division of the KPA/PVA losses totaled close to 25,000 men. Approximately half of these casualties had come during the Touchdown operation. The increase in casualties had been accompanied by a similar rise in ammunition expenditures. Besides the millions of rounds of small arms ammunition that were used, the 2nd Division received the following artillery support: 76 mm gun 62,000 rounds; 105 mm howitzer 401,000 rounds; 155 mm howitzer 84,000 rounds; and 8-inch howitzer 13,000 rounds. The division's mortar crews sent over 119,000 rounds of 60 mm, 81mm and 4.2-inch mortar fire and the 57 mm and 75 mm recoilless rifle teams directed nearly 18,000 rounds at the KPA/PVA. Although there were shortages in some types of ammunition at the theater level, Van Fleet had given the 2nd Division commander permission to fire "all the ammunition thought necessary to take the positions." To supplement the artillery support given the division, the Fifth Air Force flew 842 sorties over the Heartbreak Ridge area and loosed 250 tons of bombs on the KPA/PVA. Against the deep bunkers of the KPA, anything less than a direct hit was ineffective.

There were many points of similarity between the Heartbreak Ridge struggle and its immediate predecessor, Bloody Ridge. In both cases, the North Koreans had organized strong defensive positions in depth and had had the advantage of defiladed routes to bring in logistical support and reinforcements. The UN forces had to advance over exposed routes which the KPA artillery and mortar fire covered very effectively. The 2nd Division advance was extremely hazardous and slow as long as the KPA were allowed to concentrate their fire on relatively few targets. In both attacks, KPA capabilities and will to resist had been underestimated. Each had been planned as a small-scale advance to straighten out a front-line sag and each had suffered from a lack of adequate reserves to reinforce and consolidate the objectives after they were won. After the KPA counterattacked the Eighth Army forces, the latter had been compelled to withdraw. At Heartbreak, the Corps commander, Byers, had not permitted the 2nd Division to use the 38th Infantry Regiment until Operation Touchdown, although it was apparent long before then that the 23rd Infantry Regiment would not be able to take the ridge as long as the KPA could focus its attention upon Adams' units. The 38th had remained the divisional reserve until October, despite the need for its services. At the command level, the 2nd Division had had a change in leadership during the two operations. De Shazo had taken over the division while the Bloody Ridge fight was still in progress and he in turn had been succeeded by Young after the Heartbreak battle was well under way. Each had brought the operation he had inherited to a successful conclusion, but only after a considerable expansion of the original battle plan. Final attainment of the objective had occurred when the pressure upon the KPA had been applied at several points rather than one. Then, unable to funnel in replacements to all the threatened positions or to concentrate its artillery and mortar fire within a small area, the KPA had reluctantly withdrawn to their next defense line. Frequently, despite the artillery, tank, and air support given to the UN soldiers, the KPA would retreat only after they had been flushed from their bunkers by infantry. The KPA at Bloody and Heartbreak Ridges had fought with determination and courage throughout the battles until attrition and superior strength had forced them to yield ground.

With the successful conclusion of the Touchdown operation, X Corps had removed the sag in the Punchbowl area and in the lines held by the U.S. 2nd and ROK 8th Divisions to the west of the Punchbowl. Advances of over 5 miles (8.0 km) along this front shortened the X Corps' lines and brought them into phase with those of U.S. IX Corps to the west. The Eighth Army then planned a more ambitious follow-up, Operation Commando.

Public opinion turned against "limited-objective" operations of this nature, and military censorship resulted in far less media focus on the other October battles that followed Heartbreak Ridge.

== In popular culture ==
The battle is associated with the title and backstory of the 1986 movie Heartbreak Ridge, directed by and starring Clint Eastwood. Eastwood's character is a fictional veteran of the battle at Heartbreak Ridge (as is one other character), for which he received the Medal of Honor. The movie itself is a fictional account of events that took place much later, including the operations in Grenada.

The 2004 South Korean film Tae Guk Gi (released in the US as Brotherhood of War) also features this battle as the final battle of the film and the climax (this is evidenced when a South Korean commander, briefing his men, mentions that their objective in the attack is to take Hills 931 and 851).

Crèvecœur (Heartbreak) is a 1955 French combat documentary by Jacques Dupont featuring the battle and using actual war footage. It was nominated for the Academy Award for Best Documentary for 1955.

Heartbreak Ridge (단장의능선) is a map for the RTS (real-time strategy) computer game StarCraft. It was released in South Korea in 2009 and has since then been used in many leagues in the professional StarCraft scene, as well as in non-Korean leagues and in amateur play.

In M*A*S*H Heartbreak Ridge is mentioned in the season 11 episode "Trick or Treatment" as the location where the soldiers' buddies named "Bertleson, Wooster, Greenwade" were killed in an empty foxhole during an "early Thanksgiving".

French writer Jean Lartéguy fought in the French Battalion and was wounded by an enemy hand grenade during the Battle of Heartbreak Ridge. His novel Les mercenaires (1963) is a highly fictionalized description of the battle.

== Bibliography ==
- Blair, Clay, The Forgotten War, New York: Times Books (1987)
- Fehrenbach, T. R., This Kind of War, New York: Macmillan (1964)
- Encyclopedia of the Korean War, Spencer Tucker (ed.), New York: Checkmark (2002)
