= Blackshear M. Bryan =

United States Army general

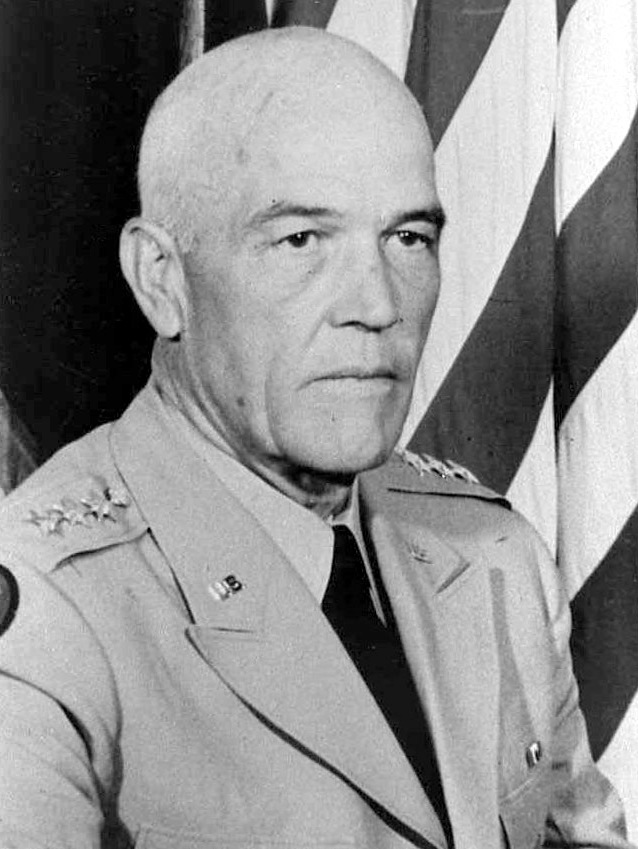
- General Blackshear M. Bryan
- Born: February 8, 1900; Alexandria, Louisiana, U.S.
- Died: March 2, 1977 (aged 77); Silver Spring, Maryland, U.S.
- Burial place: West Point Cemetery
- Military career
- Allegiance: United States
- Branch: United States Army
- Service years: 1922–1960
- Rank: Lieutenant General
- Commands: First United States Army; United States Army, Pacific; United States Military Academy; I Corps; XVI Corps; 24th Infantry Division
- Conflicts: World War II; Korean War
- Awards: Army Distinguished Service Medal (3); Air Medal
- Other work: President, Nassau Community College

Lieutenant General Blackshear Morrison Bryan (February 8, 1900 – March 2, 1977) was a United States Army general who served during the Second World War and Korean War.

== Early life and education ==
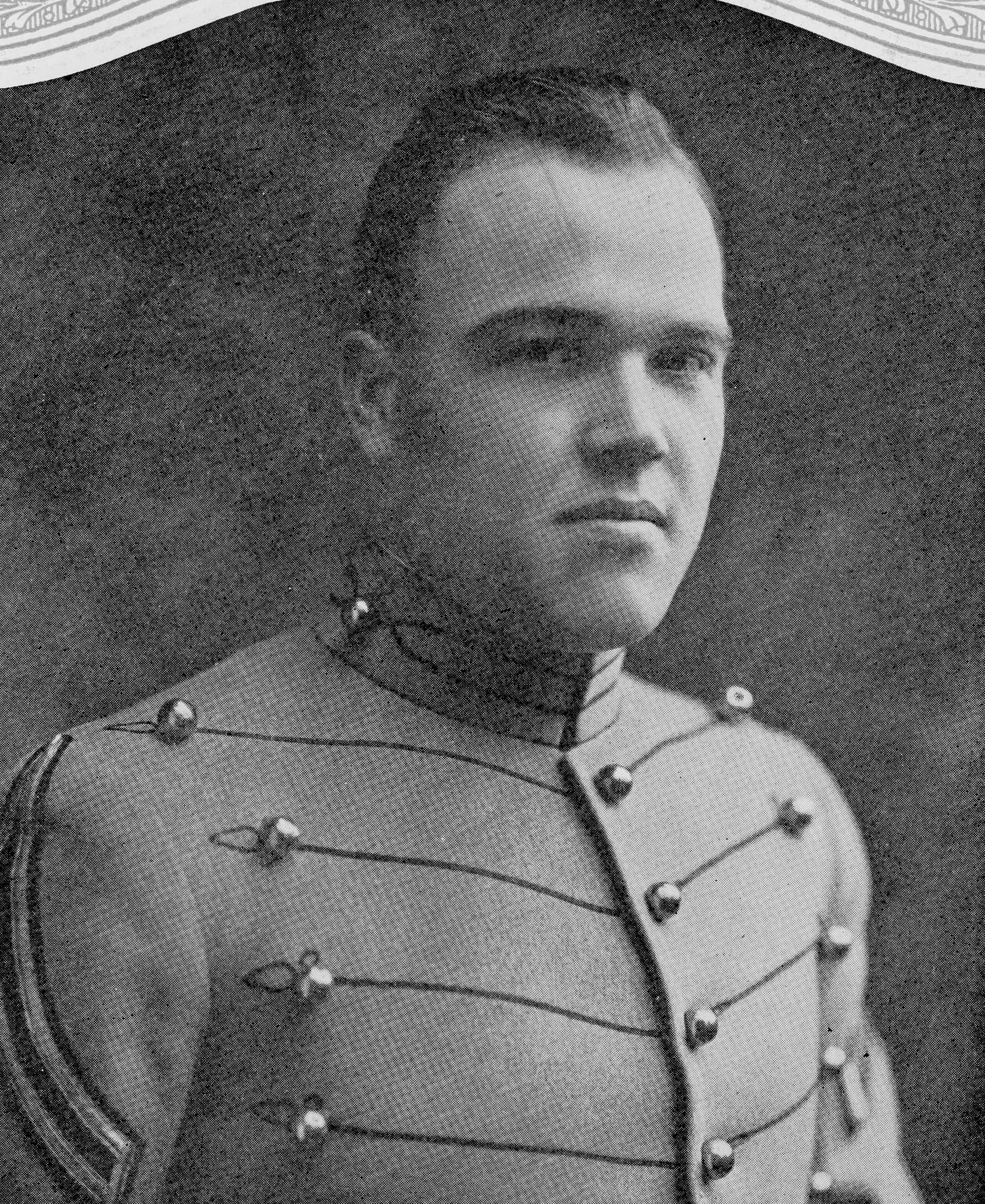
At West Point in 1922

Bryan was born in Alexandria, Louisiana on February 8, 1900. He was attending the Virginia Military Institute when he received an appointment to the United States Military Academy at West Point, New York in 1918. Because of World War I, two classes were graduated from the academy in 1922. Bryan was with the portion of the Class of 1923 that graduated after accelerated course of studies in three years, receiving a commission as a second lieutenant of artillery.

After graduation from West Point, Bryan took artillery officer training at Fort Sill, Oklahoma. He returned to West Point to serve as an assistant Army football coach during the 1925 and 1926 seasons. Bryan was also an instructor there in 1928–29 and 1933–34. He was promoted to first lieutenant in 1927 and captain in 1935. In 1936, he graduated from the Command and General Staff School. In 1940, Bryan was promoted to major and graduated from the United States Army War College.

== World War II ==
At the outbreak of World War II, Bryan was chief of the Policy Section for the War Department General Staff in Washington, D.C. where he was promoted to lieutenant colonel. In 1942 he was promoted to colonel and assigned as Chief of the Aliens Division for the Provost Marshal General's Office. With his promotion to general and a 1943 reorganization, he headed the Prisoner of War Division with charge over Japanese internment and prisoner of war camps throughout the United States. In July 1945, Bryan became Provost Marshal General and transitioned an agency whose lifespan rarely exceeded beyond the end of combat hostilities into a post-war organization with charge over Army military investigations, the military police and the Army's military police school.

== Cold War and Korea ==
In 1948, Bryan transferred to Panama Canal Zone, serving as chief of staff under General Matthew Ridgway who headed a newly established unified multi-service command structure, the Caribbean Command, the predecessor to United States Southern Command, replacing the Army's World War II Caribbean Defense Command.

In March 1951, Bryan was part of the first rotation of combat commanders since the start of the Korean War, taking charge of the 24th Infantry Division, a first combat command that he took on with Ridgeway's full faith, despite not having combat experience.

After a year in Korea, Bryan served as Deputy Chief of Staff for the Far East Command in Tokyo before commanding the XVI Corps in Japan. He then took on a leading role on the military armistice commission of the United Nations that concluded hostilities in Korea in 1953 and directed the repatriation of prisoners of war. After promotion to major general and a stint as commanding general of I Corps in Korea, he was appointed the 43rd superintendent of the United States Military Academy at West Point, serving from 1954 to 1956. It was during this time Bryan made an appearance on the March 30, 1955 episode of What's My Line?.

In July 1956 Bryan took command of United States Army, Pacific in Hawaii. In July 1957 Bryan assumed his final command as commanding general, First United States Army at Fort Jay, Governors Island in New York City. After 37 years of active duty, Bryan entered the retired list February 29, 1960.

== Retirement and family ==
From 1960 to 1965 Bryan served as the first president of the Nassau Community College in Long Island, New York.

Two of Bryan's sons also served in the United States Army:

- Blackshear M. Bryan Jr. or "Morrie" was born in 1929 at West Point during his father's tenure as assistant football coach. He attended the academy, graduating with the class of 1954. He accepted a commission with the Air Force, then transferred to the United States Army in 1963. Serving in Vietnam he was cited twice for heroism during his tour. On September 22, 1967, as he was rounding out his tour in Vietnam, Major Morrie Bryan was killed in a crash of his U-21A during a training mission as he attempted to avoid trespassers on the runway.
- James Edward "Jamie" Bryan was born in 1940 in Washington D.C; he also died in a military aircraft accident. On September 14, 1977, at 23:48 hours, Jamie was coordinating his unit's operations from aboard an Air Force Boeing EC-135K command and control aircraft that had just taken off from Kirtland Air Force Base, near Albuquerque, New Mexico. Shortly after takeoff, the aircraft banked right and crashed into a mountain peak in the Manzano Mountain range, killing all 20 military crew members aboard. Investigators said that fatigue may have played a part in the accident. Major Bryan had served two combat tours in Vietnam.

Blackshear M. Bryan died in Silver Spring, Maryland on March 2, 1977. He was interred at the West Point Cemetery on March 7, 1977.

== Citations ==
Military offices
Preceded by Frederick Augustus Irving	Superintendents of the United States Military Academy; 1954–1956	Succeeded by Garrison H. Davidson
Preceded by Thomas W. Herren	Commanding General, First United States Army; 1957–1960	Succeeded by Edward J. O'Neill
