= Clovis E. Byers =

United States Army general (1899–1973)

Clovis Ethelbert Byers
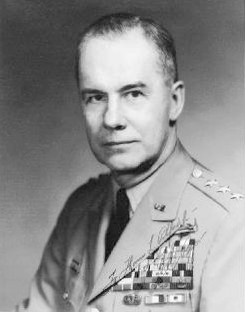
- Born: 5 November 1899; Columbus, Ohio, United States
- Died: 13 December 1973 (aged 74)
- Burial place: Arlington National Cemetery, Virginia, United States
- Military career
- Allegiance: United States
- Branch: United States Army
- Service years: 1920–1959
- Rank: Lieutenant General
- Service number: 0-12769
- Unit: Cavalry Branch
- Commands: 32nd Infantry Division; 82nd Airborne Division; X Corps; XVI Corps
- Conflicts: World War II; New Guinea campaign; Battle of Buna-Gona; Battle of Hollandia; Landing at Aitape; Battle of Biak; Philippine campaign; Battle of Leyte; Battle of Luzon; Battle of the Visayas; Invasion of Palawan; Battle of Mindanao; Occupation of Japan; Korean War; Battle of Heartbreak Ridge; Battle of Bloody Ridge
- Awards: Distinguished Service Cross Army Distinguished Service Medal (2); Silver Star (2); Legion of Merit (2); Bronze Star (3); Purple Heart; Commander of the Order of the British Empire (Australia); Military Merit Medal (Philippines) Légion d'honneur (France)

Lieutenant General Clovis Ethelbert Byers (5 November 1899 – 13 December 1973) was an American military officer in the United States Army. He is best known for his role as Chief of Staff of the Eighth Army in the South West Pacific Area during World War II and in the occupation of Japan. He was wounded while leading American troops from the front at the Battle of Buna-Gona, and also played an important part in the fighting at Lone Tree Hill, Biak, and the Philippines campaign (1944–45).

After the war, he commanded the famous 82nd "All American" Airborne Division before going on to command X Corps in the Korean War and, as such, was in overall command at the Battle of Heartbreak Ridge and the Battle of Bloody Ridge.

== Education and early life ==
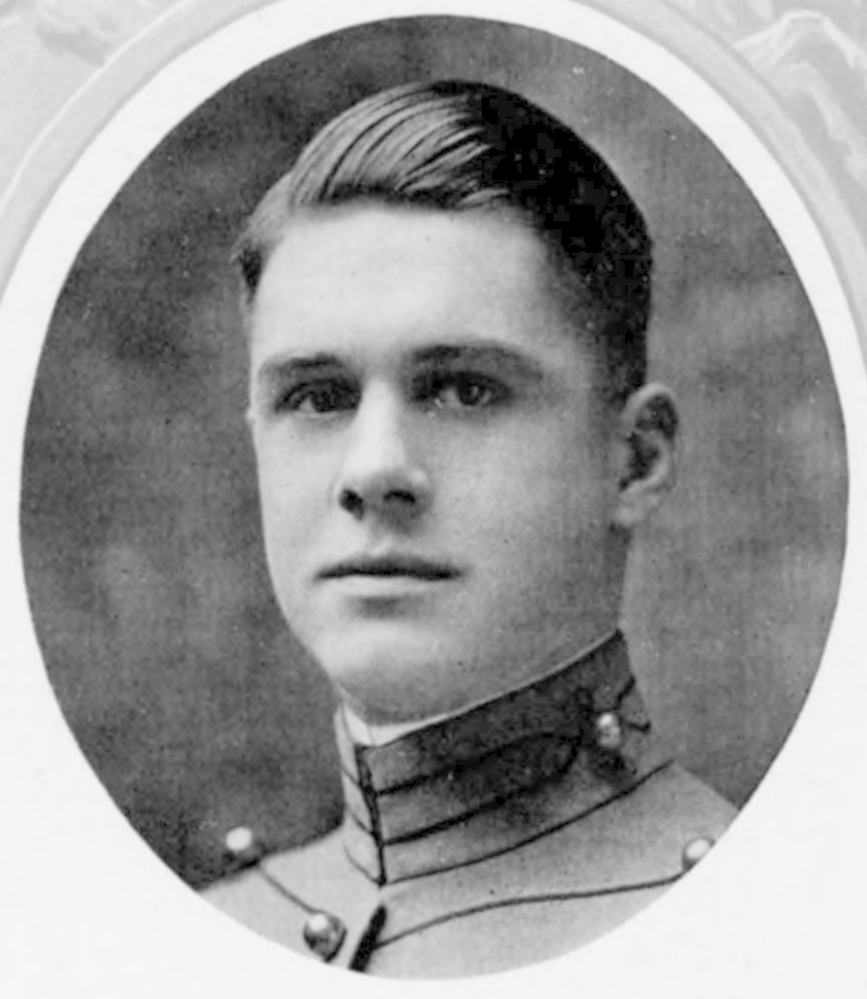
At West Point in 1920

Byers was born in Columbus, Ohio, on 5 November 1899. He entered the United States Military Academy (USMA) at West Point, New York, in 1916. He attended Ohio State University in Columbus from 1917 to 1918 before graduating from West Point from 15 June 1920. He was commissioned as a second lieutenant in the cavalry on 2 July 1920.

Byers attended the United States Army Cavalry School at Fort Riley, Kansas, from 1920 to 1921. He was posted to the 4th Cavalry at Fort Brown and later Fort McIntosh, Texas, where he commanded Troop D until it was inactivated in 1923. He attended the Signal School at Fort Monmouth from 1923 to 1924 and then became regimental communications officer of 3rd Cavalry at Fort Myer. In 1925 he was promoted to first lieutenant.

In March 1926, Byers became an instructor in tactics at the United States Military Academy. He was Assistant Master of the Sword and then Master of the Sword until 1930.

He was a student officer at the Special Advanced Equitation Course at United States Army Cavalry School from 1930 to 1931 and then served with the 8th Cavalry Regiment at Fort Bliss from 1931 to 1932. After this, Byers returned to West Point as a tactics instructor, and then as assistant adjutant from 1932 to 1934.

From 1934 to 1936 Byers attended the Command and General Staff College, where he was finally promoted to captain on August 1, 1935. On completing the course, he was assigned to the staff of the 2nd Division at Fort Sam Houston. In October 1936, he became aide-de-camp to Major General Herbert J. Brees, commander of the VIII Corps area. Byers then joined the 5th Cavalry at Fort Bliss, where he commanded Troop A from 1937 to 1938 and the 1st Squadron from 1938 to 1939.

He married Marie Richards (1900–1984) of Columbus, Ohio. They had one son, Clayton Potter Byers, who was born on June 23, 1940.

== World War II ==
Byers spent four months visiting military schools in England, France, and Germany prior to attending the U.S. Army War College from September 1939 to June 1940. He was promoted to major on July 1, 1940. On graduation he was assigned to the G-1 (Personnel) Division, War Department General Staff at a time when the workload of this division was particularly heavy owing to the vast expansion of the Army. He was promoted to wartime rank lieutenant colonel on 11 December 1941, and colonel on 1 February 1942.

In February 1942, Byers became chief of staff of Major General Robert L. Eichelberger's newly reactivated 77th Infantry Division at Fort Jackson, South Carolina. Byers would form a close working relationship with Eichelberger, who had also attended Ohio State where he too had been a member of the Phi Gamma Delta fraternity. Byers, along with a number of other staff members from the 77th Infantry Division, followed Eichelberger when the latter became commander of I Corps in June 1942.

The I Corps headquarters staff moved to Brisbane by air in August 1942, travelling on the same aircraft as former United States Secretary of War Patrick J. Hurley and the Prime Minister of New Zealand, Peter Fraser. The headquarters soon moved to Rockhampton, Queensland, where it supervised the training of American troops in Queensland.

Byers was promoted to temporary brigadier general on 31 October 1942.

=== Papuan campaign ===
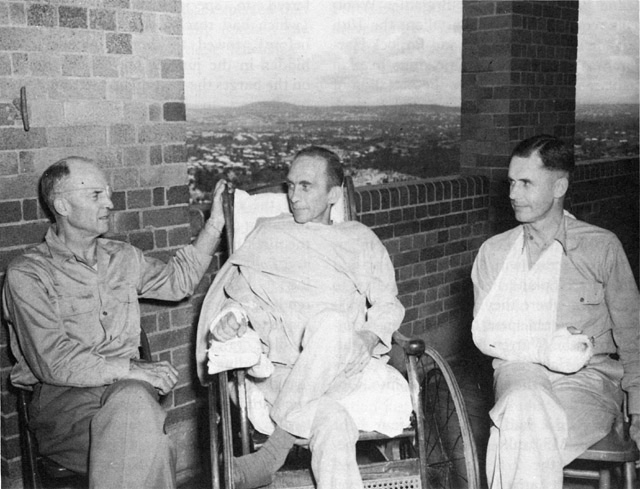
Brigadier Generals Hanford MacNider, Albert W. Waldron, and Clovis E. Byers recuperate in hospital in Australia after being wounded in the Battle of Buna-Gona

When the Battle of Buna-Gona started going badly, General Douglas MacArthur, the Supreme Commander, South West Pacific Area, decided to send I Corps headquarters to the front in Papua. Eichelberger recalled Macarthur's instructions:

"Bob," he said, "I want you to go out there and take Buna, or don't come back alive." He paused for a moment and then, without looking at Byers, pointed a finger. "And that goes for your chief of staff, too."

In accordance with MacArthur's orders, Eichelberger relieved the 32nd Infantry Division's commander, Major General Edwin F. Harding, replacing him with the division's artillery commander, Brigadier General Albert W. Waldron, on 2 December 1942. In an attack on 5 December, Waldron was shot in the shoulder by a Japanese sniper, and Byers succeeded him as commander of the troops in the field. Byers in turn was wounded on 16 December. He became the third American general to be shot at Buna, Brigadier General Hanford MacNider having been shot earlier in the fighting, none of whom was more than 75 metres from Japanese lines at the time. General Eichelberger assumed command, as he was now the only American general officer present. Waldron and Byers were awarded the Distinguished Service Cross. Byers' citation read:

For extraordinary heroism in action near Buna, New Guinea, on 15 December 1942. Immediately prior to launching an attack on an enemy position, Brigadier General Byers, without regard to his personal safety, visited the front line troops in close proximity to the enemy and to the impact are of our own preparatory mortar concentration, inspiring the men to a greater effort by his personal example. When the attack was launched, he advanced to a position within fifty yards of the assaulting troops. When wounded by an enemy sniper, he continued observation of the action and encouragement of the troops until he was evacuated. His inspiring example of heroism contributed greatly to the success of the attack.

For his role in the fighting in Papua, Byers also received the Silver Star and Purple Heart. In turn, Byers recommended Eichelberger for the Medal of Honor but the nomination was disapproved by MacArthur. Byers returned to the front on 17 January 1943, as Chief of Staff of Advance New Guinea Force, now commanded by Eichelberger. The two remained until 26 January, when they returned to Australia.

=== New Guinea campaign ===
I Corps headquarters remained at Rockhampton, Queensland, in the training role until March 1944, when it moved to Goodenough Island, where it prepared and staged for Operations RECKLESS and PERSECUTION. For his part in the operation, Byers was awarded the Bronze Star. His citation read:

For meritorious service from 7 March 1944 to 17 April 1944 at Goodenough Island, Southwest Pacific Area, and from 22 April 1944 to 30 April 1944 at Hollandia, Dutch New Guinea. As Chief of Staff, General Byers performed outstanding and meritorious services in coordinating the several planning units during the preparation for an amphibious operation. During the combat phase of this operation his unremitting tact and energy were responsible for the prompt installation and subsequent forward displacement of the task force headquarters with a minimum of confusion and delay. His outstanding example during the long hours of work under trying circumstances served as an inspiration to all those whom he came in contact.

Byers was awarded an Oak Leaf Cluster to his Silver Star in the Battle of Biak. His citation read:

For gallantry in action on Biak, Netherlands East Indies, on 17 June 1944. Troops of the HURRICANE Task Force, dispirited by three weeks of vicious fighting, were in a critical condition in the Sump area on Biak Island. The Japanese, hidden in caves, had maintained their principal lines of resistance despite all efforts of American forces. At this point General Byers made a personal reconnaissance of the most advanced positions. Although enemy mortar shells were bursting behind him, he continued to observe the enemy and to obtain information which was instrumental in the subsequent defeat of Japanese forces. The disheartened American troops were inspired by General Byers' conspicuous bravery and his disregard of danger instilled with them the spirit vital to victory. The spectacular leadership exhibited by General Byers in this action is within the highest tradition of the military service.

He was also awarded an Oak Leaf Cluster to his Bronze Star Medal. This citation read:

For meritorious achievement in connection with military operations at Biak Island, Southwest Pacific Area, during the period 15–26 June 1944. As chief of staff of a Task Force, Brigadier General Byers made frequent visits to front line elements to orient himself with regard to the situation and to familiarize the commanding general with it. On one such occasion a motor vehicle following closely behind that in which he rode was ambushed by the enemy and all the occupants were killed. In addition, he made an aerial reconnaissance of a suspected enemy point of resistance based on fortified caves. The information thus obtained was of great value in eliminating the position.

Lieutenant General Walter Krueger, commander of the Sixth Army offered to make Byers an assistant division commander. When Byers refused the offer, Krueger took this as a personal affront.

In August 1944, Eighth Army headquarters arrived in the New Guinea and Eichelberger became commander of the new army. Once again, Byers followed him as his chief of staff. For his services as Chief of Staff of I Corps, Byers was awarded the Legion of Merit:

For exceptionally meritorious conduct in the performance of outstanding services in New Guinea from 22 June 1942 to 2 September 1944. General Byers displayed exceptional ability in the coordination and operation of various staff agencies. His sagacity, unusual initiative and skillful planning were of inestimable assistance in directing operations during the Papuan and New Guinea campaigns. He fostered cordial relations with commander of Allied forces, materially increasing the effectiveness of operations. Through his diligence, sound judgment and wide experience, General Byers solved innumerable problems and contributed substantially to the success of offensive operations.

=== Philippines campaign ===
Byers remained chief of staff through the Eighth Army's operations on Leyte and Luzon, for which Byers was awarded a second oak leaf cluster to his Bronze Star Medal:

For outstanding and meritorious service from 20 December 1944 to 26 January 1945. General Byers, as Chief of Staff of the Eighth Army supervised and coordinated the plans for the preparation and movement of units scheduled to reinforce US Army troops in the Lingayen Gulf area, Luzon, Philippine Islands. The numerous obstacles presented due to widely dispersed staging areas, limited shipping facilities and the necessity of re-equipping and regrouping the units involved required close coordination of US naval and service forces and the numerous units of the Eighth Army. General Byers sound judgement, untiring efforts and tactful coordination contributed in a large measure to the success of the operation.

The Eighth Army proceeded to complete the reconquest of the Philippines with the Visayas and Mindanao campaigns. For his part, Byers was awarded the Army Distinguished Service Medal. According to his citation, Byers:

Performed meritorious and distinguished service in the Southwest Pacific Area and Japan from January to October 1945. As Chief of Staff, Eighth Army, General Byers displayed a high degree of professional skill in successfully coordinating and supervising the formulation and execution of staff plan for the assault landings and operations in the Visayan Islands, Mundanao, Luzon, the Sulu Archipelago, and for the occupation of Japan. Through his prompt and accurate solution of many problems, the Army successfully executed fifty-two amphibious assaults, nine of which were major operations, and his seasoned judgment and foresight dud much to make possible the sound initiation and effective execution of plans for the occupation of Japan.

He was also awarded the Air Medal:

For meritorious achievement from 20 October 1944 to 27 April 1945. To plan and coordinate his duties as chief of staff of an army, General Byers made numerous flights to various parts of the Philippine Islands contacting subordinate commanders and gaining first hand information on the progress of operations. Many of the flights were made over hostile territory, in an unarmed plane, and danger from enemy fire was always probable and expected. By his frequent contacts with subordinate units and the valuable information he obtained, the success of operations was greatly enhanced,. General Byers courage and devotion to duty reflect the highest credit on himself and the military service.

Byers was promoted to the temporary rank of major general on June 4, 1945, with his date of rank backdated to December 1, 1944.

=== Occupation of Japan ===
After hostilities ended, the Eighth Army participated in the Occupation of Japan. Byers landed at Atsugi aerodrome with the 11th Airborne Division on August 30, 1945. Eichelberger remained Eighth Army commander and Byers his chief of staff until Eichelberger retired in 1948. For his services in Japan, Byers was awarded an Oak Leaf Cluster to his Legion of Merit:

For exceptionally meritorious service from October 1945 to January 1948 as Chief of Staff of Eighth Army, he displayed exceptional executive, administrative and organizational abilities, and was instrumental in maintaining a smoothly functioning organization despite the many complicated situations which arose in connection with the occupation of Japan. His seasoned judgment and foresight did much to make possible the sound initiation and effective execution of plans for the demilitarization of the Japanese nation and for the conversion of Japanese industry, commerce and agriculture to a peacetime basis. the successful manner in which he fulfilled the important duties of his position was of incalculable assistance in the direction of the occupation forces.

== Korean War ==
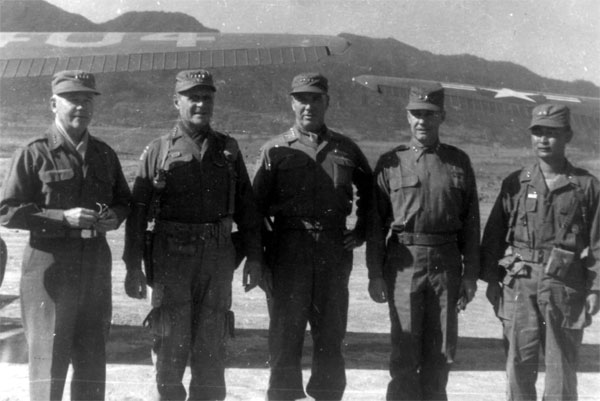
Byers (second from right) inspecting nearby Punchbowl, Korea during his tenure as the commander of X Corps in 1951

On returning to the United States in 1948, Byers became commander of the 82nd Airborne Division at Fort Bragg, North Carolina. In 1949, he returned to Washington, D.C. as Deputy Assistant Army Chief of Staff G-1 (Personnel).

In July 1951, Byers replaced Major General Edward Almond as commander of X Corps, then engaged in combat in Korea. As such, Byers was in overall command at the Battle of Heartbreak Ridge and the Battle of Bloody Ridge.

== Later life ==
Byers became commander of XVI Corps in 1952. He served as Chief of Staff of Allied Forces Southern Europe (AFSOUTH) from 1952 to 1954 and then commander of X Corps again. He was Deputy Commandant of the National War College from 1954 to 1955 and then Commandant of the NATO Defence College from 1955 to 1957.

Byers was promoted to the substantive rank of Brigadier General, United States Army in 1948, Major General in 1952, and Lieutenant General in 1955.

Byers retired from the army in June 1959. He died on 13 December 1973, and is buried with his wife Marie in Arlington National Cemetery. His papers are in the Hoover Institution.
