= Derrill M. Daniel =

US Army major general (1905–1986)

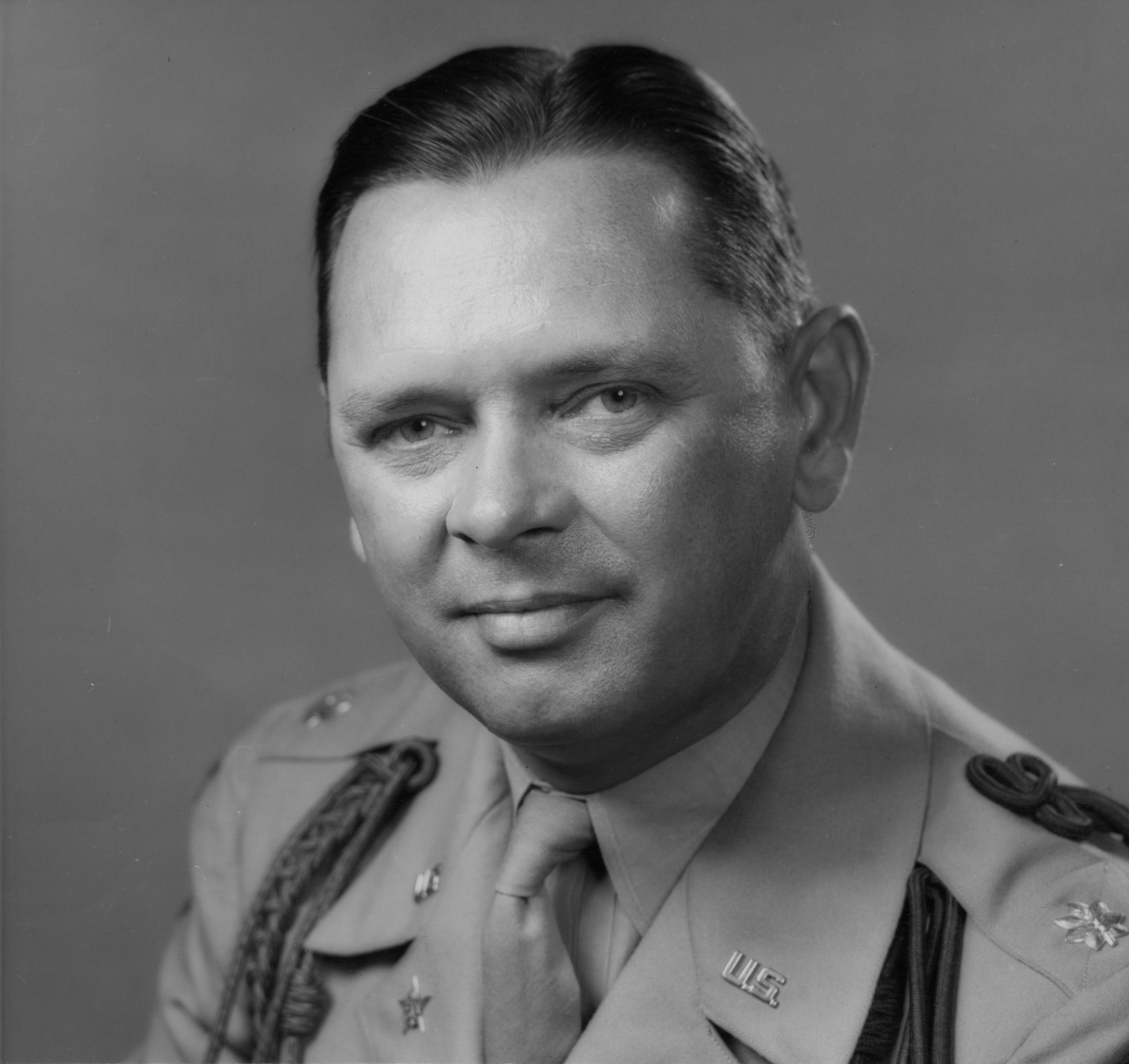
- Daniel as a Lieutenant Colonel c. 1946
- Born: November 3, 1905; Indiantown, South Carolina, US
- Died: July 24, 1986 (aged 80); Ferry Pass, Florida, US
- Burial place: Indiantown Presbyterian Church Cemetery, Hemingway, South Carolina, US
- Education: Clemson University (BS); Cornell University (MS, PhD)
- Spouse: Theodora Chase (m. 1929–1986)
- Children: 1
- Military career
- Service: United States Army
- Service years: 1926–1940 (Reserve); 1940–1963 (Army)
- Rank: Major General
- Service number: 0-235096
- Unit: US Army Infantry Branch
- Commands: 2nd Battalion, 26th Infantry Regiment; 11th Airborne Division; Special Activities Division, United States Army Europe; XVI Corps; Joint United States Military Advisory Group Philippines
- Wars: World War II; Korean War
- Awards: Distinguished Service Cross; Army Distinguished Service Medal; Silver Star (8); Legion of Merit; Bronze Star Medal (4); Combat Infantryman Badge (2); Master Parachutist Badge
- Other work: President, Gordon Military College

Derrill M. Daniel (3 November 1905 – 24 July 1986) was an American college professor and military officer. He participated in the Normandy landings as commander of 2nd Battalion, 26th Infantry Regiment. Daniel was also a veteran of the Korean War, and he attained the rank of major general as commander of the 11th Airborne Division and the XVI Corps.

A native of the hamlet of Cooper in Indiantown, South Carolina, Daniel graduated from Clemson University with a BS degree in 1925. He received his MS degree in entomology from Cornell University in 1927, and Cornell conferred his PhD in entomology in 1933. Daniel worked as a research assistant at Cornell while pursuing his doctorate, and he later joined the faculty as an assistant professor of entomology. In 1926, Daniel joined the Organized Reserve Corps (later renamed the United States Army Reserve) as a second lieutenant of Infantry. He remained in the reserve until 1940, when he was called to active duty as a captain during the army's expansion in anticipation of US entry into World War II.

Daniel underwent pre-deployment training at Fort Devens, Massachusetts as a member of the 1st Infantry Division. By 1942, he was commander of the division's 2nd Battalion, 26th Infantry Regiment with the rank of lieutenant colonel. He led his battalion during campaigns in North Africa and Sicily, and participated in the D-Day landings in Normandy. 2nd Battalion participated in combat across France into Germany, and Daniel remained in command until the end of the war in May 1945.

After the war, Daniel remained on active duty and served as assistant plans, operations, and training officer (G-3) at the Army Ground Forces headquarters. He graduated from the United States Army Command and General Staff College (CGSC) in 1947 and the Armed Forces Staff College in 1948, after which he was assigned to the CGSC faculty. In 1951, he graduated from the United States Army War College, after which he spent a year on the faculty.

During the Korean War, Daniel served as deputy chief of staff for operations (G3) for IX Corps, followed by assignment as assistant division commander of the 7th Infantry Division. After the war, he served as assistant division commander of the 82nd Airborne Division, followed by promotion to major general and assignment as commander of the 11th Airborne Division. In 1956, Daniel was appointed chief of the Special Activities Division for United States Army Europe, and he held this position until 1958, when he was appointed to command XVI Corps. In 1959, he was appointed to command Joint United States Military Advisory Group Philippines. In 1962, he was appointed deputy commander of Third United States Army, and he served in this position until retiring in April 1963. After leaving the army, Daniel was president of Gordon Military College from 1963 to 1964.

== Early life ==
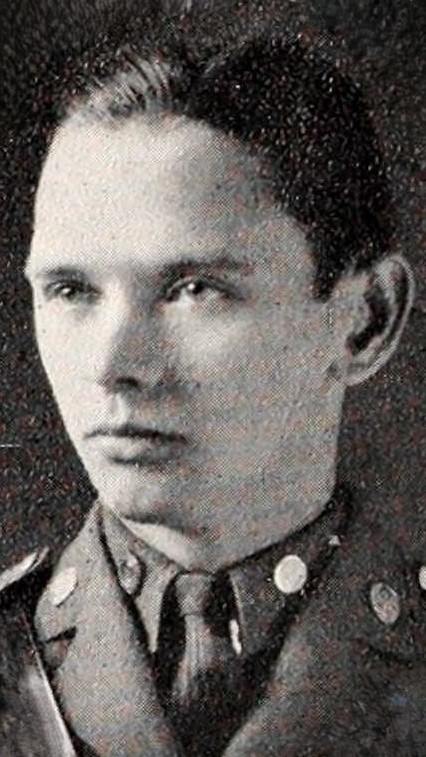
Daniel as a college senior

Derrill McCollough Daniel was born in the Indiantown, South Carolina hamlet of Cooper on 3 November 1905, a son of William Dodd Daniel and Harriet Belle (McCollough) Daniel. He was raised and educated in Indiantown and graduated from Indiantown High School, then began attendance at Clemson University. He received his Bachelor of Science degree in agriculture from Clemson in 1925. Daniel's Clemson classmates nicknamed him "Bebe" (Note: Pronounced "Bee Bee".) after Bebe Daniels, a famous actress of the silent film era. While at Clemson, Daniel participated in the school's corps of cadets; during his first three years of college, he was a private in the cadet regiment. In his fourth year, he attained the rank of second lieutenant in the regiment's 3rd Battalion.

During his Clemson years, he belonged to the Williamsburg Country Club, of which he was president in 1925. He was also a member of the Senior Dancing Club and the Wade Hampton Literary Society. Daniel was both Junior and Senior Literary Critic, as well as a member of the Horticulture Club. He attended Clemson's Bible class and belonged to the Ommatidia Club. He was also a member of the school's track team, which won the state championship in 1924. After graduating from Clemson, Daniel pursued graduate education at Cornell University, and he received his MS in entomology in 1928.

== Start of career ==
While a student at Cornell, Daniel joined the Organized Reserve Corps (now called the United States Army Reserve). Commissioned as a second lieutenant of Infantry, he served as a reservist until 1940 and advanced to captain. In November 1929, Daniel married Theodora Chase; they were the parents of a daughter, also named Theodora. Daniel resided in the town of Geneva and worked as a research assistant at Cornell while pursuing his doctorate, and he received his PhD in entomology from Cornell in 1933. He then joined the Cornell faculty, where he was an assistant professor of entomology until the start of World War II. In 1935, Daniel completed the Infantry School course for National Guard and Reserve officers.

=== Works by ===
- Daniel, Derrill M. (February 1928). "Biology and Control of the Blackberry Leaf-Miner". Technical Bulletin 133, New York State Agricultural Experiment Station. Ithaca, New York: Cornell University. pp. 1–38 – via Google Books.
- Daniel, Derrill M. (November 1928). "The Oriental Peach Moth In New York". Circular No. 106, New York State Agricultural Experiment Station. Ithaca, New York: Cornell University. pp. 1–8 – via Google Books.
- Daniel, Derrill M. (1932). Macrocentrus Ancylivorus Rohwer, a Polyembryonic Braconid Parasite of the Oriental Fruit Moth. Ithaca, New York: Cornell University.
- Daniel, Derrill M.; Cox, James; Crawford, Aubrey (September 1933). "Biological Control of the Oriental Fruit Moth". Bulletin No. 635, New York State Agricultural Experiment Station. Ithaca, New York: Cornell University. pp. 1–36 – via HathiTrust.
- Daniel, Derrill M.; Cox, James A. (July 1936). "Oriental Fruit Moth Control In Quince Plantings". Bulletin No. 609, New York State Agricultural Experiment Station. Ithaca, New York: Cornell University. pp. 1–24 – via HathiTrust.

== Continued career ==
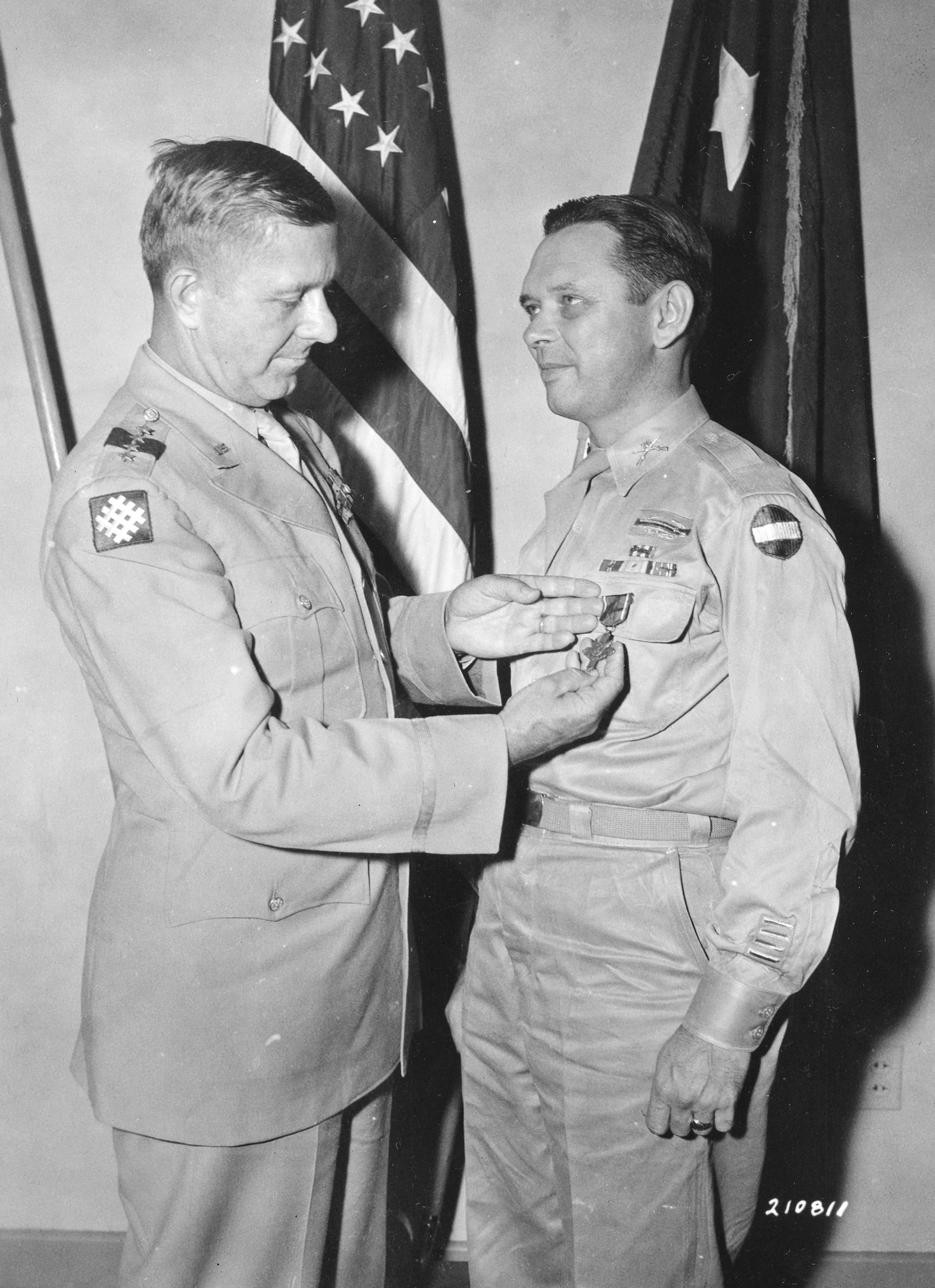
Daniel receives the Distinguished Service Cross from General Jacob L. Devers in September 1945

In December 1940, Daniel was a captain when he was called to active duty as the army began to expand in anticipation of U.S. entry into World War II. Initially assigned as a training officer and instructor with the Rochester, New York Military District, he was subsequently assigned to the 1st Infantry Division during pre-deployment training at Fort Devens, Massachusetts. He was quickly promoted to major in the Army of the United States and assigned as a battalion executive officer. Assigned to command 2nd Battalion, 26th Infantry Regiment, Daniel led the unit during the North Africa campaign and Allied invasion of Sicily. By now a lieutenant colonel, Daniel remained in command when 2nd Battalion took part in the 6 June 1944 Normandy landings. 2nd Battalion continued to take part in combat in France and Germany, and Daniel was still in command in May 1945, when the war ended in Europe.

After returning to the United States, Daniel was assigned as assistant plans, operations and training officer (G-3) on the staff of the Army Ground Forces. He transferred from the reserve to the regular army in 1946, and was promoted to major in November 1947 and lieutenant colonel in July 1948. Daniel was a 1947 graduate of the United States Army Command and General Staff College (CGSC). In 1948, he completed the course at the Armed Forces Staff College, after which he was posted to Fort Leavenworth, Kansas and appointed to the CGSC faculty. In September 1950, Daniel was promoted to colonel. He graduated from the United States Army War College (AWC) in 1951, after which he spent a year on the AWC faculty.

== Later career ==
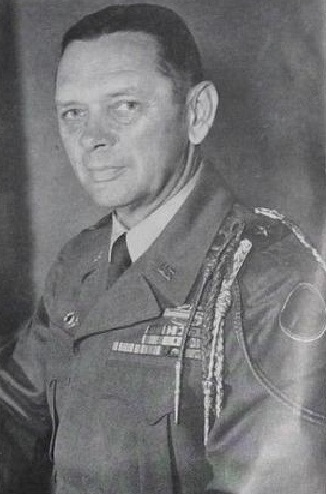
Daniel as a brigadier general in 1952

In April 1952, Daniel was assigned to Korean War service as deputy chief of staff for operations on the staff of the IX Corps. In September 1952, he was promoted to brigadier general and assigned as assistant division commander of the 7th Infantry Division, which was involved in combat in Korea. After his return to the United States, Daniel completed the course at the United States Army Airborne School. He was then assigned as assistant division commander of the 82nd Airborne Division.

In May 1955, Daniel was promoted to major general and assigned to command the 11th Airborne Division at Fort Campbell, Kentucky. He led this unit until September 1956, including its relocation from Kentucky to West Germany during the Cold War. He was then appointed chief of the Special Activities Division for United States Army Europe. In January 1958, Daniel was assigned to command XVI Corps in Omaha, Nebraska. In April 1959, he was assigned as commander of Joint United States Military Advisory Group Philippines. In May 1962, Daniel was assigned to Fort McPherson, Georgia as deputy commander of Third United States Army. He served in this post until retiring in April 1963.

From 1963 to 1964, Daniel was president of Georgia's Gordon Military College. In retirement, Daniel was a resident of Stuart, Florida until 1983, when he moved to Pensacola, Florida. Daniel was an active Freemason, including membership in the Scottish Rite. He was also a member of the Shriners and was an organizer of the United States Power Squadrons unit that was active on the St. Lucie River. He died at a nursing home in the Ferry Pass neighborhood of Pensacola on 24 July 1986. Daniel was buried at Indiantown Presbyterian Church Cemetery in Hemingway, South Carolina.

== Awards ==
Daniel's US awards included:

- Distinguished Service Cross
- Army Distinguished Service Medal
- Silver Star with 7 oak leaf clusters
- Legion of Merit
- Bronze Star Medal with three oak leaf clusters
- Combat Infantryman Badge (2)
- Master Parachutist Badge

His foreign decorations included:

- French Fourragère
- Belgian Fourragère
- Order of the Crown with Palm (Belgium)
- Croix de guerre (Belgium)
- Order of Military Merit (South Korea) (Eulji)

=== Distinguished Service Cross citation ===
The President of the United States of America, authorized by Act of Congress, July 9, 1918, takes pleasure in presenting the Distinguished Service Cross to Lieutenant Colonel (Infantry) Derrill McCollough Daniel (ASN: 0–235096), United States Army, for extraordinary heroism in connection with military operations against an armed enemy while serving as Commanding Officer of the 2d Battalion, 26th Infantry Regiment, 1st Infantry Division, in action against enemy forces in Belgium, on 20 December 1944. On that date, near Butrgengach, Belgium, when three enemy tanks penetrated to within fifty yards of the battalion command post, Colonel Daniel organized rocket teams and, under withering enemy fire, courageously coordinated their fire with that from tank destroyers and drove the enemy tanks from the area. Realizing the tank penetration indicated an imminent enemy attack, he fearlessly proceeded to the front lines and by his cool example of leadership inspired his men to repulse fanatical enemy counterattacks. Lieutenant Colonel Daniel's heroic actions and unswerving devotion to duty exemplify the highest traditions of the military forces of the United States and reflect great credit upon himself, the 1st Infantry Division, and the United States Army.

Service: United States Army Rank: Lieutenant Colonel (Infantry) Battalion: 2nd Battalion Regiment: 26th Infantry Regiment Division: 1st Infantry Division Action Date: December 20, 1944 Orders: Headquarters, Third U.S. Army, General Orders No. 137 (June 11, 1945)

== Effective dates of rank ==
Daniel's effective dates of rank were:

- Second Lieutenant (Reserve), 6 November 1926
- First Lieutenant (Reserve), 8 April 1933
- Captain (Reserve), 10 May 1937
- Captain (Army of the United States), 3 November 1940
- Major (Army of the United States), 1 February 1942
- Lieutenant Colonel (Army of the United States), 19 March 1943
- Major (Regular Army), 3 November 1947
- Lieutenant Colonel (Regular Army), 15 July 1948
- Colonel (Army of the United States), 7 September 1950
- Brigadier General (Army of the United States), 19 September 1952
- Colonel (Regular Army), 23 June 1953
- Major General (Army of the United States), 4 May 1955
- Major General (Retired), 30 April 1963
