= Robert Nicholas Young =

United States Army general

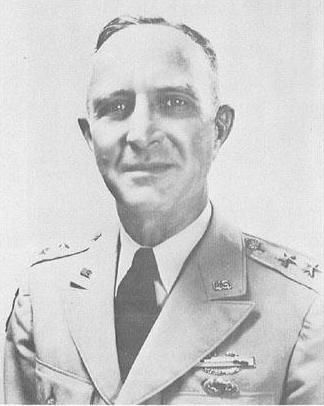
- Young as commander of the United States Infantry School
- Born: 14 January 1900; Washington, D.C., U.S.
- Died: 19 October 1964 (aged 64); Asheville, North Carolina, U.S.
- Burial place: Arlington National Cemetery
- Military career
- Allegiance: United States
- Branch: United States Army
- Service years: 1923–1957
- Rank: Lieutenant General
- Commands: Sixth United States Army; United States Army Infantry School; 2nd Infantry Division; Combined Arms Center; Military District of Washington; 3rd Infantry Division
- Conflicts: World War II; Korean War
- Awards: Army Distinguished Service Medal (3); Silver Star; Legion of Merit; Bronze Star Medal (2); Purple Heart

Robert Nicholas Young (14 January 1900 – 19 October 1964) was a lieutenant general in the United States Army. He gained prominence in the 1950s as the commander of the 2nd Infantry Division during the Korean War and as commander of the Sixth United States Army.

== Early life ==
Young was born on 14 January 1900, in Washington, D.C. He graduated from the University of Maryland in 1922 and received his commission as a second lieutenant of infantry through the Reserve Officer Training Corps.

== Early military career ==
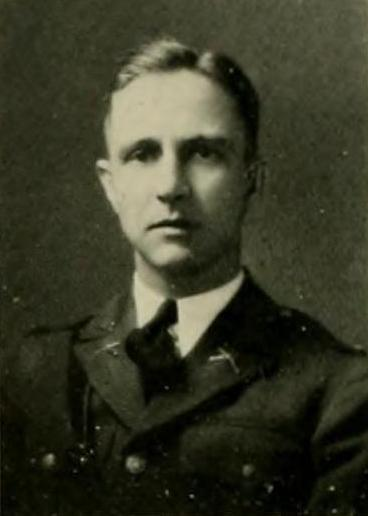
1LT Young as assistant professor of military science for the University of Maryland's R.O.T.C. program

After receiving his commission, Young served in positions of increasing rank and responsibility throughout the United States, including Fort Eustis, Virginia, Camp Meade, Maryland, and San Juan, Puerto Rico. In the late 1920s and early 1930s, he served as assistant professor of military science in the R.O.T.C. program at the University of Maryland.

In 1933, Young graduated from the Infantry School Officer Course, and completed the Signal School Commanding Officer Course in 1934.

In the mid-1930s, Young served as an instructor at the Fort Benning, Georgia, Infantry School. He was a 1938 graduate of the Command and General Staff College.

== World War II ==
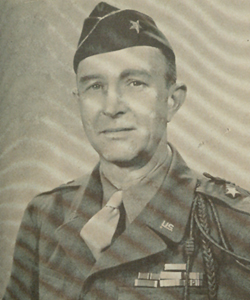
BG Young as assistant division commander, 3rd Infantry Division, World War II

From 1941 to 1942, Young served as assistant secretary to the General Staff at the War Department, afterwards advancing to become secretary to the General Staff, where he served until 1943.

Young was assigned as assistant division commander of the 70th Infantry Division from 1943 to 1944 during its combat service in Europe. From 1944 to 1945, he continued to serve in Europe as assistant division commander and acting division commander of the 3rd Infantry Division. Young's daughter died in April 1945 while he was serving with the 3rd Division in France.

== Post-World War II ==
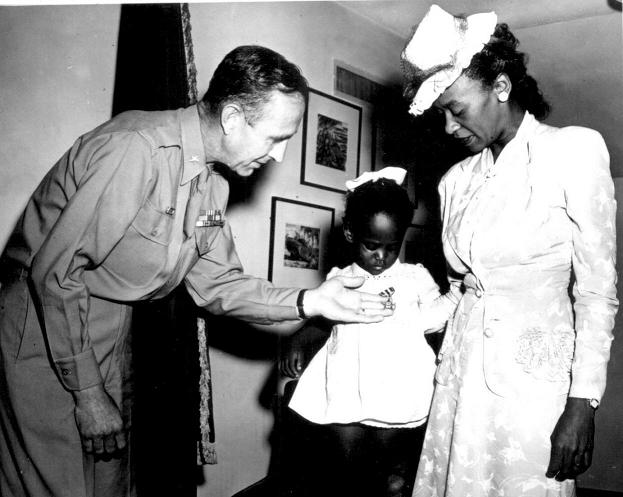
BG Young as commander of the Military District of Washington with Melba Rose, age 2, daughter of Mrs. Rosie L. Madison, as they view the Silver Star awarded to her father 1LT John W. Madison, who was killed in action in Italy

Young's service continued after World War II. In 1945, he succeeded Charles F. Thompson as commander of the Military District of Washington, and he remained in this position until 1946. Young commanded the Army's Combined Arms Center at Fort Leavenworth, Kansas from 1946 to 1948. From 1948 to 1950 Young, served in Hawaii as Chief of Staff for U.S. Army, Pacific. From 1950 to 1951, Young was assistant division commander of the 82nd Airborne Division.

== Korean War ==
From 1951 to 1952, Young commanded the 2nd Infantry Division. He led the division during the Battle of Heartbreak Ridge.

== Post-Korean War ==
Young was commander of the United States Army Infantry School from 1952 to 1953. In 1953, Young was named the Army’s Assistant Chief of Staff for Personnel, G-1, where he served until 1955. Young was appointed commander of the Sixth United States Army in 1955, and served in this post until his 1957 retirement.

== Awards and decorations ==
Young's awards included three Army Distinguished Service Medals, the Silver Star, the Legion of Merit, two awards of the Bronze Star Medal, and the Purple Heart.

== Retirement and death ==
In retirement, General Young resided in Asheville, North Carolina. He died there on 19 October 1964, and was buried in Arlington National Cemetery, Section 6, Site 5685 RH.

Military offices
Preceded by Willard G. Wyman	Commanding General of the Sixth United States Army; 1955–1957	Succeeded by Lemuel Mathewson
