= XVI Corps (United States) =

American military unit

- Shoulder sleeve insignia of XVI Corps.
- Active: 29 July 1921–1 October 1933; 1 October 1933–7 December 1945; 25 May 1951–20 November 1954; 30 October 1957–30 April 1968
- Country: United States of America
- Branch: United States Army
- Role: Headquarters
- Size: Corps
- Engagements: World War II; Rhineland; Central Europe

Commanders
- Notable commanders: John B. Anderson (1943–1945); Samuel Tankersley Williams (1953–1954)

Insignia
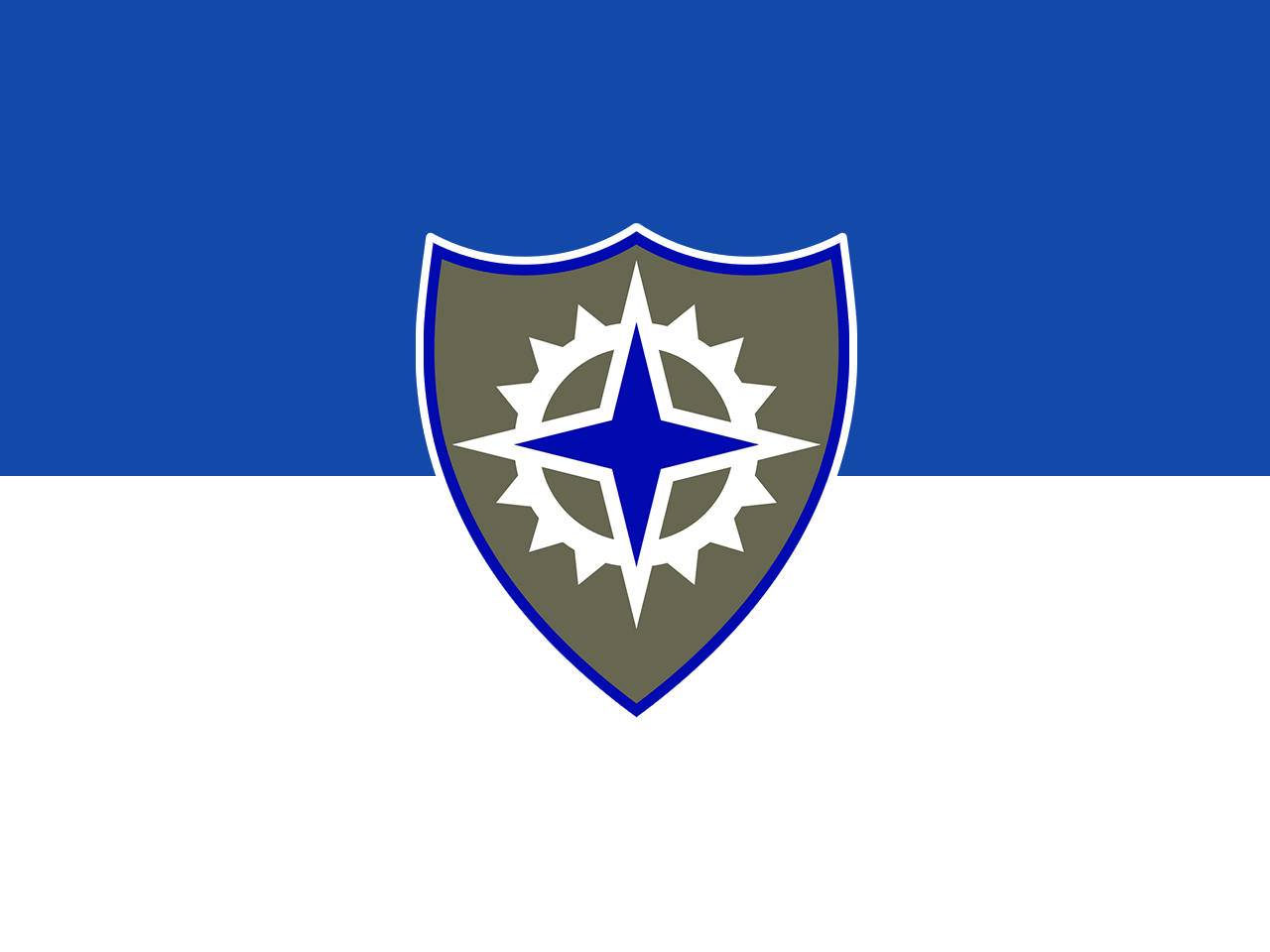
- XVI Corps Flag

The XVI Corps was a corps-sized formation of the United States Army.

== History ==
=== Interwar period ===
==== XVI Corps (I) ====
The XVI Corps was authorized by the National Defense Act of 1920 and was to be composed of units of the Organized Reserve located primarily in the Sixth Corps Area. The headquarters and headquarters company were constituted on 29 July 1921 in the Regular Army, allotted to the Sixth Corps Area, and assigned to the Fifth Army. The headquarters was organized in October 1922 with Organized Reserve personnel at Detroit, Michigan. The headquarters company was organized on 18 October 1922 with Organized Reserve personnel at Saginaw, Michigan, and relocated on 1 October 1926 to Detroit. The headquarters was withdrawn from the Regular Army on 1 October 1933 and demobilized.

==== XVI Corps (II) ====
The second iteration of the XVI Corps was constituted in the Organized Reserve on 1 October 1933, allotted to the Sixth Corps Area, and assigned to the Second Army. The headquarters was concurrently initiated at Detroit, Michigan, with Organized Reserve personnel previously assigned to the demobilized XVI Corps (RAI). The designated mobilization station was Camp Grant, Illinois, where the corps headquarters would assume command and control of its subordinate corps troops mobilizing throughout the Sixth Corps Area. It was redesignated on 1 January 1941 as Headquarters, XVI Army Corps. The XVI Army Corps was not activated prior to World War II and was located in Detroit as of 7 December 1941 in a reserve status.

=== World War II ===
The XVI Corps was ordered to active duty on 7 December 1943 at Fort Riley, Kansas. During World War II, XVI Corps fought in the European Theater of Operations as part of the Ninth United States Army. The Corps comprised the 29th Infantry Division under Major General Charles H. Gerhardt, the 75th Infantry Division under Major General Ray E. Porter, the 79th Infantry Division under Major General Ira T. Wyche, and the 95th Infantry Division under Major General Harry L. Twaddle.

After the end of the war the corps was inactivated on 7 December 1945 at Camp Kilmer, New Jersey.

XVI Corps was reactivated in April 1951 as the Far East Command reserve. Following its reactivation in May 1951, XVI Corps was headquartered at Sendai, Japan, until it was deactivated there on 20 November 1954. The corps mission was to control divisions and other units attached to it by Far East Command. Elements of the 40th and 24th Infantry Divisions and the 1st Cavalry Division under XVI Corps control were stationed at Camp Schimmelpfennig from 1951 until after the corps was inactivated.

The corps was active again from 22 November 1957 until 30 April 1968 at Omaha, Nebraska. During this time, the Corps oversaw a number of Army Reserve units in the southwestern mid-West and the mountain states.

Major General Kermit L. Davis wrote regarding the XVI Corps during the Vietnam War: '.. "I was then assigned as CG, XVI Corps, in Omaha, in charge of the Reserves of Kansas, Nebraska, Colorado, and Wyoming. This turned out to be mostly fire suppression, because ..Robert McNamara had just announced the Reserves should be merged with the National Guard. I had to try to convince my 27,000 reservists that he didn't really mean it. Nobody believed me, and I spent a frustrating two years smoothing ruffled political feathers. Powerful politicians prevented the merger, ..'

In most cases, the units supervised by the various corps spread around the United States were transferred to the supervision of the new Army Reserve Commands. The 89th Army Reserve Command was established in Nebraska in 1967-68.

== Campaign credits ==
- Rhineland
- Central Europe

== Commanders ==
- Maj. Gen. John B. Anderson (December 1943 – October 1945)
- Maj. Gen. Thomas D. Finley (October 1945 – December 1945)
- Maj. Gen. Roderick R. Allen (August 1951 – 1952)
- Maj. Gen. Clovis E. Byers (1952–1952)
- Maj. Gen. Blackshear M. Bryan (1952 – August 1953)
- Maj. Gen. Samuel T. Williams (August 1953 – November 1954)
- Maj. Gen. Derrill M. Daniel (January 1958 – April 1959)

Artillery commander

- Brig. Gen. Charles C. Brown (December 1943 – December 1945)
