= Tony K. Burris =

Medal of honor recipient

Tony Kenneth Burris
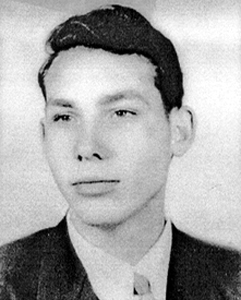
- Born: May 30, 1929; Blanchard, Oklahoma, United States
- Died: October 9, 1951 (aged 22); Heartbreak Ridge, Gangwon Province, Korea
- Burial place: Blanchard Cemetery
- Military career
- Allegiance: United States
- Branch: United States Army
- Service years: 1947–1951
- Rank: Sergeant First Class
- Units: 3rd Battalion, 38th Infantry Regiment, 2nd Infantry Division
- Conflicts: Korean War: Battle of Heartbreak Ridge (DOW)
- Awards: Medal of Honor; Silver Star; Purple Heart

Tony Kenneth Burris (May 30, 1929 – October 9, 1951) was a Choctaw soldier in the United States Army during the Korean War, who was posthumously awarded the Medal of Honor for his actions on October 8–9, 1951, during the Battle of Heartbreak Ridge.

He is buried in Blanchard Cemetery, Blanchard, Oklahoma. His grave can be found at GPS (lat/lon): 35.1591, -97.65226.

== Medal of Honor citation ==
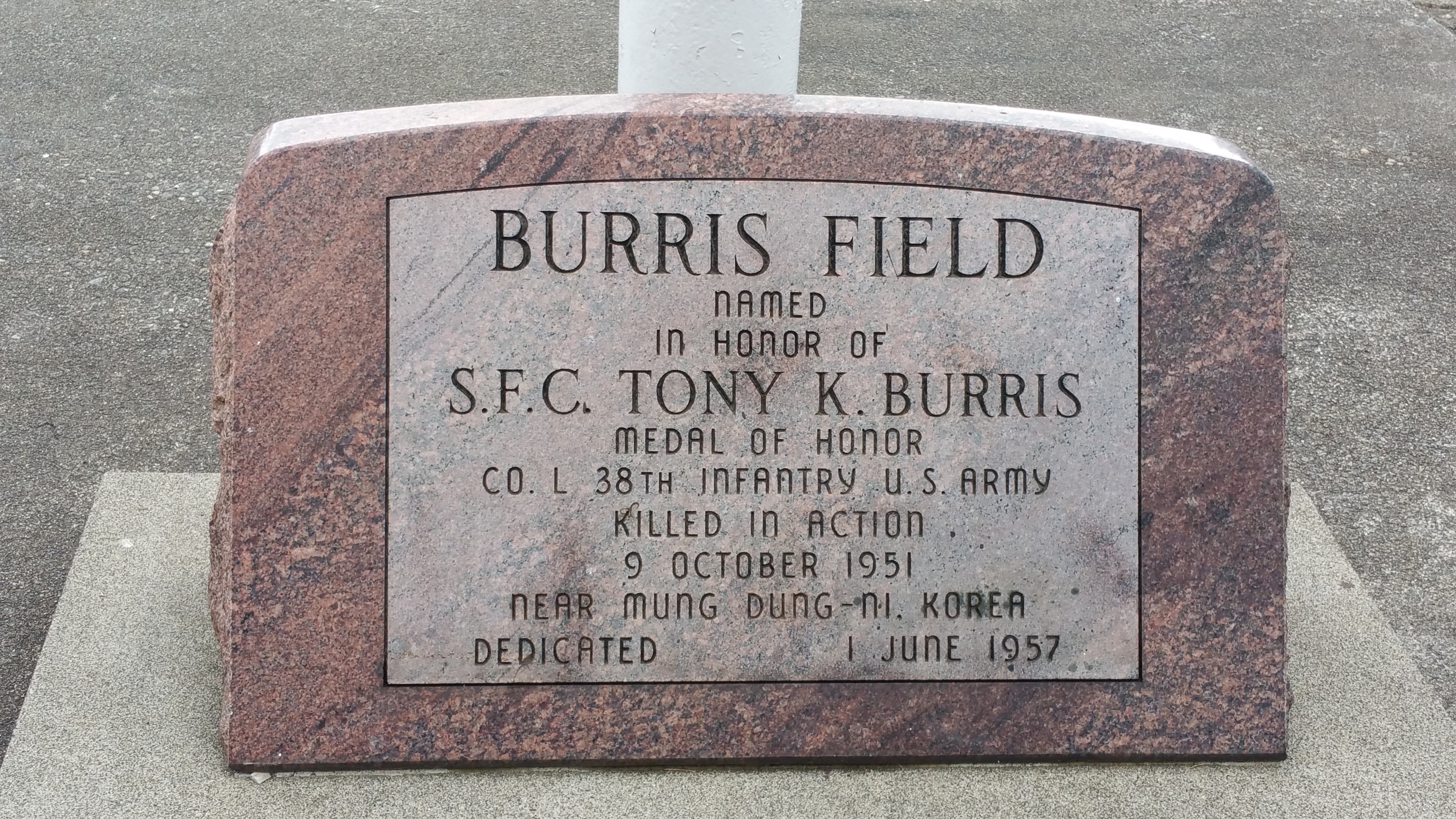
Burris Field at Fort Lewis was named in honor of Tony K. Burris.

Tony K. Burris
Rank and organization: Sergeant First Class, U.S. Army, Company L, 38th Infantry Regiment, 2nd Infantry Division
Place and date: vicinity of Mundung-ni, Korea 8–9 October 1951
Entered service at: Blanchard, Okla. Birth: Blanchard, Okla.
G.O. No.: 84, September 5, 1952.

Citation:

Sfc. Burris, a member of Company L, distinguished himself by conspicuous gallantry and outstanding courage above and beyond the call of duty. On 8 October, when his company encountered intense fire from an entrenched hostile force, Sfc. Burris charged forward alone, throwing grenades into the position and destroying approximately 15 of the enemy. On the following day, spearheading a renewed assault on enemy positions on the next ridge, he was wounded by machine gun fire but continued the assault, reaching the crest of the ridge ahead of his unit and sustaining a second wound. Calling for a 57mm. recoilless rifle team, he deliberately exposed himself to draw hostile fire and reveal the enemy position. The enemy machine gun emplacement was destroyed. The company then moved forward and prepared to assault other positions on the ridge line. Sfc. Burris, refusing evacuation and submitting only to emergency treatment, joined the unit in its renewed attack but fire from hostile emplacement halted the advance. Sfc. Burris rose to his feet, charged forward and destroyed the first emplacement with its heavy machine gun and crew of 6 men. Moving out to the next emplacement, and throwing his last grenade which destroyed this position, he fell mortally wounded by enemy fire. Inspired by his consummate gallantry, his comrades renewed a spirited assault which overran enemy positions and secured Hill 605, a strategic position in the battle for "Heartbreak Ridge", Sfc. Burris' indomitable fighting spirit, outstanding heroism, and gallant self-sacrifice reflect the highest glory upon himself, the infantry and the U.S. Army.

== Awards and decorations ==
Burris's awards include:

Badge	Combat Infantryman Badge		
1st row	Medal of Honor		Silver Star
2nd row	Purple Heart	Army Good Conduct Medal	National Defense Service Medal
3rd row	Korean Service Medal with 2 Campaign stars	United Nations Service Medal Korea	Korean War Service Medal Retroactively Awarded, 2003
Unit awards	Presidential Unit Citation		Korean Presidential Unit Citation

== See also ==
- List of Korean War Medal of Honor recipients
- List of Native American Medal of Honor recipients
