= Wataru Nakamura =

Medal of Honor recipient (1921–1951)

- Born: 20 November 1921; Los Angeles, California
- Died: 18 May 1951 (aged 29); P’ungch’on-ni, Korea
- Burial place: Evergreen Cemetery (Los Angeles)
- Military career
- Allegiance: United States of America
- Branch: United States Army
- Service years: 1944–1945; 1950–1951
- Rank: Private first class
- Units: Company I, 3rd Battalion, 38th Infantry Regiment; Company K, 442nd Infantry Regiment
- Conflicts: World War II; Korean War: Battle of the Soyang River †
- Awards: Medal of Honor; Purple Heart; Army Good Conduct Medal; World War II Victory Medal; National Defense Service Medal; Korean Service Medal; United Nations Service Medal Korea; Korean War Service Medal

Wataru Nakamura (Japanese: 中村 亘, 20 November 1921 – 18 May 1951) was a United States Army soldier who was posthumously awarded the Medal of Honor on 3 January 2025 for his actions during the Battle of the Soyang River in the Korean War.

== Early life ==
Wataru Nakamura was born on 20 November 1921, in Los Angeles, California, the second of seven children. After graduation from Thomas Jefferson High School, he went to San Francisco to work at a relative’s business to help support his family. When Executive Order 9066 was signed in 1942, which required Japanese Americans to live in internment camps, he rejoined his family, who were assigned to a relocation center in Rohwer, Arkansas.

== Military career ==
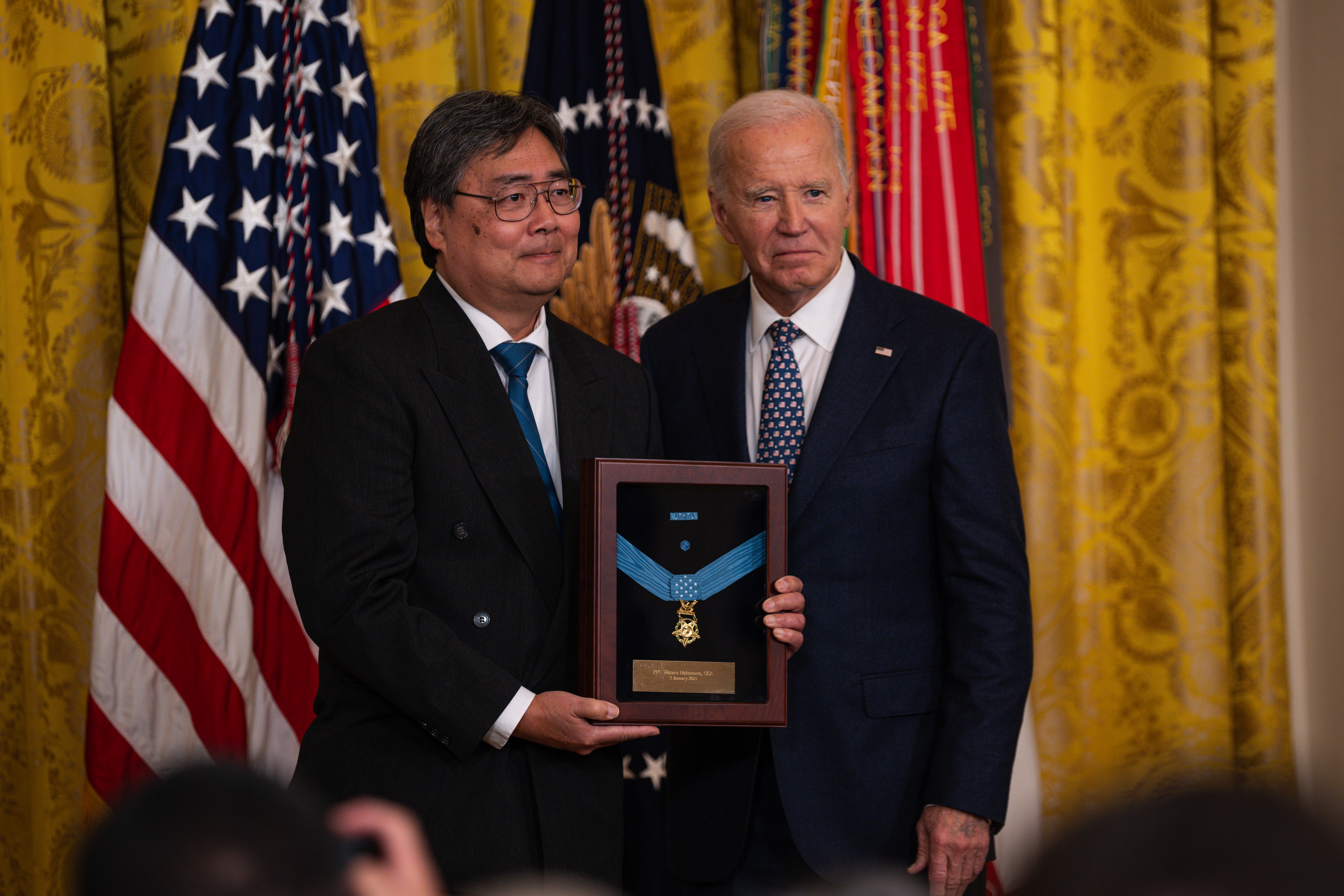
President Joe Biden with Gary Takashima, who received the Medal of Honor for former U.S. Army Pfc. Wataru Nakamura

He enlisted in the U.S. Army in 1944. He was sent to Europe to serve with Company K, 442nd Infantry Regiment. After being discharged, he lived in Chicago, Illinois, until he was called back to active duty in 1950.

In May 1951, he was serving with Company I, 3rd Battalion, 38th Infantry Regiment, 2nd Infantry Division, in South Korea. At approximately 04:30 on 18 May 1951, Nakamura volunteered to check and repair a damaged communications line. Unaware that the enemy had infiltrated and captured heavily fortified friendly positions, he moved forward until he came under a withering hail of hostile fire. Disregarding his safety, he made a one-man assault, destroying a machine-gun and its crew with his carbine and bayonet and destroying two other enemy positions with grenades. When his ammunition was expended, he was forced to withdraw in the face of overwhelming odds. After falling back, he met a carrying party, briefed the officer in charge, replenished his ammunition and returned to engage the hostile force. Supported by rifle fire, he wiped out an enemy position and attacked the remaining bunker, killing one and wounding another enemy soldier before he was mortally wounded.

He was originally awarded the Distinguished Service Cross, which was upgraded to the Medal of Honor on 3 January 2025.

== Medal of Honor citation ==

The President of the United States of America, authorized by Act of Congress, March 3, 1863, has awarded in the name of Congress the Medal of Honor to

PRIVATE FIRST CLASS
WATARU NAKAMURA
UNITED STATES ARMY

For conspicuous gallantry and intrepidity at the risk of his life above and beyond the call of duty:

Private First Class Wataru Nakamura distinguished himself by acts of gallantry and intrepidity above and beyond the call of duty, while serving with Company I, 38th Infantry Regiment, 2nd Infantry Division, in the vicinity of P’ungch’on-ni, Korea on May 18, 1951. Around daybreak, Nakamura volunteered to check and repair a communications line between his platoon and the command post. As he made his way along the line, he was brought under fire from an enemy force that had surrounded friendly positions and were threatening to break the company defense lines. Immediately, without regard for his own safety and without waiting for help, Nakamura rushed the enemy with a fixed bayonet and single-handedly destroyed a hostile machine gun nest and drove the enemy from several bunkers they had captured. When his ammunition was depleted, he withdrew under intense enemy fire. He then met an ammunition party ascending the hill. After quickly briefing the officer in charge, Nakamura rearmed himself and returned to the fight. In a fierce charge, he killed three of the enemy in one bunker, then killed and seriously wounded another in the last enemy-held bunker. Continuing to press the attack, he was mortally wounded by an enemy grenade. Nakamura’s extraordinary heroism and selflessness above and beyond the call of duty were in keeping with the highest traditions of military service and reflect great credit upon himself, his unit and the United States Army.

== Honors and awards ==

Badge	Combat Infantryman Badge		
1st row	Medal of Honor	Bronze Star Medal	Purple Heart
2nd row	Army Good Conduct Medal	American Campaign Medal	European–African–Middle Eastern Campaign Medal with 3 Campaign stars
3rd row	World War II Victory Medal	Army of Occupation Medal with 'Germany' clasp	National Defense Service Medal
4th row	Korean Service Medal with 3 Campaign stars	United Nations Service Medal Korea	Korean War Service Medal
Unit awards	Presidential Unit Citation		Korean Presidential Unit Citation

== See also ==
- List of Korean War Medal of Honor recipients
