= 38th Infantry Regiment (United States) =

- Coat of arms of the 38th Infantry Regiment
- Active: 1917-present
- Country: United States
- Branch: United States Army
- Type: Infantry
- Nickname: Rock of the Marne (special designation)
- Engagements: World War I World War II; Korean War; Iraq War; War in Afghanistan

Commanders
- Battalion Commander: LTC Jonathan C. Patten
- Command Sergeant Major: CSM Kyle McKelvey
- Notable commanders: Henry C. Merriam; Ulysses G. McAlexander; Olinto M. Barsanti

Insignia
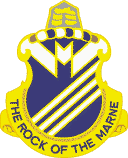
- Distinctive unit insignia

The 38th Infantry Regiment ("Rock of the Marne") is a United States Army infantry regiment. It should not be confused with the 38th United States Colored Infantry Regiment, which is a different unit.

== Organization of the Regiment ==
The 38th Infantry was first established on 28 July 1866, as part of the Regular Army, one of six segregated, all-black regiments (with white officers) created following the Civil War. It was organized on 1 October of that year at Jefferson Barracks, Missouri, and was stationed in New Mexico Territory and along the transcontinental railroads then under construction. Cathay Williams, the first recorded African American female to serve in the U.S. Army, served with the 38th during this time, disguised as a male. On 15 March 1869, the 38th was consolidated with the 41st Infantry Regiment and redesignated as the 24th Infantry Regiment.

== Current 38th Infantry Regiment ==
=== World War I ===
The current 38th Infantry Regiment was constituted in the Regular Army on 15 May 1917, and was organized on 1 June 1917 at Syracuse, New York. It was assigned 1 October 1917 to the 3rd Infantry Division. It saw service in France during the Second Battle of the Marne (Battle of Château-Thierry); 15 July 1918, its first day of participation in the battle, was later chosen as the regiment's "organization day."

=== Interwar period ===
The regiment arrived at the port of New York on 20 August 1919 on the troopship USS Matsonia and was transferred the same day to Camp Merritt, New Jersey, where emergency period personnel were discharged from the service. It was transferred on 23 August 1919 to Camp Pike, Arkansas, and was transferred on 16 September 1921 to Camp Lewis, Washington. The regiment, less the 1st Battalion, was transferred on 6 June 1922 to Fort Douglas, Utah. Concurrently, the 1st Battalion was transferred to Fort Logan, Colorado. The 1st Battalion was transferred in June 1927 to Fort Sill, Oklahoma. In April 1933, the regiment assumed command and control of the Fort Douglas Civilian Conservation Corps District. The 1st Battalion was inactivated on 1 October 1933 at Fort Sill, with the personnel and equipment transferred to the 3rd Battalion, 29th Infantry Regiment. The 1st Battalion was reactivated on 1 May 1939 at Fort Sill. The regiment was relieved from the 3rd Division on 12 October 1939 and assigned to the 2nd Infantry Division, being transferred on 9 November 1939 to Camp Bullis, Texas, and to Fort Sam Houston, Texas, on 24 February 1941.

=== World War II ===
The 38th Regiment would continue to serve as part of the 2nd Infantry Division. Leaving Fort Houston in October 1942, the Regiment would spend much of the early years of the war operating out of Camp McCoy, Wisconsin. In September 1943 the division as a whole was sent to Camp Shanks as part of the New York Port of Embarkation where the 38th Regiment would ship out to Belfast, Northern Ireland in October 1943. Eventually after transferring to Wales, on June 7, 1944, the 38th, along with most of the 2nd Infantry Division landed at Omaha Beach in Normandy on D-Day +1. They would got into heavy action near the village of Trévières on the 10th of June. The 38th would see heavy action throughout the Normandy Campaign, most notably at Hill 192 to the Northeast of the City of Saint-Lo. Eventually by late August 1944, the regiment was the center force of the 2nd Infantry Division's drive on the Fortress city of Brest in Brittany with heavy street fighting encountered until the city's fall in early September 1944. After a period of rest, the regiment was transferred to the Ardennes region of Belgium in October 1944, where limited operations would be encounter here east of the town of St.Vith against the fortified positions of the Siegfried Line, most notably in The Battle of Heartbreak Crossroads. On December 16, 1944, much of the 38th Regiment was attacked as part of the opening phase of the Battle of the Bulge, thanks to their efforts in holding the twin villages of Krinkelt and Rocherath, they would allow much of the 2nd and 99th Infantry Divisions to fall back to more defensible positions on the strategic high ground of the Elsenborn Ridge, which they would also hold for most of December 1944 into January 1945. In February 1945, the regiment would take part in the push into the Rhineland region of Germany, eventually crossing the Rhine River via the Remagen Bridgehead on March 10, 1945. Racing across central Germany in April 1945, by the 18th, after a series of intense street engagements, the 38th would help secure the vital city of Leipzig, Germany. By the 24th, the regiment had reached the western bank of the Mulde River, not to long after that contact would be made with the Soviets on the eastern bank. Eventually after being relieved from its duties on the Mulde River, the regiment and entire 2nd Division was moved town to the Germany town of Waldmünchen along the Czechoslovak-German border, where the 38th Regiment would take part in the last major offensive operation of the U.S. Army in Europe in WWII with a major push towards the Czech city of Plzeň, the 38th being in the 2nd Division's lead. The attack began on the 4th of May 1945, and by May 8, with the assistance of the 16th Armored Division and 97th Infantry Division much of the city of Pilsen had been cleared by the 38th when the official word of Nazi Germany's surrender was announced. The Regiment would remain on Occupation Duty around Pilsen until July 1945, when they were shipped back to the U.S. for training for the Invasion of Japan but lucky the war in the Pacific ended before any major training could begin.

=== Korean War ===
Six members of the 38th Infantry were awarded the Medal of Honor for their actions in the Korean War:

- First Lieutenant Frederick F. Henry, Company F, for actions on 1 September 1950
- Private first class Wataru Nakamura, Company I, posthumously for actions on 18 May 1951, awarded on 3 January 2025
- Sergeant First Class Tony K. Burris, Company L, for actions on 8–9 October 1951
- Sergeant Charles R. Long, Company M, for actions on 12 February 1951
- Corporal Ronald E. Rosser, Heavy Mortar Company, for actions on 12 January 1952
- Private Miguel Vera, Company F, for actions on 21 September 1952

=== Cold War ===
- Redesignated 8 November 1957 as Headquarters and Headquarters Company, 1st Battle Group, 38th Infantry, and relieved from assignment to the 2d Infantry Division
- Inactivated 4 March 1958
- Organic elements constituted 26 January 1962
- Battle Group assigned 19 February 1962 to the 2d Infantry Division and activated at Fort Benning, Georgia
- Reorganized and redesigned 10 May 1963 as the 1st Battalion, 38th Infantry
- By 1972, the 1st Battalion was assigned to the 2nd Infantry Division's 2nd Brigade at Camp Hovey, South Korea.
- Inactivated 16 December 1986 in South Korea and relieved from assignment to the 2d Infantry Division
- Headquarters transferred 28 August 1987 to the United States Army Training and Doctrine Command and activated at Fort Benning, Georgia

=== Modern ===
- Battalion redesignated 1 October 2005 as the 1st Battalion, 38th Infantry Regiment
- Headquarters inactivated 27 April 2006 at Fort Benning, Georgia, and withdrawn from the United States Army Training and Doctrine Command
- Battalion assigned 1 June 2006 to the 4th Brigade Combat Team, 2d Infantry Division, and activated at Fort Lewis, Washington and Battalion inactivated 16 March 2014
- Battalion assigned 17 March 2014 to the 1st Stryker Brigade Combat Team, 4th Infantry Division, and activated at Fort Carson, Colorado

== Campaign participation credit ==
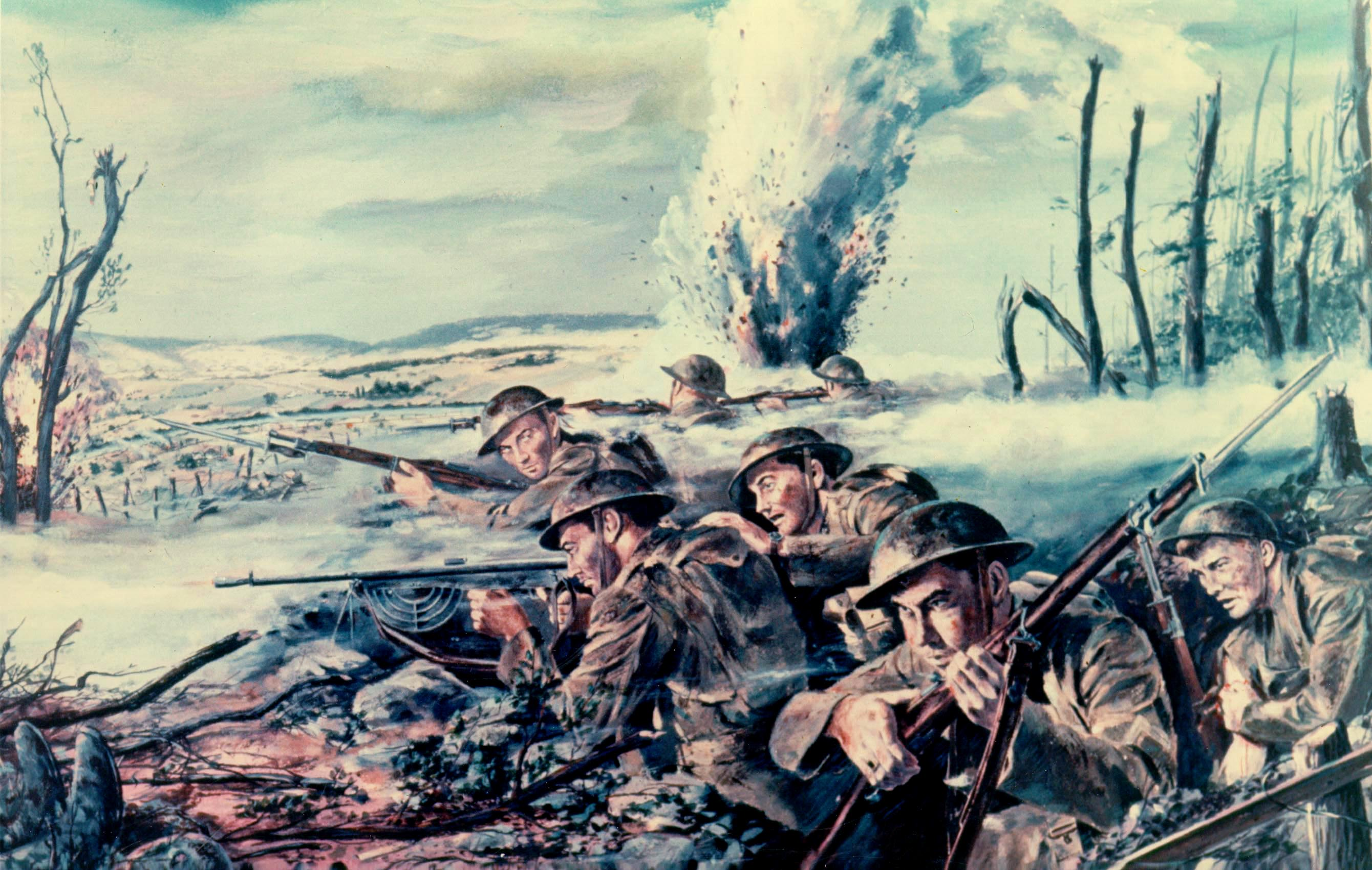
During Second Battle of the Marne, 38th Infantry Regiment repelled the German attack near Mézy, France, across the Marne River in July 1918. This defense checked the Germans' assault and made an Allied offensive possible, thus earning 3rd Infantry Division's nickname "Rock of the Marne".

- World War I : Aisne; Champagne-Marne; Aisne-Marne; St. Mihiel; Meuse-Argonne; Champagne 1918
- World War II: Normandy; Northern France; Rhineland; Ardennes-Alsace; Central Europe
- Korean War: UN Defensive; UN Offensive; CCF Intervention; First UN Counteroffensive; CCF Spring Offensive; UN Summer-Fall Offensive; Second Korean Winter; Korea, Summer-Fall 1952; Third Korean Winter; Korea, Summer 1953
- Operation Iraqi Freedom : OIF V, Served in Baghdad and Baqouba
- Operation Iraqi Freedom : OIF VII, Abu Ghraib
- Operation Enduring Freedom: OEF '12-'13, Panjwai Valley
- Operation Freedom Sentinel:OFS 2018–2019
- Operation Inherent Resolve:OIR 2021–2022

== Decorations ==
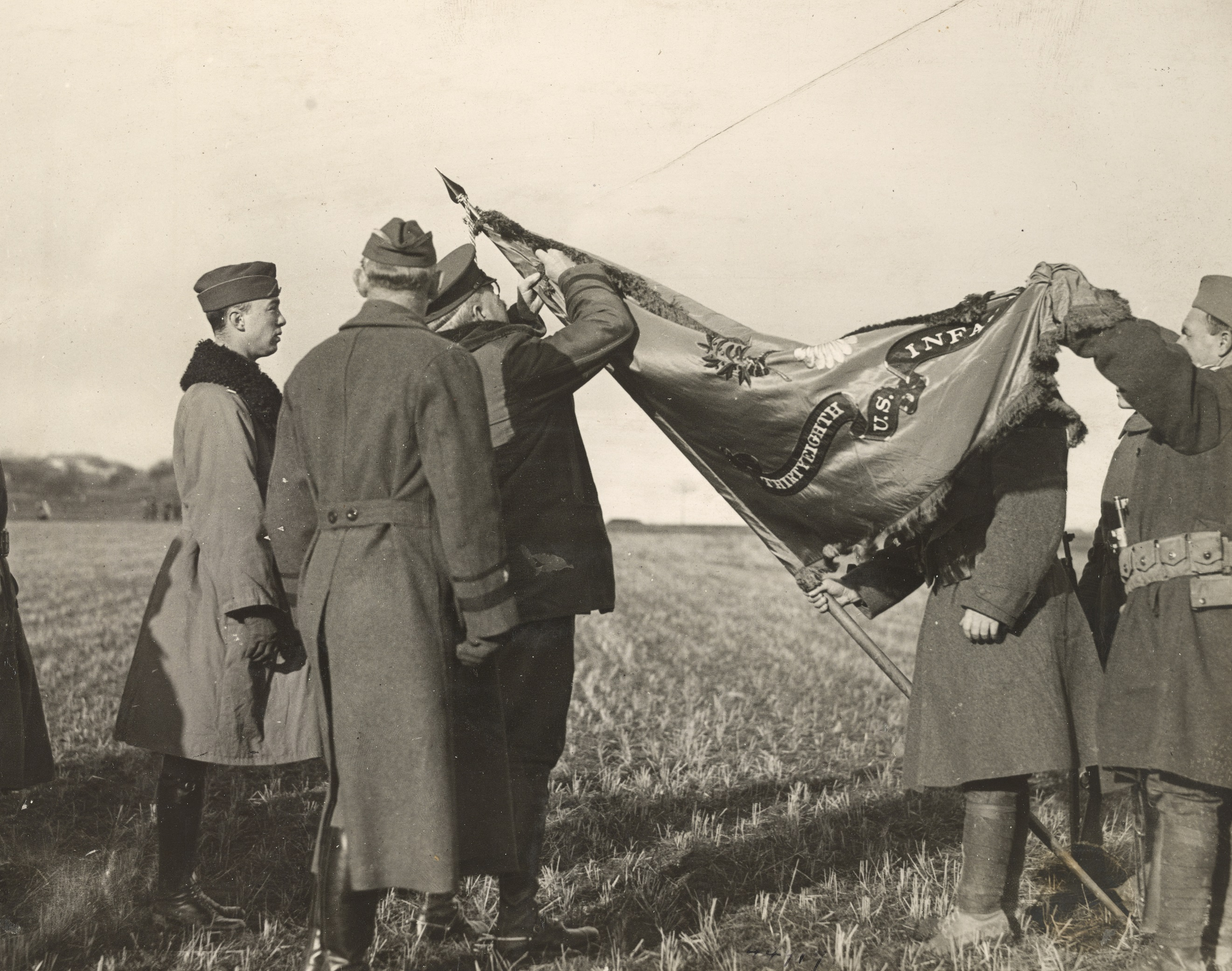
General Joseph Dickman pins the French Croix de Guerre to the 38th flag in 1919

- French Croix de Guerre with Palm, World War I for MARNE RIVER
- French Croix de Guerre with Silver-Gilt Star, World War II for BREST
- Belgian Fourragere 1940
- Cited in the Order of the Day of the Belgian Army for action in the Ardennes
- Cited in the Order of the Day of the Belgian Army for action at Elsenborn Crest

=== Unit Decorations ===
Ribbon	Award	Year	Notes
	Presidential Unit Citation (Army)	08/22/1944–08/23/1944	for service for HILL 154, BREST
	Presidential Unit Citation (Army)	12/10/1944–12/20/1944	for service for KRINKELT
	Presidential Unit Citation (Army)	05/16/1951–06/02/1951	for service for HONGCHON
	Republic of Korea Presidential Unit Citation (Army)	1950	for service for NAKTON RIVER LINE
	Republic of Korea Presidential Unit Citation (Army)	1950–1952	for service in Korea
	Republic of Korea Presidential Unit Citation (Army)	1950–1953	for service in Korea
	Meritorious Unit Commendation (Army)	4/2007–6/2008	for service in Operation Iraqi Freedom
	Meritorious Unit Commendation (Army)	09/2009–09/2010	for service in Operation Iraqi Freedom
	Meritorious Unit Commendation (Army)	11/24/2012–07/25/2013	for service in Operation Enduring Freedom
	Meritorious Unit Commendation (Army)	04/2018–02/2019	For Service in Operation Freedom Sentinel
