= Third Battle of Wonju =

Battle of the Korean War

- Part of the Korean War
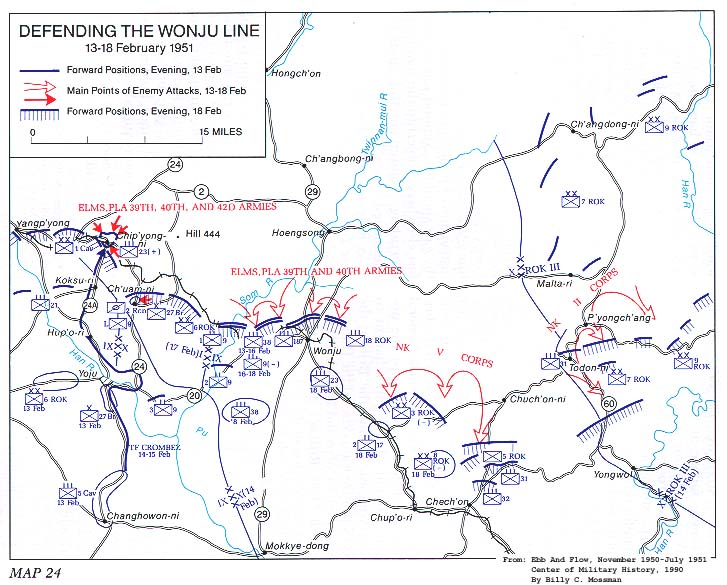
- Wonju line map
Date	13–18 February 1951
Location	Wonju, South Korea
Result	United Nations victory

Belligerents
United Nations (UNC): South Korea; United States	China; North Korea

Commanders and leaders
(United Nations) Douglas MacArthur (United States) Matthew B. Ridgway (United States) Edward Almond (First Republic of Korea) Yu Jae-hung	(China) Peng Dehuai (North Korea) Kim Ung

Units involved
(First Republic of Korea) III Corps (United States) X Corps	(North Korea) II Corps; V Corps (China) 120th Division; 117th Division

The Third Battle of Wonju, was a series of engagements between North Korean and United Nations (UN) forces during the Korean War. The battle took place from 13 to 18 February 1951 north of the South Korean town of Wonju.

While the Korean People's Army (KPA) achieved some initial successes, their attacks petered out in the face of strong UN defences and as their supply lines became overstretched and by 18 February they had begun to withdraw across the entire front.

== Background ==
As UN forces reeled under the attack on Hoengsong by the People's Volunteer Army (PVA) XIII Army Group and KPA V Corps, on 12 February U.S. X Corps commander General Edward Almond met with Eighth Army commander General Matthew Ridgway and advised him that he planned to give up Hoengsong and defend Wonju. His formal order issued late in the day called for the US 2nd Infantry Division, with the 187th Airborne Regimental Combat Team attached, to defend a long line which from an anchor on the west at Chip’yong-ni stretched out to the southeast and east, passing 2 miles (3.2 km) north of Wonju and continuing 9 miles (14 km) beyond the town. In the right portion of the Corps' sector, the Republic of Korea Army (ROKA) 3rd and 5th Infantry Divisions were to stand between Route 29 and the Corps' east boundary some 7 miles (11 km) farther north. Placing the South Koreans on this forward line would tie the X Corps to the left of the ROKA III Corps, whose line now bulged out to the north far beyond the X Corps front. To back up the South Koreans and secure the Corps' east flank in depth, the 31st Infantry Regiment of General Ferenbaugh’s 7th Infantry Division was to occupy positions at Todon-ni, a road junction 4 miles (6.4 km) below Pyongchang. Ferenbaugh's 32nd Infantry Regiment, still holding positions between Chech’on and Yongwol, would lend further depth, and the 17th Infantry Regiment, now scheduled to assemble in Corps' reserve near Wonju, could be committed to help. To improve control, Almond requested that the ROKA I Corps headquarters be attached to X Corps to take charge of the ROKA 3rd and 5th Divisions. General Kim Hong-il and his staff, by virtue of past service under Almond in northeastern Korea, were experienced in joint operations and were well acquainted with the X Corps staff. Ridgway approved, he arranged to have Kim and a partial staff flown into the X Corps' sector on the 13th and to have Kim's remaining staff follow by truck. The ROKA Capital Division, in the meantime, was to pass to ROK III Corps control.

== Battle ==
Along the northwestern portion of the Wonju defenses, just inside the corner position of the 1st Battalion, 9th Infantry Regiment, PVA coming out of the Hoengsong area meanwhile hit the 38th Infantry Regiment. The assaults forced a short withdrawal by the attached Netherlands Battalion on the 38th's left and penetrated the 3rd Battalion on the regimental right, but counterattacks restored the lost ground before noon. Captives identified the force moving on Wonju to be in division strength and to comprise two regiments of the PVA 120th Division and one of the 117th Division. The bulk of this force was sighted from the air moving in several columns across the Som River northwest of Wonju. Taken and kept under air and massed artillery attack, the PVA at first ignored losses and continued toward Wonju. But as casualties mounted the Chinese faltered, and most turned southwest before reaching the Wonju defenses. By 15:00 the air strikes and artillery fire stopped the PVA movement altogether.

The ROKA 3rd and 5th Infantry Divisions, ordered by Almond on the 13th to withdraw into positions between Wonju and Pyongchang, continued to withdraw on the 14th somewhat below that line. KPA V Corps forces caught up with both divisions during the afternoon of the 14th and briefly engaged each. The 3rd, missing its 18th Regiment and otherwise hurt by casualties, nevertheless managed to put up fair defenses slightly southeast of Wonju and 12 miles (19 km) above Chech’on. But the 5th, next east, became even more disorganized as it withdrew and at dark on the 14th was still assembling around Chuch’on-ni, 10 miles (16 km) above Chech'on. Its artillery was intact, but it had lost half its other crew-served weapons and could muster only the equivalent of four infantry battalions. This left the division scarcely fit to establish defenses before Chech'on, let alone send a regiment northeast to Malta-ri (37.4327°N 128.376°E), as Almond had directed, to help tie the X Corps line to the extended position of the ROKA III Corps.

Left with a 20 miles (32 km) west flank neither tied to the X Corps nor solidly manned, and feeling some pressure on this flank from KPA II Corps forces, especially at Malta-ri, Yu ordered the ROKA 7th and 9th Infantry Divisions at the left and center of the ROKA III Corps sector to withdraw near noon on the 14th. The 7th Division moved toward positions adjacent to Ferenbaugh's 31st Infantry Regiment below Pyongchang, the 9th Division toward positions at the 7th Division's right.

Ridgway earlier had recognized that the enemy attacks in the X Corps' sector and the X Corps' withdrawals might compel some adjustment of the ROKA III Corps position. Preempting to a degree the authority he had given Almond to coordinate ROK III Corps movements during Operation Roundup, Ridgway on the 12th permitted General Yu Jae-hung to halt the ROKA III Corps' advance pending the outcome of the attack against Almond's forces. On the 13th, after X Corps had pulled back some 15 miles (24 km), he authorized Yu to withdraw his three divisions into defenses along a general southwest-northeast line between Pyongchang and Gangneung on the coast. Ridgway intended that Yu withdraw only as a result of enemy pressure and then only in a well-fought delaying action, whereas Yu's order on the 14th appeared to be an unnecessary surrender of east shoulder territory. To prevent future ROKA withdrawals that did not punish and delay enemy forces, Ridgway directed the Korean Military Advisory Group (KMAG) chief, General Francis William Farrell, to make a habit of posting himself with major ROKA units when they were withdrawing and to ensure personally that they stayed in contact. In response to the latest ROKA III Corps move, he flashed a reminder to Yu on the 15th that any general withdrawal not forced by enemy pressure violated standing instructions. Yu received the admonition in time to hold the bulk of the 9th Division generally in its original position. However the 7th Division and 30th Regiment of the 9th had completed their withdrawals, the regiments of the 7th Division standing along Route 60 from a point 6 miles (9.7 km) above Yongwol north to Pyongchang, the 30th Regiment extending the line to the northeast. Since KPA II Corps forces from the 9th and 27th Divisions were then approaching Pyongchang from the northwest, Yu attached the 30th Regiment to the 7th Division and left the force where it was.

The ostensible aim of the KPA moving on Pyongchang was to drive Yu's forces out of the town and back from Route 60, thereby opening the road for a strike south against Yongwol. From late afternoon on 15 February through early morning on the 18th, the 9th and 27th Divisions launched repeated company and battalion assaults, seized Pyongchang itself, and, in their best effort, drove down Route 60 within 8 miles (13 km) of Yongwol. On the 16th, after it was clear that Yu would not be able to return the ROKA 7th Division and 30th Regiment to their former positions to the north, Ridgway allowed him to pull the remaining ROKA III Corps units to the Pyongchang-Gangneung line and gave him specific instructions to stand fast in the Pyongchang area and keep the KPA out of Yongwol. Yu consequently placed a second regiment in the Pyongchang area as he brought the rest of his forces south. The KPA units, still worn from previous operations, could not sustain their drive against the strong South Korean position, lost most of their gains to ROKA counterattacks, and finally withdrew. By evening of the 18th Yu's line units were reporting no contact.

In the adjacent X Corps sector KPA V Corps forces pushed toward Chech'on on 15 February, hitting hard at the 22d Regiment in the right half of the ROKA 3rd Division's sector. The regiment gave way some on the east but with fire support from 7th Division artillery near Chech'on otherwise stood its ground. With no serious results, a few KPA reached Chuch'onni to the southeast and briefly fired on the ROKA 5th Division, which was still assembling straggling forces and feebly attempting to establish defenses centered on the town.

Under the arrangements made on 12 February by Almond and Ridgway, the ROKA I Corps headquarters took control of the ROKA 3rd, 5th, and 8th Divisions at 14:00 on the 15th. Almond directed Kim, the ROKA I Corps' commander, to defend the Wonju-Pyongchang line, a large order given the debilitated condition of the 5th and 8th Divisions and the presence of KPA forces below that line. Because of the current threat to Chech'on, Kim's initial act was to form a provisional battalion from the remnants of the 8th Division as Corps reserve, which he assembled north of Chup'o-ri behind a 2 miles (3.2 km) gap between the two forward divisions.

Additional KPA V Corps forces from the 6th, 7th and 12th Divisions meanwhile massed in front of the ROKA I Corps and early on the 16th opened strong assaults against both forward divisions. The ROKA 3rd Division, after the 22nd Regiment on the right lost some ground, contained the attack in its sector; but the 5th Division, having been able to organize only fragile positions at Chuch’on-ni, withdrew after KPA forces penetrated the 36th Regiment on the division left. KMAG advisors with the 5th Division and ROKA I Corps' headquarters notified Almond that the division's units were not being hit especially hard, but were being outmaneuvered and in the process were disintegrating. Before the KPA attack diminished in the evening, the division had fallen back five miles and, in the judgment of the KMAG advisors, was no longer to be counted as an effective force.

To ease the danger to Chech'on, only 5 miles (8.0 km) behind the ROKA 5th Division, Almond directed Ferenbaugh's 7th Infantry Division to move the 31st Infantry Regiment from the Pyongchang area, where the ROKA 7th Division was holding its own, to a position behind the 5th Division. While the KPA threat remained potentially serious, the 31st Regiment in its new position and the 32nd Infantry Regiment in and around Chech'on itself considerably increased Almond's chances of holding the KPA out of the town and off the main X Corps supply route. Further improving the defense of Chech'on, the tail-end battalion of the 17th Infantry Regiment, which had been moving up Route 29 to the regimental assembly at Wonju, halted along the road behind the ROKA 3rd Division. In addition, Kim shaped another provisional battalion from ROKA 8th Division remnants and started it forward to assemble with the one he had formed the day before below the gap between the two forward divisions. That gap had opened to 3 miles (4.8 km) when the ROKA 5th Division withdrew.

An even wider gap of about 7 miles (11 km) had opened between the right of the ROKA 5th Division and the nearest ROKA III Corps position to the northeast. Although Yu's left flank forces were handling the KPA II Corps units attempting to push down Route 60 into Yongwol, the gap offered the KPA opposite the 5th Division an opportunity to sweep around Yu's flank. Yu, his leftmost forces well occupied and anyway obliged by Ridgway's orders of the 16th to stand fast in the Pyongchang area, could do nothing about filling the gap; neither could any of the weak ROKA divisions in the X Corps' sector. Ridgway on 17 February consequently directed Almond to push American troops northeast to clear out the KPA and establish firm contact with the ROKA III Corps. As Ridgway acted to cover the gap between Corps, it began to appear that the hard assaults on the ROKA 3rd and 5th Divisions on the 16th had spent the KPA V Corps.

== Aftermath ==
Although Almond, expecting a strong Chinese strike south of the Hoengsong, had emphasized the defense of Wonju, enemy forces made no concerted effort to seize the town after failing to do so on the 14th. Local skirmishes occurred along the Wonju front on the 15th, but on the 16th contact lightened and faded out.

Infiltration and assaults harassed both South Korean divisions on the 17th and 18th but failed to yield any permanent gain, and on the 18th even the weak ROKA 5th Division was able to make one short advance. As contact diminished on the 18th, a battalion from the 31st Infantry patrolled 5 miles (8.0 km) ahead of ROKA lines before encountering a KPA position. The KPA may have backed off only to reorganize for new attacks; but in light of what had taken place in the meantime along the X Corps’ west shoulder, their move was more likely part of a general withdrawal.

Following the defeat of the PVA at Chipyong-ni and the PVA/KPA on the Wonju line, it became apparent that the PVA/KPA forces were retiring from the salient they had created in the central region in the Chinese Fourth Phase Offensive. The withdrawal fit the pattern of PVA/KPA operations observed before, in which assault forces were obliged to pause for refitting after a week or so of battle. During the evening of 18 March Ridgway planned an advance designed to deny the PVA/KPA any respite in which to prepare new attacks and, in particular, designed to destroy those enemy forces moving north out of the Chech'on salient. He intended that two principal thrusts by American forces, up Route 29 from Wonju beyond Hoengsong and up Route 60 from Yongwol beyond Pyongchang, would block the main paths of PVA/KPA withdrawal. Other forces were to move through and clear the adjacent ground. Given the particular purpose of the attack, he called it Operation Killer.
