= Battle of Hoengsong =

1951 battle of the Korean War

Battle of Hoengseong
- Part of the Korean War
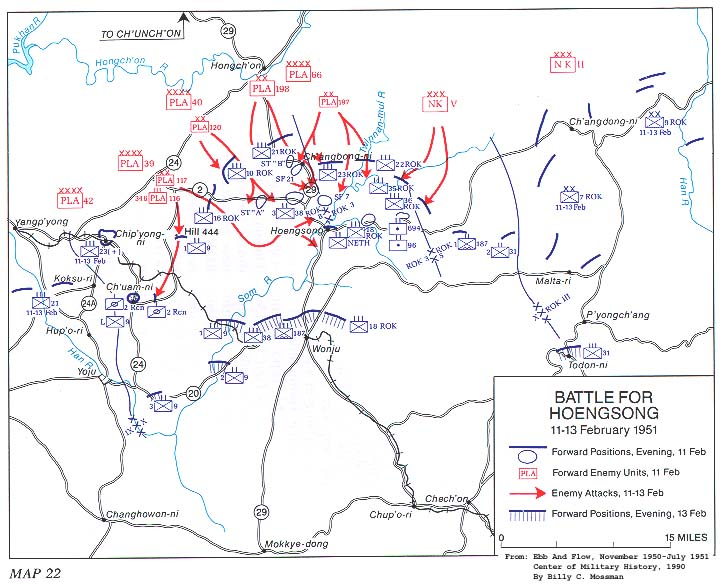
Date	11–13 February 1951
Location	Hoengseong, South Korea 37.490°N 127.988°E
Result	Chinese victory

Belligerents
United Nations: United States; South Korea; Netherlands	China; North Korea

Commanders and leaders
(United Nations) Douglas MacArthur (United States) Edward Almond (United States) Clark L. Ruffner (South Korea) Choi Yong-hee (Netherlands) M. P. A. den Ouden †	(China) Peng Dehuai (China) Li Tianyou

Units involved
(United States) X Corps: (First Republic of Korea) 3rd Infantry Division; (First Republic of Korea) 5th Infantry Division; (First Republic of Korea) 8th Infantry Division; (United States) 2nd Infantry Division; (United States) 7th Infantry Division; (United States) 187th Airborne Regimental Combat Team; (Netherlands) Regiment van Heutsz	(China) 13th Army: 39th Army; 40th Army; 66th Army; (North Korea) V Corps

Casualties and losses
ROK: 9,844 casualties US: 1,900 casualties including 461 killed Total: 11,862 casualties	4,141 casualties

The Battle of Hoengsong, also known as the Hoengsong counteroffensive (Chinese: 橫城反擊戰) was a battle during the Korean War that took place between 11 and 15 February 1951. It was part of the Chinese People's Volunteer Army (PVA) Fourth Phase Offensive and was fought between the PVA and United Nations forces. After being pushed back northward by the UN's Operation Thunderbolt counteroffensive, the PVA was victorious in this battle, inflicting heavy casualties on the UN forces in the two days of fighting and temporarily regaining the initiative.

The initial PVA assault fell on the Republic of Korea Army (ROKA) 8th Infantry Division which disintegrated after several hours of attacks by three PVA divisions. When the US armored and artillery forces supporting the 8th Division found their infantry screen evaporating, they began to withdraw down the single road through the twisting valley north of Hoengsong; but they were soon outflanked by PVA infiltrating cross-country. Hundreds of US soldiers were killed by PVA forces, which resulted in one of the most lopsided defeats suffered by the US military in the Korean War.

== Background ==
Given continued reports of eastward PVA shifts and taking them as clear signs of an imminent PVA offensive in the west-central region, Eighth Army commander General Matthew Ridgway late on February 11 instructed X Corps commander General Edward Almond to patrol but not to attempt further advances toward Route 24 in either the U.S. 2nd Infantry Division or ROKA 8th Infantry Division zones under Operation Roundup until U.S. IX Corps had reduced the PVA's Han River bridgehead below Yangp'yong. To move forward while IX Corps was still held up could isolate and overextend Almond's leftmost units in the area where the PVA 39th, 40th, 42nd and 66th Armies were obviously massing.

At the time Ridgway called Almond's leftmost units to a halt, he had in hand one of the better intelligence estimates prepared by his headquarters since he assumed command. Always seeking to improve intelligence, he had directed the preparation of this analysis, stipulating that it contains a survey of enemy strategic capabilities as well as tactical courses of action. Stimulating Ridgway's unusual demand for a strategic estimate at field army level was the yet unexplained lull in PVA offensive operations that had set in on January 4 after the Eighth Army gave up Seoul and that had now gone on for a month. The question was whether the lull represented a change in strategy from destroying UN forces to a new strategy of containing them, or was merely the result of logistical problems. Colonel Robert G. Fergusson, the acting intelligence officer who prepared the estimate, told Ridgway that the long lull was purely the consequence of Chinese resupply, transportation and reinforcement difficulties. The slogan repeatedly given in statements by Chinese government officials continued to be to drive UN forces out of Korea. Fergusson predicted that once the logistical problems were sufficiently relieved and that time appeared to be near the campaign to push the United Nations forces off the peninsula would be resumed with full acceptance of any further heavy personnel losses and supply problems that might occur.

The concentration of Chinese forces, Fergusson pointed out, was in the area bordered on the northwest by the Pukhan River and on the southeast by Route 24 between Yangp'yong and Hongcheon. From southwest to northeast, the concentration included the 42nd, 39th, 40th and 66th Armies, whose total strength was around 110,000. He was not sure that all of these units had completed their shifts to the west-central region. But with the enemy mass centering there, the most likely paths of the next enemy advance were down the Han River valley toward Yoju and down Route 29 toward Wonju, with both paths then turning toward the same deep objective, Ch'ungju. The advance might include deep sweeps to the southwest to envelop US I and IX Corps. Because the PVA's problem of resupply would progressively worsen as supply lines lengthened during an advance, Fergusson judged that a sustained PVA drive was unlikely. More probable was a series of shallow enveloping maneuvers interspersed with halts for reorganization and resupply. He believed that the Chinese would not open an offensive until major units of the IX Army Group moved down from the Wonsan area within reinforcing range. These, he estimated, could reach the central region no sooner than 15 February. Fergusson was wrong in considering the arrival of IX Army Group units as a necessary condition and so was in error on the nearest date of a Chinese attack. But in measuring all other probabilities, he came remarkably close.

== Battle ==
As predicted, the XIII Army Group commander opened an attack on the night of 11 February toward Hoengsong. In shifting forces eastward he had moved the 66th Army from Kapyong to Hongcheon, whence one division struck south along Route 29. From start points near Route 24 between Hongcheon and Chip'yong-ni, a division of the 40th Army and one of the 39th Army joined the push on Hoengsong by attacking southeast. In the path of these initial attacks lay the ROKA 8th Infantry Division.

=== Collapse of the ROKA 8th Infantry Division ===
Moving below Hongchon astride Route 29, the 198th Division, 66th Army, hit the front of the ROKA 21st Regiment about 20:30, then sent forces around the regiment's flanks, mainly on the west through the gap between the 21st and 10th Regiments. While the 198th swung behind the 21st, the 120th Division, 40th Army, penetrated the line of the 10th Regiment and the 117th Division, 39th Army, pushed through the left flank of the 16th Regiment. When word of the opening attack reached 8th Division headquarters in Hoengsong, division commander Brigadier general Choi Hong-hi ordered the 21st Regiment to make a short withdrawal and instructed Support Team B to move back down Route 29 and join Support Force 21 at Ch'angbongni. The armored team reached the artillery force about 22:00. Some of the 198th Division forces who had swept around the 21st Regiment meanwhile raced down both sides of Route 29, bypassed the American position at Ch'angbong-ni, and blocked the road near a bridge 3 miles (4.8 km) farther south. The 120th Division, about the same time, pushed through the 10th Regiment, some troops turning in behind both the 10th and 16th Regiments, others striking southeast toward the mountain road leading west from Route 29. Around midnight the latter overran the command posts of the 10th and 16th Regiments on the mountain road and cut off the ROKA 20th and 50th Field Artillery Battalions and Support Team A, also on the road, by establishing strong blocks between the support units and Route 29. Below the 120th, the 117th Division reinforced its frontal attack on the 16th Regiment and deepened its penetration of the regiment's left flank, sending forces eastward through the ground below the mountain road directly toward Hoengsong.

By 01:00 on 12 February, communications were out between 8th Division headquarters and all regiments as well as between each regiment and its subordinates. Boxed between frontal pressure and to the rear, the three regiments had started to withdraw; but with the main threads of control broken and the better routes of withdrawal blocked, units became separated and divided, and most were surrounded. The rearward move of those not trapped steadily disintegrated into individual efforts to escape. Members of the 21st Regiment straggled into the Support Force 21 perimeter at Ch'angbong-ni about 01:15. The support force commander, Lieutenant colonel John W. Keith, Jr., reported the ROKA withdrawal to Brigadier general Loyal M. Haynes, the 2nd Infantry Division artillery commander, and asked permission to withdraw a little over 3 miles (4.8 km) to a position he formerly had occupied just above the 3rd Battalion, 38th Infantry Regiment, at the junction of Route 29 and the mountain road leading west. He also requested that Haynes ask the 8th Division commander to stop the 21st Regiment's withdrawal until Keith got Support Force 21 and Support Team B in march order. Members of Keith's own infantry protection, Lieutenant colonel William P. Keleher's 1st Battalion, 38th Infantry, were at the time trying to collect the South Koreans and deploy them on the American perimeter, but with little success. Haynes contacted Choi, but Choi was no longer in communication with the 21st Regiment and was, besides, under the impression that the 21st was making only the short withdrawal he had called for earlier. He did nothing. Haynes meanwhile hesitated to clear Keith's withdrawal without 2nd Infantry Division commander General Clark L. Ruffner's approval. When he asked Ruffner he told him to check with the X Corps' artillery commander. As a matter of orders, and as an eventual matter of practice in controlling the artillery support forces, unity of command in Operation Roundup was vested in Corps' headquarters, not lower. The arrangement worked well enough during the advance. But after the Chinese engineered the collapse of the 8th Division, Corps' control inhibited the American commanders of support forces and of units on the line of departure in reacting rapidly. Delays and piecemeal movements among the smaller American units nevertheless colored the course of withdrawal operations.

In one instance, Captain Sherman D. Jones, the commander of Support Team A, scorned any need to get permission to withdraw and fought east over the blocked mountain road toward the 3rd Battalion, 38th Infantry. He withdrew a little after midnight amid uncontrolled ROKA vehicles, guns and troops and under heavy fire from Chinese small arms, machine guns, rocket launchers and mortars. The last A team troops to survive the move reached the 3rd Battalion, 38th Infantry, about dawn. Losses included two tanks, Jones, the tank platoon leader, and five others were wounded and nearly 150 men were missing. Similarly, few 8th Division troops found their way to safety. Most remained encircled in the mountains and were eventually killed or captured. On 13 February, after straggler lines were set and after Almond moved the division into Corps' reserve at Chup'o-ri, west of Chech'on, the division strength stood at 263 officers and slightly over 3,000 men, of whom about half were division service troops. Casualties, either dead or missing, stood at 323 officers (among them the commander and entire staff of the 10th Regiment, the executive officer of the 16th Regiment, seven battalion commanders and thirty company commanders) and 7,142 men. Division equipment losses included 14 artillery pieces, five antitank guns, 68 trucks, 249 radios, 87 mortars, 137 rocket launchers, 164 machine guns, 102 automatic rifles, 2,389 carbines and 4,096 rifles.

=== Support Force 21 ===
Earlier, as the 8th Division began to fall back after midnight on 11 February, the 66th Army commander widened his advance below Hongcheon, sending the 197th Division south through the ground 5 miles (8.0 km) east of Route 29 against the ROKA 3rd Infantry Division. In the mold of the attacks along and west of Route 29, infiltrating PVA attacked the command post of the 23rd Regiment and of one battalion of the 22nd after engaging the South Koreans with heavy frontal assaults. Before the PVA could get a trap fully set, the two regiments withdrew to a position about 3 miles (4.8 km) northeast of Hoengsong.

A group of about 300 soldiers of the 197th, thrust southwest toward Ch'angbong-ni during the attack and around 02:30 on the 12th hit Company A, 38th Infantry, holding the northeast sector of Support Force 21's perimeter. The company stood its ground but remained under fire. Though still waiting for permission to withdraw, Keith meanwhile began to put his artillery units in march order. Keith received clearance to move back about 02:45, an hour and a half after he asked for it, good time considering the route his request and its answer had taken. Haynes, after Ruffner instructed him to check with Corps, consulted Colonel William P. Ennis, the Corps' artillery commander, around 01:30. Ennis, in turn, spoke to Colonel William J. McCaffrey of the Corps' chief of staff's office, who asked Almond himself. Almond approved the withdrawal, and his word passed back from McCaffrey to Ennis to Haynes to Keith. Almond was under the impression, however, perhaps because of the several hands through which Keith's request had passed, that Support Force 21 would withdraw to Hoengsong, not just to a position near the 3rd Battalion, 38th Infantry.

Keith started his withdrawal at about 03:00. Ahead of the main body, two tanks and two squads of infantry from Support Team B moved to secure the bridge 3 miles (4.8 km) south, just above the area to be occupied, unaware that the Chinese had blocked Route 29 near the bridge and that they now had organized additional roadblocks above and below the crossing, the latter actually in the area Keith intended to occupy. PVA machine gunners overlooking Route 29 from the east harassed the tank-infantry team the moment it started south. The infantry hugged the tanks for protection, as did a group of ROKA troops trying to stay with the American force. A mile down the road, an explosion under the second tank brought 2nd Lieutenant William M. Mace, the platoon leader, out of the turret even as the tank, undamaged, continued to move. Machine gunfire from the left kept Mace from getting back inside, and a grenade, apparently thrown from the ditch on the east side of the road, then blew him off the tank, although without wounding him. His and the leading tank continued down the road, neither crew aware that Mace was no longer with them. The two tanks gradually outdistanced the infantry that had started with them but moved no more than another 1 mile (1.6 km) before the leading tank was hit by a rocket launcher round and ran off the steep edge of the road and overturned. The following tank attempted to pass but was hit in the engine compartment by a grenade or mortar round and capsized off the opposite side of the road. The two crews fled into the hills to the west, then turned south toward the 3rd Battalion, 38th Infantry. To the rear, following the same westward drift to escape fire coming in from the left of the road, Mace, the two infantry squads, and a number of South Koreans took cover in the ground on the right. The group moved south after daylight toward the 3rd Battalion, 38th Infantry, but became scattered during several small skirmishes with PVA forces. The survivors, including Mace, finally reached the 3rd Battalion around 09:30.

Behind the scattered tank-infantry team, Keith's main column received heavy small arms and machine-gun fire from the heights east of Route 29 while it formed and stretched out on the road below the support force perimeter. As Battery A of the 503rd Field Artillery Battalion, the leading artillery unit started to get its guns in column, a PVA raiding party dashed onto the road from the east, captured the battery commander, first sergeant, and several men, and took them back into the hills. PVA gunners meanwhile concentrated fire on vehicles, damaging many and killing or wounding several drivers. By 04:00 the Chinese had stopped Keith's column before it had actually got a full start. Infantry and artillery troops at the head of the column formed a line facing east along the road and returned fire while to the north Company A, assigned to be a rearguard, redeployed facing northwest, north, and northeast. PVA forces reengaged the company, but with help from the remaining two tanks of Support Team B, the rearguard troops kept the PVA from rolling up the column. Keith put some artillery pieces back in action near dawn and laid direct fire on the ridges to the east. Keleher then deployed two rifle companies, one into the heights on each side of the road, while troops on the road shoved disabled vehicles out of the way and rounded up replacements for missing drivers of others. Stubborn resistance slowed Keleher's infantry east of the road, but the support force was moving before 06:00.

At the tail of the column, Company A backed out of position just after the skies lightened but had to fight a running engagement with PVA who followed. As the company prepared to move, the commander, 1st Lieutenant George W. Gardner, saw three 155-mm howitzers attached to their M5 tractors, a full ammunition truck and several jeeps and trailers, all unattached, in a roadside paddy southwest of his position. Gardner's executive officer located at least one more howitzer, still in firing position. For reasons not clear, Battery A, 503rd Field Artillery Battalion, to whom the weapons and vehicles belonged, had withdrawn with only one howitzer. Gardner had no men who could drive the tractors and had neither time nor explosives to destroy them or the howitzers. Company A fought briefly from the artillery position, Gardner's men using the machine guns mounted on the artillery vehicles until the ammunition was gone, then left the wealth of weapons, artillery ammunition and vehicles to the Chinese. Gardner found the fifth howitzer on the road where Mace's two tanks had been knocked out and where the main body of the support force also had come under heavy mortar and machine gunfire. Among several vehicles disabled by the fire was the M5 tractor pulling the howitzer. Gardner's men had to manhandle the abandoned gun off the road to permit the two tanks with them to pass. The support force received more fire at the bridge, another mile south, and in the area just below the crossing where Keith had intended to redeploy. As Keith's column pushed through each fire block, PVA forces closed in on the road behind it and pressed hard against Gardner's rearguard. Keith, judging it impossible to establish positions as planned after coming under fire below the bridge, moved on to join the 3rd Battalion, 38th Infantry, not far beyond, and got the tail of the column inside the 3rd Battalion perimeter about 10:00. No careful muster was made, but support force casualties appeared to exceed 400. Company A had suffered the highest rate, losing two officers and around 110 men in its rearguard action. Keith, after discovering that five 155-mm howitzers and one 105-mm howitzer had been left behind, relayed a request to the division for airstrikes on the weapons.

=== Retreat to Hoengsong ===
The 3rd Battalion, 38th Infantry by the time Support Force 21 arrived, had been under fire and periodic assaults from the north and northwest for some five hours. After clearing with regimental commander Coughlin at his headquarters in Hoengsong (although Coughlin really had no authority over Support Force 21), 3rd Battalion commander Lieutenant colonel Harold Maixner deployed Keith's artillery and Keleher's infantry to strengthen the perimeter against the assaults, which were growing stronger. Withdrawing the combined force to Hoengsong was a logical alternative except that the 3rd Battalion remained under X Corps' orders to hold the Route 29-mountain road junction. A second situation now complicated a withdrawal to Hoengsong. By the time Keith and Keleher joined Maixner, those forces of the PVA 117th Division moving east below the mountain road reached Route 29 and blocked it between Hoengsong and the road junction 3 miles (4.8 km) north. Coughlin discovered the new roadblock when in response to a request from division artillery he sent the 38th's headquarters security platoon and a platoon from the regimental tank company north out of Hoengsong to help Support Force 21 get through the roadblocks below Ch'angbong-ni. The two platoons ran into the Chinese position 1 mile (1.6 km) above Hoengsong and withdrew after losing a tank and half the infantry. Coughlin placed mortar and artillery fire on the PVA position and called in airstrikes, the first reaching the target around 10:30. He also asked for the return of the 2nd Battalion from division reserve in Wonju with a view to sending it forward to clear the road, but Ruffner chose not to release it. Ruffner, at the same time, advised Coughlin to be ready to assume control of Support Force 21 and get it back to Hoengsong. Coughlin recommended that the 3rd Battalion also return whenever he received word to withdraw the support force, but his bid was futile. Denied use of the 2nd and 3rd Battalions, Coughlin faced the prospect of pulling the support force through the intervening roadblock without being able to do much more than he already had done to help. While he might have used the attached Netherlands Battalion, currently deployed along the northern limits of Hoengsong, it was the main security force for the headquarters and artillery installations in and below the town. In any case, Coughlin was under the impression that changes in the Netherlands' assignment could come only from Corps.

Around 11:00 2nd Division headquarters received instructions from Almond to reconstitute the 38th Infantry as a regimental combat team with the 2nd and 3rd Battalions remaining in place until further orders. Almond lifted the restriction on the 2nd Battalion not long after, but Ruffner then took direct control of the unit. He alerted the battalion to be prepared to block a PVA force, apparently from the 117th Division, observed earlier 2 miles (3.2 km) southwest of Hoengsong. In transmitting Almond's reconstitution order to the forces at the road junction, Ruffner directed Support Force 21 to withdraw to Hoengsong. Coughlin was to control the withdrawal, but with his use of the 2nd and 3rd Battalions still restricted, he was too weak to help the support force. Almond meanwhile learned of his misconception about Keith's movement when he asked his artillery officer, Ennis, for the current locations of both Support Force 21 and Support Force 7. The latter, Ennis reported, was 3 miles (4.8 km) north of Hoengsong and 1.5 miles (2.4 km) east of Route 29 in the initial position taken to support the ROKA 3rd Infantry Division. Unaware that Ruffner had just ordered Keith to continue his withdrawal, Ennis explained that Keith's force had joined the 3rd Battalion, 38th Infantry. Almond ordered both support forces to withdraw to Hoengsong immediately, fighting their way out if necessary. Ennis relayed the order through artillery channels around noon. The prescience of Almond's order to Support Force 7 became clear in the afternoon. Earlier, sometime around 09:00, the ROKA 3rd Infantry Division had tried to advance against the PVA 197th Division but moved only a short distance before being hit hard by the PVA. By 13:00 both forward regiments of the 3rd Division were under attack, one surrounded. Both began to fight back toward Hoengsong. To the 3rd Division's right, the ROKA 5th Infantry Division also started northeast during the morning toward its objectives near the Corps' boundary. But the assault regiments ran into hard counterattacks by the Korean People's Army (KPA) V Corps, which now appeared to be joining the advance on Hoengsong, and by early afternoon were withdrawing to escape being enveloped. With both ROKA divisions falling back east of Route 29, their supporting artillery potentially faced a situation similar to that of Support Force 21.

Lieutenant colonel Barney D. White, the Support Force 7 commander, decided against withdrawing over the route he had used to reach his current position since it led west to the bridge on Route 29 where Keith's forces had come under fire. White had sent a reconnaissance party west to investigate, and it had been ambushed even before it reached the bridge. He notified Corps' headquarters that he would move due east to the Twinnan-mul River, which flowed southwest past the northern edge of Hoengsong, then follow a primitive road through the Twinnanmul valley. The little-used road was ice-coated and in poor shape, but White had engineers who could make hasty repairs. With no interference from the PVA, White got his column started at 15:00 and pulled out his rearguard about two hours later. At the same time, the 674th and 96th Field Artillery Battalions, which had been supporting the ROKA 5th Infantry Division from positions 6 miles (9.7 km) east of Hoengsong, moved to new firing positions 4 miles (6.4 km) south. At the time, General Frank S. Bowen, the 187th Airborne Regimental Combat Team (187th RCT) commander and coordinator of these two artillery battalions, expected the 5th Division to make a stand above the new artillery positions in defense of Hoengsong. The 1st Battalion of the combat team, which earlier had taken a blocking position below the 5th Division, moved back with the artillery units.

Keith meanwhile led Support Force 21 south from the road junction just before noon, two companies of Keleher's infantry moving through the high ground on both sides of Route 29 to protect the motor column and remaining foot troops on the road. Both Support Team A and Support Team B remained with Maixner to help defend the perimeter which was still under assault. Mortar and artillery fire and airstrikes arranged by Coughlin pounded the ridges ahead of the support force, but Keleher's men almost immediately ran into strong resistance and lost momentum after 1 mile (1.6 km). Keleher committed the remainder of his battalion, but it was not enough to revitalize his attack. About the time Keleher's attack stalled, word reached Coughlin that the ROKA 18th Regiment, 3rd Division, assembled about 3 miles (4.8 km) east of Hoengsong, would send a battalion north astride Route 29 at 14:00 to help open the road. Almond had ordered this attack shortly after instructing the artillery support forces to withdraw. Support Team E (Company G, 187th RCT, and a platoon from the 72nd Tank Battalion), also assembled nearby, was to accompany the South Koreans. The assistant commander of the ROKA 3rd Division was to head the force, but Almond assigned the Corps armored officer, Lieutenant colonel Jack F. Wilhm, to coordinate the organization and opening of the infantry-armor advance. Coughlin had no part in it at all. The ROKA battalion was late getting started, then advanced only 0.5 miles (0.80 km) north of Hoengsong onto the first hills above the Twinnan-mul. Support Team E moved only as far as the river's lower bank. Observing the short advance and halt, Coughlin's operations officer, Majar Warren D. Hodges, sought out the ROKA commander and argued for continuing the advance. The ROKA officer refused, his orders, he insisted, were to take the hills he now occupied and hold them only until dark. His one concession was that he would remain in position until the forces withdrawing from the road junction passed through. Coughlin did not have the authority to order the ROKA-U.S. force further up Route 29, but he had finally regained his 3rd Battalion to assist the withdrawal from the road junction. Almond released the battalion from its blocking assignment at 14:30.

Just before releasing the battalion Almond had discussed Corps' operations with Ridgway, who flew into Almond's Wonju headquarters a little past noon. Almond announced that he now planned to give up Hoengsong and defend Wonju. His formal order issued late in the day called for the 2nd Division, with the 187th RCT attached, to defend a long line which from an anchor on the west at Chip'yong-ni stretched out to the southeast and east, passing 2 miles (3.2 km) north of Wonju and continuing 9 miles (14 km) beyond the town. In the right portion of the corps sector, the ROKA 3rd and 5th Divisions were to stand between Route 29 and the Corps' east boundary some 7 miles (11 km) farther north. Placing the South Koreans on this forward line would tie the X Corps to the left of the ROKA III Corps, whose line now bulged out to the north far beyond the X Corps front. To back up the South Koreans and secure the Corps' east flank in-depth, the 31st Infantry Regiment of General Ferenbaugh's 7th Infantry Division was to occupy positions at Todon-ni, a road junction 4 miles (6.4 km) below Pyongchang. Firebaugh's 32nd Infantry Regiment, still holding positions between Chech'on and Yongwol, would lend further depth, and the 17th Infantry Regiment, now scheduled to assemble in Corps' reserve near Wonju, could be committed to help. To improve control, Almond during his talk with Ridgway requested that the ROKA I Corps headquarters be attached to the X Corps to take charge of the ROKA 3rd and 5th Divisions. General Kim Hong-il and his staff, by virtue of past service under Almond in northeastern Korea, were experienced in joint operations and were well acquainted with the X Corps staff. Ridgway approved. He arranged to have Kim and a partial staff flown into the X Corps sector on the 13th and to have Kim's remaining staff follow by truck. The ROKA Capital Division, in the meantime, was to pass to ROKA III Corps control.

Coughlin, after receiving word of the 3rd Battalion's release about 16:00, instructed Maixner and Keleher to drive through the roadblock with the 1st Battalion attacking on the east side of the road, the 3rd Battalion on the west, and the motor column between them. Maixner disengaged at the road junction and joined Keleher in the attack by 18:00. The two battalions were able to move, but only at a costly creep. PVA mortar, machine gun and small arms fire meanwhile continued to punish the motor column. Coughlin's inability to assist with an attack north out of Hoengsong was clearly enfeebling the withdrawal. A little after 18:00 Wilhm, the Corps' armored officer, came into the 38th Infantry command post to notify Coughlin to take charge of all American troops in the Hoengsong area. Wilhm had got this word from Corps when he called his headquarters to report the short South Korean advance above Hoengsong. The restriction to American forces prevented Coughlin from using the South Korean battalion to help his withdrawing forces, but he at least could employ Support Team E. He placed his regimental tank company commander in charge of the support team and ordered him to link up with the forces coming from the north. The tank company commander, spearheading with two of his own tanks, started the tank-infantry team up Route 29 within minutes. Around 19:00 Coughlin discovered troops of Support Force 7 to be moving through Hoengsong. Lieutenant colonel Baker, commanding the 2nd Battalion, 17th Infantry, was directing his foot troops and the leading serial of artillery into an assembly southeast of town. Up to this moment, Coughlin had not known of Support Force 7's withdrawal through the Twinnan-mul valley, which had been worked out with Corps through artillery channels. He had believed White's force to be somewhere behind his own on Route 29. Under the Corps' order placing him in charge of American troops in Hoengsong, Coughlin now could use Support Force 7 to help the forces withdrawing over Route 29. He notified Baker that the support force artillery should withdraw to Wonju but that Baker's infantry battalion would be sent north to help clear Route 29. Baker left Coughlin to give these instructions to White, still northeast of town with the remainder of Support Force 7, and then to return to Coughlin's command post for further word on the attack north. When Baker radioed Coughlin's instructions to White, he learned that a 155-mm howitzer and its tractor had slipped off the road about 1 mile (1.6 km) northeast of Hoengsong where the road was little more than an icy ledge in a steep ridge bordering the Twinnanmul. Considerable road work was needed at that point before the remainder of the motor column could continue.

The ROKA 3rd and 5th Divisions, the latter being followed by forces of the KPA V Corps, meanwhile were passing south through the area east of Hoengsong en route to their newly assigned defense line. Ahead of the South Koreans, Bowen was pulling his infantry battalions and the 674th and 96th Field Artillery Battalions back to Wonju. A Korean Military Advisory Group (KMAG) officer with the South Koreans passing nearest Hoengsong informed Baker that the enemy forces following the 5th Division had cut the lateral road stretching eastward from Hoengsong which the leading troops of Support Force 7 had used to reach their assembly southeast of town. Although the cut was beyond the support force assembly, Baker began to pull the leading troops and trucks back into Hoengsong and reassemble them along Route 29 south of town. He was still shifting forces around 22:00 when the remainder of Support Force 7 began to arrive from the northeast, and he had yet to return to Coughlin's command post for his attack order. At that late hour, an attack up Route 29 by Baker did not appear necessary. Suffering moderate casualties and losing one tank, Support Team E had fought forward for about 1.5 miles (2.4 km) and joined Coughlin's forces coming south around 21:00. After the E team tanks turned around and took the lead, the combined force, though still receiving heavy fire from left and right and still obliged to attack PVA positions bordering the road, was able to move south at a steady pace. By the time the force reached the position taken by the ROKA battalion 0.5 miles (0.80 km) above Hoengsong, the South Koreans already had withdrawn to rejoin their division. But this premature departure seemed of no consequence. Before 22:00 the long column began to pass behind the Netherlands Battalion positions along the upper edge of Hoengsong.

Coughlin intended that the forces coming in from the north continue through Hoengsong, reorganize in an assembly area 3 miles (4.8 km) south of town, then proceed to the new defense line at Wonju. Support Force 7 was to do likewise as it came in from the northeast. Coughlin's own headquarters and remaining troops, except for the Netherlands Battalion and part of the regimental tank company, were already on the way out of Hoengsong. The Netherlands Battalion was to continue covering the passage of the withdrawing forces, then act as rearguard en route to Wonju. The regimental tankers were assembled just below the town, prepared to attack any roadblock the PVA might establish between Hoengsong and Wonju. Coughlin's plan was interrupted not long after the leading units coming down Route 29 entered Hoengsong, when PVA forces attacked all along the line of the Netherlands Battalion and soon afterward began to press hard from the flanks and rear on the withdrawing column still strung out on Route 29. Had the ROK battalion not withdrawn ahead of schedule, it now would have been of considerable help. One of the first PVA jabs at the Dutch penetrated their line and reached the battalion command post. Lieutenant colonel M.P.A. den Ouden, the battalion commander, led headquarters troops in a successful attack to eliminate the penetration, but was killed by a grenade. Members of den Ouden's staff also were killed or wounded. Despite these grave losses at battalion headquarters, the Dutch line companies held at the edge of town while Support Force 7 moved toward town from the northeast and Coughlin's other forces struggled to get in over Route 29. Support Force 7 received small arms, machine gun and mortar fire as White led it out of the Twinnanmul valley, and considerable confusion occurred inside Hoengsong as White's column merged with the vehicles Baker was moving through town. But Baker pushed part of his infantry back toward White to help keep PVA forces away from White's flanks, and artillerymen at White's rear managed to ward off PVA troops attempting to roll up the column. These efforts and covering fire from the Dutch kept losses low and allowed Support Force 7 to pass behind the Netherlands Battalion by 23:30. Baker's battalion helped cover Hoengsong for another hour while White started the artillery units down Route 29 toward Wonju. Baker's troops then mounted their own trucks to bring up the support force rear. Part of the artillery reached Wonju without further trouble, but as this segment passed a point about 1.5 miles (2.4 km) below Hoengsong, PVA forces crowded in on the road from the west and opened fire. Some 20 vehicles ran the gauntlet before the fire grew too heavy to risk. Baker, bringing up infantry and some of Coughlin's tanks from the rear, attacked and destroyed the PVA position, allowing the support force to move on to Wonju with no further encounter. Support Force 7 casualties suffered above and below Hoengsong totalled 12 killed, 125 wounded and 53 missing. The major equipment losses were 35 vehicles, the 155-mm howitzer that slipped off the road, and an M16 Multiple Gun Motor Carriage that threw a track above Hoengsong.

Coughlin's column coming toward Hoengsong on Route 29 was less fortunate. Behind those forces leading the column into Hoengsong, a mortar round struck a 2 1/2-ton truck towing a 105-mm howitzer, and the two jackknifed across the road. The occupants of the truck were either killed or scattered, and an alert PVA machine gunner opened sustained fire on the cab to prevent anyone from trying to reach and restart the vehicle. The one chance of pushing the wreckage off the road evaporated when Mace's two tanks, the only ones not already in Hoengsong, merely moved around the obstruction through a bordering rice paddy and went into town. High paddy dikes made it impossible for the trucks, many of them pulling howitzers, to bypass the wreckage as the tanks had done. PVA forces meanwhile began to squeeze the column from the flanks and rear. The troops caught behind the obstruction had no alternative except to abandon vehicles and guns and move south on foot. Many did not reach safety, among them Keith, who later died in captivity. Those able to escape, as they neared Hoengsong and discovered the Netherlands Battalion engaged, drifted west to get away from the firefight, bypassed Hoengsong, then returned to Route 29 below the town. After reorganizing behind the cover of the Netherlands Battalion, they moved on to Wonju. The Dutch broke contact and followed just before 01:00. PVA forces seized Hoengsong after the Dutch withdrawal but made no effort to pursue, and since Baker already had eliminated the only PVA position south of town, Coughlin's forces reached Wonju with no further contest.

== Aftermath ==
Given the conditions of the PVA attack and the Corps' withdrawal, a breakdown of X Corps' casualties into categories of killed, wounded and missing was not possible for some units, especially the ROKA 8th Division, and hardly certifiable for any. Total casualties suffered between nightfall on 11 February and daylight on the 13th were around 11,800-9,800 South Koreans, 1,900 Americans and 100 Dutch. The equipment toll was correspondingly heavy. Major items lost by the ROKA 3rd, 5th, and 8th Divisions, mostly by the last, included 14 105-mm howitzers, 901 other crew-served weapons, 390 radios, and 88 vehicles. American units and the Netherlands Battalion lost 14 105-mm howitzers, six 155-mm howitzers, 277 other crew-served weapons, six tanks, 195 radios, and 280 vehicles.

Following the defeat of the UN forces at Hoengsong, the PVA attacked the isolated UN forces at Chipyong-ni from 13 to 15 February, but were unable to overrun them. The PVA/KPA forces continued to push south but were halted by X Corps and ROKA III Corps in the Third Battle of Wonju from 13 to 18 February.

=== Investigation ===
Ridgway initially considered the high equipment losses evidence of weak leadership. "While there is nothing sacrosanct about a piece of artillery, compared to the loss of the lives of men", he wrote Almond on the 13th, "I don't expect to hear again of such loss as reported to me this morning of five 155 Howitzers of Battery A, 503rd. It is prima facie indication of faulty leadership of serious import in some echelon." On the following day, he instructed his inspector-general to investigate all "the circumstances attending the loss by X Corps of artillery pieces and other major items of equipment on or about 12 February 1951." Almond was equally disturbed by the massive loss of equipment, especially the loss of 14 howitzers by the 15th Field Artillery Battalion and five by the 503rd, and by what he considered excessive personnel casualties among all 2nd Division units that had supported the ROKA 8th Division. Late on the 13th, he directed Ruffner to investigate and report the underlying reasons. He was particularly critical of Support Force 21's halt at the road junction position of the 3rd Battalion, 38th Infantry, believing that losses would have been fewer had the support force continued directly to Hoengsong. He took this preliminary view from an impression that Support Force 7, on the other hand, had withdrawn immediately after being ordered back and that this prompt move accounted for its lighter losses. Pending receipt of Ruffner's report, Almond presumed that "aggressive leadership on the part of commanders concerned was lacking."

If in softer terms, Almond repeated much the same view on the 14th when he replied to Ridgway's note of admonition. Without being specific, but referring to Support Force 21, he told Ridgway that "in only one instance, now under investigation, have I found loss of U.S. equipment due to faulty leadership, and all the facts on this are not evident yet." Recalling Ridgway's earlier concern for Roundup control arrangements, Almond assured him that "the operation, as conceived and coordinated, included the protection of the U.S. artillery units involved and was, in my opinion, all that could be desired. It worked out as planned except for two battalions of infantry and 1 of artillery which became enmeshed in the onslaught of Chinese who poured through the ROK formations. There has never been any loss of control of the major units." The 2nd Division report, rendered five days later, absolved Support Force 21 of any command deficiency. General Stewart, the assistant division commander who conducted the inquiry for Ruffner, concluded that there had been only "strong, courageous, and aggressive" leadership at all levels. Support force commander Keith had withdrawn from Ch'angbong-ni as soon as cleared to do so, had not yet received orders to proceed to Hoengsong when he stopped and joined the 3rd Battalion, 38th Infantry, and had made every effort to reach Hoengsong as soon as such orders reached him. The cause of the losses in equipment and personnel among 2nd Division units, Stewart testified, was the sudden and complete defeat of the ROKA 8th Division with little or no warning to the 2nd Division forces. He recommended that there be no similar intermingling of US and South Korean units in the future. The Army investigation confirmed Stewart's findings. All losses, in both men and materiel, stemmed from "the surprise and overwhelming attack of at least four [PVA] Divisions and two [KPA] Divisions... against numerically inferior and widely spread forces of the 8th and 3rd ROK Divisions." In chain reaction, the rapid disintegration of the ROKA 8th Division "exposed the left flank of the [X Corps] salient and permitted the enemy forces in strength to advance rapidly to positions in the rear and along the [Main Supply Route], thus blocking the only route of withdrawal for the tanks, artillery, and motor elements caught north and west of Hoengsong." In this unexpected situation, "there [were] insufficient US or other UN forces available to the X Corps Commander or the 2nd U.S. Infantry Division Commander to form a task force of sufficient strength to defeat the enemy's efforts and to break... the roadblocks that delayed the withdrawal of the friendly units located north." Hence, the heavy toll was a result of enemy action and not attributable to the "fault, neglect, incompetence, acts or omissions of the U.S. Commanding Officers concerned." Ridgway accepted this explanation but did not withdraw a warning he had issued on the 14th. The "loss or abandonment to enemy of arms and equipment in usable condition", he notified all corps commanders and the KMAG chief, General Farrell, "is a grave offense against every member of this command. I shall hereafter deal severely with commanders found responsible and shall expect you to do likewise."

== In film ==
The battle was depicted in the 2007 Chinese film Assembly.
