= Operation Killer =

1951 UN victory in the Korean War

Coordinates: 37°32′35.79″N 126°58′53.93″E

- Part of the Korean War
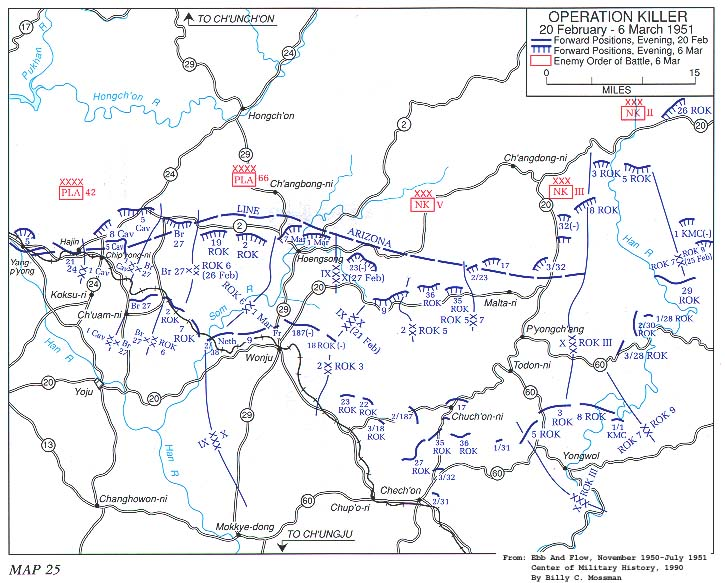
- Operation Killer map
| Date | 20 February – 6 March 1951 |
| Location | Korea |
| Result | UN victory |

Belligerents
| United Nations: United States; South Korea; United Kingdom; Australia; Canada; New Zealand | China; North Korea |

Commanders and leaders
| (United Nations) Douglas MacArthur (United States) Matthew Ridgway (United States) Bryant Moore † (United States) Oliver P. Smith (United States) Edward Almond (First Republic of Korea) Yu Jae-hung | (China) Peng Dehuai |

Casualties and losses
| South Korea; 59 killed 802 missing 119 wounded Total 980 Casualties | China; 7,819 killed 1,469 wounded 208 captured Total 9,496 casualties |

Operation Killer was a military operation that marked the start of the second major counter offensive which United Nations Command (UN) forces launched against the Chinese Communist People's Volunteer Army (PVA) and the North Korean Army (KPA) during the Korean War. The offensive lasted from 20 February to 6 March 1951 and was formulated by General Matthew Ridgway with the goal of annihilating enemy forces south of a line designated the Arizona Line. The operation was immediately followed by Operation Ripper.

== Background ==
After their defeats at the Battle of Chipyong-ni and the Third Battle of Wonju, it became apparent that the PVA/KPA forces were retreating from the salient that they had created in their Chinese Fourth Phase Offensive. The withdrawal fit the pattern of earlier-observed PVA/KPA operations where assault forces were obliged to pause for refitting after a week or so of battle. During the evening of 18 March, Ridgway planned an advance which was designed with two goals in mind. First, to deny the PVA/KPA any respite in which to prepare new attacks and second, more importantly, to destroy the PVA/KPA forces that were moving north out of the Chech'on salient. He intended for the two principal thrusts of UN attack, up Route 29 from Wonju beyond Hoengsong and up Route 60 from Yongwol beyond P'yongch'ang, to block the main paths of PVA/KPA withdrawal. Other attack axes were to move through and clear the adjacent ground. The main purpose of the attack made him call it Operation Killer.

When the codename chosen by Ridgway for the coming operation was discovered by officials in Washington, it drew protest from the Army Chief of Staff, General Collins, who told Ridgway that the word "killer" was difficult to deal with in public relations. Ridgway nevertheless kept the name, which he said fully described his main objective.

Ridgway instructed US IX and X Corps to destroy PVA/KPA forces which were located east of the Han River and south of a line, designated Arizona, running from Yangpyeong eastward across Route 29 3 miles (4.8 km) above Hoengsong and across Route 60 6 miles (9.7 km) above P'yongch'ang to an advance of approximately 12–15 miles (19–24 km) above the front line. The principal thrust up Route 29 was to be made by IX Corps while the one up Route 60 was to be made by X Corps. To accommodate the axes of attack, the IX Corps-X Corps boundary was to be relocated east of Route 29 and the X Corps-Republic of Korea Army (ROKA) III Corps boundary shifted to the east side of Route 60 when the advance was opened on 21 February.

The west flank of the advance was to be adequately protected by US I Corps and 24th Infantry Division positions along the lower bank of the Han River. To protect the east flank, ROKA III Corps was to send its leftmost division, the 7th Infantry Division, north through the heights east of Route 60. ROKA III Corps' remaining divisions, the 9th and Capital Infantry Divisions, were to secure the lateral Route 20 winding southwest through the mountains out of Gangneung on the coast. If ROKA III Corps commander Major general Yu Jae-hung was unable to develop continuous defenses above the road, he was to at least ensure possession of Gangneung. If necessary, Yu was to set the Capital Division in a strong perimeter around the coastal town, and Ridgway was to see that the division thereafter was supplied by sea or air and supported by naval gunfire.

A week prior to Operation Killer, PVA forces broke up X Corps' Roundup advance and threatened to strike deep through the Han River valley. Ridgway had ordered the US 1st Marine Division to move up from Pohang, where it had been conducting anti-guerilla operations, to Chungju arriving on 18 February. Ridgway attached the division to IX Corps. The Marines were to relieve the US 2nd Infantry Division and 187th Airborne Regimental Combat Team (187th RCT) in the Wonju area, which on the 21st would fall within the zone of IX Corps. The 2nd Division and the 187th RCT then were to shift east and rejoin X Corps.

IX Corps commander Major general Bryant Moore chose the 1st Marine Division to make the IX Corps drive along Route 29. The division initially was to seize high ground just south of Hoengsong from which it could control that road center. To the west, the ROKA 6th Infantry Division, British 27th Infantry Brigade and the US 1st Cavalry Division were to clear the mountains between the Marines and the Han. In the X Corps' zone, the US 7th Infantry Division and ROKA 3rd Division were to open the advance to the Arizona Line; they were to be joined later by the 2nd Infantry Division after it shifted east from Wonju. The damaged ROKA 5th and 8th Infantry Divisions were to move off the line, the 5th to help protect the Corps' supply route while the more severely reduced 8th was to go south to Taegu, where it was to be rebuilt under ROKA control.

The 187th RCT, when it moved from Wonju, was to assemble northeast of Chech'on and be ready to assist 7th Division's attack. X Corps' commander General Almond was not to commit the unit, however, without Ridgway's approval. For his part, Ridgway intended to move the airborne troops to the Taegu airfield for refresher jump training. He was looking to possible future operations, in particular to plans prepared at his direction in January for the seizure of Seoul. These plans in part called for an airborne landing behind the capital to block enemy escape routes.

Almond assigned the 7th Infantry Division to make the X Corps' thrust up Route 60 on the Corps' right flank. Initially the 7th was to clear Pyeongchang and seize the junction of Routes 60 and 20 5 miles (8.0 km) north of the town. Almond wanted General Ferenbaugh to then block Route 20 to the northeast and simultaneously strike west across the Corps' front along Route 20 to a juncture with IX Corps in order to seal off enemy forces remaining in the Chech'on salient. At the left of the Corps' zone, the ROKA 3rd Infantry Division was to clear enemy forces from an area which narrowed to a point on Route 20. The 2nd Infantry Division, minus the 38th Infantry Regiment (which was to become Corps' reserve), was to start north on 22 February to clear a wide area of rough ground in the center of the Corps' zone and to occupy positions commanding Route 20. If the timing was right, General Ruffner's forces could hammer enemy units against an anvil provided by 7th Infantry Division troops driving west over Route 20.

== Battle ==
By 21 February the PVA and KPA had at least three days to withdraw from the salient and had given no indication that they would not do so until they had moved north beyond the Arizona Line. If these forces were to be destroyed, Ridgway's assault had to advance rapidly, but the weather made such a task impossible from the outset. For the first 20 days of February, weather conditions on the battlefield had been within their normal range. The temperature varied from scarcely a degree above the freezing point to 15 degrees Fahrenheit below, and precipitation was largely snow that remained on the ground, sometimes as ice. However, an abrupt and unexpected change in the weather accompanied the opening of the operation. The temperature rose to almost 50 degrees on the 21st and that night barely fell to the freezing mark. The higher temperature range persisted for the remainder of the month. The 21st and the three days following saw steady to intermittent rainfall. Together, the unseasonable rain and warmer temperatures transformed rivers and streams into courses of deep, fast-moving water filled with floating ice. Fords became unusable, and low bridges were washed out or damaged beyond use. The rain and daytime thawing made quagmires of the roads and countryside, and landslides blocked or partially blocked tunnels, roads, and rail lines. Night freezes made the roads difficult to negotiate, especially where the grades were steep and curves sharp. As a result, the operation became at once a plodding affair, not so much an advance with two main thrusts as a more uniform clearing operation in which assault forces fought hardest to overcome the effects of weather. Ahead of the advance, the PVA/KPA concentrated on evacuating the salient, leaving behind only scattered forces to fight the occasional but strong delaying actions.

Ridgway kept a careful watch over the operation, reconnoitering much of the zone of advance from the air and questioning Corps' commanders closely during the first three days of the operation on the problems the weather had created. Although Moore and Almond experienced difficulty with their logistics operations, neither advocated abandoning or postponing the advance. Frequent airdrops kept the supply problem from becoming critical, and by 25 February engineers had repaired much of the damage to main lines of communication. The advance continued, if far more slowly than anticipated.

About 10:30 on 24 February, the helicopter carrying Moore crashed into the Han River and Moore subsequently died of a heart attack. He was temporarily replaced by 1st Marine Division commander Major general Oliver P. Smith.

Laboring forward through the remainder of February, Ridgway's central forces largely eliminated the PVA/KPA's recent ground gains. From west to east, the IX and X Corps front on the last day of the month traced a shallow concave arc from positions 5 miles (8.0 km) above Chipyong-ni, along high ground overlooking Hoengsong and Route 20 from the south, to the high hills 4 miles (6.4 km) north of the Routes 20- 60 junction. The two Corps thus were on or above the Arizona Line on the extreme west and east but somewhat short of it elsewhere.

Meanwhile, in the ROKA III Corps' zone Yu opened a lateral attack, sending two regiments of the Capital Division from the Gangneung area westward over Route 20 across the fronts of his other two divisions as a preliminary to establishing defenses above the road. The regiments, moving in column, advanced easily until late in the afternoon of 3 March when the leading regiment ran headlong into an ambush near Soksa-ri, some 25 miles (40 km) west of Gangneung. Hit from both north and south by a regiment of the KPA 2nd Division, the ROKA regiment lost almost a thousand men - 59 killed, 119 wounded and 802 missing. The damaged regiment returned to the Gangneung area to reorganize and Yu canceled what from the outset had been a decidedly risky movement.

To the west, in the meantime, those IX and X Corps units which were not yet on the Arizona Line continued their advances to reach it. In the IX Corps' zone, the 1st Marine Division cleared Hoengsong with little opposition on 2 March en route to Arizona objectives 3 miles (4.8 km) north of town. By evening of 6 March all IX Corps' assault units had established positions near or slightly above the Arizona Line, with the final advances encountering no resistance at all. The X Corps' units met stiff opposition over the first five days of March, particularly the 2nd Infantry Division as it attempted to occupy the high ground just above Route 20. But during the night of 5 March the KPA defenders vacated their positions, and by 7 March Almond's forces were mostly in full possession of their Arizona objectives.

== Aftermath ==
Over the 14 days the two Corps took to reach and consolidate positions along the Arizona Line, each reported having inflicted substantial casualties. IX Corps alone reported 7,819 enemy killed, 1,469 wounded, and 208 captured. But from the outset it had become steadily clearer that the primary objective of Operation Killer of destroying all PVA/KPA forces below the Arizona Line would be only partially achieved. The PVA/KPA forces' head start in withdrawing, their disinclination to take a defensive stand below the objective line other than in spotty delaying actions and difficulties in negotiating the ground had prevented any other result.
