= Operation Roundup =

Operation Roundup may refer to:

- Operation Roundup (1942), plan for an invasion of northern France by Allied forces during World War II
- Operation Roundup (1951), attack launched by United States forces during the Korean War
