= Operation Thunderbolt (1951) =

United Nations offensive during the Korean War

- Part of the Korean War
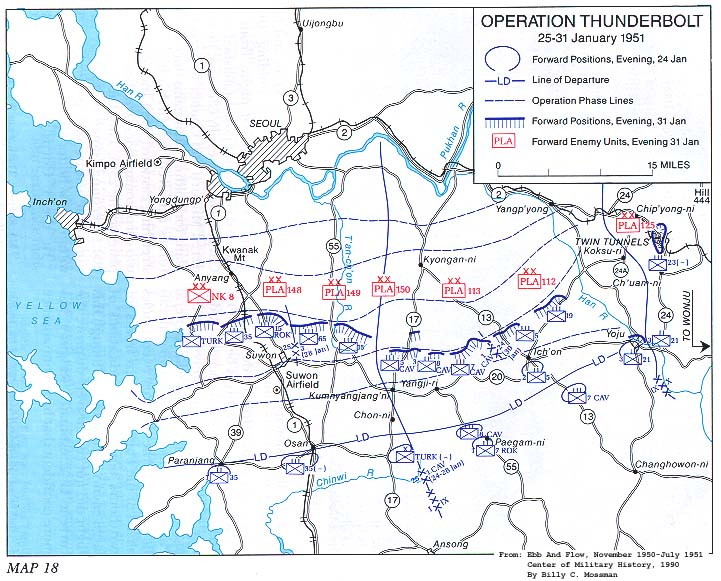
- Operation Thunderbolt map
Date	25 January – 11 February 1951
Location	Han River, South Korea
Result	United Nations victory

Belligerents
United Nations: USA; UK; Turkey; South Korea; Colombia	China; North Korea

Commanders and leaders
(United Nations) Douglas MacArthur (United States) Matthew B. Ridgway (United States) Frank W. Milburn (United States) John B. Coulter (United States) Bryant E. Moore	(China) Peng Dehuai (China) Liang Xingchu (China) Zeng Zesheng (North Korea) Lee Kwon Mu

Units involved
(United States) Eighth Army: (United States) 3rd Infantry Division; (United States) 24th Infantry Division; (Colombia) Colombian Battalion; (United States) 25th Infantry Division; (First Republic of Korea) 1st Infantry Division; (First Republic of Korea) 6th Infantry Division; (United Kingdom) 27th Infantry Brigade; (United Kingdom) 29th Infantry Brigade; (Turkey) Turkish Brigade	(China) 38th Army (China) 50th Army (North Korea) I Corps

Strength
94,147	50,000

Casualties and losses
US: 2,228 killed ~7,000 total casualties Total: Unknown; Chinese estimate: 20,000	18,600

Operation Thunderbolt, also known in China as the Defensive Battle of the Han River Southern Bank (Chinese: 汉江南岸防御战; pinyin: Hàn Jiāng Nán Àn Fáng Yù Zhàn), was a US offensive during the Korean War. It was the first offensive under the new commanding officer of the US Eighth Army, General Matthew Ridgway and started less than three weeks after the Chinese Third Phase Campaign had forced UN forces south of Seoul.

== Operation Wolfhound ==
On 15 January 1951 Ridgway ordered a reconnaissance in force by US I Corps. Ridgway warned I Corps' commander General Frank W. Milburn against permitting any situation to develop during the operation that would require additional forces to extricate those initially committed. Neither was Milburn to attempt a large scale exploitation, if that opportunity occurred, except on Ridgway's order. If all went according to instructions, Ridgway estimated, the operation would be concluded by dark on the 15th or, at the latest, on the 16th. Milburn assigned the main task to the 25th Infantry Division, instructing General William B. Kean to attack the Suwon-Osan area with an infantry regiment and a battalion of tanks supported by artillery and engineers. Kean selected as the central force the 27th Infantry Regiment Wolfhounds, from whose nickname the reconnaissance was named Operation Wolfhound. To protect the main force on the east, Milburn ordered the 3rd Infantry Division to send a smaller force of infantry and tanks to cut the Suwon-Kumnyangjang-ni stretch of the lateral Route 20 and instructed the Republic of Korea Army (ROKA) 1st Infantry Division to send a battalion as far as Ch'on-ni (37.2°N 127.2085°E), on Route 17 3 miles (4.8 km) south of Kumnyangjang-ni (37.235°N 127.2085°E). Ridgway notified U.S. IX Corps also to provide protection on the east, for which IX Corps' commander General John B. Coulter directed the ROKA 6th Infantry Division to station a battalion in blocking positions just east of Kumnyangjang-ni.

On the 15th the ROKA battalions reached Ch'on-ni and Kumnyangjang-ni over Route 17 without contact. The 1st Battalion, 15th Infantry Regiment, and two companies of tanks from the 3rd Division which followed the same axis to Kumnyangjang-ni received small arms and heavy mortar fire after turning west for 1 mile (1.6 km) on Route 20 toward Suwon. An exchange of fire with some 6-800 PVA held the 3rd Division force in place for the remainder of the day. Wolfhound forces elsewhere met no opposition, but were delayed by damaged roads and bridges. The bulk of the reinforced 27th Infantry moving over Route 1 in the main effort halted for the night at the northern edge of Osan. The 1st Battalion of the regiment and tanks following Route 39 near the coast stopped at Paranjang, 10 miles (16 km) to the west.

As Colonel John H. Michaelis' two columns converged on Suwon over Routes 1 and 39 on the morning of the 16th, Milburn ordered the Wolfhound forces to withdraw to the Chinwi River at 14:00. Having so far met only a few PVA, who appeared to be stragglers, Michaelis ordered a motorized company of infantry and a company of tanks from each column to sprint ahead and inflict as much damage as possible on enemy forces discovered in Suwon before withdrawing. On the left, after the tank-infantry team moving on Route 39 to Route 20 and then turning east came to a destroyed bridge 2 miles (3.2 km) southwest of Suwon, dismounted infantry continued the advance and investigated the southwestern edge of town without finding PVA/KPA forces. On Route 1 the tanks and infantry received fire from a strong PVA force deployed 0.5 miles (0.80 km) south of Suwon and from machine gunners atop buildings inside town. Michaelis' team deployed and returned the fire for a half hour, then under the cover of air strikes withdrew out of range.

The Wolfhound forces developed a Corps' outpost line along the Chinwi with a westward extension to the coast and pushed patrols back into PVA/KPA territory. Ridgway commended them, more for the offensive spirit displayed than for results achieved. Milburn estimated that the two-day operation had inflicted 1,380 PVA/KPA casualties, 1,180 by air strikes, five captured and 195 killed by ground troops, his own losses were three killed and seven wounded. The PVA captives identified three armies, but since the 27th Infantry had taken these prisoners before running into the PVA position at Suwon, the identity of the unit defending the town was obscure. Most pertinent, the reconnaissance revealed that no large force was located south of the Suwon-Kumnyangjang-ni line, but that organized groups did hold positions along it.

Having successfully concluded Wolfhound on 20 January, Ridgway instructed his Corps' commanders to devise similar operations. Milburn responded on the 22nd with an infantry-armor strike built around the 35th Infantry Regiment that in concept nearly duplicated Operation Wolfhound. Two small encounters during the one-day operation resulted in three PVA/KPA killed and one captured with no losses to the regiment. The strike confirmed the absence of strong PVA/KPA forces within 10 miles (16 km) of the I Corps front. It also raised the possibility that KPA forces were now operating south of Seoul when the captive identified his unit as the 8th Division, part of KPA I Corps.

== Task Force Johnson ==
During the week before Ridgway issued his 20 January directive he had prodded Coulter to increase the strength, continuity, and depth of IX Corps’ reconnaissance. He also had directed Coulter to move the 1st Cavalry Division's 70th Tank Battalion from its deep reserve location near Sangju in the Naktong River valley to Chinch'on, 15 miles (24 km) behind the Corps front. From Chinch'on the tankers were to back up the ROKA 6th Infantry Division and also were to be employed in a reconnaissance in force wherever Coulter saw an opportunity. Regardless of Ridgway's dissatisfaction, Coulter was certain that his patrols had shown the IX Corps sector below the Kumnyangjang-ni-Ich’on-Yoju road to be free of any large PVA/KPA force. Since 12 January the 24th Infantry Division had kept a battalion in Yoju, and on the 21st General John H. Church dispatched another battalion accompanied by tanks and a battery of artillery to Ich'on with instructions to stay until pushed out. At the Corps' left, the ROKA 6th Infantry Division had not established outposts that far forward but had placed a battalion at Paengam-ni on secondary Route 55, 6 miles (9.7 km) short of the Kumnyangjang-ni-Ich'on stretch of Route 20.

After receiving Ridgway's instructions on the 20th, Coulter scheduled for the 22nd a one-day operation built around the 70th Tank Battalion in which his force was to push north of Route 20 between Kumnyangjang-ni and Ich'on. The 1st Cavalry Division was to mount the operation, developing and pushing the PVA/KPA in the objective area without becoming heavily engaged. General Hobart R. Gay organized a task force under the 8th Cavalry Regiment commanded by Colonel Harold K. Johnson that added infantry, artillery, and engineers to the tank battalion. Johnson was to move up Route 55 through the South Korean outpost at Paengam-ni to Yangji-ri on Route 20, then investigate east and west along the road and the high ground immediately above it. Johnson's principal engagement was an exchange of fire with an enemy company discovered on the reverse slopes of the first heights above Yangji-ri. The task force suffered two killed and five wounded, while enemy casualties were estimated at 15 killed by ground troops and 50 by air strikes. The lack of contact before reaching Yangji-ri supported Coulter's conviction that the area below Route 20 was unoccupied, while the Yangji-ri exchange supplied further evidence that organized enemy groups were located along the road.

== Operation ==
=== Reconnaissance in force (9-29 January) ===
Ridgway wanted a clearer picture of PVA/KPA dispositions below the Han River before committing forces to general offensive operations. On 23 January his intelligence officer reported the bulk of the PVA XIII Army Group to be below Seoul in the area bounded by Route 20 on the south and the Han River on the east and north. Air reconnaissance had been reporting steady troop movements below the Han but did not confirm the presence of such a large force in that region. Nor had recent ground contacts developed any solid enemy defense at the area's lower edge. Resolving the ambiguities, Ridgway judged, required a deeper and stronger reconnaissance in force, which he scheduled for the morning of the 25th under the name Operation Thunderbolt.

In the operation Milburn and Coulter were to reconnoiter as far as the Han, each using not more than one US division reinforced by armor and, at the discretion of each Corps commander, one South Korean regiment. Each Corps' force was to establish a base of operations on the night of the 24th along a line of departure 10 miles (16 km) ahead of Line D, from the coast through Osan to Yoju, then advance to the Han in multiple columns through five phase lines about 5 miles (8.0 km) apart. To ensure a fully coordinated reconnaissance, Ridgway made Milburn responsible for ordering the advance from each phase line in both Corps' zones; to guarantee the security of the advance, he instructed Milburn to order each successive move only after he had clearly determined that no enemy group strong enough to endanger any column had been bypassed. Ridgway intended that his ground troops would have ample air support. He planned to postpone the operation if for any reason on the 25th Fifth Air Force commander General Earle E. Partridge could not assure two successive days of maximum close support. Ridgway also arranged for I Corps to be able to call down gunfire from a heavy cruiser and two destroyers of Task Force 95 stationed off Inchon.

X Corps was to protect the right flank of the Thunderbolt advance. On 23 January Ridgway had his deputy chief of staff, Brigadier general Henry I. Hodes, deliver instructions to General Edward Almond requiring X Corps to maintain contact with IX Corps at Yoju and to prevent enemy movements south of the Yoju-Wonju road. Almond, as he had been instructed three days earlier, also was to send forces in diversionary forays north of this road.

On the 24th Ridgway reconnoitered the objective area from the air with Partridge as his pilot. The two generals flew low over the territory 20 miles (32 km) ahead of the I and IX Corps fronts for two hours, but saw no indications of large enemy formations. Although this flight did not conclusively disprove the current intelligence estimate, Ridgway was more confident that his forces would reach the Han, and he also saw possibility of holding the ground covered. That night, from a forward command post established at I Corps headquarters in Cheonan, he ordered Milburn and Coulter to prepare plans for holding their gains once their forces achieved the fifth phase line stretching eastward from Inchon. The two Corps' commanders completed these plans on the 25th. Thus the Thunderbolt reconnaissance tentatively assumed the nature of a general attack within a few hours after it started.

In the I Corps zone, the first phase line lay 4 miles (6.4 km) short of Suwon in territory already well examined. Milburn picked the 25th Infantry Division reinforced by the Turkish Brigade to make the advance. According to the scheme of moving in multiple columns, Kean sent the 35th Infantry up Routes 39 and 1 in the west, the Turks over a secondary road between Routes 1 and 17 and up 17 itself on the east. Out along the coast, a fifth column made up of the reconnaissance companies of the 25th Infantry Division and the 3rd Infantry Division screened the west flank of the advance. The initial phase line in the IX Corps zone traced the high ground just above Route 20 which included the area previously reconnoitered by Task Force Johnson. Coulter again ordered the 1st Cavalry Division to advance. Choosing to start in two columns, Gay sent the 8th Cavalry north on Route 55 toward Yangji-ri, where Johnson had met resistance on the earlier mission, and the 7th Cavalry Regiment up Route 13 into the territory above Ich'on. Screening wide to the flanks of each axis lest they bypass an enemy force, the columns on the 25th developed islands of opposition, mostly light, along or just below the first phase line. Sharp counterattacks hit the Turks on the secondary road east of Route 1 and the 8th Cavalry in the Yangji-ri area, but in both instances the PVA eventually broke contact. Captives identified only two divisions of the 50th Army across the 30 miles (48 km) front of the advance. This disclosure and the general pattern of light resistance indicated that the XIII Army Group had set out a counter-reconnaissance screen to shield defenses or assembly areas farther north. According to the prisoners, some positions would be found between 2–5 miles (3.2–8.0 km) farther north. This location would place them generally along the second phase line, which coincided with Suwon and a stretch of Route 20 in the west, then tipped northeast to touch the Han 10 miles (16 km) above Yoju.

On the 26th Milburn allowed the I Corps columns to move toward the second phase line while the IX Corps forces continued to clear the area along the first. Again against light, scattered opposition, the two columns of the 35th Infantry converged on Suwon and occupied the town and airfield by 13:00. Elsewhere in both Corps' zones the advance became a plodding affair as the troop columns searched east and west of their axes while driving north for short gains through tough spots of resistance. The PVA fought back hardest at Kumnyangjang-ni, which the Turks finally cleared at 19:30, and in the heights above Yangji-ri, where the 8th Cavalry lost 28 killed and 141 wounded while managing little more than to hold its position. The inability of the 8th Cavalry to move forced the 7th Cavalry to the east to stand fast along the first phase line just above Ich'on.

Gains on the 27th were short everywhere, more because of the requirements for close coordination and a thorough ground search than enemy resistance. The deepest I Corps' advance was on the left, where the 35th Infantry moved about 2 miles (3.2 km) above Suwon, while the leading Turk troops on the right got about 1 mile (1.6 km) above Route 20 into the T'an-ch'on River valley between Suwon and Kumnyangjang- ni. The heaviest fighting again occurred near Yangji-ri when the 5th Cavalry Regiment passed through the 8th and attacked west. Killing at least 300 PVA before reaching Kumnyangjang-ni, the 5th Cavalry then turned up Route 17 to reach the first phase line 1.5 miles (2.4 km) to the north. The 7th Cavalry, in the meantime, continued to hold near Ich'on. Captives taken during the day identified the third, and last, division of the 50th Army. The full deployment of the 50th and the absence of contact with any other army on the front supported the previous conclusion that the 50th had a screening mission. The intelligence rationale now taking shape assumed the Chinese units originally moving south of the Han to have started a gradual reduction of forward forces after determining generally the extent of the Eighth Army withdrawal. Behind the 50th Army screen, the remaining five armies of the XIII Army Group and the KPA I Corps apparently were now grouped just above and below the Han to rest and refurbish those PVA who had been in combat longest. To meet the probability of stronger resistance nearer the Han and to prepare for holding all ground gained, Ridgway on the 27th authorized Milburn to add the 3rd Division to the I Corps advance. Milburn gave General Robert H. Soule the Turkish Brigade zone east of Suwon and sent the Turks west to advance along the coast toward Inchon.

On the 28th Soule's 15th and 65th Infantry Regiments moved north astride Route 55 in the T'an-ch'on valley while the Turks shifted westward and joined the advance of the 35th Infantry. Against moderate, uneven resistance, the enlarged I Corps force reached within 2 miles (3.2 km) of the third phase line, which lay roughly halfway between the line of departure and the Han. To the east, where resistance in the Yangji-ri-Kumnyangjang-ni area had kept the IX Corps forces slightly behind the others, the 1st Cavalry Division received clearance on the 28th to advance to the second phase line. In the slow going imposed by careful screening and moderate opposition, the 5th Cavalry, moving along Route 17, reached the new objective while the 7th Cavalry, advancing above Ich'on in a wide zone astride Route 13, stopped for the night about 1 mile (1.6 km) short. The cavalrymen had encountered two new regiments, one athwart each axis of advance. These, as identified by PVA captured later during sharp night assaults against the 7th Cavalry, belonged to the 112th Division, 38th Army. Previously assembled in a rest area about 7 miles (11 km) above the front, the 112th had received sudden orders to move south and oppose the IX Corps advance.

In anticipation of heavier opposition to the IX Corps advance and to help hold the ground taken, Ridgway on the 28th instructed Coulter to commit the 24th Infantry Division. Coulter gave Major general Blackshear M. Bryan, who had replaced Church on 26 January, until the morning of the 30th to assemble the 24th behind the Ich'on-Yoju stretch of Route 20, whence the division was to advance on the Corps' right. Also on the 28th Ridgway again instructed Almond to maintain contact with IX Corps at Yoju, to block enemy moves below the Yoju-Wonju road, and to create diversions north of the road. X Corps' forces, having only recently checked the KPA advance east of Route 29 and reoccupied Wonju, were then just beginning to carry out similar instructions received on the 20th and 23rd. Enemy small arms, machine gun, mortar, and artillery fire, as well as minefields (though neither extensively nor well laid) kept gains short in both Corps zones on the 29th. Information supplied by prisoners taken during the day indicated that six divisions now opposed the advance. In the area between the west coast and Route 1, the KPA 8th Division stood before the Turks and the left flank units of the 35th Infantry. West to east between Routes 1 and 17, the Chinese 148th, 149th and 150th Divisions of the 50th Army opposed the 25th and 3rd Divisions and the left flank forces of the 1st Cavalry Division. From Route 17 eastward to the Han, the Chinese 113th and 112th Divisions of the 38th Army occupied positions in front of the remainder of the 1st Cavalry. Even though the opposition had tripled, the dotted pattern of PVA positions, mostly company-size, made clear that the Thunderbolt forces were still battling a counter-reconnaissance screen. There was now some doubt that a main enemy line would be developed below the Han. Prisoners made no mention of one but spoke mainly of regroupment. Neither did air observers, although they warned of prepared positions along Route 1 north to Yongdungp'o. Thus the refurbishing needs of the XIII Army Group might be great enough to keep it from establishing solid defenses south of the Han, or the group commander might have chosen not to stand with the river at his back.

Exercising a prerogative given in Ridgway's initial order, Milburn and Coulter on the 30th each added a ROKA regiment to their forces to help push through the enemy's tighter screen. With the opening of the 24th Division's advance on the IX Corps right on that date, the additions doubled the forces who had begun the reconnaissance five days earlier. Ground gains against the six PVA divisions nevertheless were hard won and measured in yards during the last two days of January. Milburn's forces barely gained the third phase line on the 31st and IX Corps forces reached little farther than the second.

=== General advance (30 January-4 February) ===
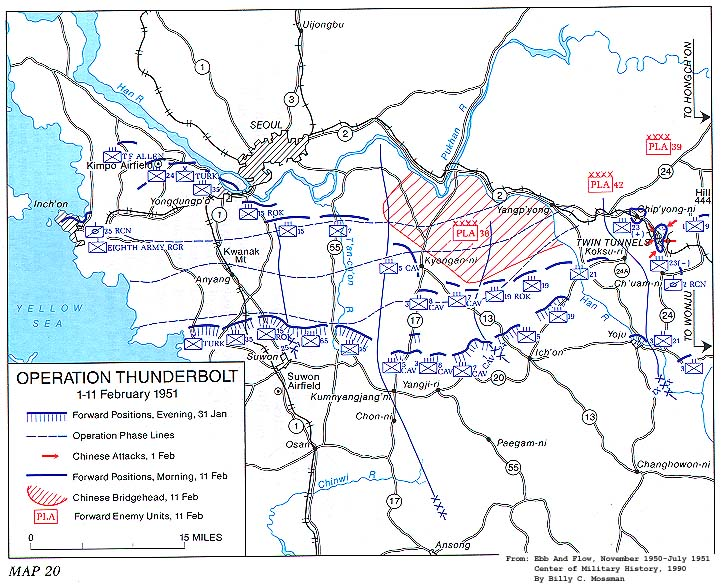
Operation Thunderbolt 1–11 February

Ridgway in the meantime converted his reconnaissance in force to a full-fledged attack. On the 30th, although his assault forces were some distance short of the fifth phase line, where he originally had planned to establish the remainder of I and IX Corps, he authorized Milburn and Coulter to bring their remaining units forward from Line D to hold the ground that had been gained. He did not release these forces for commitment in the advance, but he did take steps to ease the progress of the attack by instructing Milburn to plan a strong armored thrust through the coastal lowland on the west flank. Beyond this, he directed his operations officer to arrange a maximum air effort to isolate the battlefield south of the Han. He also began to widen the offensive. On the 30th he asked Almond and the ROKA chief of staff, General Chung Il-kwon, for recommendations on sending the X Corps and the ROKA III Corps forward in the fashion of Operation Thunderbolt. The purpose of the advance, he explained, would be to disrupt the KPA II and V Corps, which were still regrouping east of Route 29. On 2 February he ordered the ROKA I Corps to join the advance. The South Koreans were to move as far north as the east coast town of Gangneung.

When executed, the instructions Ridgway issued at the turn of the month would set the entire Eighth Army front in forward motion. In terms of ground to be gained and held, however, Ridgway intended that this carry his forces no farther than the lower bank of the Han in the west and a general line extending eastward from the Han River town of Yangp'yong through Hoengsong in the center of the peninsula to Gangneung on the coast. Only if PVA/KPA forces elected to withdraw above the 38th Parallel would he consider occupying a defense line farther north, and in this context he asked his staff near the end of January for recommendations on the most advantageous terrain lines for the Eighth Army to occupy during the spring and summer months. Otherwise, his current judgment was that the ground farther north, to and including the 38th Parallel, offered no defensible line worthy of the losses risked in attempting to take it. In limiting the Eighth Army's defense line in the west to the lower bank of the Han, Ridgway excluded Seoul as an objective. Occupying the city, in his estimation, would provide no military advantage but would, rather, produce the disadvantage of placing a river immediately in rear of the occupying forces. He had in fact directed his staff to prepare plans for crossing the Han and capturing the city. But, in line with his views, these plans were not to be carried out unless there arose an opportunity to destroy a major enemy force in which the retaking of Seoul was an incidental possibility. In any event, Ridgway entertained no thought of a prolonged effort to hold any line. Knowing that there would be no major reinforcement of the Eighth Army and assuming that enemy forces would keep trying to drive the Eighth Army out of Korea or destroy it in place, he saw no wisdom in accepting the heavy attrition that a static defense seemed certain to entail. In sum, he considered the permanent acquisition of real estate an impractical, if not unachievable, objective. In his mind, inflicting maximum losses on the Chinese and North Koreans, delaying them as long as possible if and when they attempted to advance, preserving the strength of his own forces, and maintaining his major units intact remained the only sound bases of planning, both for current operations and at longer range. Ridgway informed General Douglas MacArthur of these tactical concepts by letter on 3 February. MacArthur agreed that occupying Seoul would yield little military gain, although he believed that seizing the city would produce decided diplomatic and psychological advantages. On the other hand, he stressed to Ridgway the military worth of nearby Kimpo Airfield and the port of Inchon, both below the Han, and urged their capture. These facilities already had become objectives of Operation Thunderbolt. To Ridgway's larger concept, of holding along the Han River-Yangp'yong-Hoengsong-Gangneung line unless enemy forces voluntarily withdrew above the 38th Parallel, MacArthur responded in terms of developing the enemy's main line of resistance. If Ridgway developed the line below the Han, he should not attempt to break through it, but if he reached the Han without serious resistance, he should continue north until he had defined the enemy line or discovered that no line existed. As a general concept, MacArthur had in mind “to push on until we reached the line where a balance of strength was achieved which was governed by the relativity of supply." Ridgway, on the other hand, was primarily interested in holding whatever line best suited his basic plan of punishing the enemy as severely as possible at the least cost to his own forces. The difference in concept was perhaps subtle but was substantial enough to prompt Ridgway to bring up the matter again when MacArthur next visited Korea.

On 5 February X Corps and ROKA III Corps launched Operation Roundup in the central and eastern sectors of the ROKA/UN front. While X Corps continued to anchor the central front at Yoju, I and IX Corps continued their advance, pushing infantry and tanks supported by artillery and air strikes and, at the far west by naval gunfire, through isolated but stubborn defenses. The advances, slowed by careful lateral coordination and a full search of the ground, covered 2–6 miles (3.2–9.7 km) of the remaining 15 miles (24 km) to the Han. IX Corps registered the deepest gains as General Bryant Moore, now in command, pushed the 1st Cavalry and 24th Divisions up even with Milburn's 25th and 3rd Division. By 5 February the front traced a line running east and west through a point not far below Anyang on Route 1.

As a result of Ridgway's 31 January instructions to his operations officer to arrange air attacks to isolate the battlefield south of the Han, the daily army air requests to the Fifth Air Force came second only to close support. The requests called for round-the-clock interdiction with special attention to nighttime operations and with the intensity to prevent enemy forces from moving north or south of the Han. Partridge worked the army requests into his daytime armed reconnaissance program and stepped up a current night intruder effort along the Han from a point north of Kimpo Airfield eastward to a point near Yangp'yong. To prevent useless destruction in Seoul, Partridge instructed his pilots not to attack residential areas unless military targets were discovered within them. Judging from reported results over the first four days of February, the air attacks were something less than intensive. Night intruder sorties totaled 55, ranging from 6 on the 2nd to 22 on the 3rd. Targets reported destroyed or damaged included 50 troops, one antiaircraft gun, 14 vehicles, four railroad cars, 13 supply installations and 517 buildings.

The air effort had little effect on the gradual retraction of enemy forces from below the Han sensed late in January. The screen in front of the I and IX Corps by 5 February was one division stronger after the PVA 114th Division, appeared opposite the 24th Infantry Division on the IX Corps' right. The addition raised the divisions in contact to seven: the KPA 8th on the west, the three of the 50th Army in the center, and the three of the 38th Army on the east. Behind the screen, much of the KPA I Corps' reserve strength remained below the Han, the 47th Division occupying Inchon, the 17th Division located in the Seoul-Yongdungp'o area. But the XIII Army Group commander had reassembled almost all of his reserves above the river and had shifted the 42nd and parts of the 39th and 40th Armies eastward into the area above Yangpyong and Chipyong-ni. The 66th Army, whose troops had not moved below the Han, also was east and north of Seoul. As last known, it was assembled near Kapyong.

The newest prisoners and documents captured by I and IX Corps indicated that the PVA/KPA units still south of the Han would keep only light forces engaged and would deploy in depth for a leapfrog delaying action pending an enemy offensive around 8 February. The choice of date seemed to be tied either to the opening of the Chinese New Year on the 6th or to the third birthday of the KPA. The eastward shift of considerable Chinese strength into the territory above Yangpyong and Chipyong-ni, as did the earlier engagements at the twin tunnels, pointed to the Han River valley below Yangpyong as the likely main axis of an enemy advance. Heavy vehicular traffic also was sighted from the air, all of it moving south and over half of it moving from the Wonsan area towards Chuncheon. This shift could mean that the IX Army Group was rejoining the battle and was sending forces for employment in the central region. The indications that the enemy would employ only light forces and delaying tactics in front of I and IX Corps provided some assurance that the Thunderbolt forces would reach their Han objectives. The enemy concentration to the northeast raised the same danger of envelopment that had partially prompted the Eighth Army's withdrawal to line D a month earlier, but it was possible that Almond's Roundup advance would spoil the enemy buildup and that X Corps could at least protect IX Corps’ right flank.

=== Advance to the Han River (5-11 February) ===
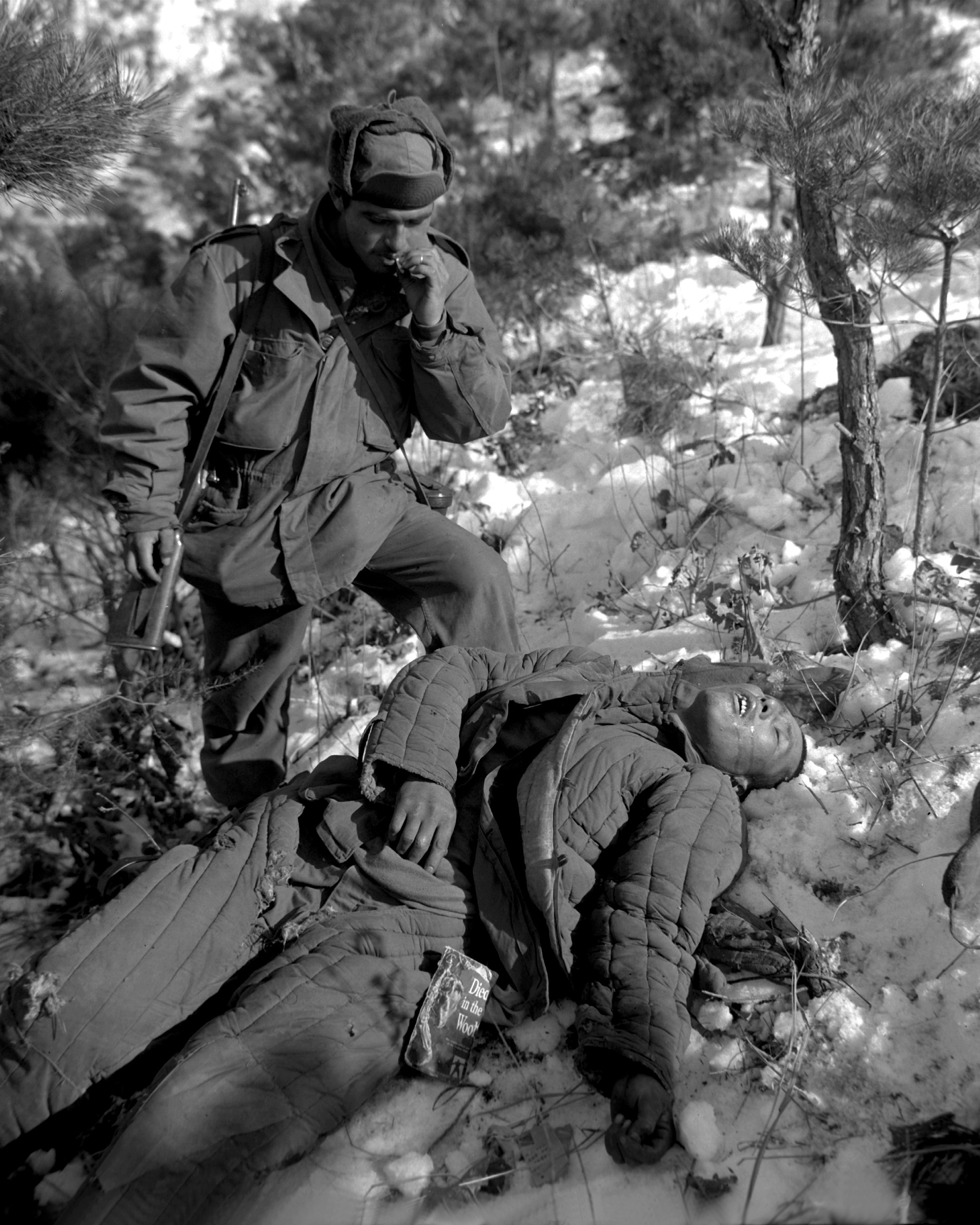
5th Regimental Combat Team soldier with a dead PVA soldier

At the resumption of the operation on 5 February, the two I Corps' assault divisions spearheaded their advance with tanks. Milburn previously had arranged but had not yet called for the strong armored thrust along the west coast ordered by Ridgway on 31 January. On Milburn's further order, two tank battalions, two infantry battalions, an artillery battalion, and a company of engineers were to assemble under Brigadier general Frank A. Allen, Jr., assistant commander of the 1st Cavalry Division. When called, Task Force Allen was to exploit any breakthrough that might occur, especially in the 25th Division's zone, and was particularly to block the lateral Inchon-Yongdungp'o road and cut off enemy forces located west of Kimpo Airfield. Between 5 and 8 February the smaller armored forces ranging ahead of the I Corps' methodical infantry advance were frequently delayed but seldom hurt by numerous minefields located on the curves and shoulders of roads and on bypasses around destroyed bridges. The mines, mostly wooden boxes with five to six pounds of explosives in each, were poorly laid and camouflaged. Most were visible, and mine detectors picked up the metallic igniters of those more deeply buried. Gains of 1–4 miles (1.6–6.4 km) through the 8th carried the 25th Division on the left within 5 miles (8.0 km) of the Inchon-Yongdungp’o road and took the forwardmost force of the 3rd Division at the right within 6 miles (9.7 km) of the Han itself. Beginning on the 6th, Milburn's forces captured troops from the KPA 47th Division in the area north and northeast of Anyang. By the 8th it appeared that all or part of the KPA 17th Division had relieved the 47th at Inchon; that the latter had joined the KPA 8th Division in holding back the I Corps, taking up positions near the center of the Corps' zone; and that the bulk of the 50th Army was sideslipping to the east.

The strongest enemy positions facing the I Corps on the 8th lay between Routes 1 and 55 across heights centered on Kwanak Mountain, due south of Seoul, where the KPA 47th Division had been identified. Since the Kwanak heights were the last defensible ground on the southern approaches to Seoul, their capture could climax the I Corps' advance to the Han. Ridgway emphasized this probability to Milburn at a meeting of Corps commanders on the 8th and urged him to push vigorously against the Kwanak defenses. Earlier, after learning of the 47th Division's entry on line, Ridgway asked Admiral C. Turner Joy to arrange an amphibious landing demonstration at Inchon to discourage further strengthening of the KPA screen and perhaps draw off some opposing forces. Joy dispatched ships from Sasebo, Japan, and from Pusan to join those already in Inchon waters for a demonstration on the 10th.

Snow and low-hanging clouds shut down air operations on the 9th but had little ill effect on the I Corps. The 25th Division captured Kwanak Mountain and, west of Route 1, advanced its infantry line within 2 miles (3.2 km) of the Inch'on-Yongdungp'o road. Armored forces from the division reconnoitered farther west and north within sight of Inchon and Yongdungp'o. On the Corps' right, the 3rd Division moved 2–3 miles (3.2–4.8 km) north, and a small armored column, Task Force Meyer, raced up Route 55 to become the first Corps' troops on the Han. Minefields harassed the advance, but assault forces otherwise consistently reported "no resistance." Milburn judged that the 50th Army forces previously in the 3rd Division's zone had withdrawn above the Han or out of the I Corps zone to the east. The KPA 8th and 47th Divisions, on the other hand, might have moved northwest to join the KPA 17th Division just above the Inchon-Yongdungp'o road to defend the Kimpo peninsula. As part of a plan to spoil any such effort, Milburn on the night of the 9th called for Task Force Allen to assemble behind the 25th Division. The division was to seize the Inchon-Yongdungp'o road by noon on the 10th, and was then to advance above the road in multiple columns to clear the Kimpo peninsula.

The landing demonstration at Inchon scheduled for the 10th now seemed likely to hinder rather than ease the I Corps advance. The 25th Division armored force that had looked at Inchon during the day had seen no enemy activity. The enemy's abrupt withdrawal apparently had included the Inchon garrison. Since a simulated landing might prompt the KPA to reoccupy Inchon and in turn make the port more difficult for the 25th Division to capture, the amphibious feint was canceled. The naval force assembled off Inchon, however, did plan to investigate the port on the 10th using a small party of ROK Marines.

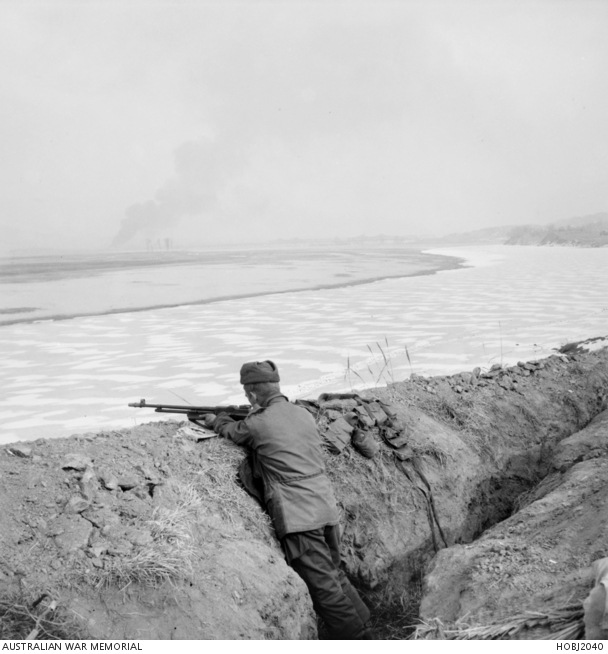
American sentry armed with a BAR overlooks the Han River

Snow showers through the morning of the 10th again cancelled most of I Corps' air support, but again with no ill effect. A total absence of resistance except for more antitank mines allowed the 25th Division to seize the Inchon-Yongdungp'o road an hour ahead of schedule. Under clearing skies, Task Force Allen moved into the Kimpo peninsula in two columns promptly at noon. The column on the east aimed first for Kimpo Airfield due north, then for the road leading northwest along the lower bank of the Han. The column on the west pushed up the center of the peninsula. The east force occupied the airfield without a contest in midafternoon, and by nightfall both columns were well up the peninsula, 8 miles (13 km) above the Inchon-Yongdungp'o road. One machine gun position, a short fire fight with the tail of an enemy column withdrawing across the frozen Han, 12 stragglers captured, and a little long-range fire were the only evidence of the KPA I Corps.

Behind Task Force Allen the 24th, 35th and attached ROKA 15th Regiment of the 25th Division moved to the Han between Kimpo Airfield and the edge of Yongdungp'o. In the only brush with enemy forces, a ROKA patrol that moved across the ice into the lower edge of Seoul was chased back by small arms fire. On the Corps' right, the 15th and 7th Infantry Regiments of the 3rd Division joined Task Force Meyer at the Han, moving onto the high ground between Yongdungp'o and Route 55. The only contact was an exchange of fire with enemy forces in position on the north bank of the river.

On the opposite Corps' flank, the 25th Division's reconnaissance company and the Eighth Army Ranger company had moved westward onto the cape holding Inchon in company with Task Force Allen’s noontime advance above the Inchon-Yongdungp'o road. Neither the Rangers, moving along the southern shore of the cape, nor the reconnaissance troops, heading directly for Inchon, met resistance. The reconnaissance company entered the city at 17:00, almost simultaneously with 80 ROK Marines sent ashore in three small powerboats by Task Force 95. As suspected, the KPA garrison was gone. The Rangers found a small spot of resistance on the 11th on a ridge 1 mile (1.6 km) south of Inchon. The Rangers and some of the reconnaissance troops eliminated it early in the afternoon. Task Force Allen meanwhile resumed clearing the Kimpo peninsula on the morning of the 11th, its troops in the van reaching the tip before noon. Immediately after Allen reported the peninsula clear, Milburn dissolved the task force and returned its components to their parent units now consolidating along the Han.

IX Corps gains from 5 through 8 February were slow and short. The resistance emulated that encountered by I Corps, but the terrain was much rougher. Methodical coverage of the ground consumed considerable time. As of the 8th, Moore nevertheless believed his Corps could reach the Han in a reasonable length of time. Under a wet sky on the 9th, Moore's forces met decidedly stiffer resistance, including counterattacks that forced some Corps units into short withdrawals. In sharp contrast to the virtual disappearance of enemy forces before I Corps on that date, the PVA opposite the IX Corps apparently planned to retain a bridgehead below the Han. The bridgehead area as defined by Moore's forces on the 9th and 10th was about 15 miles (24 km) wide, its west anchor located on the Han 9 miles (14 km) north of Kyongan-ni, its east anchor on the river 4 miles (6.4 km) below Yangpyong. The U-shaped forward edge dipped 4–7 miles (6.4–11.3 km) below the Han across a string of prominent heights between those points. By holding this position the PVA could prevent IX Corps observation of the Yangpyong area, already recognized as the possible starting point of an enemy attack down the Han valley. This theory gained support on the 10th when in clearing afternoon weather air observers sighted large numbers of enemy troops moving east on Route 2 along the north bank of the Han immediately behind the bridgehead area.

== Aftermath ==
While the UN forces established themselves on the southern bank of the Han River, the PVA/KPA forces moved their operations further east launching the Fourth Phase Campaign, achieving initial successes at the Battle of Hoengsong but then being stopped and routed at the Battle of Chipyong-ni. On 20 February Ridgway ordered Operation Killer to eliminate the PVA/KPA forces.

== See also ==
- Battle of Chipyong-ni
- Operation Killer
- Operation Ripper (Fourth Battle of Seoul)

== Bibliography ==
- Chae, Han Kook; Chung, Suk Kyun; Yang, Yong Cho (2001), Yang, Hee Wan; Lim, Won Hyok; Sims, Thomas Lee; Sims, Laura Marie; Kim, Chong Gu; Millett, Allan R. (eds.), The Korean War, vol. II, Lincoln, NE: University of Nebraska Press, ISBN 978-0-8032-7795-3
- Millett, Allan R. (2010), The War for Korea, 1950–1951: They Came From the North, Lawrence, KS: University Press of Kansas, ISBN 978-0-7006-1709-8
- Spurr, Russell (1988), Enter the Dragon: China's Undeclared War Against the U.S. in Korea 1950–51, New York, NY: Newmarket Press, ISBN 1-55704-008-7
- Zhang, Shu Guang (1995), Mao's Military Romanticism: China and the Korean War, 1950–1953, Lawrence, KS: University Press of Kansas, ISBN 0-7006-0723-4
- Bowers, William T. (2008), The Line: Combat in Korea, January – February 1951, Lexington, KY: University Press of Kentucky, ISBN 978-0-8131-2508-4
