= Bryant Moore =

United States Army general

Bryant Edward Moore
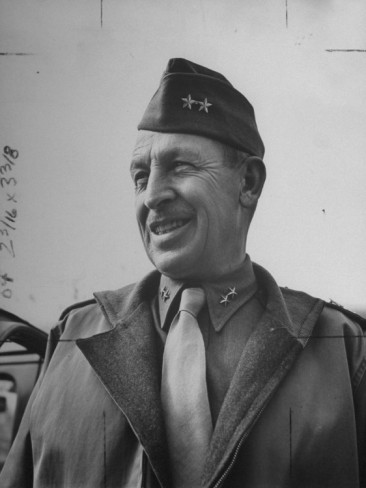
- Born: June 6, 1894; Ellsworth, Maine, United States
- Died: February 24, 1951 (aged 56) near Yeoju County, South Korea
- Military career
- Allegiance: United States
- Branch: United States Army
- Service years: 1917–1951
- Rank: Major General
- Service number: 0-8633
- Unit: Infantry Branch
- Commands: 164th Infantry Regiment; 8th Infantry Division; 88th Infantry Division; United States Military Academy; IX Corps
- Conflicts: World War I; World War II; Guadalcanal campaign; Siegfried Line campaign; Invasion of Germany; Korean War; Operation Thunderbolt; Operation Killer †
- Awards: Army Distinguished Service Medal (3); Silver Star (2); Legion of Merit; Bronze Star (2)

Major General Bryant Edward Moore (June 6, 1894 – February 24, 1951) was a United States Army officer who commanded the 8th Infantry Division during and after World War II, and the IX Corps in the Korean War.

== Biography ==
=== Early life and military career ===
Moore was born in Ellsworth, Maine, on June 6, 1894, to Nettie Haley Moore and Edward Grafton Moore. He had three siblings: John Leroy Moore, Margaret Moore Coolidge and James Moore. His father ran and then later owned Moore's Pharmacy on the corner of Water Street and Main Street in Ellsworth. The family home was on State Street, located on the hill across from the First Congregational Church. He graduated from Ellsworth High School and was educated at the Sorbonne in Paris, France, and at the United States Military Academy (USMA) at West Point, New York, where he graduated in August 1917.

Moore was fluent in French and served as an instructor in the Department of Modern Languages at the United States Military Academy (USMA) at West Point, New York, from 1925 to 1929. He graduated from the Infantry School Commanding Officers' Course in 1930 and the Command and General Staff School in 1939.

=== World War II ===
In the early days of World War II, Colonel Moore commanded the 164th Infantry Regiment on Guadalcanal. After promotion to the general officer rank of brigadier general, he later fought with the 104th Infantry Division as the assistant division commander (ADC). The 104th was commanded by Major General Terry Allen. He was later promoted again and commanded the 8th Infantry Division in Europe. Under his command, the division liberated the Neuengamme concentration camp. In late 1945 he commanded the 88th Infantry Division in Austria until it was inactivated in 1947.

=== Postwar ===
In the immediate post-war period, he commanded the occupation of Yugoslavia, holding Trieste, successfully keeping out Tito's troops. His wartime promotion to major general was made permanent on January 27, 1949. From 1949 until 1951, Moore was superintendent of the United States Military Academy at West Point.

During the Korean War, under General Matthew Ridgway, one of his classmates from the West Point class of 1917, he led the IX Corps in Operations Thunderbolt, Killer and Ripper. It was during these operations that Moore's helicopter crashed into the Han River near Yeoju. He died a few hours later from an apparent heart attack after having gotten help for the surviving pilot and crew, on February 24, 1951. The account of his service to America was entered into the United States Congressional Record by Maine Senator Margaret Chase Smith. Moore was promoted to the rank of four-star general posthumously.

He was buried in the cemetery of the U.S. Military Academy at West Point on the Hudson River in New York, his body being one of the first to be repatriated to American soil during a war.

Bryant Moore married the former Margaret "Peggy" King, also from Ellsworth, and they had two daughters, Margaret and Barbara.

Moore was well known for his diplomatic abilities as well as being fluent in French and an expert in military strategy and military science.

== See also ==
Military offices
Preceded by William G. Weaver	Commanding General 8th Infantry Division; February–November 1945	Succeeded by William M. Miley
Preceded by Maxwell D. Taylor	Superintendents of the United States Military Academy; 1949–1951	Succeeded by Frederick Augustus Irving
