= Operation Roundup (1951) =

Military operation during the Korean War

- Part of the Korean War
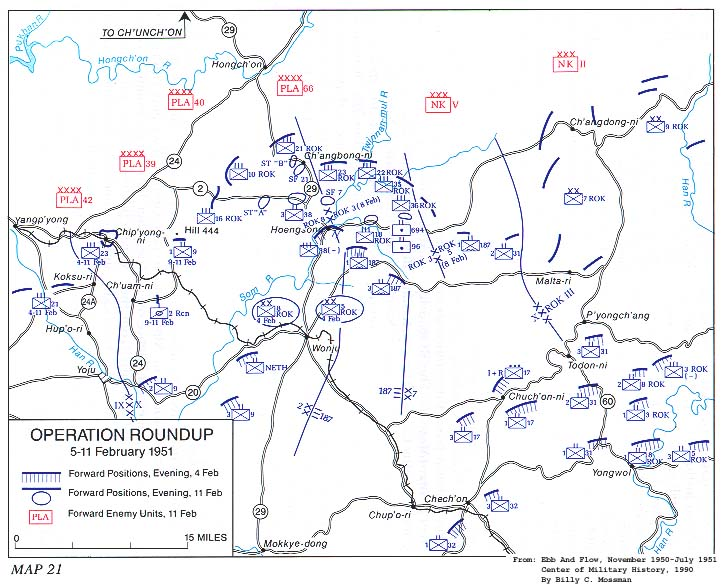
- Operation Roundup map
Date	5–11 February 1951
Location	Korean Peninsula
Result	See Aftermath

Belligerents
United Nations: United States; South Korea; France; Netherlands	China; North Korea

Commanders and leaders
(United Nations) Douglas MacArthur (United States) Edward Almond (First Republic of Korea) Yu Jae-hung	

Units involved
(United States) X Corps; (First Republic of Korea) 3rd Infantry Division; (First Republic of Korea) 5th Infantry Division; (First Republic of Korea) 8th Infantry Division; (United States) 2nd Infantry Division; (United States) 7th Infantry Division; (United States) 187th Airborne Regimental Combat Team; Netherlands Battalion; (French Fourth Republic) French Batailion de Coree; (First Republic of Korea) III Corps	(China) 42nd Army (North Korea) V Corps

Operation Roundup was an advance by United Nations Command (UN) forces during the Korean War that took place from 5 to 11 February 1951. While achieving initial success against limited opposition, it was brought to a halt by Chinese People's Volunteer Army (PVA) and North Korean Korean People's Army (KPA) forces at the Battle of Hoengsong.

== Background ==
When US X Corps commander General Edward Almond received a request from Eighth Army commander General Matthew Ridgway on 30 January for an X Corps - Republic of Korea Army (ROKA) III Corps operation similar to Operation Thunderbolt, he was in the process of extending X Corps' diversionary effort ordered earlier by Ridgway. Having achieved the Yoju-Wonju-Yongwol line against little opposition, Almond was planning a strong combat reconnaissance 15 miles (24 km) above this line. Searching that deep at Corps' center and right could apply pressure on the KPA V and II Corps concentrated above Hoengsong and Pyongchang. At the same time, the US 2nd Infantry Division, due to move north along the Corps' left boundary as far as Chip'yong-ni, 8 miles (13 km) east of Yangp'yong, could protect the right flank of US IX Corps as Operation Thunderbolt continued.

As shown by the Battle of the Twin Tunnels, the PVA appeared determined to retain control of Chip'yong-ni. They had good reason as the town was situated so that the force occupying it could control movements over Route 2 to the west, over Route 24 to the northeast, over Routes 24 and 24A below town, and thus through the Yangp'yong-Ch'ungju segment of the Han River valley stretching to the southeast behind it. Eighth Army possession of Chip'yong-ni, furthermore, would pose a threat of envelopment to enemy forces opposing US I and IX Corps below the Han River. For these same reasons Almond planned to seize Chip'yong-ni and incorporated this plan in his overall recommendations for an operation styled on Operation Thunderbolt. Also behind Almond's proposals were late January intelligence reports of a strong enemy force assembling around Hongcheon, at the intersection of Routes 24 and 29, 20 miles (32 km) northeast of Chip'yong-ni and 15 miles (24 km) north of Hoengsong. This force, apparently part of the KPA V Corps, could be preparing to advance southwest on Route 24 through Chip'yongni, then down the Han valley toward Yoju and Ch'ungju. Or the V Corps might again push forces south on Route 29 through Hoengsong toward Wonju. To spoil either move, Almond considered Hongcheon the proper main objective of an X Corps' attack. To disrupt both the KPA V Corps and II Corps, he outlined a coordinated X Corps-ROKA III Corps advance, Operation Roundup.

The current Corps' combat reconnaissance limit, generally the Chip'yong-ni-Hoengsong-Pyongchang line, was to be the line of departure for the operation and was to be occupied in a preliminary advance by the 2nd Infantry Division on the left, the 187th Airborne Regimental Combat Team (187th RCT) in the center, and the US 7th Infantry Division on the right. This advance would base US units far enough forward to support a thrust at Hongcheon, which Almond planned ROK forces would make. He proposed a flanking operation against Hongcheon by the ROKA 5th and 8th Infantry Divisions accompanied by artillery and armor drawn from the US units on the line of departure. From behind the 2nd Division on the left, part of the ROKA 8th Division was to advance north over Route 29 while the main body moved northwest to cut Route 24 roughly halfway between Chip'yong-ni and Hongchon, then turned northeast to hit Hongcheon itself. On the right, the ROKA 5th Division was to advance north through the mountains east of Route 29 through part of the area occupied by the KPA II Corps, then swing west against Hongch'on. The 2nd Division was to appoint one light artillery battalion, a medium battery, an automatic weapons battery and a motorized infantry battalion to move with and directly support the ROKA 8th Division. These units eventually constituted Support Force 21. The 7th Division was to furnish a similar Support Force 7 for the ROKA 5th Division. In each instance the artillery commander of the US division was to coordinate all artillery fire within his own zone and within the zone of the ROKA division he was supporting. Later, because control of the ROKA advance was centralized at Corps' headquarters and did not involve either US division headquarters per se, a question-warranted or not-would arise over who should order the displacement of these support forces. Five armored teams, each comprising a company of infantry and a platoon of tanks, also were designated, two by the 2nd Division, two by the 7th Division and one by the 187th RCT. Only three were used. Teams A and B from the 2nd Division were attached to the ROKA 8th Division at the outset of the advance; Team E from the 187th RCT later opened operations under the control of the Corps' armored officer.

By 5 February, the date set for opening the Hongchon strike, Almond expected ROKA III Corps to have come up even with X Corps’ line of departure. On the 5th ROKA III Corps should start forward through successive phase lines, coordinating each phase of movement with X Corps’ progress, to destroy KPA II Corps forces in zone and to protect X Corps' right flank. Ridgway approved Almond's plan on 1 February and made Almond responsible for coordinating the X Corps and ROKA III Corps attacks. Ridgway cautioned him, however, that for the remainder of Operation Thunderbolt his continuing mission of protecting the IX Corps' right flank would be X Corps' overriding tactical consideration. The next day Ridgway ordered ROKA I Corps to capture the east coast town of Gangneung in an advance coordinated with the progress of ROKA III Corps. X Corps’ preliminary advance to the line of departure was largely but not fully effected by the target date. At the Corps' west flank, the 23rd Infantry Regiment moved north of the Twin Tunnels and occupied Chip'yong-ni, surprisingly against no more than token opposition. At Corps' center, the 38th Infantry Regiment, now commanded by Colonel John G. Coughlin, occupied Hoengsong, and the 187th RCT the ground immediately southeast. The 7th Division at the Corps' right was not yet on the line. Its 17th and 31st Infantry Regiments were still approaching over the Chech'on-Pyongchang and Yongwol-Pyongchang roads. Behind the line traced by these clumps of Americans, the ROKA 5th and 8th Divisions were in final assemblies for the Hongcheon attack, one on either side of Route 29.

The assault divisions of ROK III Corps, the 7th and 9th, also were somewhat short of the line of departure on the 5th, yet near enough to satisfy Almond. The day before, at a Corps' commanders’ conference at Suwon, he notified Ridgway that he was ready to begin Operation Roundup. Ridgway that day ordered a westward shift of the X Corps-ROKA III Corps boundary to give the ROKA more of the territory north of Pyongchang. Hence, when Roundup opened at 08:00 on the 5th, General Yu Jae-hung's two divisions faced the bulk of the KPA II Corps while Almond's two assault units confronted the KPA V Corps in the Hoengsong-Hongch'on area.

== Advance ==
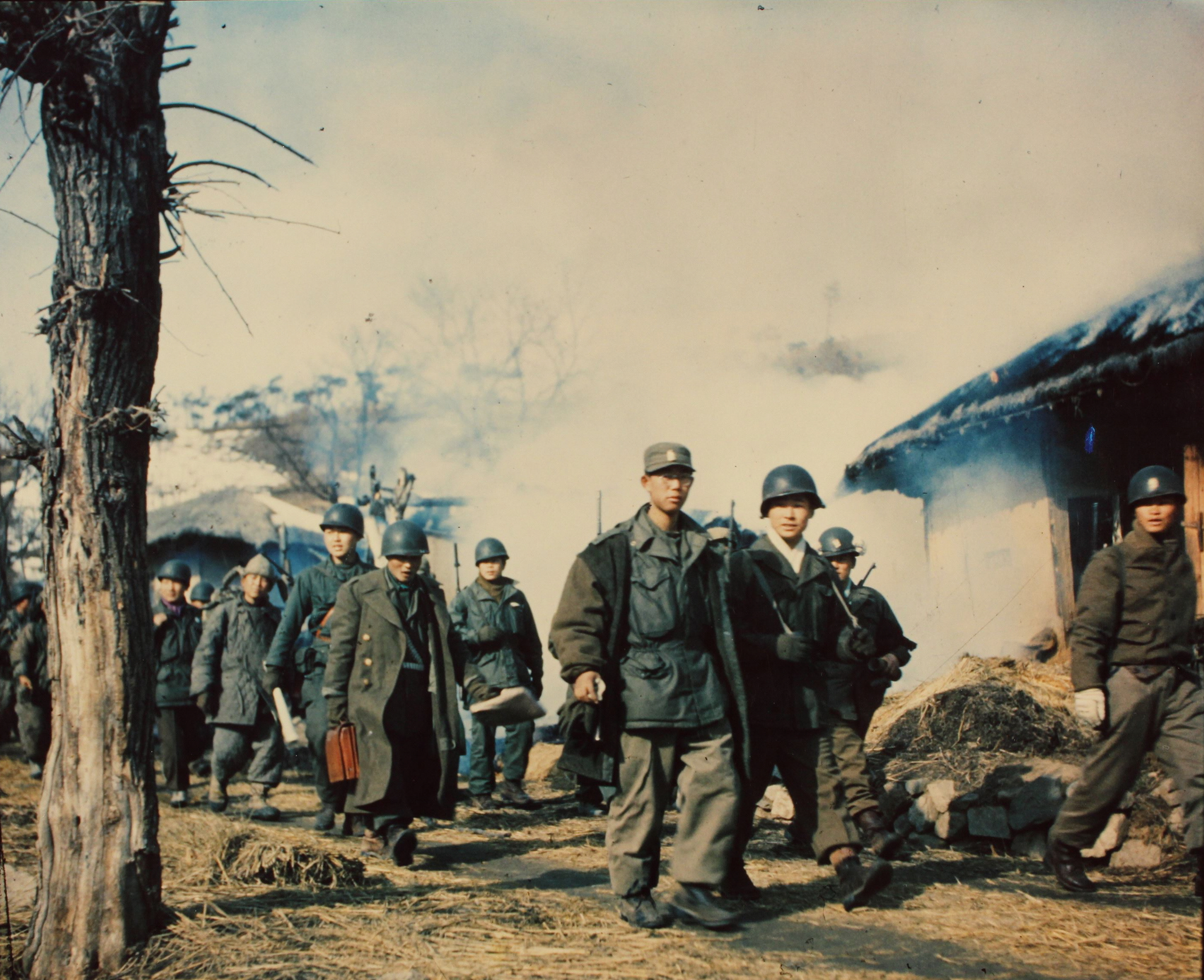
ROKA 5th Division troops pass a burning village on their way to support the right flank of the 187th RCT

Although the advance started in the Thunderbolt pattern, the harsh mountains ahead of X Corps and ROKA III Corps inhibited a complete ground search such as I and IX Corps were making. In X Corps' zone, the ROKA 5th and 8th Divisions advanced in multiple columns astride the best roads, tracks, or trails permitting passage through the convoluted ground. The ROKA troops climbed the higher ridges only when necessary to reduce an enemy position. The main routes for the 8th Division were Route 29 and a mountain road-actually a poor stretch of Route 2-reaching west from Route 29 at a point 3 miles (4.8 km) above Hoengsong. The 5th Division's principal paths followed the upstream traces of two small rivers east of Route 29. Physical contact between columns was rare, especially in the 8th Division zone where the columns diverged as they proceeded north and northwest. After three days Almond perceived that the attack on Hongcheon was as much a battle against terrain as against enemy opposition. Resistance did stiffen after an easy opening day, but the defending forces stayed to the tops of hills and allowed the ROKA to bring down heavy artillery concentrations and to maneuver around them. The ROKA assault forces, in Almond's estimation, had gained confidence over the three days, substantially from the presence and support of the US artillery and tanks. As of 8 February the success of the advance thus appeared largely to depend on overcoming terrain limitations on infantry maneuver, tank movement, and artillery forward displacement.

Against the combination of enemy hilltop defenses and difficult terrain, the two ROKA divisions by 8 February had moved 3–6 miles (4.8–9.7 km) northwest, north, and northeast of Hoengsong. Almond decided on the 8th that the ROKA 8th Division's main effort to envelop Hongcheon from the west could be eased by committing another division. Currently, one of the 8th Division's regiments was moving north astride Route 29 while the other two were pushing through rough ridges to the northwest to cut Route 24. If Almond set another force in the center to move up Route 29, the 8th Division could make its enveloping move in full strength. Almond mistrusted his own reserve division, the ROKA 2nd Infantry Division, still weak from losses in the PVA New Year's Offensive. He chose not to reduce the strength of the US 2nd or 7th Division defenses along the line of departure, and he could not use the 187th RCT, because on 4 February Ridgway had notified him that they were scheduled to be taken off the line and that he was not to give them an offensive role. On the 8th Almond asked Ridgway for the ROKA 3rd Infantry Division, then in ROKA III Corps' reserve. Ridgway hesitated to take Yu's only reserve. On the other hand, Yu's assault divisions were reporting good progress through light to moderate resistance. Moving astride Route 60 from Pyongchang toward Ch’angdong-ni, 17 miles (27 km) to the north, the ROKA 7th Division had advanced one regiment within 3 miles (4.8 km) of the latter town. On the Corps' right, the ROKA 9th had moved above Chong-son through the upper Han valley for almost 20 miles (32 km). Since Yu could get help from the US 7th Division, whose 31st Regiment was now following the ROKA 7th Division above Pyongchang, Ridgway agreed to the transfer of the ROKA 3rd Division for the duration of the operation and Almond instructed the division to be in position for an advance above Hoengsong on the morning of the 11th.

While Almond was arranging to assist the ROKA 8th Division's northwestward swing, a greater problem arose east of Route 29. On 7 February the ROKA 5th Division, then advancing with two regiments forward, had encountered a KPA force estimated at 4,000. The division commander planned to eliminate the KPA on the 8th by bringing up his reserve regiment on the left for an attack to the east concurrent with attacks to the north and west by the center and right regiments. But his plan was spoiled when the right regiment, the ROKA 27th, was hit on the 8th by hard KPA attacks from the northwest and northeast. One battalion was scattered, and the remainder of the regiment was forced to withdraw. The regiment continued to receive attacks until the early morning hours of the 9th when the KPA pulled away to the northwest. The alarming note was that some or all of these forces had come out of the ROKA III Corps' zone. The KPA II Corps apparently was shifting forces westward to join V Corps in opposing X Corps. Almond was obliged to prevent further incursion on his right if the envelopment of Hongcheon was to succeed. On the 10th he directed the ROKA 5th Division to advance and establish blocking positions facing northeast near the Corps' boundary generally on the ground held by the ROKA 27th Regiment when it was attacked, some 13 miles (21 km) northeast of Hoengsong. Along with this move, he ordered the US 7th Division to send a battalion northwest out of the area above Pyongchang toward a ground objective 16 miles (26 km) due east of Hoengsong. This advance, he intended, would drive KPA forces located near the Corps' boundary into the path of the ROKA 5th Division's attack. Almond also ordered a battalion of the 187th RCT to move into position 9 miles (14 km) east of Hoengsong to deepen the east flank blocking effort at the right rear of the 5th Division. The ROKA 3rd Division, assembling just east of Hoengsong, was now to become the right arm of the maneuver against Hongcheon. Behind the protection of the 5th Division to the east, the 3rd Division was to move north in two columns through the heights east of Route 29 to a point due east of Hongcheon. There the right column was to face east in blocking positions while the left column turned west toward the town. Both moves, the 5th Division's blocking effort at the right and the 3rd Division's attack to the north, were to begin at noon on the 1lth. Support Force 7 was now to support the 3rd Division. Almond directed the 187th RCT to place its 674th Field Artillery Battalion in direct support of the 5th Division and ordered the 96th Field Artillery Battalion, a Corps' unit previously assigned to reinforce the fires of Support Force 7, to switch its reinforcement to the 674th.

Meanwhile, amid the adjustments in the X Corps' zone between 8 and 11 February, ROKA III Corps continued to gain ground. The 7th Division fought through Ch'angdong-ni and by evening of the 11th was echeloned left in regimental positions oriented north and northwest from 3 miles (4.8 km) above Ch'angdong-ni to 7 miles (11 km) below the town. On the Corps' right, the 9th Division pushed 9 miles (14 km) up the Han valley, making contact with the ROKA I Corps’ Capital Division in the high peaks rising east of the Han. Resistance was light on the 8th and 9th, but stiffened over the next two days when Yu's forces ran into parts of the KPA 31st Division. Obviously, not all of the KPA II Corps had shifted west into the X Corps zone. ROKA I Corps, moving up the east coast under Ridgway's 2 February order to seize Gangneung, more than achieved its objective. With naval gunfire support from Task Force 95 in the Sea of Japan and against fainthearted opposition by the 69th Brigade, a unit of the KPA III Corps that disappeared altogether on the 8th, the Capital Division advanced in consistently long and rapid strides. In the Taebaek Mountains rising west of the coastal road, one regiment by evening of the 11th held positions 5 miles (8.0 km) above Route 20, which meandered west and southwest out of Gangneung to Wonju. The remainder of the division moving over the coastal road occupied Gangneung, then Chumunjin 11 miles (18 km) further north, and at nightfall on the 11th had forces in position 3 miles (4.8 km) above the latter town.

Gains in the X Corps' zone remained much shorter. East of Route 29, the ROKA 3rd Division by dark on 11 February advanced through light opposition to positions 5 miles (8.0 km) above Hoengsong. Next east, the ROKA 5th Division reoriented and moved through moderate resistance within 4 miles (6.4 km) of its east flank blocking positions. The 1st Battalion, 187th RCT, meanwhile went into the position designed to place it at the right rear of the 5th Division; from the Pyongchang area the 2nd Battalion, 31st Infantry, easily seized its terrain objective to the northwest in the effort to drive KPA forces into the 5th Division's path. The ROKA, however, were still some distance from their objectives. On and west of Route 29, the 8th Division found lighter resistance, KPA forces tending to withdraw before actually obliged to do so. By nightfall on the 11th the 21st Regiment stood astride Route 29 9 miles (14 km) north of Hoengsong. To the west, the 10th and then the 16th Regiments held positions 10 miles (16 km) northwest of Hoengsong along the crest of the mountains between Hoengsong and Route 24. A 3 miles (4.8 km) gap separated the 21st and 10th Regiments, and about 1 mile (1.6 km) of open space stood between the 10th and 16th Regiments. 2 miles (3.2 km) behind the 21st Regiment, the tanks and infantry of Support Team B, which had been attached to the ROKA regiment, were assembled along Route 29. Another 1 mile (1.6 km) down the road, the infantry and artillery of Support Force 21 occupied positions near the town of Ch'angbong-ni. Below Support Force 21, the 3rd Battalion, 38th Infantry, on Almond's order had moved up from Hoengsong into a blocking position at the junction of Route 29 and the mountain road leading west. Support Team A, whose tanks and infantry were attached to the 16th Regiment, was 2 miles (3.2 km) further out on the mountain road. Still further out, between Support Team A and the front of the 16th Regiment, which lay across the mountain road, were the ROKA 20th and 50th Field Artillery Battalions and the command posts of both the 10th and 16th Regiments. The nearest of the 2nd Division defenses around Chip'yong-ni now stood 4 miles (6.4 km) southwest of the 16th Regiment. After securing Chip'yong-ni before the opening of the operation, the 23rd Infantry Regiment had established a perimeter around the town, and Colonel Paul L. Freeman Jr. had run patrols east, west, and north. The patrol encounters with enemy forces were mostly minor, but by 9 February one particularly strong position was discovered on Hill 444 some 4 miles (6.4 km) east of Chip'yong-ni. On the 9th Freeman sent a battalion east and the 1st Battalion, 9th Infantry Regiment, came north from the Yoju area to reduce the enemy strongpoint. The latter battalion occupied the height on the 11th and thus held the 2nd Division position closest to the ROK 8th Division.

== Aftermath ==
Given continued reports of eastward PVA shifts and taking them as clear signs of an imminent PVA offensive in the west-central region, Ridgway late on 11 February instructed Almond to patrol but not to attempt further advances toward Route 24 in either the US 2nd Infantry Division or ROKA 8th Infantry Division zones until US IX Corps had reduced the PVA's Han River bridgehead below Yangp'yong. To move forward while IX Corps was still held up could isolate and overextend Almond's leftmost units in the area where the PVA 39th, 40th, 42nd and 66th Armies were obviously massing.

As predicted by Eighth Army intelligence, on the night of 11 February the PVA XIII Army Group opened an attack towards Hoengsong. In shifting forces eastward they had moved the 66th Army from Kapyong to Hongcheon, whence one division struck south along Route 29. From start points near Route 24 between Hongcheon and Chip'yong-ni, a division of the 40th Army and one of the 39th Army joined the push on Hoengsong by attacking southeast. In the path of these initial attacks lay the ROKA 8th Infantry Division.
