= Claude Birkett Ferenbaugh =

United States Army general

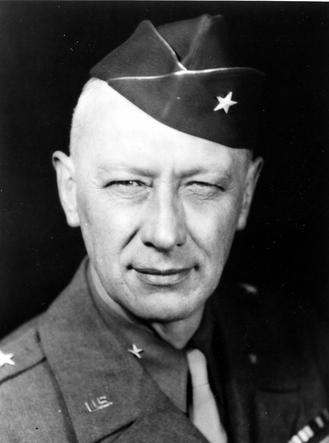
- Ferenbaugh as a brigadier general, probably when he was commander of the Military District of Washington
- Born: 16 March 1899; Dresden, New York
- Died: 10 September 1975 (aged 76) Washington, D.C.
- Buried: Arlington National Cemetery
- Allegiance: United States
- Branch: United States Army
- Service years: 1918–1958
- Rank: Lieutenant general
- Commands: Military District of Washington; Schofield Barracks, Hawaii; 7th Infantry Division
- Conflicts: World War I World War II; Korean War
- Awards: Distinguished Service Medal; Silver Star; Legion of Merit; Bronze Star; Air Medal; Purple Heart

Claude Birkett Ferenbaugh (16 March 1899–10 September 1975) was a United States Army lieutenant general. He served as the operations officer of the U.S. II Corps in Africa during World War II and commanded the 7th Infantry Division during the Korean War.

== Early life and start of military career ==
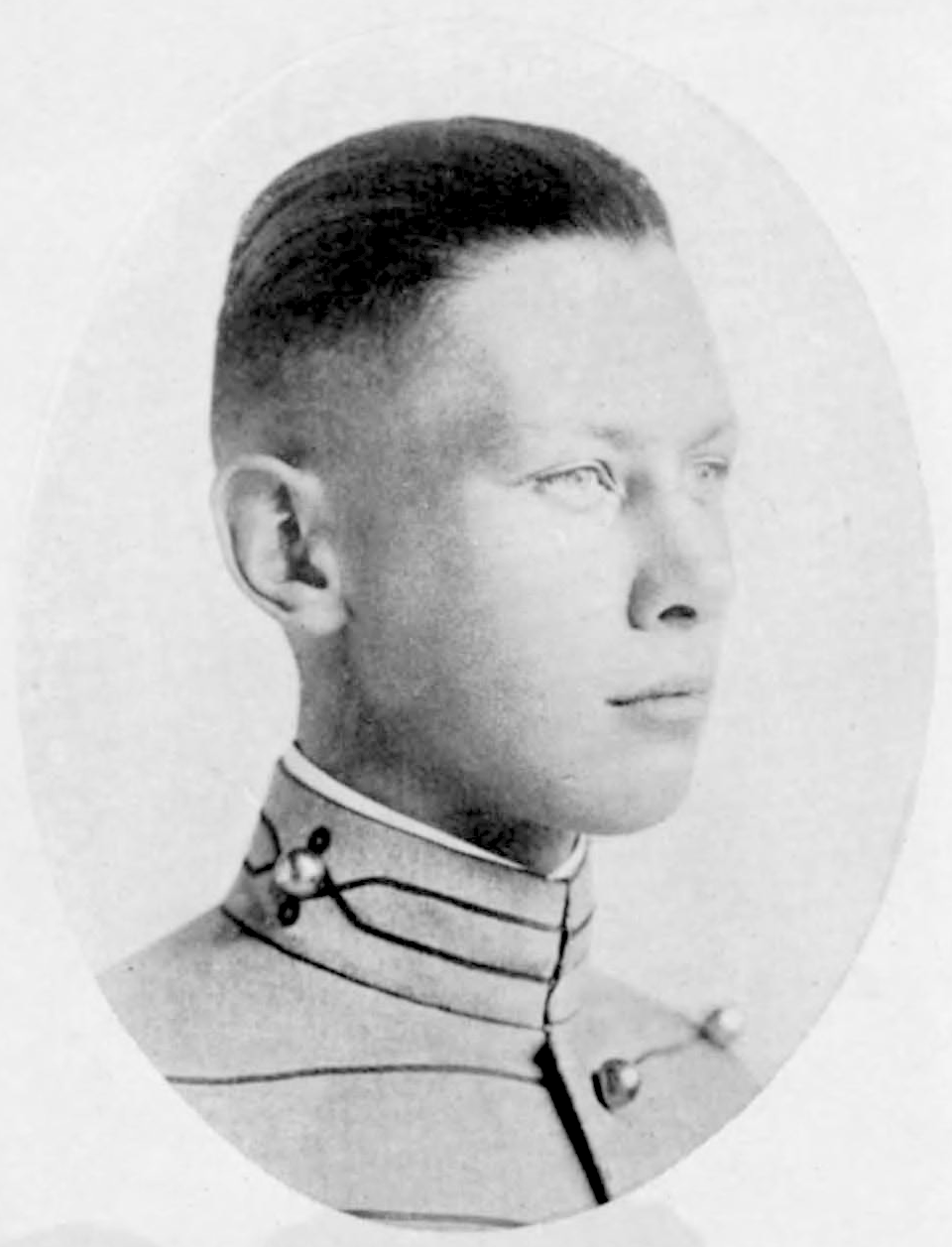
As a West Point cadet

Ferenbaugh was born in Dresden, New York, on 16 March 1899. He attended the United States Military Academy, graduating in 1918 and receiving his commission as a second lieutenant of infantry.

== World War I ==
Having graduated from West Point in November, Ferenbaugh arrived in Europe too late to take part in World War I combat. Like many other junior officers in the same circumstances, he carried out an observation tour of European battlefields, including visits to France, Belgium and Germany.

== Post-World War I ==
Ferenbaugh remained in the Army after the war ended. He was a 1920 graduate of the Infantry Officer Basic Course, afterwards serving throughout the United States and overseas, including assignments at Fort Benning, Georgia, Vancouver, Washington, and in Hawaii and the Philippines. In 1932, Ferenbaugh graduated from the Signal School Command Officer Course. Ferenbaugh graduated from the Command and General Staff College in 1937, and from the Army War College in 1940.

== World War II ==
After service on the General Staff at the War Department, in 1943 Ferenbaugh was assigned as operations officer, G-3 of the U.S. II Corps, and was responsible for planning and overseeing execution of combat actions during the North African Campaign. After his assignment with II Corps, Ferenbaugh served as assistant division commander of the 83rd Infantry Division.

== Post-World War II ==
Ferenbaugh's service continued after World War II, including assignment as commander, of the Military District of Washington, chief of staff for the Operation Sandstone atomic tests, and commander at Schofield Barracks, Hawaii. He also served as president of the National Infantry Association in the late 1940s.

== Korean War ==
In 1951, Ferenbaugh was named commander of the 7th Infantry Division. His assignment also included membership on the Allied Negotiating Team that negotiated peace terms with North Korea.

== Post-Korean War ==
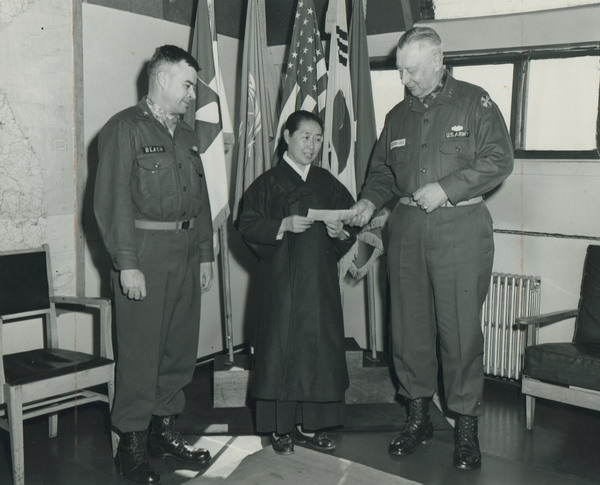
LTG Claude B. Ferenbaugh (right), deputy Eighth Army commander, presents a check for $595 to Mrs. On Soon Whang, director of the Orphans' Home of Korea, Cheju Island. Chief of staff BG Dwight E. Beach observes. The check is the semi-annual interest on the orphanage's perpetual support trust fund. Stars and Stripes, 1 March 1955

From July 1953 to December 1954, Ferenbaugh served as chief of staff for U.S. Army, Europe. In 1955, he returned to South Korea as deputy commander of the Eighth United States Army, remaining in this assignment until his 1958 retirement.

== Awards and decorations ==
Ferenbaugh received multiple awards of the Distinguished Service Medal. He also received the Silver Star twice, the Legion of Merit three times, the Bronze Star twice, two awards of the Air Medal and the Purple Heart.

== Retirement and death ==
In retirement, General Ferenbaugh resided in Washington, D.C. He died at his home on 10 September 1975, and was buried at Arlington National Cemetery, Section 7, Site 8083 A, RH.
