= 5th Infantry Division (South Korea) =

- 5th Infantry Division insignia
- Active: 29 April 1948 – present
- Country: South Korea
- Branch: Republic of Korea Army
- Type: Division
- Role: Infantry
- Part of: V Corps (Republic of Korea)
- Garrison/HQ: Yeoncheon, Gyeonggi Province
- Nickname: "The Key"
- Engagements: Korean War: Battle of Bloody Ridge

Commanders
- Notable commanders: Park Chung Hee; Chae Myung-shin

The 5th Infantry Division (Korean: 제5보병사단; Hanja: 第五步兵師團), also known as The Key Division (열쇠부대) is a unit of the Republic of Korea Army. It is a frontline division that protects the GOP and GP of Yeoncheon County, Gyeonggi Province.

The division was created on 29 April 1948, participated the Korean War and it is one of the first units of the South Korean Army.

== Structure ==
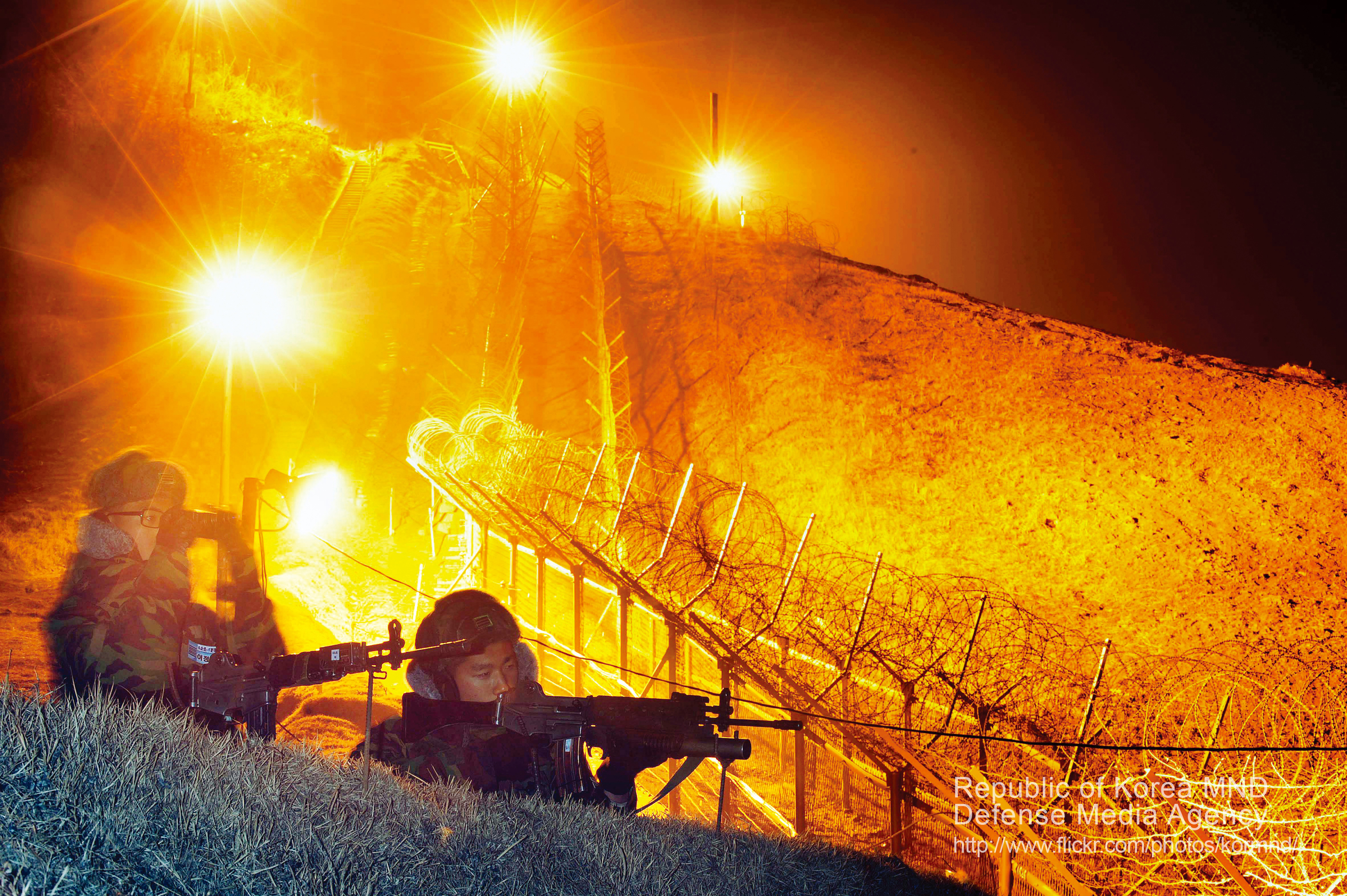
Soldiers of the 5th Infantry Division guarding the DMZ.

- Headquarters:
  - Headquarters Company
  - TOW Company
  - Recruiting Company
  - Air Defense Company
  - Engineer Battalion 'BULL'
  - Maintenance Battalion 'SEA EAGLE'
  - Supply & Transport Battalion
  - Reconnaissance Battalion 'PEGASUS'
  - Armored Battalion
  - Signal Battalion
  - Military Police Battalion
  - Medical Battalion
  - Chemical Battalion
- 27th Infantry Brigade 'LEOPARD'
- 35th Infantry Brigade 'LION'
- 36th Infantry Brigade 'EAGLE'
- Artillery Brigade 'WHITE BEAR'
  - 195th Field Artillery Battalion
  - 196th Field Artillery Battalion 'YELLOW DRAGON'
  - 205th Field Artillery Battalion
  - 988th Field Artillery Battalion
