= James H. Polk =

American general (1911–1992)

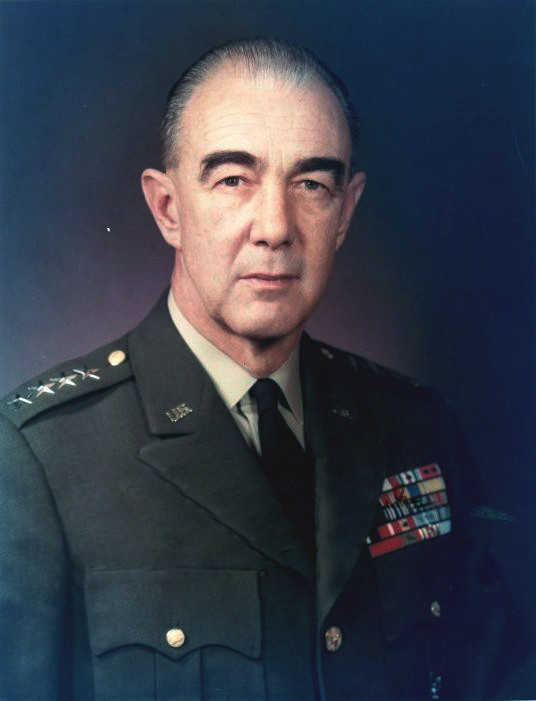
- General James Hilliard Polk
- Born: 13 December 1911; Batangas, Philippines
- Died: 18 February 1992 (aged 80); El Paso, Texas, United States
- Burial place: Arlington National Cemetery
- Relatives: James K. Polk (cousin), Leonidas Polk (cousin), James G. Polk (cousin)
- Military career
- Allegiance: United States
- Branch: United States Army
- Service years: 1933–1971
- Rank: General
- Commands: United States Army Europe; 4th Armored Division; 3rd Mechanized Cavalry Group
- Conflicts: World War II; Korean War
- Awards: Army Distinguished Service Medal; Silver Star (2); Legion of Merit (3); Bronze Star Medal

James Hilliard Polk (13 December 1911 – 18 February 1992) was a United States Army four-star general who served as commander in chief, United States Army Europe from 1967 to 1971. He was one of the last senior commanders in the army to have served in the horse cavalry.

== Military career ==
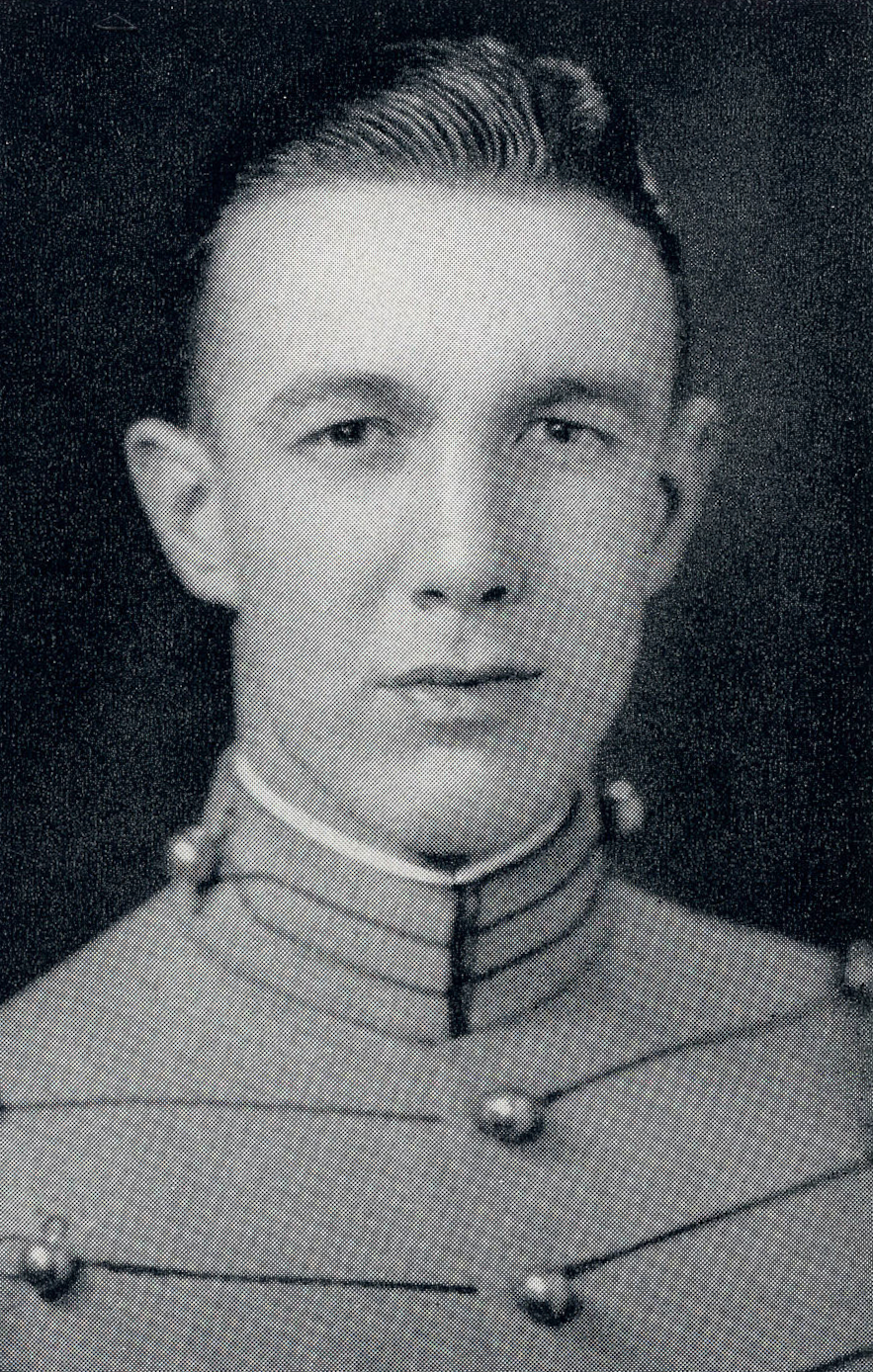
Polk as a United States Military Academy cadet c. 1933

Polk was born at Camp McGraw in Batangas in the Philippines on 13 December 1911, to Colonel Harding Polk, and the former Esther Fleming.

Polk graduated from the United States Military Academy in 1933 and was commissioned in the cavalry. Prior to World War II, he served in two cavalry regiments and attended the basic and advanced courses at the cavalry school. In 1939 at the National Horse Show at Madison Square Garden, he won first place in the Individual Military and Police Jumping event.

At the outbreak of World War II, Polk was assigned to West Point as a tactical officer. In 1943, he attended a shortened general staff course at Fort Leavenworth. After graduation, he joined the 106th Cavalry Group at Camp Hood, Texas, as a squadron commander, and later as regimental executive officer. In Europe, the group fought in the hedgerows of Normandy and the breakout from Saint-Lô.

In early September 1944, Polk assumed command of the 3rd Mechanized Cavalry Group, then in combat near Metz, France, and commanded it until the end of the war. During this time, the unit was known as "Task Force Polk", and spearheaded many advances by General Walton Walker's XX Corps, part of General George S. Patton, Jr.'s Third United States Army.

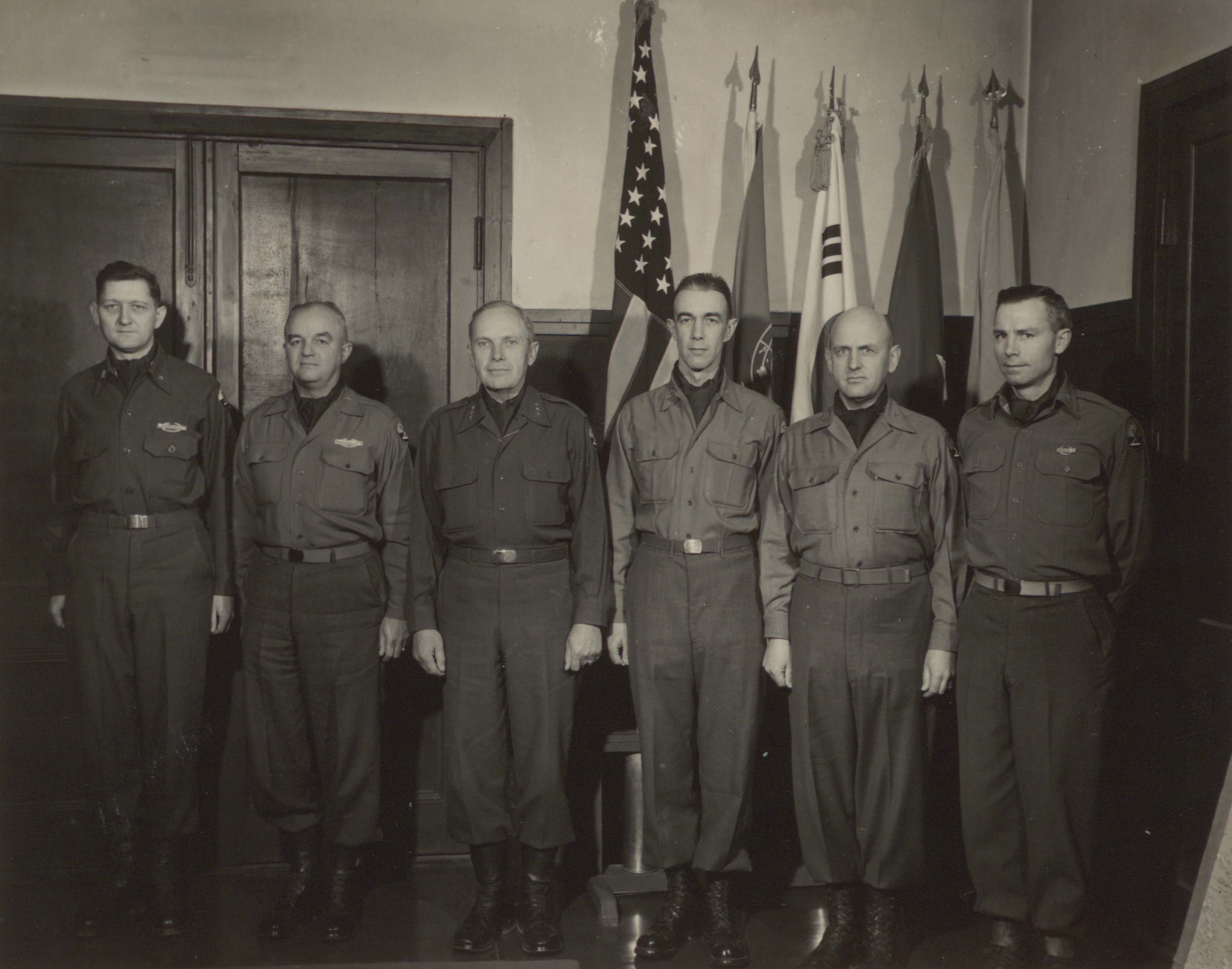
Edward Almond (third from left) and X Corps staff officers Edward L. Rowny, John S. Guthrie, James H. Polk, Richard H. Harrison and Frank T. Mildren.

After brief occupation duty in Germany at the end of World War II, Polk returned to the United States and became chief of Tactics at the Ground General School at Fort Riley, Kansas, and later attended the Armed Forces Staff College. In 1948, he went to Tokyo in the G-2 (Intelligence) section of the United States Far East Command for the next three years.

During the Korean War, Polk was assigned as G-2 to General Ned Almond's X Corps and later as G-2 to General James Van Fleet's 8th Army, and participated in three campaigns. In August 1951, he returned stateside to attend the National War College, and was later assigned as an instructor at the Army War College. He was then made chief of staff of the 3rd Armored Division at Fort Knox, participating in their move to Germany. In July 1956, he was promoted to brigadier general and became assistant division commander.

Following an assignment as assistant chief of staff for Plans and Operations, Land Forces Central Europe, at NATO Headquarters at Fontainebleau under General Dr. Hans Speidel, Polk returned to the U.S. and became director of the Policy Planning Staff in the Office of the assistant secretary of Defense for International Security Affairs.

Upon promotion to major general, Polk took command of the 4th Armored Division, followed by being the U.S. commandant in Berlin from 2 January 1963 to 31 August 1964, during a time of increased Cold War tensions. In this role, he showed John F. Kennedy the Berlin Wall at Checkpoint Charlie on the president's visit to West Berlin in June 1963.

Polk became commander of V Corps on 1 September 1964, and in 1966 returned to CONUS to become assistant chief of staff for Force Development. He returned to Europe at the end of that year, first as deputy commander in chief, United States Army Europe, and six months later was promoted to four-star general as commander in chief, United States Army Europe. He retired from active duty on 1 April 1971.

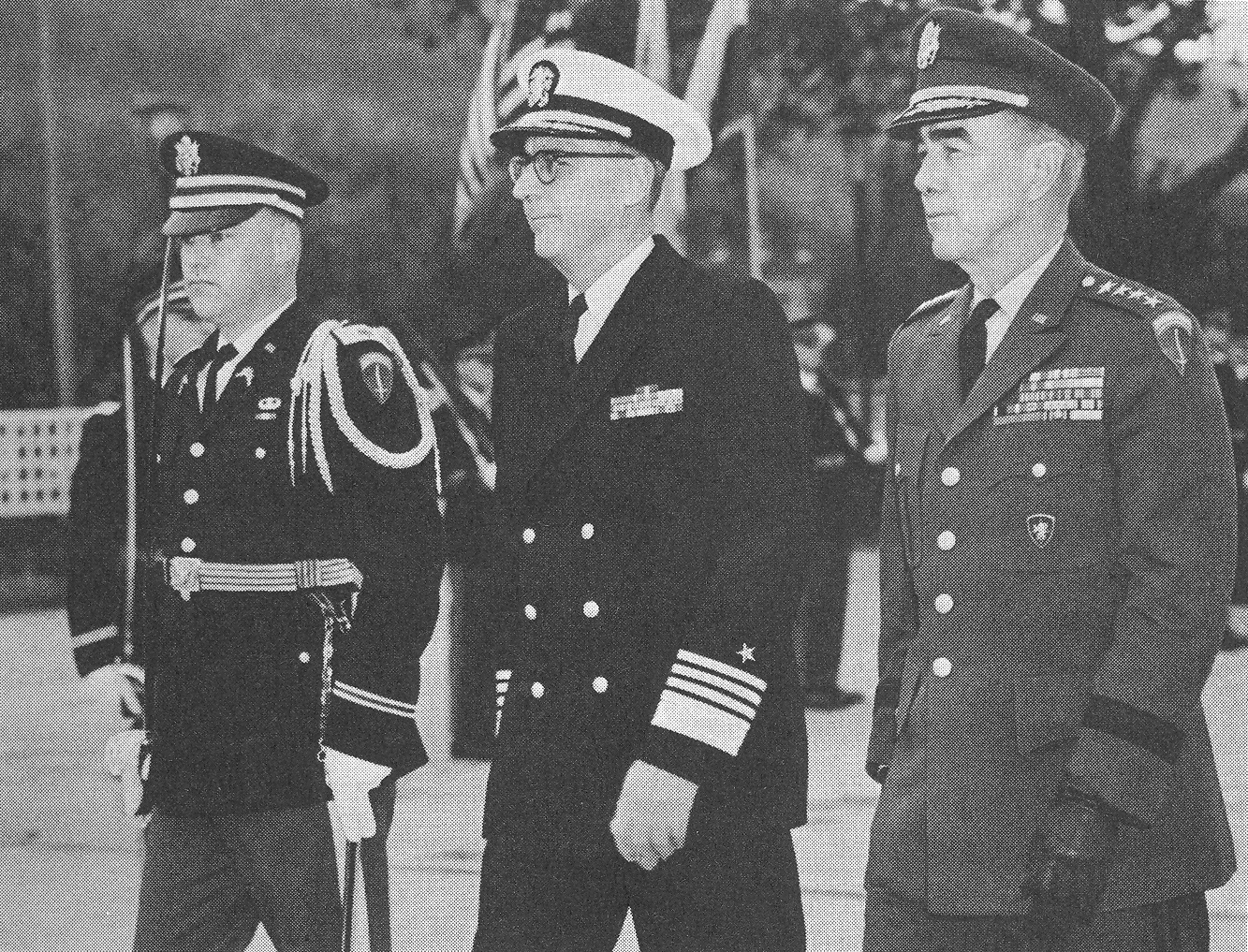
Polk (right) welcoming Admiral Waldemar F. A. Wendt (center) to Seventh Army and USAREUR Headquarters in Heidelberg, Germany in 1968

== Decorations ==
Polk's awards and decorations included the Army Distinguished Service Medal, the Silver Star with Oak Leaf Cluster, the Legion of Merit with two Oak Leaf Clusters, the Bronze Star Medal, the Air Medal, the American Defense Service Medal, the American Campaign Medal, the European-African-Middle Eastern Theater Medal, the World War II Victory Medal, the National Defense Service Medal with bronze star device, the Korean Service Medal with three campaign stars, the Armed Forces Expeditionary Medal, the French Croix de Guerre, the French Legion of Honor, the Bundeswehr Cross of Honor, the United Nations Korea Service Medal, the Korean Presidential Unit Citation, and the Central Army Group Identification Badge.

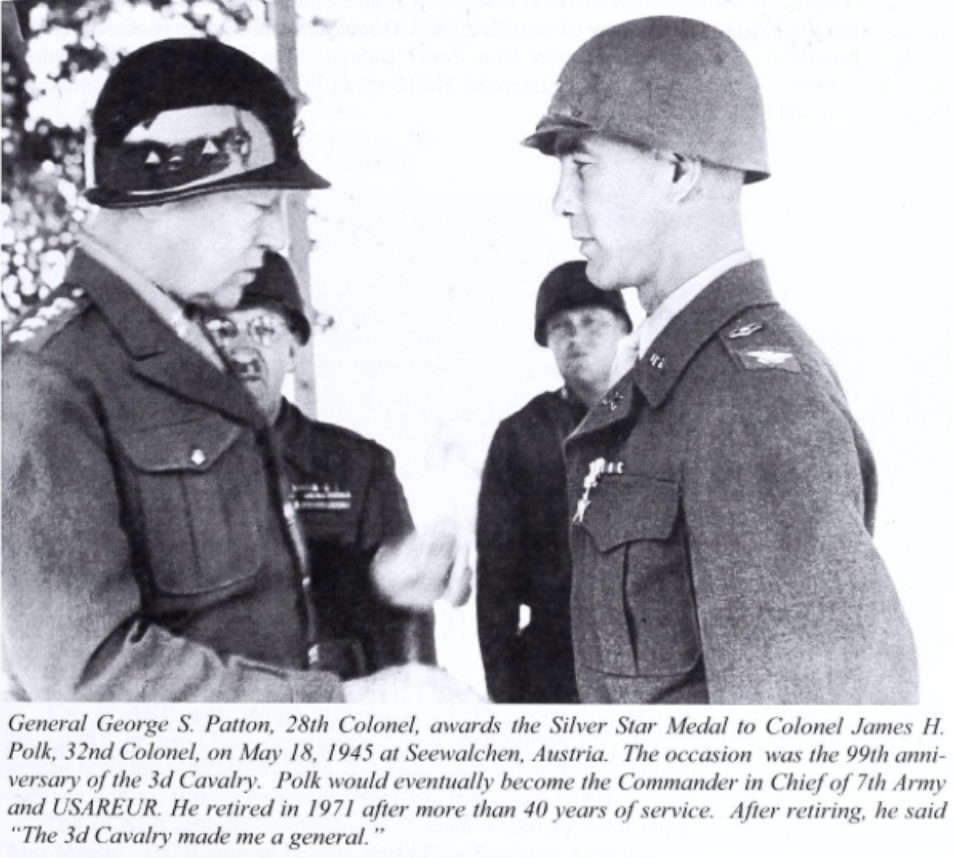
Polk being awarded the Silver Star from George S. Patton

== Post military career ==
Polk retired to El Paso, Texas, and served as Chairman of the Board of the U.S. Cavalry Association from 1978 to 1992, and president of Army Emergency Relief from 1975 to 1984.

He died on 18 February 1992, at William Beaumont Army Medical Center in El Paso, Texas after battling cancer and pneumonia. He was buried in Arlington National Cemetery. Later his wife, Josephine Leavell Polk (1913–1999), was buried with him.

His World War II letters were published in 2005 under the title World War II Letters and Notes of Colonel James H. Polk, 1944–1945 (ISBN 1932762191).

The 3d Cavalry Association named its scholarship fund for the children of fallen 3ACR soldiers after him.

In June 2025, Fort Johnson (named for Medal of Honor recipient Sgt. William Henry Johnson) was renamed back to Fort Polk after James H. Polk. The Fort had previously been named Fort Polk after Confederate general Leonidas Polk.

Military offices
Preceded by Andrew P. O'Meara	Commanding General of United States Army Europe; June 1, 1967 to March 20, 1971	Succeeded by Arthur S. Collins, Jr.
