= Jean Engler =

Jean Engler may refer to:

- Jean Engler (canoeist), Swiss slalom canoeist
- Jean E. Engler, United States Army officer
