= Edward Almond =

United States Army general (1892–1979)

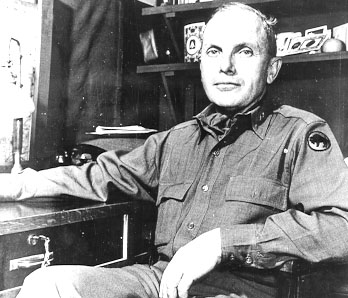
- Born: December 12, 1892; Luray, Virginia, United States
- Died: June 11, 1979 (aged 86); San Antonio, Texas, United States
- Burial place: Arlington National Cemetery, Virginia, United States
- Military career
- Allegiance: United States
- Branch: United States Army
- Service years: 1916–1953
- Rank: Lieutenant general
- Nickname: "Ned"
- Service number: 0-4666
- Commands: United States Army War College; X Corps; 2nd Infantry Division; 92nd Infantry Division; 3rd Battalion, 45th Infantry Regiment; 12th Machine Gun Battalion
- Conflicts: World War I World War II; Korean War
- Awards: Distinguished Service Cross (2); Army Distinguished Service Medal (2); Silver Star (2); Legion of Merit; Distinguished Flying Cross (3); Bronze Star Medal (2); Purple Heart

Edward Mallory Almond (December 12, 1892 – June 11, 1979) was a senior United States Army officer who fought in World War I, World War II, where he commanded the 92nd Infantry Division, and the Korean War, where he commanded the U.S. X Corps.

== Early life and education ==
Edward Mallory Almond was born on December 12, 1892, in Luray, Virginia. He was the first son of Walter, a farm equipment salesman, and Grace Popham Almond. Another boy, Malcolm, joined the family in 1895, as did a sister, Judy, in 1897. Young Almond, nicknamed "Ned" by his family, grew up being told stories by his paternal grandmother about the American Civil War. Almond's maternal grandfather, Thomas Popham, along with his great-uncle, William Barton Mallory, had both served in the Confederate Army during the war.

In Almond’s youth there were still many veterans of the Civil War all over Virginia. Almond stated in later life that neither his grandparents nor the older people who had been involved spoke much about the conflict. He did note, however, that there seemed to be an undertone of bitterness for having lost the war.

Of his early years, Michael E. Lynch states:

Almond grew up in the “Jim Crow” South, and did not question the status quo. He demonstrated no particularly racist tendencies beyond the societal norms of the day. His racism found expression in the genteel paternalism exhibited by middle-class and upper-class Virginians of the region. Black people lived in the “certain sections” of the towns of his youth, and he generally saw them only in subservient roles working on his grandfather’s farm. Despite the prevailing Jim Crow environment, this limited contact with African-Americans engendered a moderate outlook, shaping Almond’s early years and carrying over into his military career.

Always interested in the military, determined to be a professional soldier, and inspired throughout his life by the words of Stonewall Jackson's, "You may be whatever you resolve to be", Almond graduated from the Virginia Military Institute (VMI) in June 1915. He graduated third in a class of sixty-five cadets. He was later commissioned as a first lieutenant in the United States Army on 30 November 1916. The United States entered World War I soon afterwards, in April 1917.

== World War I ==
Almond served in France during the latter stages of the war, ending it as a major. He fought in the Meuse–Argonne offensive of late 1918 as the commander of the 12th Machine Gun Battalion of the 4th Division, commanded then by Major General George H. Cameron. During his service in France, he was wounded in action and received a Silver Star Citation (later upgraded to the Silver Star decoration). Of his being wounded, which occurred in early August 1918, he later wrote:

I had just opened a can of corn willy [corned beef] when a shell broke into our midst from across the stream, and although I had my helmet on it penetrated my helmet and the top of my head. My orderly who had brought me my supper was killed by another fragment, and a number of men in my vicinity were wounded also, and a couple killed.

After being relieved from combat in the Meuse–Argonne, Almond's division, the 4th, was transferred to the newly created Second Army in mid-October. Almond was preparing his battalion, which he assumed command of on October 1, for a huge new offensive scheduled for November 12, although the Armistice with Germany brought an end to this plan.

The relatively short campaign in the Meuse−Argonne had cost the 4th Division dearly, with 45 officers being killed and 199 wounded, and 1,120 enlisted men killed, with a further 6,024 wounded. Almond's battalion had suffered 190 casualties, 4 of them being officers. The next few months for Almond and his battalion were spent on occupation duty in Germany.

Almond’s experiences in the First World War taught him some enduring lessons about the value of training. War in Europe had changed the US Army a great deal, and Almond experienced much of that change. Almond also began to exhibit some of the professional traits that became the hallmarks of his career: aggressiveness, loyalty, and commitment to his mission. Almond finished the war as a temporary major, having been awarded a citation and a wound badge. When the War Department revised the awards system in the 1930s, the Silver Star replaced the citation and the Purple Heart replaced the wound badge. He had shown personal courage and aggressiveness and demonstrated tactical initiative that marked him as a bright and capable officer. The coming years saw him develop and mature professionally, and his experience and training helped prepare him for continued service. He would stay in the Army as it demobilized, and in the coming years he would meet and adapt to other challenges.

== Between the wars ==
From 1919 to 1924, Almond taught military science at Marion Military Institute. He then attended the United States Army Infantry School at Fort Benning in Georgia after which he resumed teaching at Marion until 1928. He also taught at the Infantry School at Fort Benning, becoming acquainted with Lieutenant Colonel George C. Marshall, the assistant commandant of the school.

In 1930, Almond graduated from the Command and General Staff School at Fort Leavenworth in Kansas. After a tour of duty in Philippines, where he commanded a battalion of Philippine Scouts, he attended the Army War College in 1934, after which he was attached to the Intelligence Division of the General Staff for four years. Having been promoted to lieutenant colonel on September 1, 1938, he attended the Army War College, Air Corps Tactical School, and finally the Naval War College, from which he graduated in 1940. Almond was then assigned to staff duty at VI Corps HQ, Providence, Rhode Island, receiving a promotion to the temporary rank of colonel on October 14, 1941.

== World War II ==
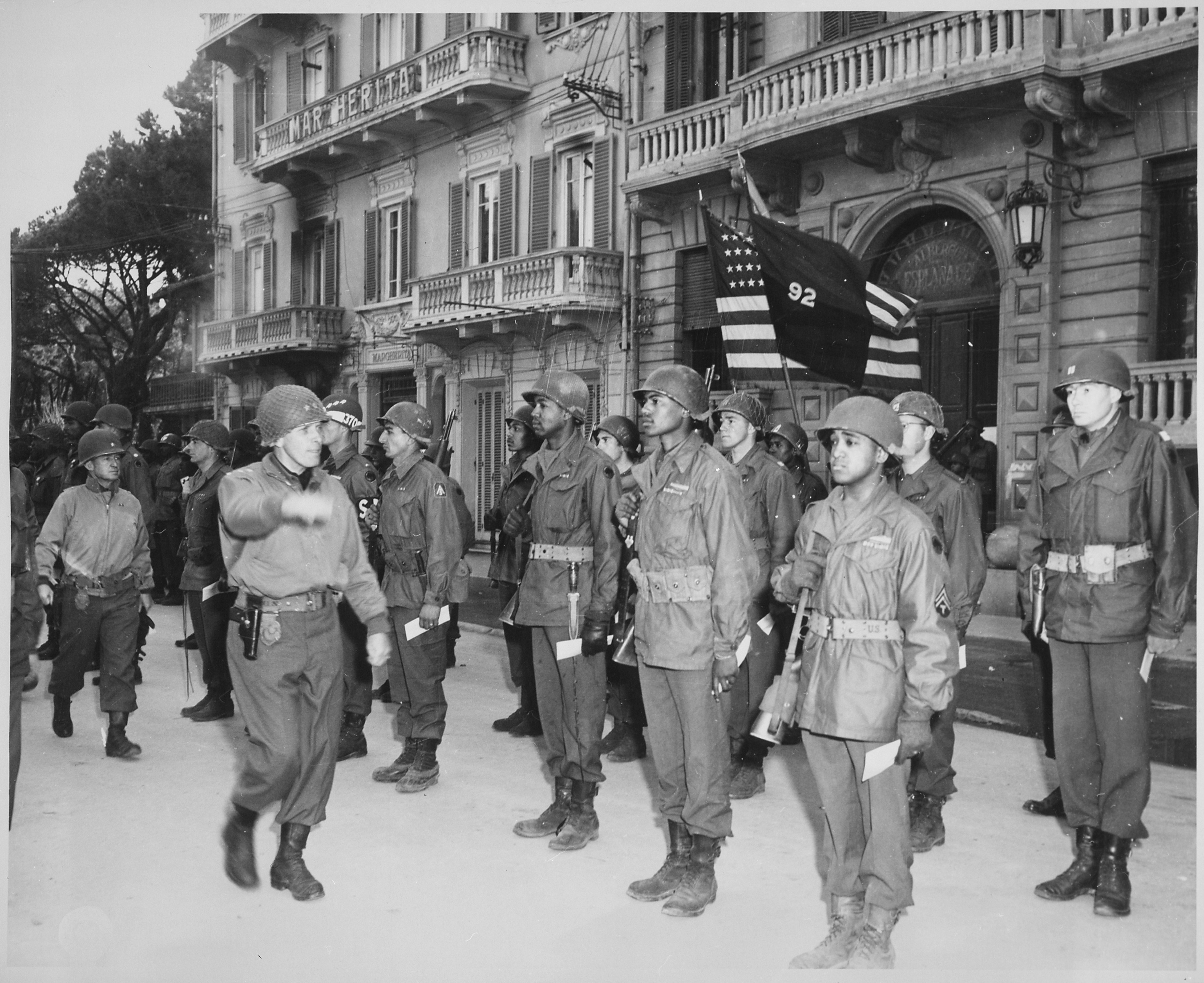
Major General Edward Almond, commander of the 92nd Infantry Division in Italy, inspects his troops during a decoration ceremony, March 1945.

Soon after the American entry into World War II, in December 1941, Almond was promoted to brigadier general on March 15, 1942 and was named assistant division commander (ADC) of the 93rd Infantry Division, a newly raised African-American formation, commanded at the time by Major General Charles P. Hall, and which was then based in Arizona.

Almond was for a time highly regarded by George C. Marshall, also a VMI graduate, who was now Army Chief of Staff. This regard accounted in part for Almond's promotion to major general, on September 23, ahead of most of his peers and subsequent command of the 92nd Infantry Division, made of almost exclusively African-American soldiers, a position he held from its formation in October 1942 until August 1945. Almond, surprised to be given such an assignment, in later years speculated why he was selected for command of the 92nd, stating:

I think that General Marshall felt that General [Charles P.] Hall, who was in command of the Ninety-third Division when I was [his] Assistant Division Commander and [Hall] was from Mississippi, understood the character of the Negro and his habits and inclinations. The artilleryman at that time was General William Spence from North Carolina as I recall, who also had that understanding of Southern customs and Negro capabilities; the attitudes of Negroes in relationships thereto. I think that my selection for the Ninety-third and Ninety- second Divisions was of the same character.

He led the division during its training in the United States and in combat in the final phases of the Italian campaign of 1944–1945. During its time in Italy the division, arriving piecemeal throughout the latter half of 1944, underwent several changes in its organization, and suffered a total of almost 3,000 casualties during the often bitter Italian fighting, all while forming part of the U.S. Fifth Army under Lieutenant General Mark W. Clark and later Lucian Truscott.

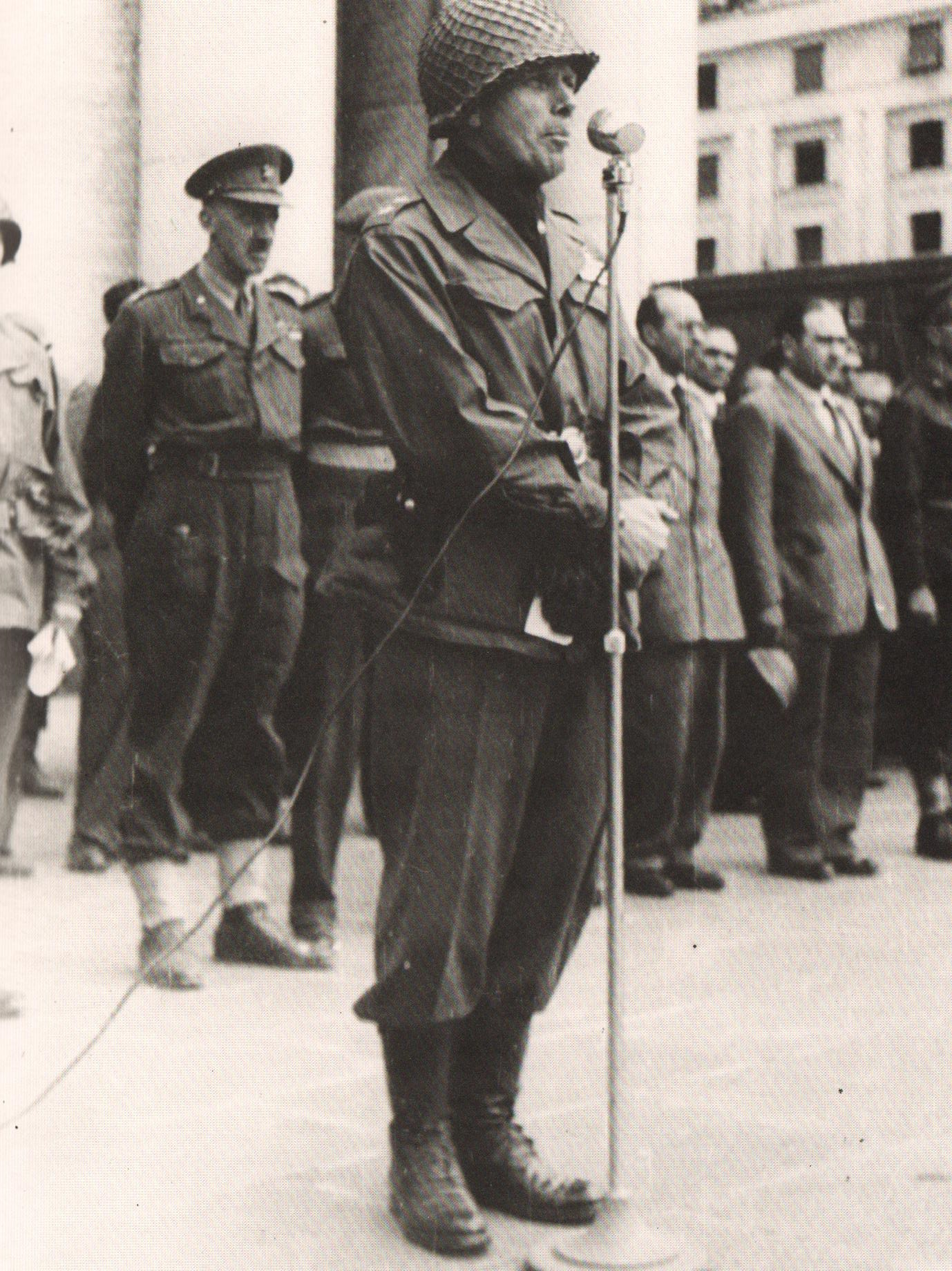
Major General Edward Almond, commander of the 92nd Division, during the Victory parade in Genoa, Italy, May 1945.

Although Marshall picked Almond for this assignment because Marshall believed Almond would excel at this difficult assignment, the division performed poorly in combat with Almond blaming the division's poor performance on its largely African-American troops, echoing the widespread prejudice in the segregated Army that blacks made poor soldiers—and went on to advise the Army against ever again using African-Americans as combat troops. Almond told confidants that the division's poor combat record had cheated him of higher command.

No white man wants to be accused of leaving the battle line. The Negro doesn't care.... people think being from the South we don't like Negroes. Not at all, but we understand his capabilities. And we don't want to sit at the table with them.

— Edward Almond

== Occupation duty in Japan ==
In 1946, Almond was transferred to Tokyo as chief of personnel at General Douglas MacArthur's headquarters, normally a dead-end job. Almond very effectively handled the sizable challenge of staffing the occupation forces in Japan as American forces rapidly demobilized, standing out among MacArthur's lackluster staff. Having won MacArthur's confidence as capable and loyal, Almond was the logical choice to become Chief of Staff in January 1949, when the incumbent, Paul J. Mueller, rotated home.

== Korean War and X Corps ==
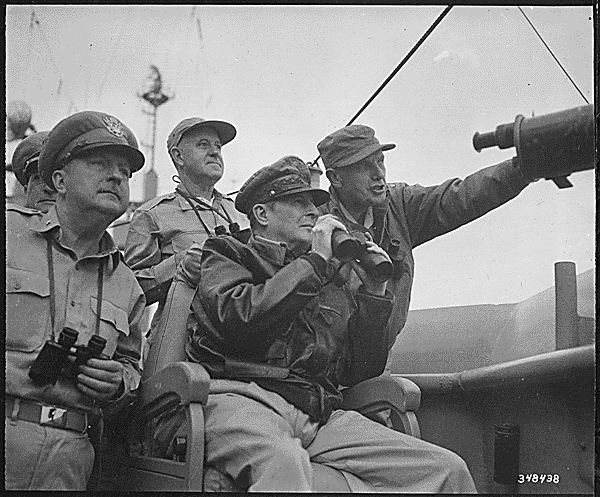
Brigadier General Courtney Whitney; General Douglas MacArthur, Commander in Chief of U.N. Forces; and Major General Edward Almond, observe the shelling of Inchon from the U.S.S. Mt. McKinley, September 15, 1950.

After the initial North Korean attack in June 1950, United Nations forces were forced to withdraw and eventually fell back to the Pusan Perimeter.

MacArthur decided to counterattack with an amphibious invasion at Inchon in November. The invasion force, consisting of the 1st Marine Division and the 7th Infantry Division, was originally named "X Force" and was placed under the command of Almond. Because the name X Force was confusing to logistics officers, upon Almond's suggestion, the formation was re-designated as X Corps. MacArthur split X Corps from the 8th Army, then placed Almond, who had no experience with amphibious operations, in command of the main landing force just before the landings.

Almond earned the scorn of Marine officers when, during the early phase of the Inchon landing, he asked if the amphibious tractors used to land the Marines could float. The invasion succeeded, but Almond did not pursue effectively and most of the routed North Korean Army escaped northwards.

During this time, Major General O. P. Smith, commander of the 1st Marine Division, which was part of X Corps (and therefore under Almond's overall command) from October until December 1950 had many conflicts with Almond.

Almond also had a poor relationship with Lieutenant General Walton Walker, commander of the 8th Army, and “his singularly unfortunate rivalry with Walker left an indelible stamp on what happened” in Korea.

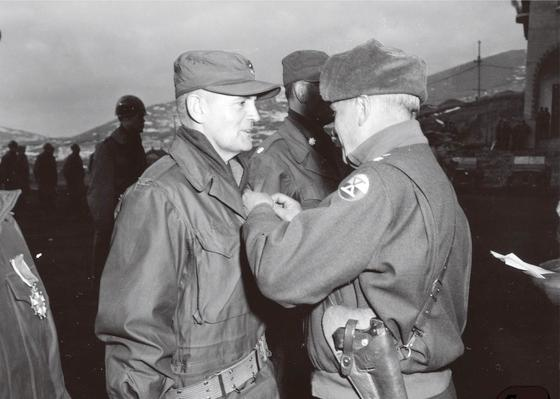
Colonel Edward H. Forney, Deputy Chief of Staff of X Corps, receiving the Legion of Merit by Major General Edward Almond, commander of X Corps, for his part in the Hungnam evacuation in December 1950.

Historians have criticized Almond for the wide dispersal of his units during the X Corps advance into north-eastern part of North Korea, in November–December 1950. This dispersal contributed to the defeat of X Corps by Chinese troops, including the destruction of Task Force Faith, and the narrow escape of the Marines at the Battle of Chosin Reservoir.

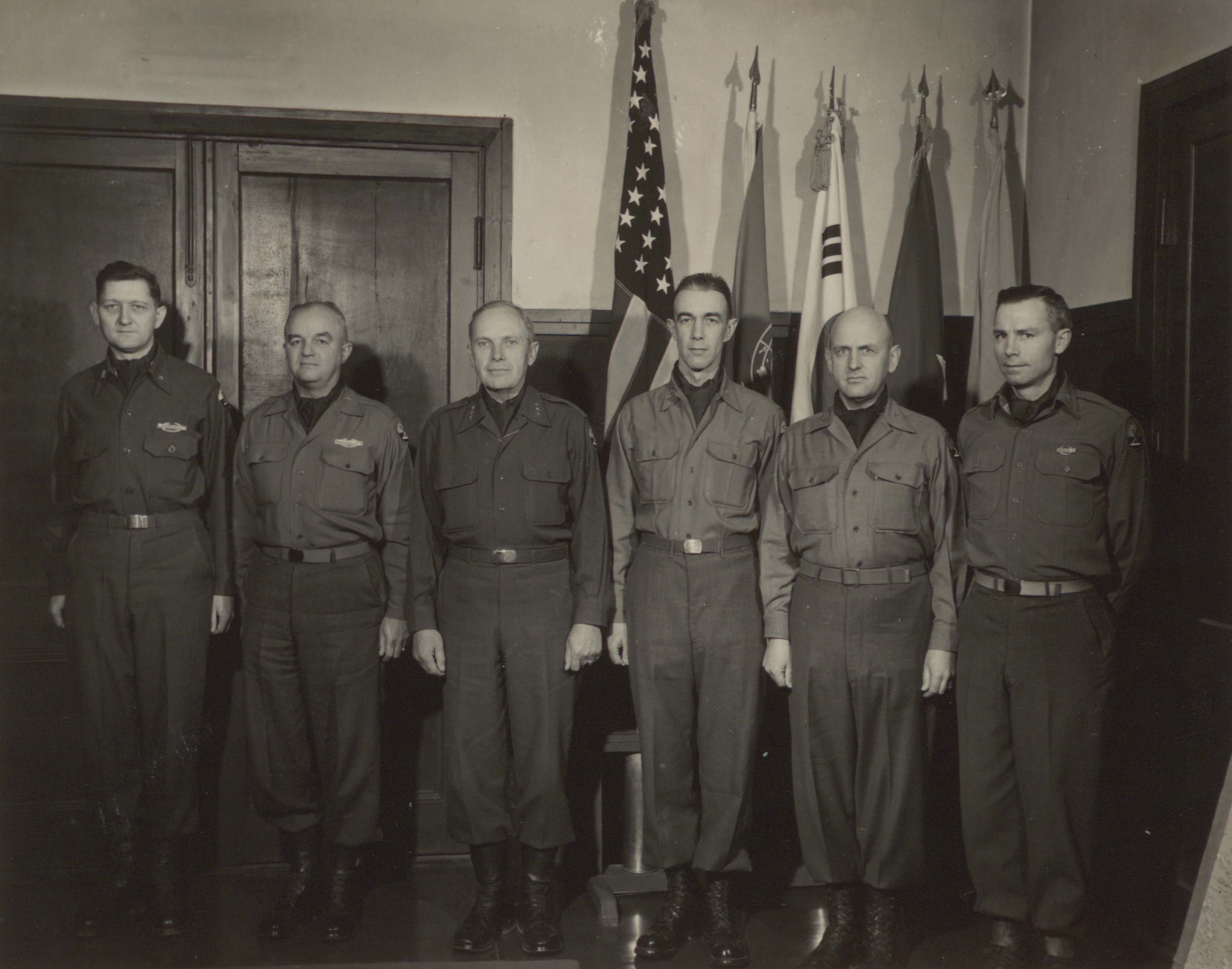
Almond (third from left) and X Corps staff officers Edward L. Rowny, John S. Guthrie, James H. Polk, Richard H. Harrison and Frank T. Mildren. 1951.

Almond was slow to recognize the scale of the Chinese attack on X Corps, urging Army and Marine units forward despite the huge Chinese forces arrayed against them. Displaying his usual reckless boldness, he underestimated the strength and skill of the Chinese forces, at one point telling his subordinate officers "The enemy who is delaying you for the moment is nothing more than remnants of Chinese divisions fleeing north. We're still attacking and we're going all the way to the Yalu. Don't let a bunch of Chinese laundrymen stop you." As stated by a close associate:

When it paid to be aggressive, Ned was aggressive. When it paid to be cautious, Ned was aggressive.

Despite these mistakes and partly due to his close relationship with MacArthur, the new Eighth Army commander Lieutenant General Matthew Ridgway, who became the commander of the 8th Army following the death of Walker in December 1950, retained Almond as commander of X Corps. Ridgway admired Almond's aggressive attitude, but felt he needed close supervision to ensure his boldness did not jeopardize his command. Almond and X Corps later took part in the defeat of the Chinese offensives during February and March 1951, and the Eighth Army's counter-offensive, Operation Killer. Almond was promoted to Lieutenant general in February 1951.

Future general and secretary of state Alexander Haig served as aide-de-camp to Almond in the Korean War.

== Post Korea ==
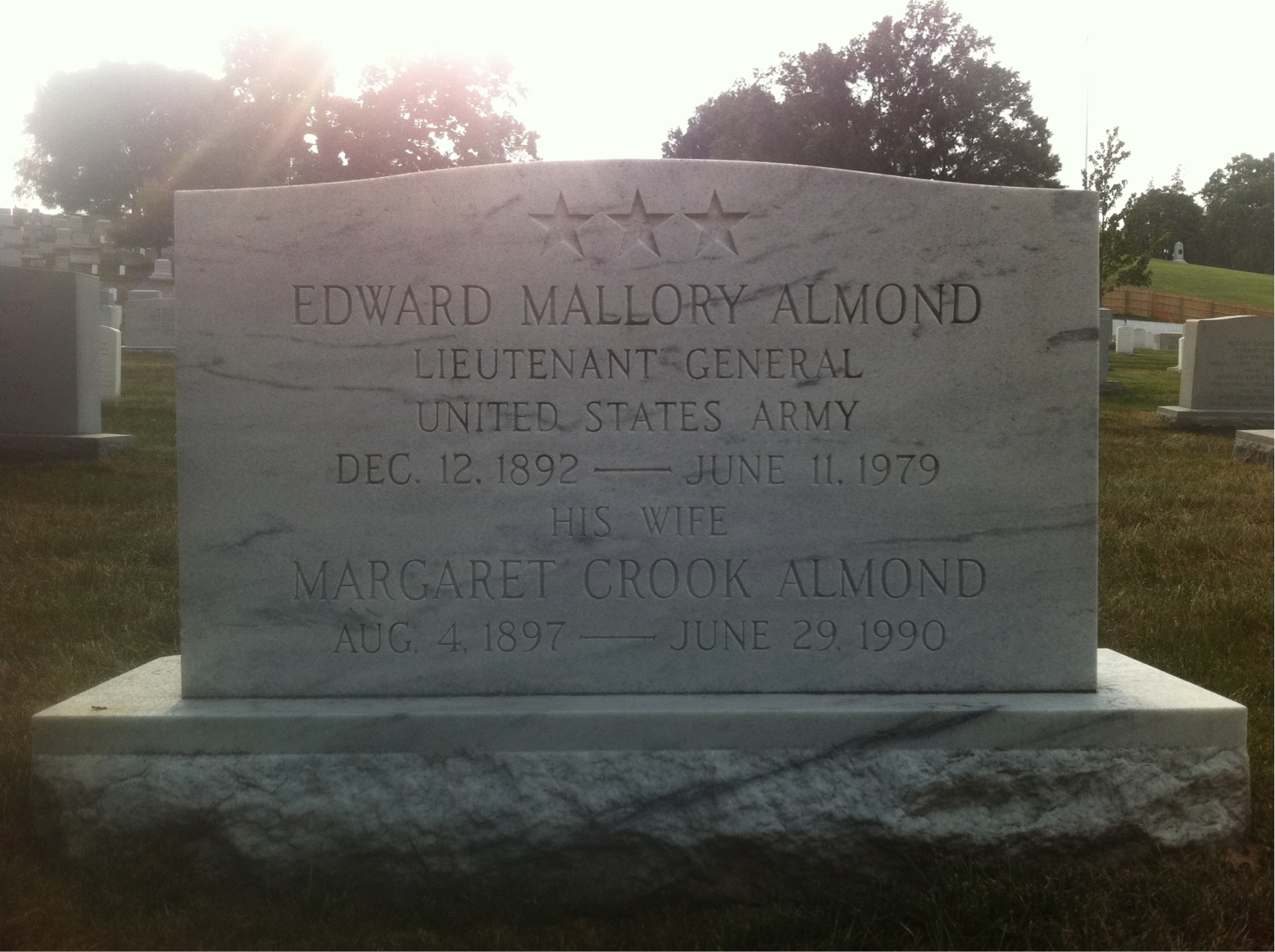
The grave of Lieutenant General Edward Almond at Arlington National Cemetery.

In July 1951, Almond was reassigned and became commandant of the United States Army War College.

He retired from the Army on 31 January 1953 and worked as an insurance executive.

In 1956, Almond was a delegate to a pro-segregationist conference where Chief Justice Earl Warren, who wrote the majority opinion for Brown v. Board of Education, was proclaimed an enemy of the United States. Speakers at the conference claimed that the country was facing a "Marxist-Zionist" takeover and equated desegregation to communism.

General Almond died in 1979, aged 86. He was buried at Arlington National Cemetery, in Arlington, Virginia, near his son, Edward Mallory Almond Jr., a captain in the 157th Infantry Regiment, killed in action on March 19, 1945, in France.

== Orders, decorations and medals ==

Distinguished Service Cross with Oak Leaf Cluster
Distinguished Service Medal with Oak Leaf Cluster	Silver Star with Oak Leaf Cluster	Legion of Merit
Distinguished Flying Cross with 2 Oak Leaf Clusters	Bronze Star with "V" device and Oak Leaf Cluster	Air Medal with 15 Oak Leaf Clusters
Army Commendation Medal with 2 Oak Leaf Clusters	Purple Heart	Mexican Border Service Medal
World War I Victory Medal	Army of Occupation of Germany Medal	American Defense Service Medal
American Campaign Medal	European-African-Middle Eastern Campaign Medal w/ 3 Campaign Stars	World War II Victory Medal
Army of Occupation Medal with "Japan" Clasp	National Defense Service Medal	Korean Service Medal with 4 Campaign Stars
Order of Abdon Calderón 1st Class (Ecuador)	Order of Solomon (Ethiopian Empire)	Honorary Companion of the Order of the Bath (United Kingdom)
Commander, Legion of Honor (France)	Croix de guerre 1939–1945 with palm (France)	Order of Military Merit (Brazil)
Cheon-Su National Security Medal (South Korea)	Presidential Unit Citation (South Korea)	United Nations Medal for Korea

=== 1st Distinguished Service Cross citation ===
General Headquarters Far East Command: General Orders No. 43 (October 23, 1950)

CITATION:

The President of the United States of America, under the provisions of the Act of Congress approved July 9, 1918, takes pleasure in presenting the Distinguished Service Cross to Major General Edward M. Almond (ASN: 0-466), United States Army, for extraordinary heroism in connection with military operations against an armed enemy of the United Nations while serving as Commanding General of X Corps. Major General Almond distinguished himself by extraordinary heroism in action against enemy aggressor forces in the Republic of Korea during the period from 15 to 25 September 1950. During the seizure of Inchon, General Almond personally visited front line units, coordinated tactical efforts, and by his own fearless example aided them in seizing assigned objectives. Following the fall of Inchon, General Almond personally led his troops in their rapid drive through enemy-held territory to seize Seoul, and to speed the disintegration of the enemy forces. During the assault of the Han River, he moved to a forward position well beyond the line of friendly forces to observe and control the river crossing. Despite heavy enemy mortar fire directed at him, General Almond remained to supervise the air and artillery support which was protecting the first units of the Seventh Infantry Division crossing the river. Disregarding enemy mine fields and sniper fire, he proceeded to the crossing site to direct fire of amphibious tanks neutralizing enemy opposition which was impeding our crossing. By his inspirational leadership, his complete indifference to danger, and personal control of the battlefield, General Almond quickly concluded tactical operations which destroyed the enemy forces in the X Corps zone of action and saved countless lives in the forces under his command.

=== 2nd Distinguished Service Cross citation ===
Headquarters, Eighth U.S. Army, Korea: General Orders No. 362 (May 28, 1951)

CITATION:

The President of the United States of America, under the provisions of the Act of Congress approved July 9, 1918, takes pleasure in presenting a Bronze Oak Leaf Cluster in lieu of a Second Award of the Distinguished Service Cross to Lieutenant General Edward M. Almond (ASN: 0-466), United States Army, for extraordinary heroism in connection with military operations against an armed enemy of the United Nations while serving as Commanding General, X Corps. Lieutenant General Almond distinguished himself by extraordinary heroism in action against enemy aggressor forces during the massive offensive by three known Communist Armies against the X Corps, during the period from 16 through 25 May 1951. General Almond personally directed the historic defense which contained this attack and resulted in crushing losses in enemy manpower and materiel. During this period General Almond distinguished himself by countless acts of individual heroism as well as providing the inspiration, leadership and tactical skill which contributed materially the success of this operation. On 19 May 1951, while reconnoitering enemy positions in a light aircraft, he observed 250 enemy at a point forward of a friendly tank patrol. General Almond landed his plane by the tank column and sent the tank platoon leader in his aide's plane to observe the enemy group. While with the tank column the enemy set up a machine gun within 500 yards of his position. Without regard for hostile fire from this gun, he directed tank fire which silenced the weapon. The tank platoon went on to destroy the 250 enemy. On 21 May 1951, General Almond made an aerial reconnaissance before a tank column operating at Soksa-ri, Korea. While flying low over this area, General Almond received intense automatic-weapons fire. Again, without regard for personal safety, he located these weapons and personally directed their destruction. Again on 25 May 1951, he made four flights in an unarmed light plane through the enemy-held mountain pass between Hangye and the Umyang bridgehead on the Seyang River. Despite intense enemy small-arms and friendly artillery fire, he returned time and again to insure proper command and liaison between friendly forces operating at both ends of the pass. These specific acts, as well as countless visits to forward-most command posts, provided the inspiration and forceful leadership essential at this critical time.

== In popular culture ==
- In the novel series The Corps, General Almond is mentioned in the last two books: Under Fire and Retreat Hell! Almond is portrayed by the author (who served under Almond in the Korean War) in a positive light.
- In James McBride's 2002 novel Miracle at St. Anna, the commanding general of the 92nd Infantry Division, General Allman, is based on Almond.
- In the 2008 Spike Lee film Miracle at St. Anna, Almond is portrayed by Robert John Burke.
- In Victor H. Krulak's 1984 novel First To Fight, Almond is critiqued by retired Lieutenant General of the Marine Corps and author of the book, Victor H. Krulak, who served alongside Almond's counterpart, Lieutenant General Shepard

== Bibliography ==
- Blair, Clay (1987). The Forgotten War: America in Korea: 1950–1953. New York: Times Books. ISBN 0-8129-1670-0.
- Fehrenbach, T.R. (1998) [1963]. This Kind of War. Dulles, Virginia: Brassey's. ISBN 1-57488-259-7.
- Halberstam, David (2007). The Coldest Winter: America and the Korean War. New York: Hyperion. ISBN 978-1-4013-0052-4.
- Lynch, Michael (2019). Edward M. Almond and the US Army: From the 92nd Infantry Division to the X Corps. Lexington: University Press of Kentucky. ISBN 978-0813177984.
- Russ, Martin (1999). Breakout: The Chosin Reservoir Campaign, Korea, 1950. Penguin Books. ISBN 0-14-029259-4.
- Taaffe, Stephen R. (2016). MacArthur's Korean War Generals. Lawrence, Kansas: University Press of Kansas. ISBN 978-0-7006-2221-4.
- Wintermute, Bobby A. (2013). "Almond, Edward M.". In Bielakowski, Alexander M. (ed.). Ethnic and Racial Minorities in the U.S. Military [2 volumes]: An Encyclopedia. ABC-CLIO. ISBN 978-1598844276.

Military offices
Preceded by William Kelly Harrison Jr.	Commanding General 2nd Infantry Division; 1945–1946	Post deactivated
New title Newly activated organization	Commanding General X Corps; 1950–1951	Succeeded by Clovis E. Byers
Preceded by Joseph M. Swing	Commandant of the United States Army War College; 1951–1953	Succeeded by James E. Moore
