= United States Army Vietnam =

U.S. Army forces during the Vietnam War

United States Army, Vietnam
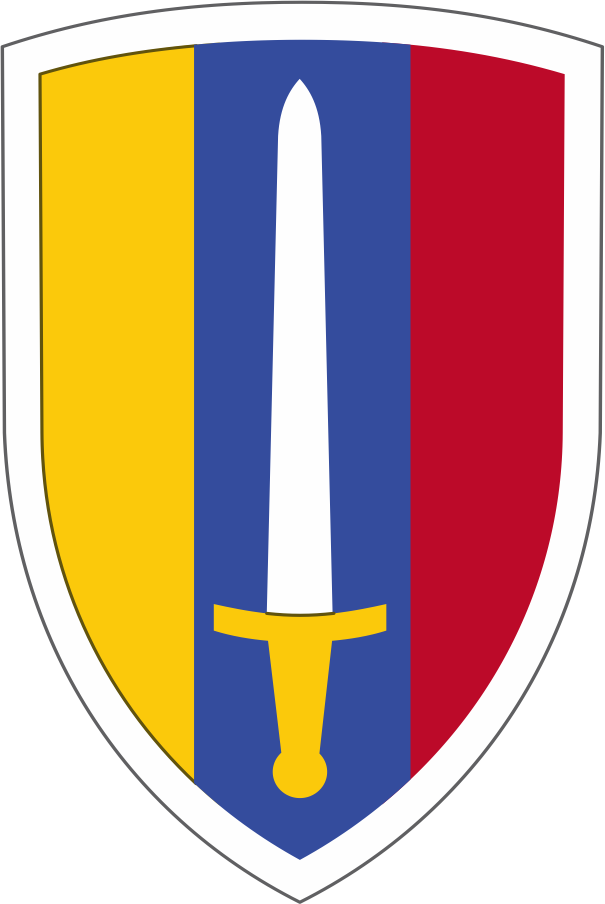
- Shoulder sleeve insignia of United States Army, Vietnam
- Active: 1965–72
- Country: United States
- Branch: United States Army
- Type: Army Command
- Role: Administrative and logistical support
- Size: Corps
- Part of: Military Assistance Command, Vietnam
- Garrison/HQ: Long Binh Post
- Engagements: Vietnam War

The United States Army, Vietnam (USARV) was a Corps-level support command of the United States Army during the Vietnam War.

== Establishment ==
Although the U.S. Army Support Group was the Army component command within Military Assistance Command, Vietnam (MACV) in 1962, its functions were limited to logistical and administrative matters and excluded operational matters, which were the concern of the chief of Military Assistance Advisory Group, Vietnam. Neither headquarters could qualify as a true Army ground component command.

In late 1964 and early 1965, when a major buildup of U.S. Army ground combat forces in South Vietnam was imminent, planners from U.S. Army, Pacific and the Department of the Army began to restudy current command arrangements. The ever-growing responsibilities of the Army Support Command, especially its duties as the U.S. Army component headquarters, precluded its reorganization into a logistical command, as envisaged in contingency plans. These developments strengthened the arguments of planners who wanted an Army headquarters to command U.S. Army ground forces.

In view of the possible deployment of major Army ground combat forces to South Vietnam, the Army Chief of Staff, General Harold K. Johnson, recommended to the Joint Chiefs of Staff in March 1965 that a separate U.S. Army component command, under the operational control of the MACV commander, be established in South Vietnam. Under his proposal, administrative and logistical functions concerning U.S. Army activities would be transferred from MACV headquarters to the new component command; the Army advisory effort would be similarly shifted, although the MACV commander would retain operational control. Under this arrangement, MACV would be relieved of administrative functions not directly related to combat or tactical operations.

The Commander in Chief, Pacific, Admiral U. S. Grant Sharp Jr. and the MACV commander, General William Westmoreland, both opposed Johnson's recommendation. On the other hand, MACV's Chief of Staff, Major General Richard G. Stilwell, held that an Army component command would prove to be a valuable coordinating link between MACV, the U.S. Army, Pacific and the U.S. Army Support Command. Through July 1965 there was a constant exchange of views between Westmoreland and General John K. Waters, Commander in Chief, U.S. Army, Pacific, concerning the establishment of a separate Army component command under MACV. Waters favored an Army component command with its own commander.

Westmoreland, however, proposed: that the U.S. Army Support Command be redesignated U.S. Army, Vietnam (USARV); that he personally retain the responsibilities of the Army component commander and be made Commanding General, USARV; that the incumbent commanding general of the U.S. Army Support Command be redesignated Deputy Commanding General, USARV; and that all Army units deployed to South Vietnam be assigned to the USARV headquarters. Westmoreland recommended the establishment of several Army corps level headquarters in South Vietnam which, under his operational control, would conduct U.S. combat operations in their respective tactical zones. Westmoreland's proposals were approved by Waters and the Department of the Army. On 20 July 1965 a letter of instruction from U.S. Army, Pacific, headquarters spelled out the new command relationship.

The appointment of Westmoreland as USARV's commanding general was a step away from the creation of a true Army component command. Although the MACV commander had been the Army component commander since August 1963, the senior Army headquarters in Vietnam had had its own commanding general. With the change of July 1965, both positions were occupied by the same individual, Westmoreland. Thus he was put in the position of having to serve two masters: the Commander in Chief, Pacific, and the Commander in Chief, U.S. Army, Pacific. Similarly, U.S. Army organizations in South Vietnam were responsible to the head of MACV for combat operations and to the commander in chief of U.S. Army, Pacific, for Army matters. The overlapping chains of command resulted in duplication and confusion within the MACV-USARV structure.

== Function ==
In May 1966 Westmoreland asked Lieutenant General Jean E. Engler, Deputy Commanding General, USARV, to study whether USARV headquarters should assume the Army's logistical advisory functions, which at the time were being performed by MACV's J-4 section, the Logistics Directorate. After completion of his survey, Engler made several observations and recommendations. The entire Army military assistance and advisory effort should, he contended, be the exclusive function of USARV, freeing MACV to concentrate on the control of its components. Engler concluded that MACV was no longer operating as a military assistance command in the true sense of the term, since U.S. tactical forces had been so greatly increased and their mission expanded.

Engler maintained that logistics should not be separated from operations and advisory activities, and therefore these functions should be performed by USARV, in an expanded role as a full-fledged Army component. As a result of Engler's appraisal, logistic advisory functions were transferred to USARV headquarters, but the broader question of USARV's status was not resolved. Lieutenant General Bruce Palmer, Jr., who succeeded Engler on 1 July 1967, elevated the logistic advisory group within the USARV staff to a general staff section, which he designated the Military Assistance Section. This action was prompted by Palmer's conviction that logistic advisory responsibilities were equal in importance to the mission of supporting U.S. troops.

In the summer of 1967 a study called Project 640 was conducted by MACV. Its purpose was to examine the problems that had arisen because the MACV organization lacked a single staff focal point to coordinate and monitor all aspects of the assistance effort. As a result of the study, Westmoreland established the post of Assistant Chief of Staff, Military Assistance, in the MACV staff to provide that focus. He also appointed a temporary committee to determine what functions could be transferred between MACV and USARV headquarters. On the committee's recommendation, logistic advisory functions were transferred from USARV, back to MACV in February 1968.

USARV controlled the activities of all U.S. Army service and logistical units in South Vietnam through ten major support commands and also supervised 71 smaller units under the organizational titles "offices", "agencies", "groups", "facilities", "centers", "depots", "teams", "activities", "elements", "companies", and "detachments".

Its ten major commands were:

- 1st Logistical Command
- 1st Aviation Brigade
- 1st Signal Brigade
- 18th Military Police Brigade
- 34th General Support Group
- 44th Medical Brigade
- 525th Military Intelligence Group
- U.S. Army Security Agency Group
- U.S. Army Engineer Command (Provisional)
- U.S. Army Headquarters Area Command (USAHAC)

USARV was commanded by COMUSMACV, but in practice the deputy commander of MACV actually supervised its operations.

In early 1967, in order to improve South Vietnamese military morale and reduce desertion rates, COMUSMACV ordered USARV to assume responsibility for improving the South Vietnamese military field ration utilization, for garrison ration commodities and for the distribution system. In addition USARV assigned responsibility for the construction of dependent housing for the South Vietnamese military.

In June 1967 COMUSMACV approved the replacement of a USARV staff section that had handled civil affairs and civic action with an assistant chief of staff for Civil Operations and Revolutionary Development Support.

By mid-1967, USARV, 1st Logistical Command, and many other Army units dispersed in Saigon were moved to Long Binh Post to resolve centralization, security, and troop billeting issues.

When General Creighton Abrams succeeded Westmoreland as COMUSMACV in June 1968 he continued Westmoreland's policy of delegating most Army logistical and administrative matters to his deputy commanding generals of USARV, successively Lieutenant Generals Frank T. Mildren and William J. McCaffrey. Abrams claimed late in 1971 that he held onto the USARV command primarily because "I wanted control over assignment of General Officers." He personally reviewed and approved all assignments and reassignments of Army generals in South Vietnam and exercised a strong influence over which generals the Department of the Army sent to his command.

In early 1969 in order to support the Vietnamization effort USARV established an advisor school at Dĩ An Base Camp to train U.S. advisors who would be assigned to Mobile Advisory Teams.

In May 1972 following the withdrawal of most U.S. military forces from South Vietnam, USARV was merged with MACV to become USARV/MACV Support Command.

In early November 1972 USARV/MACV Support Command began planning for the final 60 day withdrawal of U.S. Army personnel and the support system from South Vietnam. The command was disbanded on 28 March 1973 after completion of withdrawal of all combat and support units.

== List of deputy commanders ==
Image	Rank	Name	Begin date	End date	Notes
	Lieutenant general	Jean E. Engler	1 December 1965	1 June 1967	
	Lieutenant general	Bruce Palmer Jr.	1 June 1967	1 August 1968	
	Lieutenant general	Frank T. Mildren	1 August 1968	1970	
	Lieutenant general	William J. McCaffrey	1970	1972	

== Insignia ==
=== Shoulder Sleeve Insignia ===
- Description/Blazon

A shield 3 inches (7.6 cm) in height and 2 inches (5.1 cm) in width overall; within a 1/8 inch (0.32 cm) white border three vertical stripes yellow, blue and red, on the center blue stripe a sword pointing upward, blade white and handle yellow.

- Symbolism

Yellow and red are the colors of Vietnam. The blue center represents the United States, together with the sword it alludes to the U.S. Military in Vietnam.

- Background

The shoulder sleeve insignia was approved on 10 February 1966. (TIOH Dwg. No. A-1-408)

=== Combat Service Identification Badge ===
- Description/Blazon

A gold color metal and enamel device 2 inches (5.1 cm) in height consisting of a design similar to the shoulder sleeve insignia.

=== Distinctive unit insignia ===
The United States Army Vietnam was not authorized a Distinctive Unit Insignia ("Crest") by the U.S. Army Institute of Heraldry.
