= X Corps (United States) =

Corps of the United States Army from 1942 to 1968

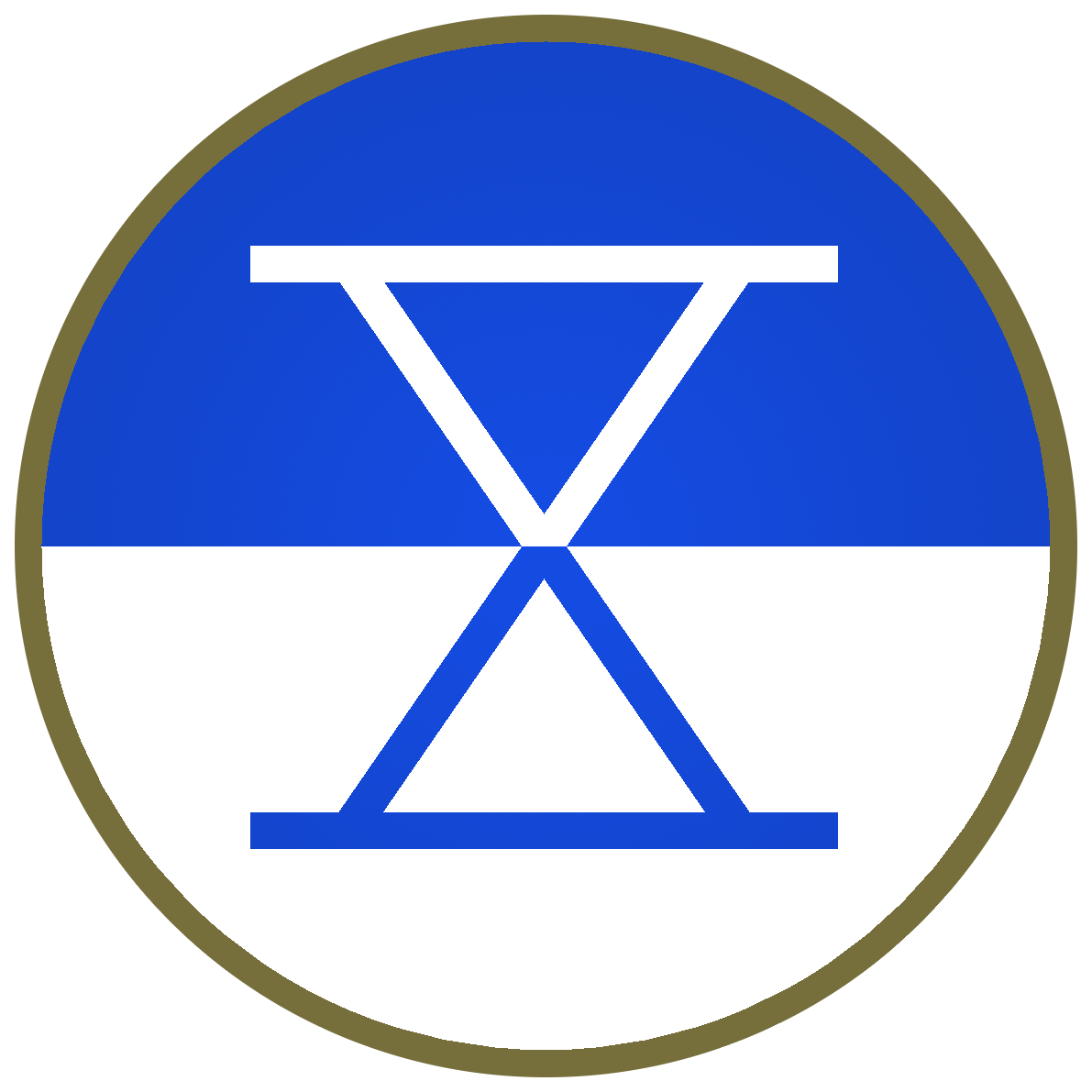
- Shoulder sleeve insignia of X Corps
- Active: 1 May 1942–31 January 1946; 12 September 1950–31 March 1968
- Country: United States of America
- Branch: United States Army
- Role: Headquarters
- Size: Corps
- Colors: Blue and white
- Engagements: World War II; New Guinea; Leyte with Arrowhead; Southern Philippines; Korean War; UN Defensive; UN Offensive; CCF Intervention; First UN Counteroffensive; CCF Spring Offensive; UN Summer-Fall Offensive; Second Korean Winter; Korea, Summer-Fall 1952; Third Korean Winter; Korea, Summer 1953
- Decorations: Philippine Presidential Unit Citation 1944–1945; Republic of Korea Presidential Unit Citation 1952; Republic of Korea Presidential Unit Citation 1954

Commanders
- Notable commanders: Edward M. "Ned" Almond; Reuben Ellis Jenkins

Insignia
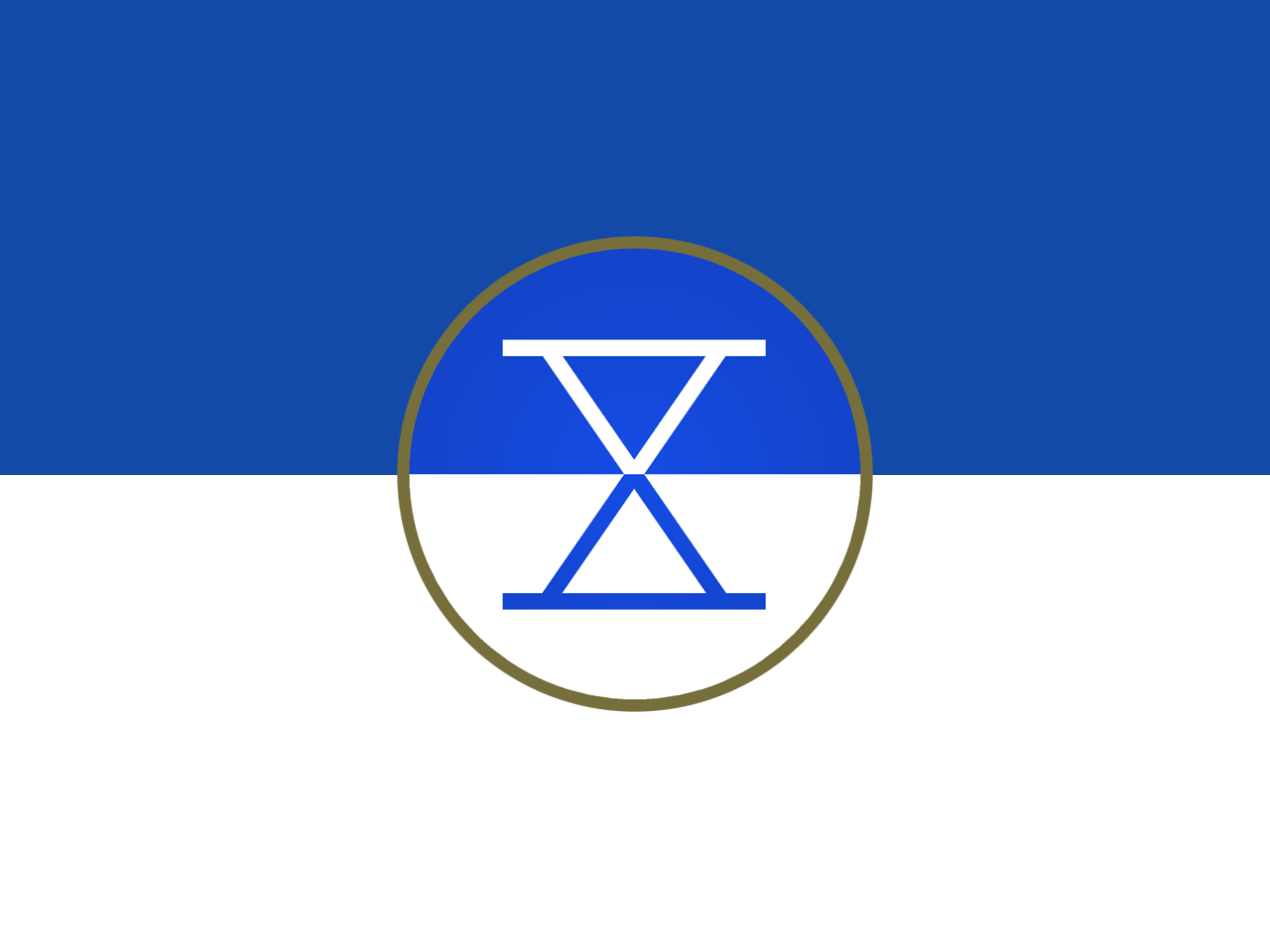
- X Corps Flag

X Corps was a corps of the United States Army in World War II and the Korean War.

== World War II ==
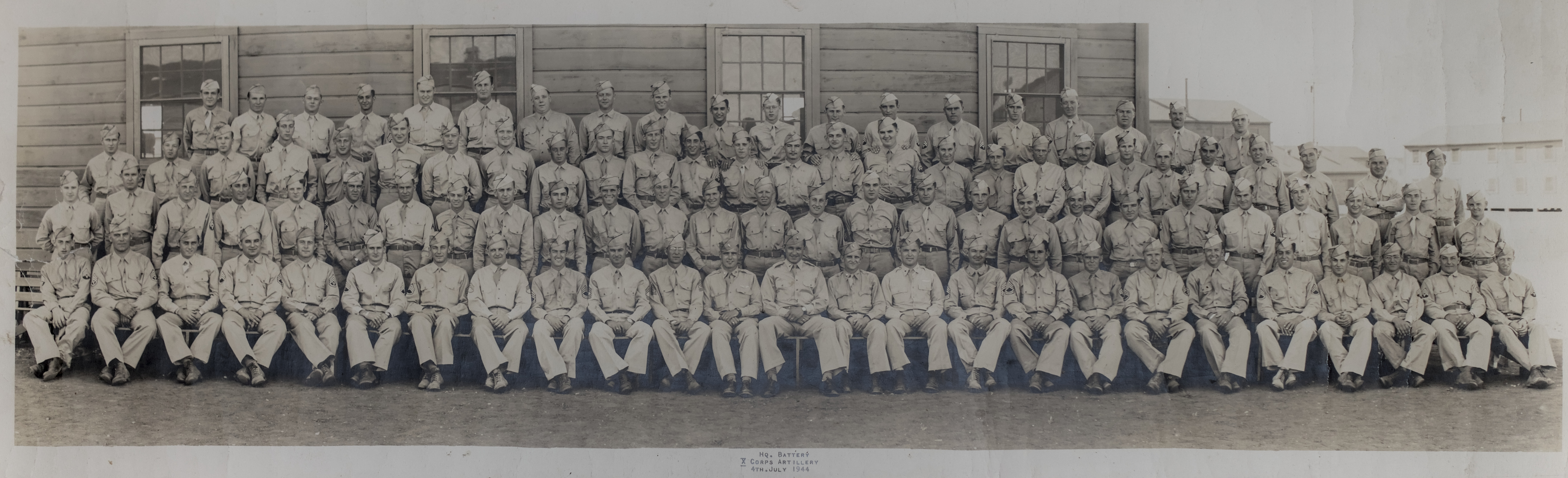
The HQ Battery X Corps Artillery, Fort Sill, 4 July 1944

The X Corps was activated on May 15, 1942 at Sherman, Texas, with Major General Courtney H. Hodges in command. The corps took part in the Louisiana Maneuvers in the summer of 1943. It then moved its headquarters, first to Camp Maxey, Texas and then to Camp Young, California. In the summer of 1944, the corps embarked for New Guinea aboard Klipfontein, a Dutch ship operating under charter through the War Shipping Administration for the Army.

As part of the Sixth Army, X Corps took part in the Philippines campaign of 1944–45, beginning with the invasion of Leyte. The core liberated Tacloban soon after landing on October 20, 1944, with Major General Franklin C. Sibert in command. Its main units for the Leyte operation were the 24th Infantry Division and the 1st Cavalry Division.

Then corps took part in the heavy fighting in rugged terrain in western Leyte, where its units destroyed the Japanese Imperial First Division, which had been rushed from Manchuria in order to stop the Allied advance. The corps was then reassigned to the Eighth Army for the Battle of Mindanao, where its units fought Japanese troops in dense jungle and mountain terrain, advancing 75 miles in three days. For its involvement, the X Corps received the Philippine Presidential Unit Citation with a streamer embroidered 17 October 1944 – 4 July 1945.

The corps was originally scheduled to take part in Operation Coronet, the planned second phase of the Allied Invasion of Japan. Following the surrender of Japan in August 1945, X Corps and its units served as occupation forces in southwestern Honshu and the island of Shikoku, with its headquarters in Kure.

The corps was inactivated on January 31, 1946.

== Korean War ==
=== Inchon landing ===
During the Korean War, the corps took part in Operation Chromite, the landings at Inchon, where it had the 1st Marine Division, the 7th Infantry Division and other US Army units under its command. The embryonic planning group for Chromite originally was known to insiders as "Force X". The entire scheme was cloaked in absolute secrecy. To outsiders, the small planning staff was known only as the Special Planning Staff of general headquarters, Far East Command.

As the organization grew, due to bureaucratic entanglements, supply orders were rejected because "Force X" was not referenced as a proper organization anywhere in Army manuals. General of the Army Douglas MacArthur (Supreme Commander Allied Powers) asked his chief of staff, Major General Edward Almond, to suggest a new name. Force X's Roman numeral ten reminded Almond of a corps which had fought under MacArthur in the last war—"why not call it the X Corps?" he asked. MacArthur was delighted and approved of the name. General Almond was subsequently chosen by MacArthur as X Corps' new commander.

The Marines first captured an island offshore of Inchon as a prelude to the assault. At the next tide, the main attack went in. Despite the noise of the attack on the offshore island, it completely surprised the North Korean Korean People's Army (KPA) forces. The Marines then moved to the capital city of Seoul. In heavy fighting they eventually drove out the KPA defenders. The US Army's 7th Infantry Division, which had landed later at Inchon, engaged the enemy on the outskirts of Seoul, destroying an armored regiment.

=== Operations in northeast Korea (October–December 1950) ===
After the landing at Inchon, X Corps attacked up the Korean peninsula on the left flank of Eighth Army. In early October it was withdrawn to prepare for another amphibious assault, this time at Wonsan on the eastern coast. This action proved to be a mistake, as Republic of Korea Army (ROK) forces moving by land captured Wonsan on 11 October before the X Corps assault went in. The Chinese People's Volunteer Army (PVA) entered the war on the side of North Korea, making their first attacks in late October.

After an administrative landing at Wonsan on 26 October, X Corps, now including the US 3rd Infantry Division, advanced inland northwest towards the Yalu River, with the ROK I Corps made up of two ROK Divisions in the far north or right flank. The US 7th Infantry Division was in the center and the US 1st Marine Division was on the southern or left flank of the X Corps attack. The 3rd Infantry Division was initially in reserve. As elements of ROK I Corps and 7th Infantry Division closed on the Manchurian border, the 1st Marine Division moved into the Chosin Reservoir (Changjin Ho).

The Marines were on both left and right sides of the Changjin reservoir. Regimental Combat Team 31 (RCT 31 also known as Task Force Maclean/Task Force Faith) of the 7th Infantry Division replaced the 5th Marine Regiment on the east side of the reservoir in a piecemeal fashion, with only two of its three maneuver battalions in place before heavy engagement with the enemy commenced. X Corps was strung out along many miles in sub-freezing temperatures, with the ROK troops and the 7th Infantry Division to the north in contact with PVA forces. RCT 31 was too far from its parent Division for support and without organic tank support and its third maneuver element, it was decimated by the onslaught of the PVA.

The 1st Marine Division fared better and with remnants of RCT 31, Army Engineers and X Corps support personnel, began its move to the sea, moving through elements of the 3rd Infantry Division (Task Force Dog from the 7th Infantry Regiment, and a reinforced battalion of the 65th Infantry Regiment), who provided flank and rear guard cover for the withdrawing units. The 7th Infantry Division in the center and ROK I Corps on the right flank also began withdrawing to the Hungnam beachhead. The Marines withdrew through the 3d Infantry Division, with intermittent contact with PVA forces up to Sudong.

The extreme temperatures during this period caused the majority of the casualties for X Corps. The Marines managed to reach the safety of Hungnam first, where the 3rd and 7th Infantry Divisions and I ROK Corps provided perimeter defense. The Marines were evacuated by the middle of December, followed by the 7th Infantry Division, I ROK Corps and the last of the X Corps' elements. The 3d Infantry Division was last to leave the beach, and evacuated on 24 December 1950.

It is widely contended that X Corps remained outside of the direct command of the Eighth Army too long. X Corps reported directly to the MacArthur had been necessary for the Inchon landings and still defensible for the Wonsan attack. After it entered the main line, conventional military doctrine indicated that it should have been placed immediately under the command of the Eighth Army. General MacArthur was accused of favoritism towards Almond, the controversial commander of X Corps, who was dual-hatted as the commander of X Corps and MacArthur's chief of staff and his personal friend.

=== Operations on the eastern front ===
After the withdrawal from the northeast coast, and once its units had been reconstituted, X Corps went into the line in eastern Korea, and remained there for the rest of the war.

== Post-Korean War ==
In the years following the Korean War, X Corps served as a regional headquarters, having administrative, logistical, and training responsibility for both active and Army Reserve units in the northwestern portion of the Continental United States.

X Corps was inactivated on 31 March 1968, as part of the compromise between U.S. Secretary of Defense Robert S. McNamara, who wanted to merge the Army Reserve into the Army National Guard, and the United States Congress, who wanted to maintain the Army Reserve as it then existed. Under the compromise plan, all of the combat divisions and most separate combat brigades of the Army Reserve were inactivated, with a corresponding increase in the National Guard.

At the same time, non-divisional combat support and combat service support units were reallocated in the Army Reserve. The fourteen area corps were inactivated. In their place, eighteen army reserve commands ("ARCOMs") were established. Each ARCOM was assigned to one of five continental U.S. armies ("CONUSAs") under Continental Army Command ("CONARC"). The bulk of X Corps' Army Reserve units were assigned to the 124th Army Reserve Command at Fort Lawton, WA.

== Commanders ==
- Major General Courtney Hodges; May 1942 to February 1943
- Major General Jonathan W. Anderson; March 1943 to July 1944
- Major General Franklin C. Sibert; August 1944 to 18 November 1945
- Major General Percy W. Clarkson; 18 November 1945 to 31 January 1946 (X Corps inactivated.)
- Lieutenant General Edward Almond; 26 August 1950 to 15 July 1951 (X Corps reactivated.)
- Lieutenant General Clovis E. Byers; 15 July 1951 to 5 December 1951
- Lieutenant General Williston B. Palmer; 5 December 1951 to 15 August 1952
- Lieutenant General Isaac D. White; 7 November 1952 to 13 October 1953
- Lieutenant General Bruce C. Clarke; 13 October 1953 to December 1954 (X Corps inactivated.)
- Major General Francis M. Day; 1958 to 1959
- Major General Edwin H. J. Carns; 1959 to 1961
- Major General Frederick R. Zierath; April 1961 to April 1962
- Major General Francis M. McGoldrick; 1962 to 1963
- Major General Charles F. Leonard; 1965 to 1967

=== Chiefs of staff ===
- Brigadier General George A. Davis; May 1942 to March 1943
- Brigadier General Harry M. Roper; March 1943 to August 1944
- Major General Clark L. Ruffner; August 1950 to January 1951
- Brigadier General John S. Guthrie; January 1951 to December 1951
- Brigadier General James K. Wilson Jr.; December 1951 to March 1952
- Brigadier General Paul D. Adams; March 1952 to July 1952
- Brigadier General Robert W. Porter Jr.; September 1952 to August 1953
- Brigadier General Harvey H. Fischer; August 1953 to February 1954

=== Artillery commanders ===
- Colonel Julius E. Slack; 24 May 1942 to 29 January 1943
- Colonel Edward T. Williams; February 1943 to April 1943
- Colonel Robert G. Gard; April 1943 to March 1944
- Brigadier General Harry M. Roper; 21 August 1944 to 31 January 1946 (X Corps inactivated.)
- Brigadier General William P. Ennis; August 1950 to 1951 (X Corps reactivated)
- Brigadier General Kenneth S. Sweany; 1951 to 1952
- Brigadier General Thomas M. Watlington; December 1952 to July 1953
- Brigadier General Theodore W. Parker; 1953 to 1954

== Notable former members ==
- Frank T. Mildren, ACoS G-3 (1951)
- John H. Chiles, ACoS G-3 (1950)
- William E. Butterworth III, served with headquarters as an information officer based in Kwandae-ri
- William J. McCaffrey, Deputy Chief of Staff (1950–1951)
- William W. Quinn, ACoS G-2 (1950)

== In popular culture ==
The US Army Tenth Corps is the name of the main field force featured in Harold Coyle's 1993 techno-thriller The Ten Thousand. In the novel, its ground combat elements are the 55th Mechanized Infantry Division, the 4th Armored Division and the 14th Armored Cavalry Regiment. (Note: When Harold Coyle wrote The Ten Thousand, the 14th ACR was an inactive unit of the United States Army. Seven years after the novel came out, the unit identity was reactivated.)
