= William J. McCaffrey =

United States Army general

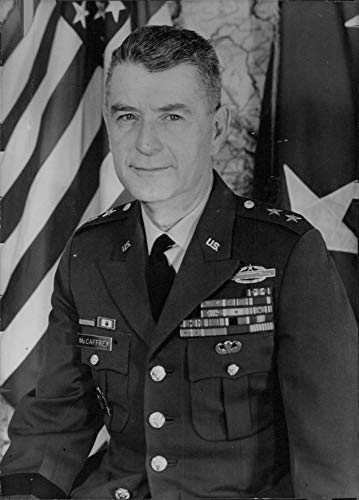
- McCaffrey as a major general, circa 1969
- Born: October 9, 1914; Omaha, Nebraska
- Died: February 13, 2006 (aged 91); Arlington County, Virginia
- Burial place: Arlington National Cemetery
- Relatives: General Barry McCaffrey (son)
- Military career
- Allegiance: United States of America
- Branch: United States Army
- Service years: 1934–1935, 1939–1973
- Rank: Lieutenant General
- Service number: 0-22065
- Commands: Deputy Commander United States Army Vietnam; United States Army War College; 31st Infantry Regiment
- Conflicts: World War II; Korean War; Vietnam War
- Awards: Silver Star Medal (3); Legion of Merit (4); Bronze Star Medal (2); Air Medal

William Joseph McCaffrey (October 9, 1914 – February 13, 2006) was a United States Army Lieutenant General and the father of retired General Barry McCaffrey.

== Early life and education ==
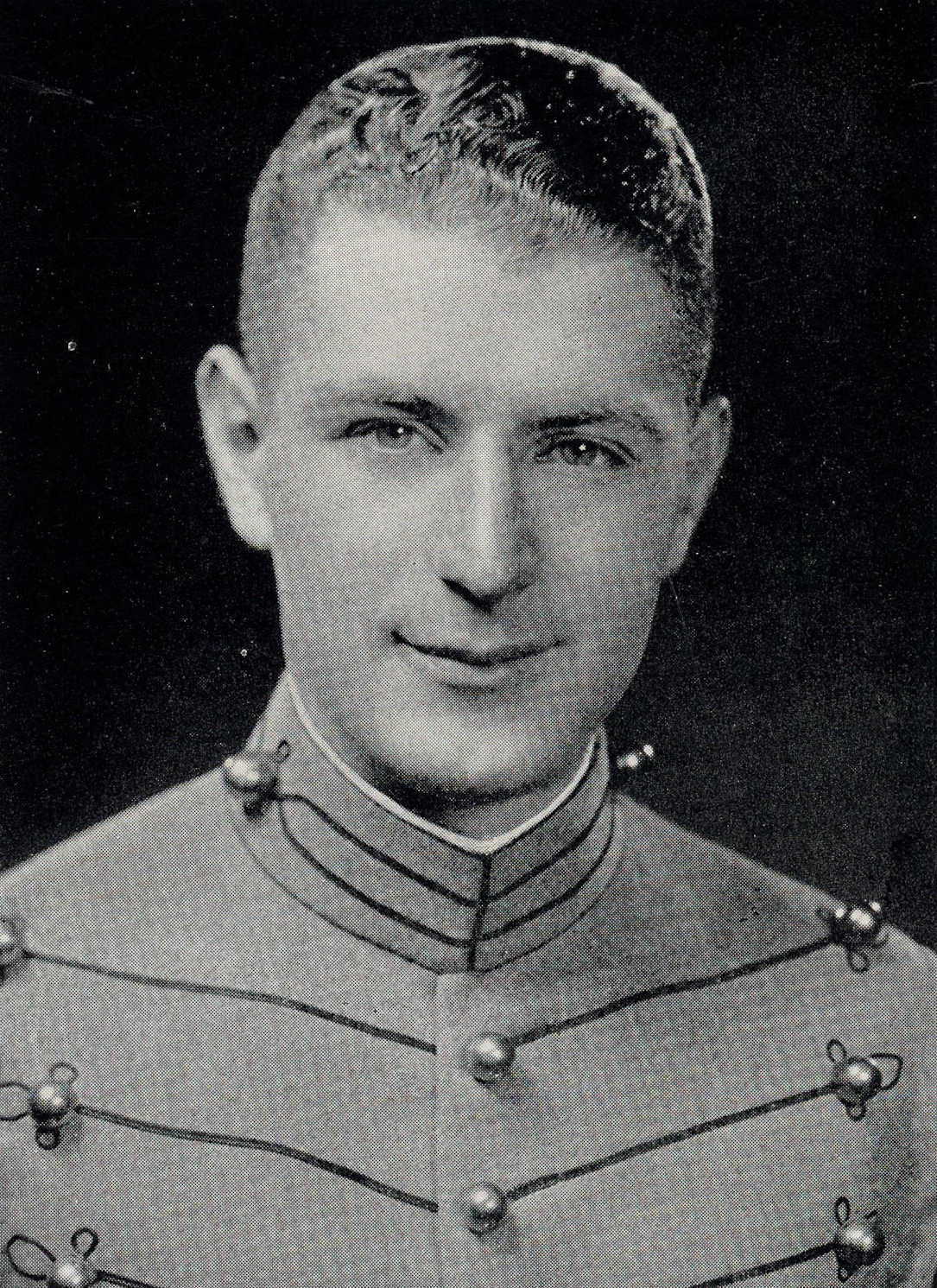
McCaffrey as a West Point cadet in 1939

McCaffrey enlisted in the Army on 24 April 1934. He started at West Point in 1935, graduating as a Second Lieutenant in 1939.

== Military service ==
=== World War II ===
McCaffrey graduated from the Command and General Staff School in 1943. He then served as chief of staff of the 92nd Infantry Division in Europe.

=== Korean War ===
McCaffrey served as deputy chief of staff X Corps.

He assumed command of the 31st Infantry Regiment when its commander was killed in the Battle of Chosin Reservoir and led them in the retreat to Hungnam.

McCaffrey graduated from the United States Army War College in 1953. He later served as Commandant of the Army War College from 15 September 1967 to 6 July 1969.

He served as assistant commandant of cadets at the U.S. Military Academy from 1953 to 1956 and then as commandant of cadets at The Citadel from 1959 to 1961.

=== Vietnam War ===
He served as Deputy Commander United States Army Vietnam from 1970 to 1972.

== Later life ==
He retired from the Army in 1973.

McCaffrey died of heart disease on 13 February 2006. He was buried at Arlington National Cemetery on 21 February 2006.
