= Frank T. Mildren =

United States Army general

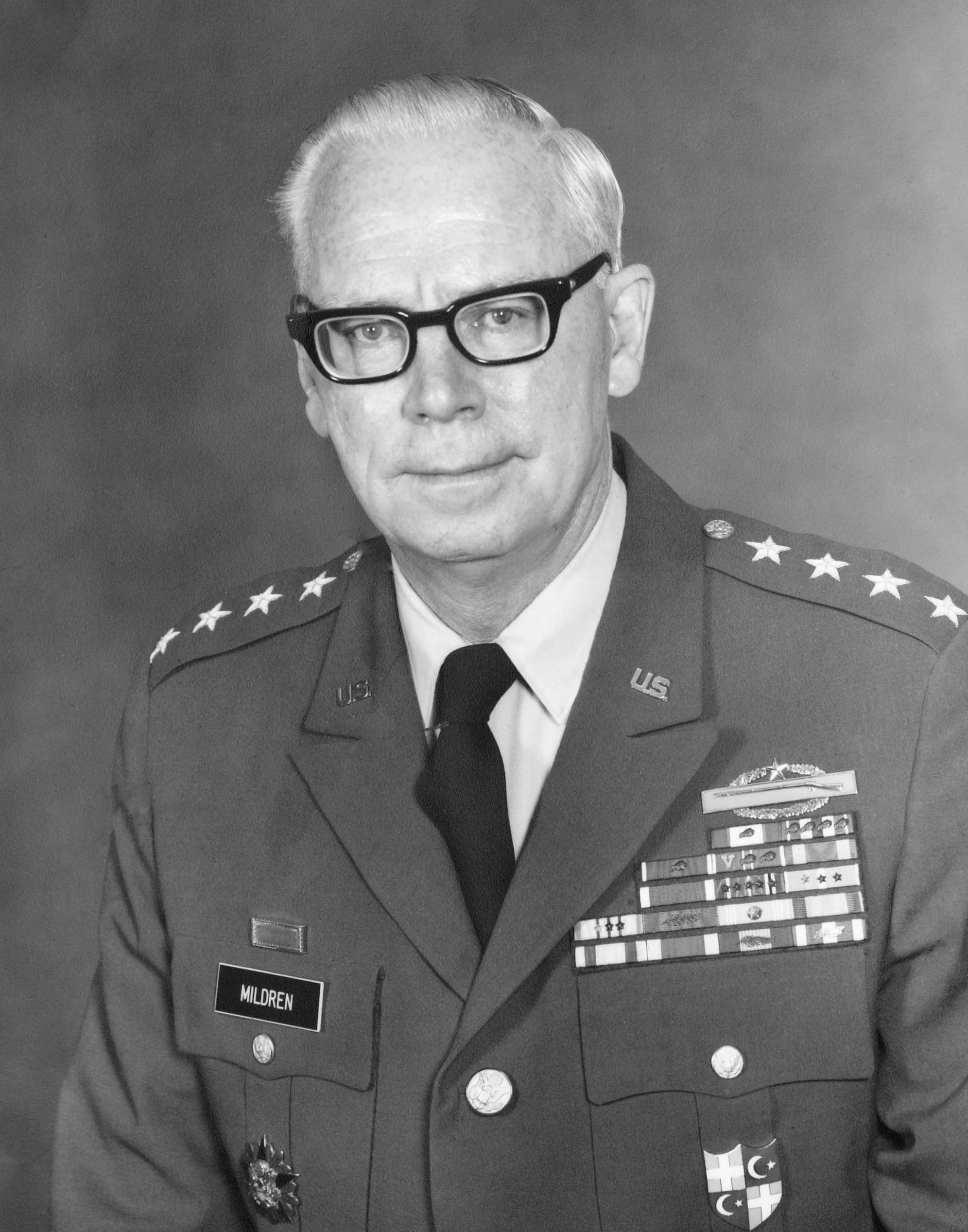
- Born: 8 July 1913; Pima, Arizona, U.S.
- Died: 14 September 1990 (aged 77) Baltimore, Maryland, U.S.
- Buried: Fort Sam Houston National Cemetery
- Allegiance: United States
- Branch: United States Army
- Service years: 1939–1973
- Rank: General
- Commands: Commander, Allied Land Forces South East Europe

Frank Thomas Mildren (8 July 1913 – 14 September 1990) was a United States Army four-star general who served as Commander, Allied Land Forces South East Europe (COMLANDSOUTHEAST) from 1971 to 1973.

Mildren was born on 8 July 1913 in Pima, Arizona. He graduated from the United States Military Academy in 1939 and began his career in the United States Army.

During the Vietnam War, he served as deputy commanding general of United States Army Vietnam.

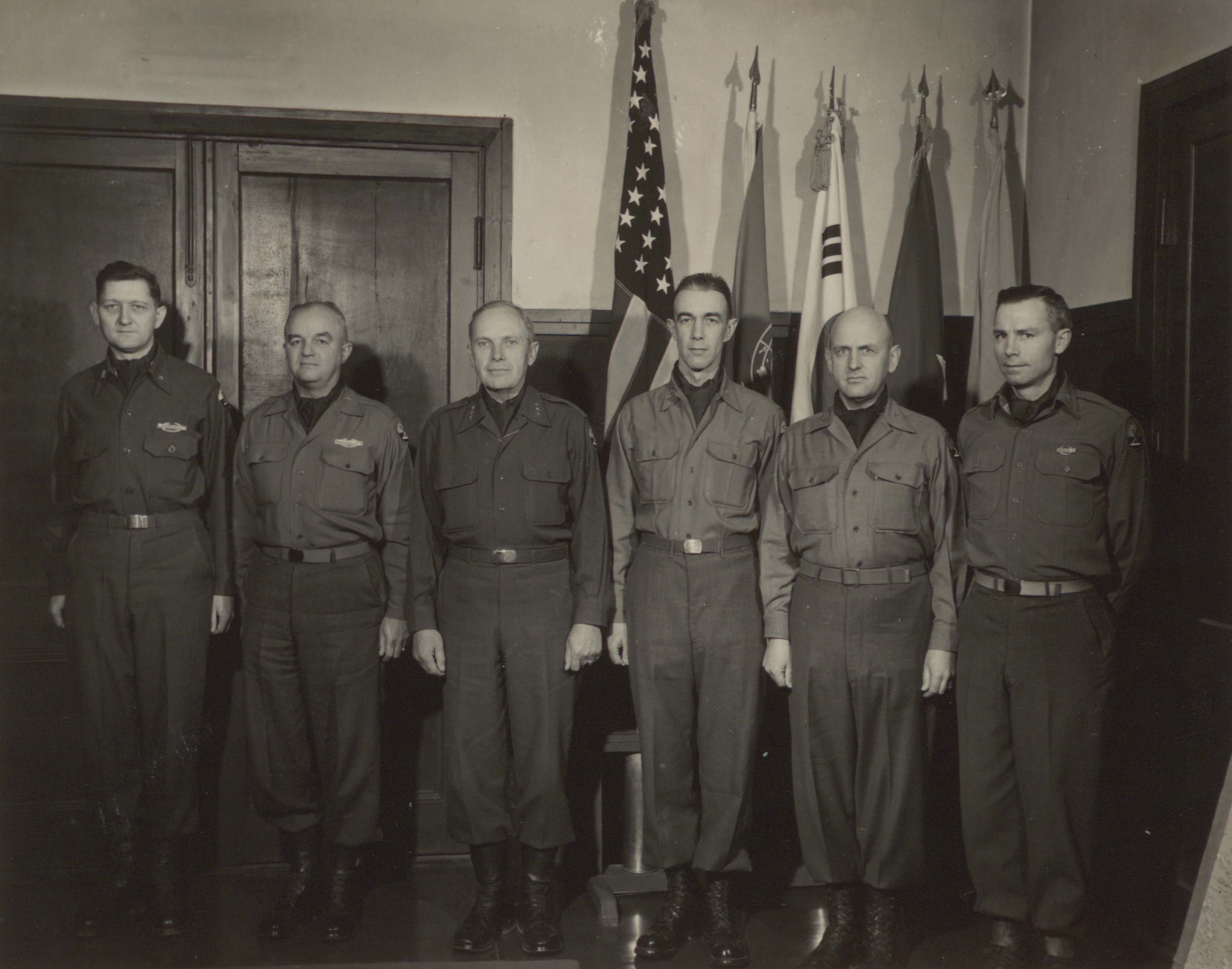
Edward Almond (third from left) and X Corps staff officers Edward L. Rowny, John S. Guthrie, James H. Polk, Richard H. Harrison and Frank T. Mildren.

Mildren was promoted to the four-star rank on 1 April 1971. He retired from the army in 1973. He died on 14 September 1990 and was buried at Fort Sam Houston National Cemetery.
