= Jean E. Engler =

United States Army officer (1909–1993)

Jean Evans Engler
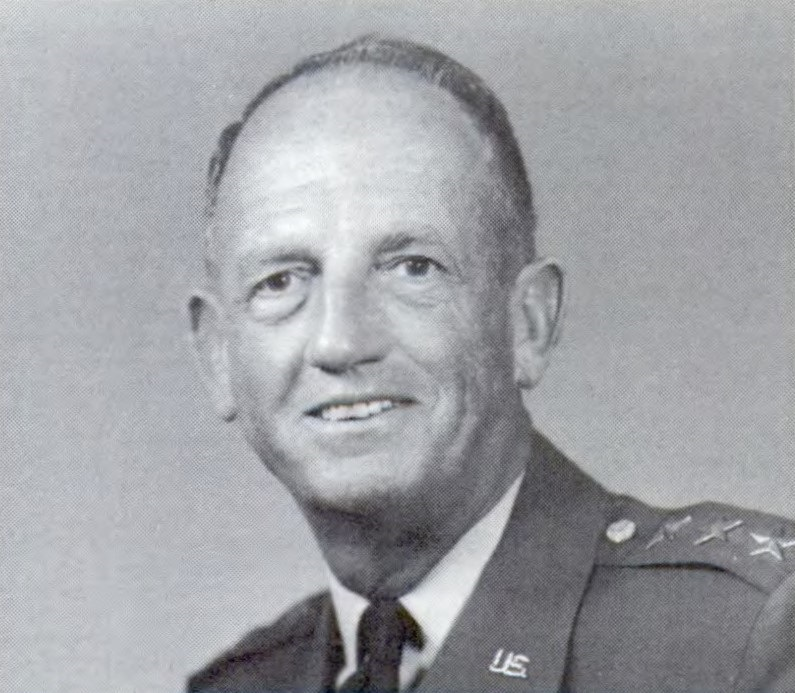
- Lt. Gen. Jean E. Engler
- Born: 3 August 1909; Baltimore, Maryland
- Died: 10 November 1993 (aged 84)
- Burial place: Arlington National Cemetery
- Military career
- Allegiance: United States of America
- Branch: United States Army
- Service years: 1933–1969
- Rank: Lieutenant general
- Commands: United States Army, Japan
- Conflicts: Vietnam War
- Awards: Distinguished Service Medal (4); Legion of Merit (2).

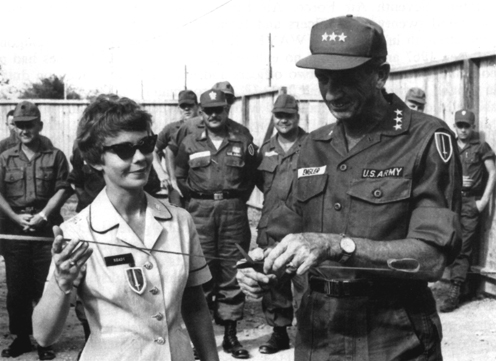
Engler cuts the ribbon opening a Women's Army Corps barracks area in January 1967

Lieutenant General Jean Evans Engler (3 August 1909 – 10 November 1993) was a United States Army officer who served in World War II, the Korean War and the Vietnam War.

== Early life ==
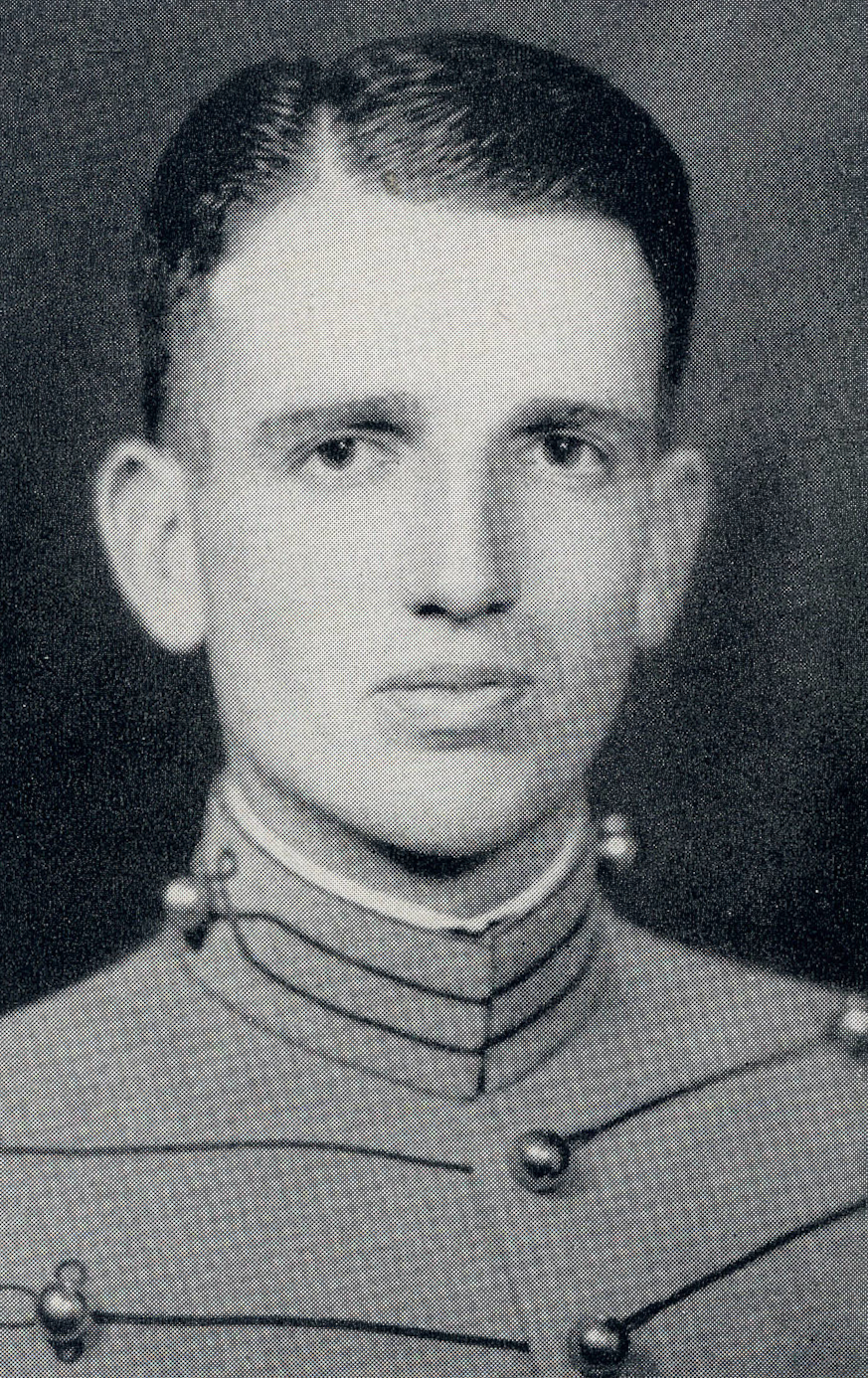
At West Point in 1933

He was born in Baltimore, Maryland on 3 August 1909.

== Military career ==
He graduated from the United States Military Academy in 1933 and was commissioned into the infantry later transferring to the Quartermaster Corps. He then transferred to the Ordnance Corps serving in the Army Tank and Automotive Command.

After serving as Deputy Chief of Staff for Logistics, United States Continental Army Command he was appointed as commanding general United States Army, Japan on 25 May 1961. In early September 1963 he was appointed deputy commanding general U.S. Army Materiel Command then as commanding general Army Supply and Maintenance Command.

In December 1965 he was appointed as deputy commanding general United States Army Vietnam (USARV). He arrived in South Vietnam in January 1966. During this time he conducted a review of the relationship between USARV and Military Assistance Command, Vietnam. In April 1966 he requested the deployment of a Women's Army Corps (WAC) detachment to support USARV and he finally received approval from the Joint Chiefs of Staff on 25 July 1966 with the first WACs arriving in late October 1966.

On 15 June 1967 he was appointed as Deputy Chief of Staff for Logistics.

He retired from the Army in 1969.

== Later life ==
He died on 10 November 1993 and was buried at Arlington National Cemetery.

== Decorations ==
His decorations include Distinguished Service Medal (4) and the Legion of Merit (2).
