= Edward Rowny =

U.S. army officer (1917–2017)

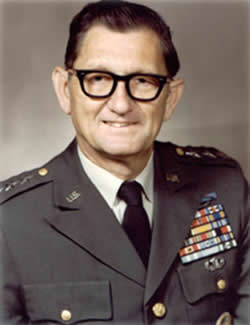
- Lieutenant General Edward L. Rowny
- Born: April 3, 1917; Baltimore, Maryland
- Died: December 17, 2017 (aged 100); Washington, D.C.
- Burial place: Arlington National Cemetery
- Military career
- Allegiance: United States
- Branch: United States Army
- Service years: 1941–1979
- Rank: Lieutenant General
- Commands: I Corps; 24th Mechanized Infantry Division; 38th Infantry Regiment; 317th Engineer Combat Battalion
- Conflicts: World War II; Korean War; Vietnam War
- Awards: Army Distinguished Service Medal (2); Silver Star (3); Legion of Merit (3); Bronze Star Medal (2); Air Medal; Commander of the Order of Polonia Restituta (Poland)

Edward Leon Rowny (April 3, 1917 – December 17, 2017) was a United States Army lieutenant general of Polish extraction. He was a commanding officer in World War II and Korea, a military advisor to five United States presidents and a negotiator on the Strategic Arms Reduction Treaty.

== Early life and family ==
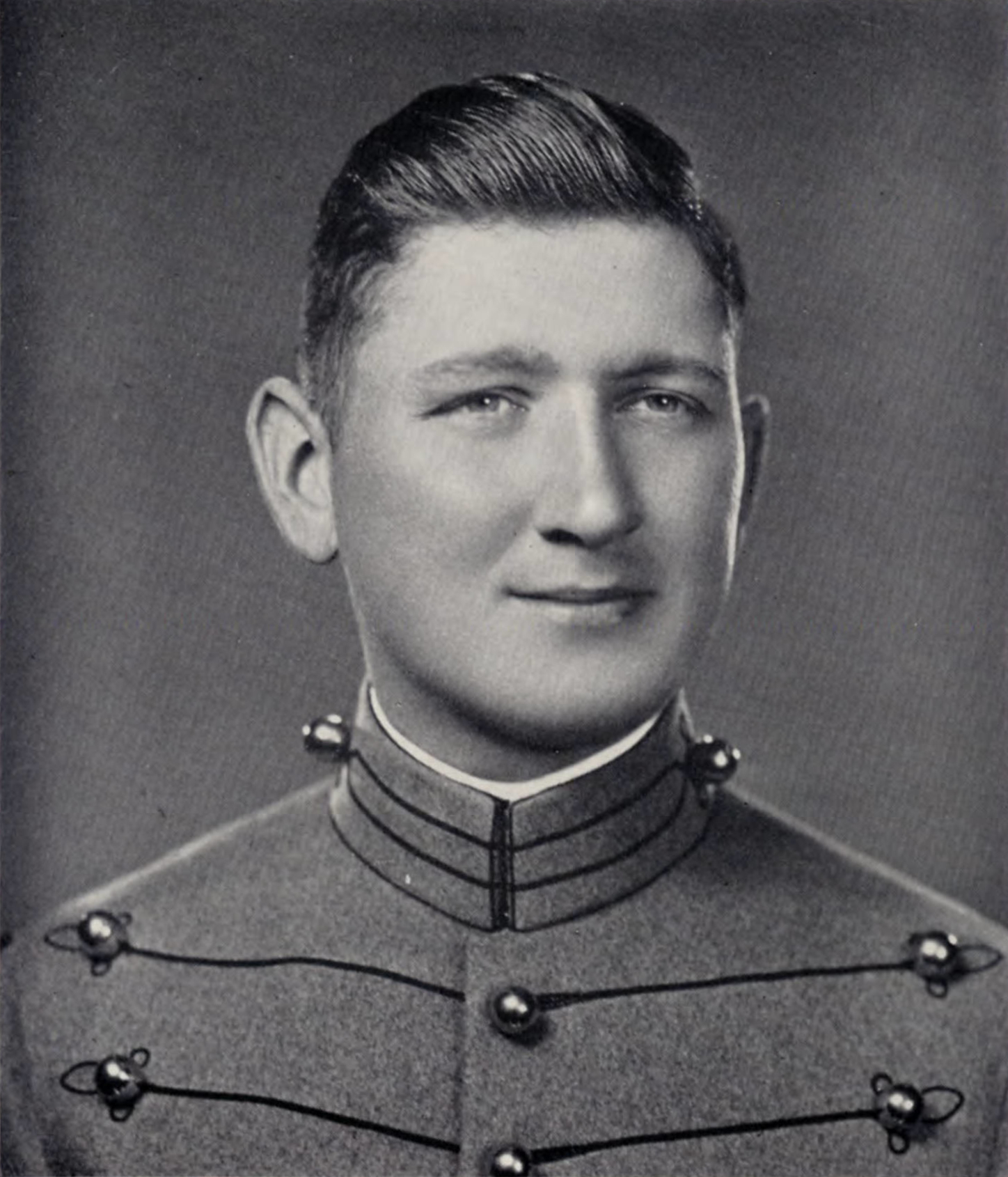
At West Point in 1941

Edward L. Rowny was born in Baltimore, Maryland, on April 3, 1917. His father, Gracyan Jan "John" Rowny, who worked as a carpenter and as a contractor, emigrated in 1912 at age 19 from the village of Nagoszewo in the Mazovia region of eastern Poland. His mother, Mary Ann Radziszewski, was born in the United States, her parents having come from Poland in 1887. They married in 1916. From age 6 to 16, Rowny was raised by his maternal grandmother, Adamina Radziszewski, who was well-educated and spoke five languages fluently. She steeped Edward in knowledge of Polish history and culture particularly about Thaddeus Kosciuszko and Casimir Pulaski, Polish officers who fought in the American Revolution. She introduced him to the music and career of Ignacy Jan Paderewski, the famous Polish composer, pianist and statesman.

Rowny graduated from the Baltimore Polytechnic Institute, an engineering high school, in 1933. During college, as a Polish American, he chose to pursue a trip through the Kosciusko Scholarship to explore Polish culture and history in Kraków. Rowny earned a Bachelor of Science from Johns Hopkins University in Engineering, and held degrees from West Point, Yale (MAs in Engineering and International Affairs) and American University (Doctor of Philosophy in International Studies).

== Military career ==
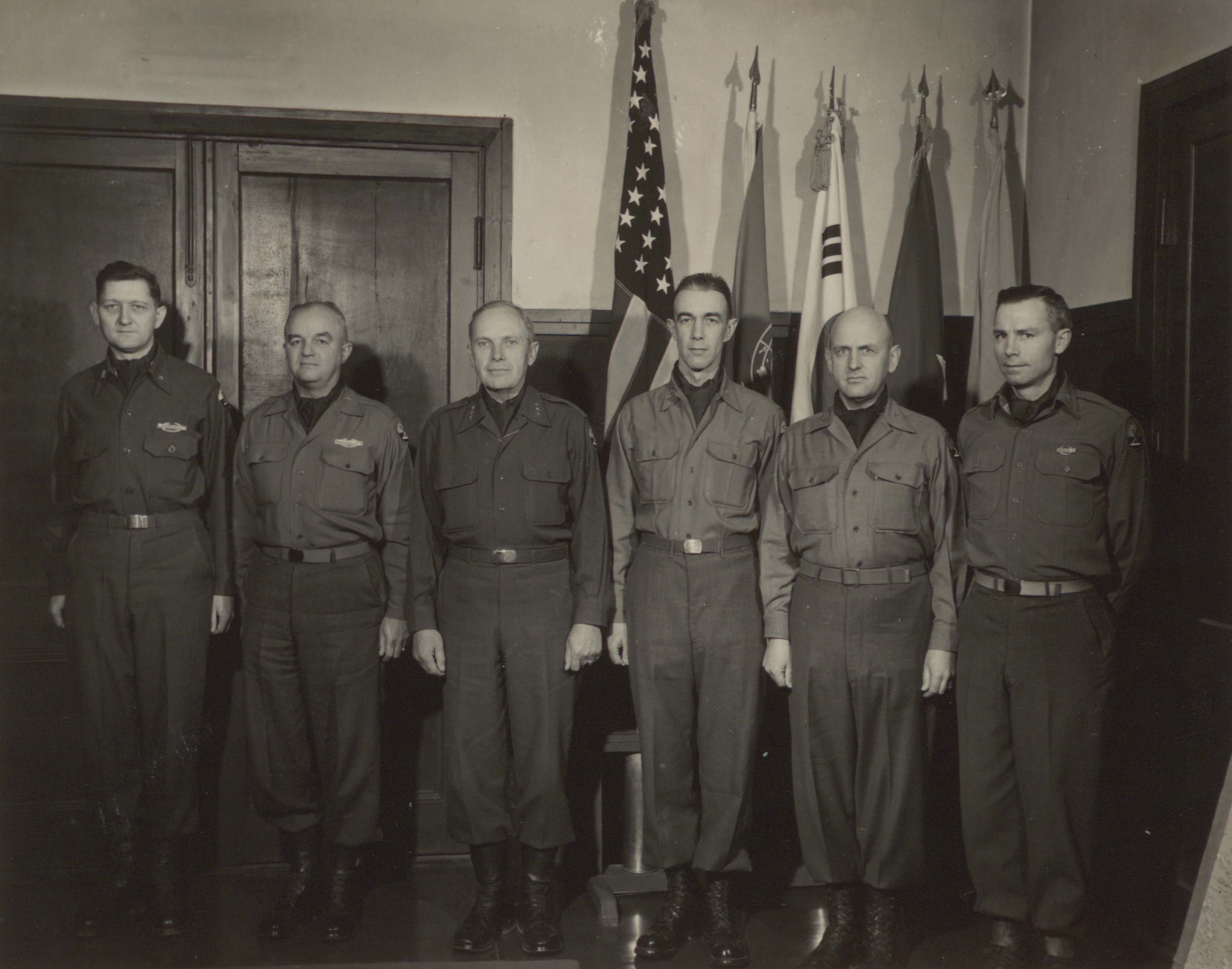
Rowny (far left) with other members of the Edward Almond's X Corps staff c. 1951

Rowny commanded troops in World War II, Korea and Vietnam. After the 92nd Infantry Division suffered heavy casualties in the invasion of Italy in 1944, Rowny was brought in as a battalion commander that drove the Germans up the Western coast of Italy until the end of the war. A day after the end of World War II in Europe, he was assigned to planning the invasion of Japan.

Assigned to General Douglas MacArthur, Rowny became MacArthur's spokesman and one of the planners of the landing of Inchon (September 15, 1950), which forced a North Korean retreat and enabled the taking of Seoul. Rowny air dropped a bridge to cross a chasm permitting the rescue of the surrounded Marines and Army troops at the Chosin Reservoir. He was in charge of the evacuation of United States troops which rescued one hundred thousand North Koreans who wished to join South Korea.

In 1965/66, Rowny commanded the 24th Mechanized Infantry Division in Augsburg, West Germany.

During the Vietnam War, Rowny tested the helicopter as a platform for the Army to fight insurgency. Subsequently, as deputy chief to General Andrew P. O'Meara he was in charge of relocation of NATO troops from France.

In 1971 Rowny was appointed the US representative to Strategic Arms Limitation Talks (SALT) and held this post under three presidents: Nixon, Ford and Carter. He also served as the NATO Deputy Chairman of the Military Committee from 1971 to 1973. In June, 1979 he retired from the Army in protest over President Carter's signing of the SALT II Treaty which he believed would undermine United States security. He subsequently led the fight to prevent the Congress from ratifying the SALT II Treaty. After the election of President Reagan, General Rowny was appointed to the rank of Ambassador as the President's chief negotiator on Strategic Nuclear Arms (START). During his second term, President Reagan appointed Rowny his Special Advisor on Arms Control. He was awarded the Presidential Citizen Medal with the citation: "Rowny was one of the chief architects of peace through strength", Rowny continued as President George H.W. Bush's special advisor for arms control for the first two years of his term.

== Later life ==
In 1990, Rowny retired from the Government after fifty years of Government service to become an international consultant on negotiations. He also began advising the Administration and Congress on National Security matters and combating terrorism which he continued to do until his death in late 2017. In 1992 he authored It Takes One to Tango, a memoir of his service to five presidents and his dealings with the Soviets.

In 1992, Rowny fulfilled his fifty-year ambition to return the remains of Ignacy Jan Paderewski to Poland. Paderewski was not only a famous composer and pianist but an eminent statesman. He inspired the 13th of President Wilson's 14 points for the Versailles Treaty which resurrected a free and democratic Poland. Paderewski became Poland's first Prime Minister a post he held from 1918 to 1921.

In 2003, Ambassador Rowny became the Vice President of the American Polish Advisory Council (APAC) an organization which promotes Polonia's Agenda and encourages them to vote and become government officials. When President Nicholas Rey died in 2007 Rowny became President of APAC an office he held until his death.

In 2004, Rowny established the Paderewski Scholarship Fund to bring Polish University students to Georgetown University to study American style democracy.

In 2005, the 25th anniversary of Solidarity, he received the Truman-Reagan Medal of Freedom from the Victims of Communism Memorial Foundation, along with John Paul II, Anna Walentynowicz and the ten million unsung heroes of first free trade union, Solidarity.

In 2007, Rowny received the Walter Judd Freedom Award from The Fund for American Studies.

In October 2013, Rowny's autobiography Smokey Joe and the General was released and among the achievements cited in it that he designed and dropped the bridge to get soldiers and Marines out of Chosin Reservoir.

In May 2014, Rowny was awarded a Doctorate of Laws, Honoris Causa from The Institute of World Politics.

South Korea Prime Minister Chung Hong-won, in a commemorative ceremony in Seoul on July 27, 2014, awarded Rowny the Order of Military Merit, Taeguk, South Korea's highest military award.

== Personal life ==
Rowny married Elizabeth Ladd in 1994 and was the father of five children with his former wife, Mary Rita Leyko, who died in 1988.

Rowny turned 100 in April 2017. Mateusz Morawiecki, Deputy Prime Minister of Poland, came to Rowny's home to congratulate him in person.

On June 9, 2017, the 100-year-old Rowny attended the funeral for Polish-American statesman Zbigniew Brzezinski at the Cathedral of St. Matthew in Washington, D.C.

== Death ==
Rowny died from cardiomyopathy on December 17, 2017, at the age of 100. He was buried in Arlington National Cemetery on June 13, 2018.

== Awards and decorations ==
Combat Infantryman Badge
Basic Parachutist Badge
Office of the Secretary of Defense Identification Badge

Army Distinguished Service Medal with one bronze oak leaf cluster
Silver Star with two bronze oak leaf clusters
Legion of Merit with two bronze oak leaf clusters
Bronze Star Medal with one oak leaf cluster
Air Medal
Presidential Citizens Medal
American Defense Service Medal
American Campaign Medal
European-African-Middle Eastern Campaign Medal
World War II Victory Medal
Army of Occupation Medal
National Defense Service Medal with one bronze service star
Korean Service Medal with three campaign stars
Armed Forces Expeditionary Medal
Vietnam Service Medal with campaign star
Commander's Cross of the Order of Polonia Restituta
Order of Military Merit (South Korea), 1st Class (2014)
United Nations Korea Medal
United Nations Medal
Republic of Vietnam Campaign Medal

- Truman-Reagan Medal of Freedom, Victims of Communism Memorial Foundation (2005)
- Walter Judd Freedom Award (2007)

== Bibliography ==
- American Polish Advisory Council – Gen. Edward L. Rowny
