= Ranks of the People's Liberation Army Navy =

The ranks in the Chinese People's Liberation Army Navy are similar to those of the People's Liberation Army Ground Force, except that those of the PLA Navy are prefixed by 海军 (Hai Jun) meaning Naval Force or Navy. See Ranks of the People's Liberation Army or the article on an individual rank for details on the evolution of rank and insignia in the PLAN. This article primarily covers the existing ranks and insignia.

From 1956 to 1965, similar insignia were used following the Soviet model, but unlike the Ground and Air Forces, PLAN ratings used shoulder boards for rank insignia. Line corps officers wore gold and blue shoulder boards on the dress uniform, staff corps officers white and blue. The duty uniform boards were a reverse of the dress uniform boards.

== Current ranks ==
=== Officer ranks ===
The current system of officer ranks and insignia dates from 1988 and is a revision of the ranks and insignia used from 1955 to 1965. The rank of Hai Jun Yi Ji Shang Jiang (First Class Admiral) was never held and was abolished in 1994. With the official introduction of the Type 07 uniforms all officer insignia are on either shoulders or sleeves depending on the type of uniform used.

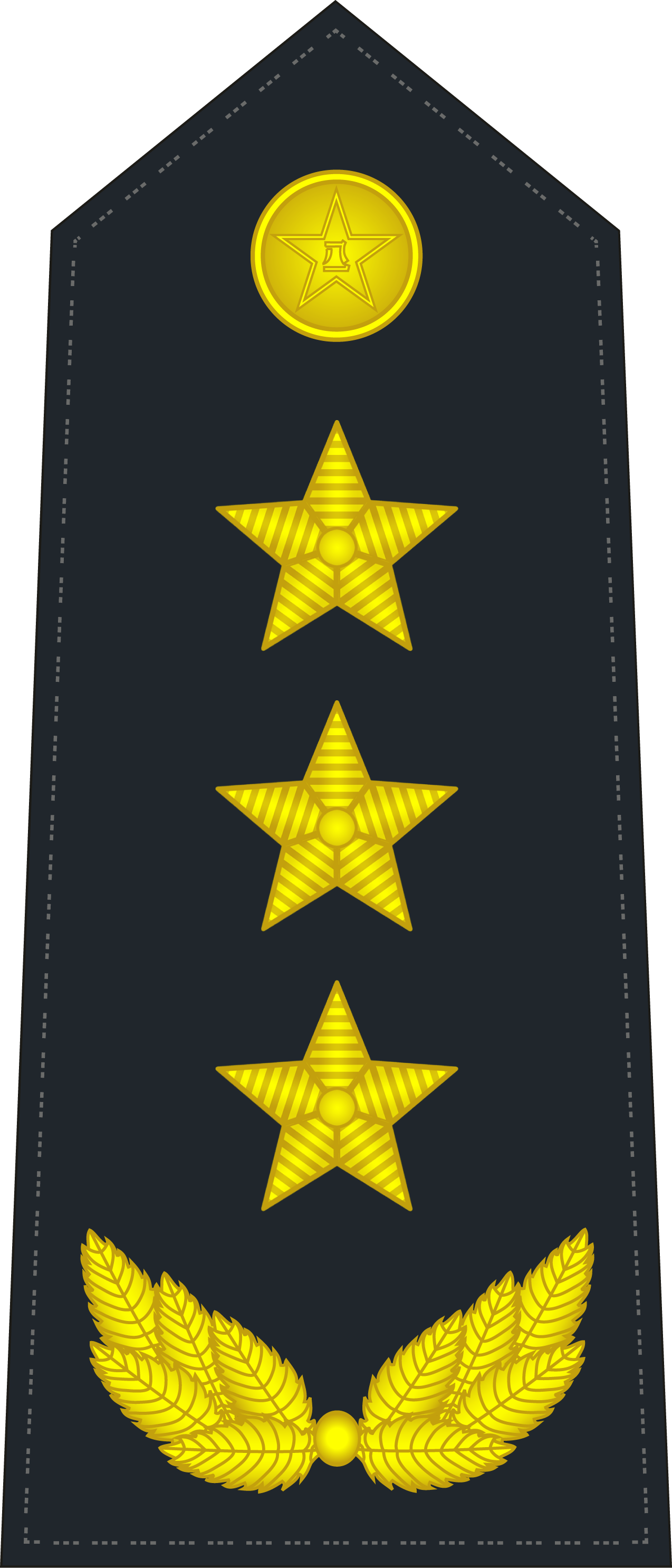
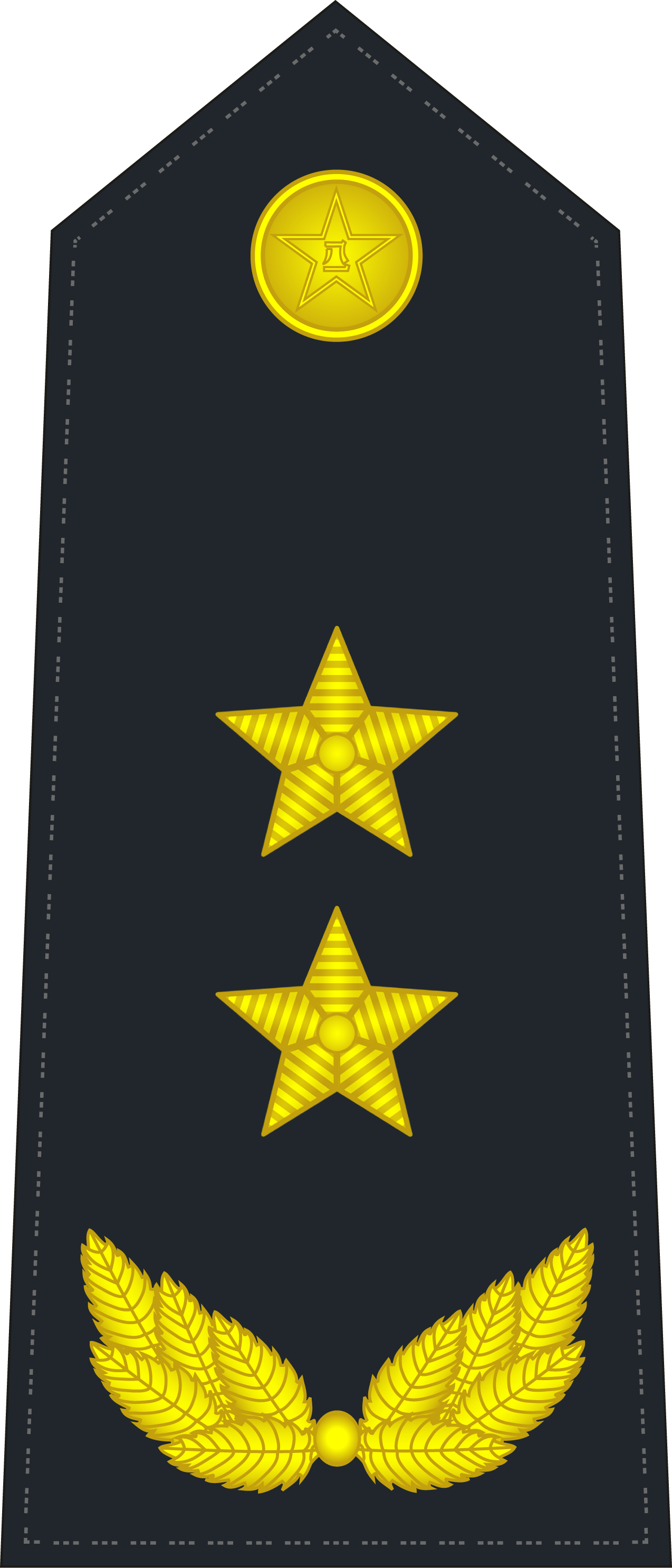
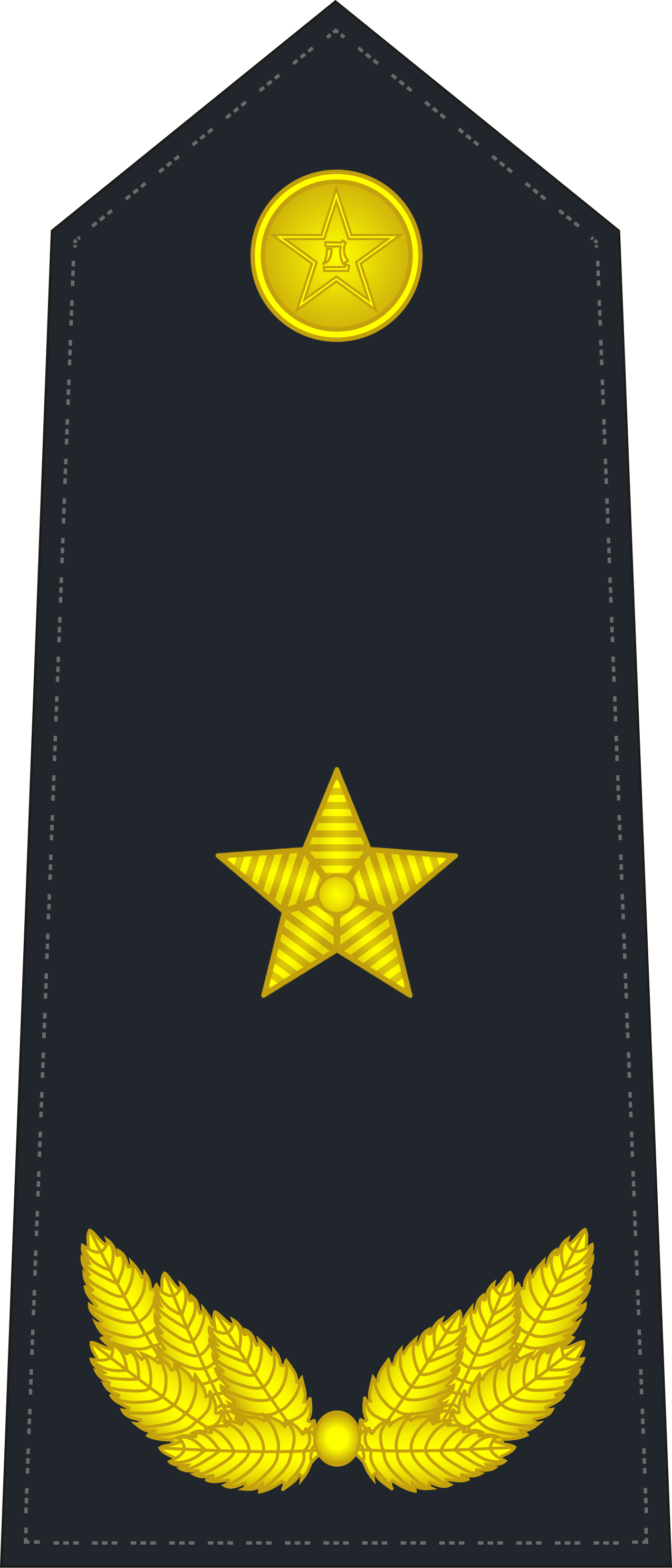
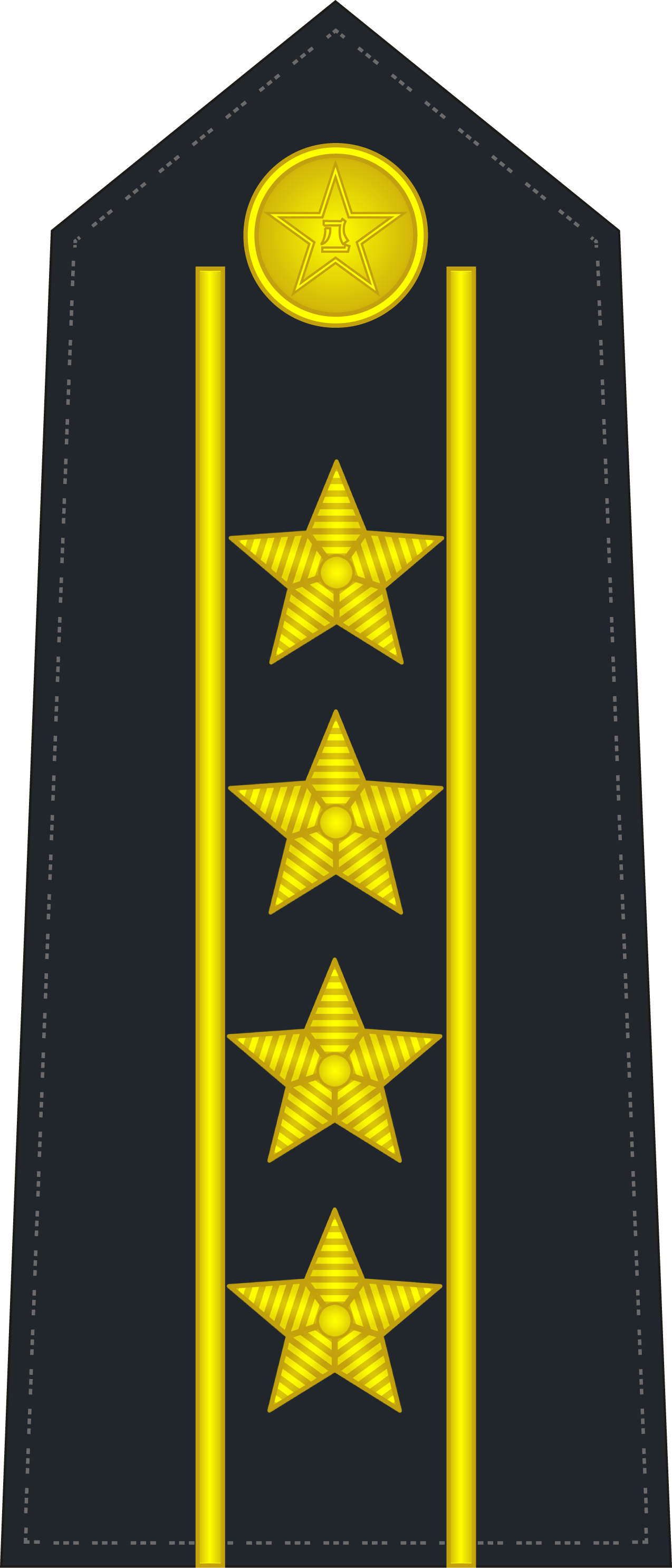
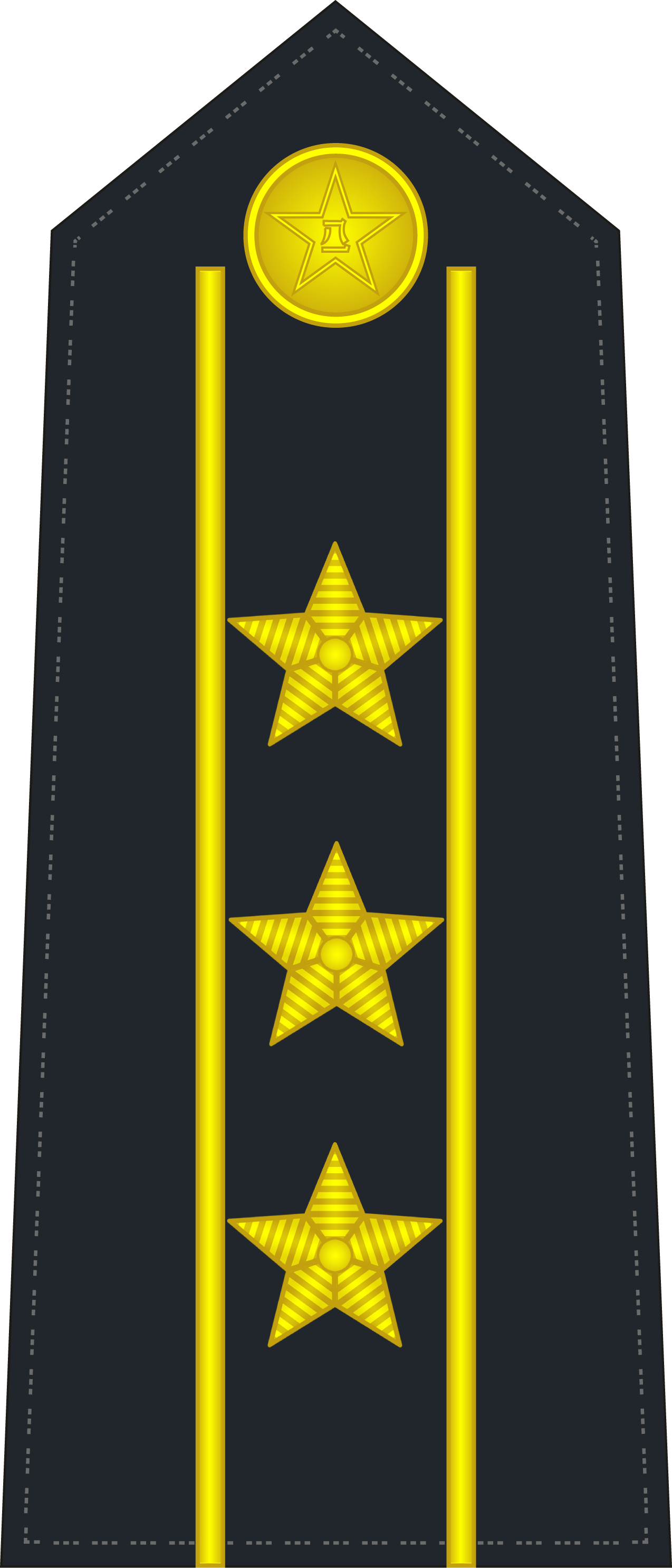
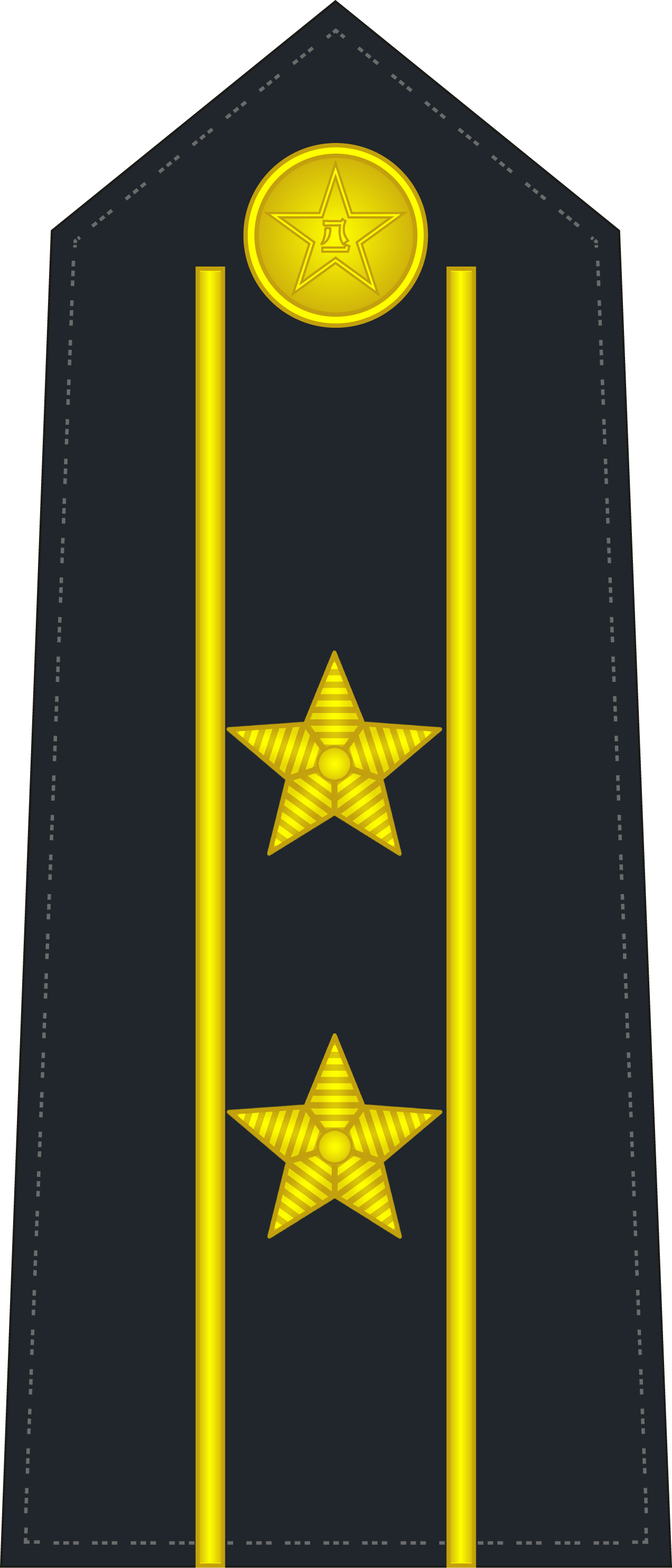
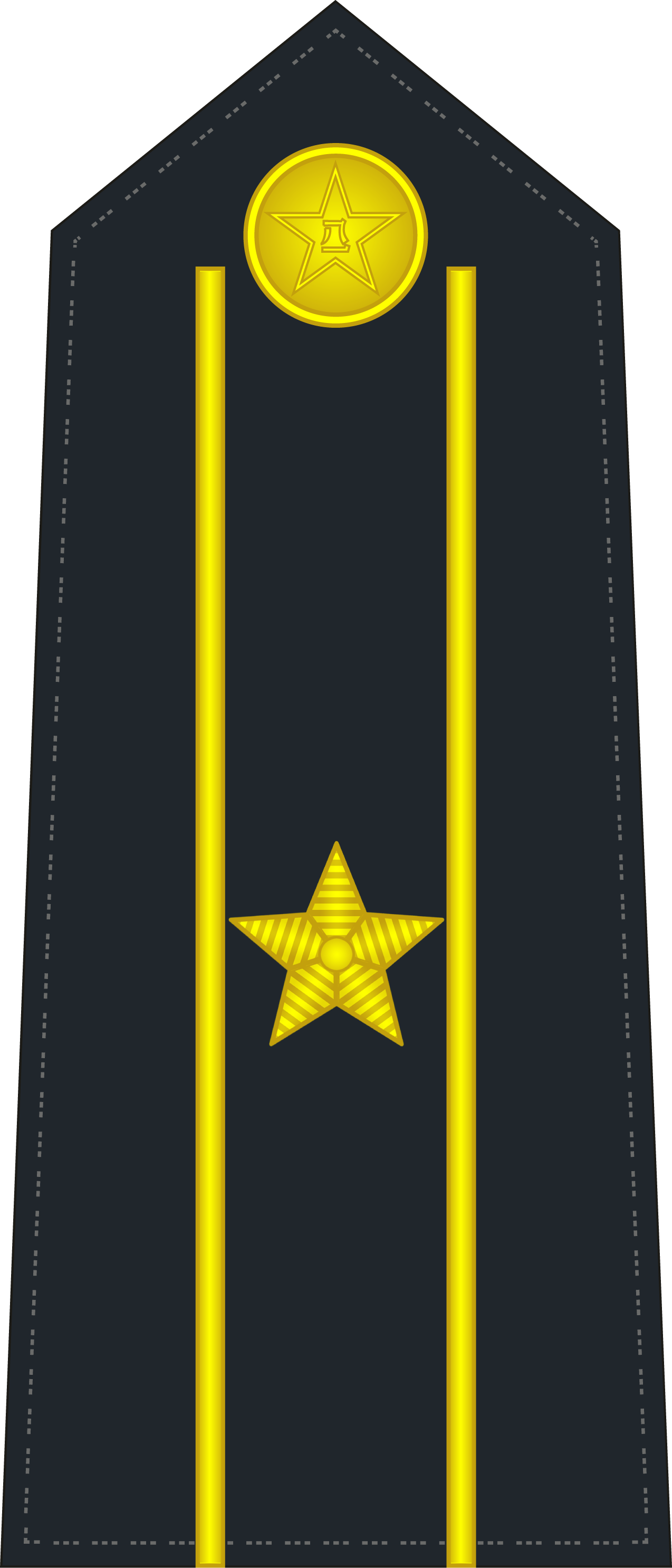
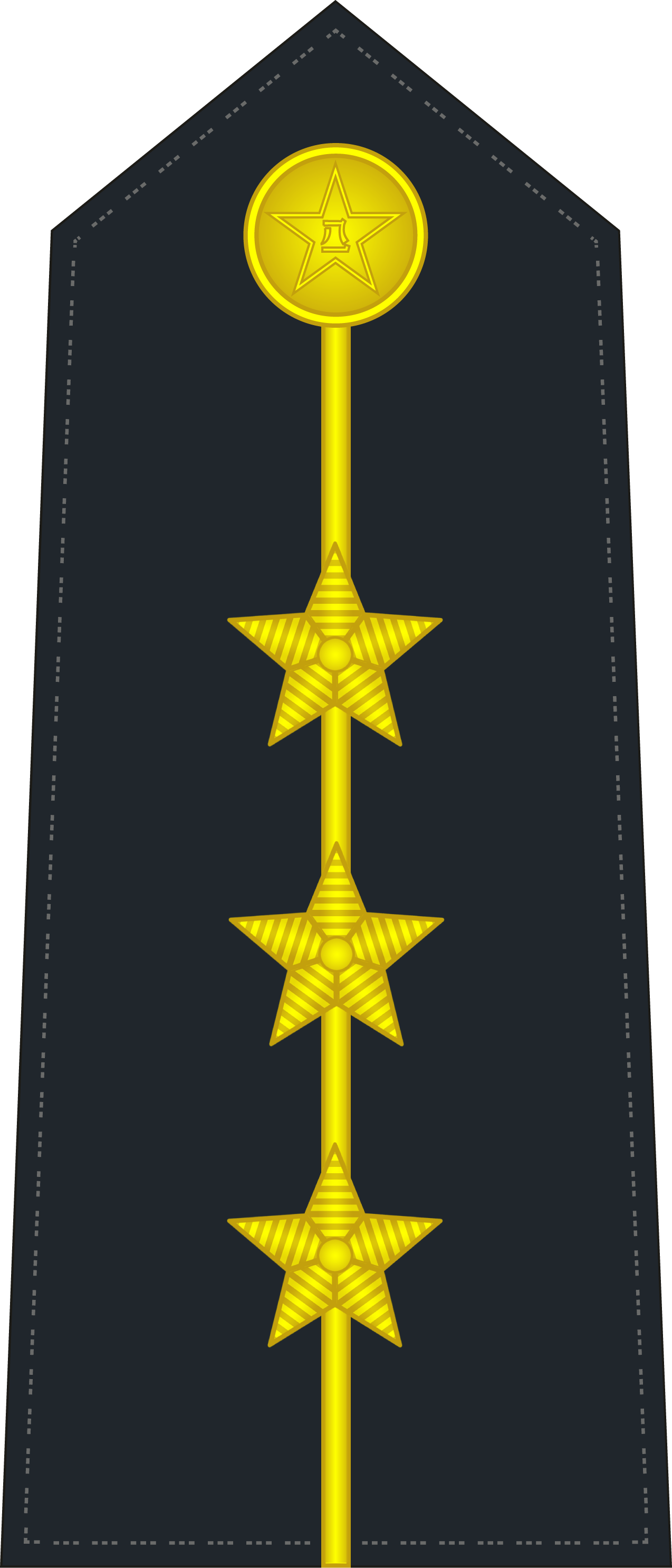
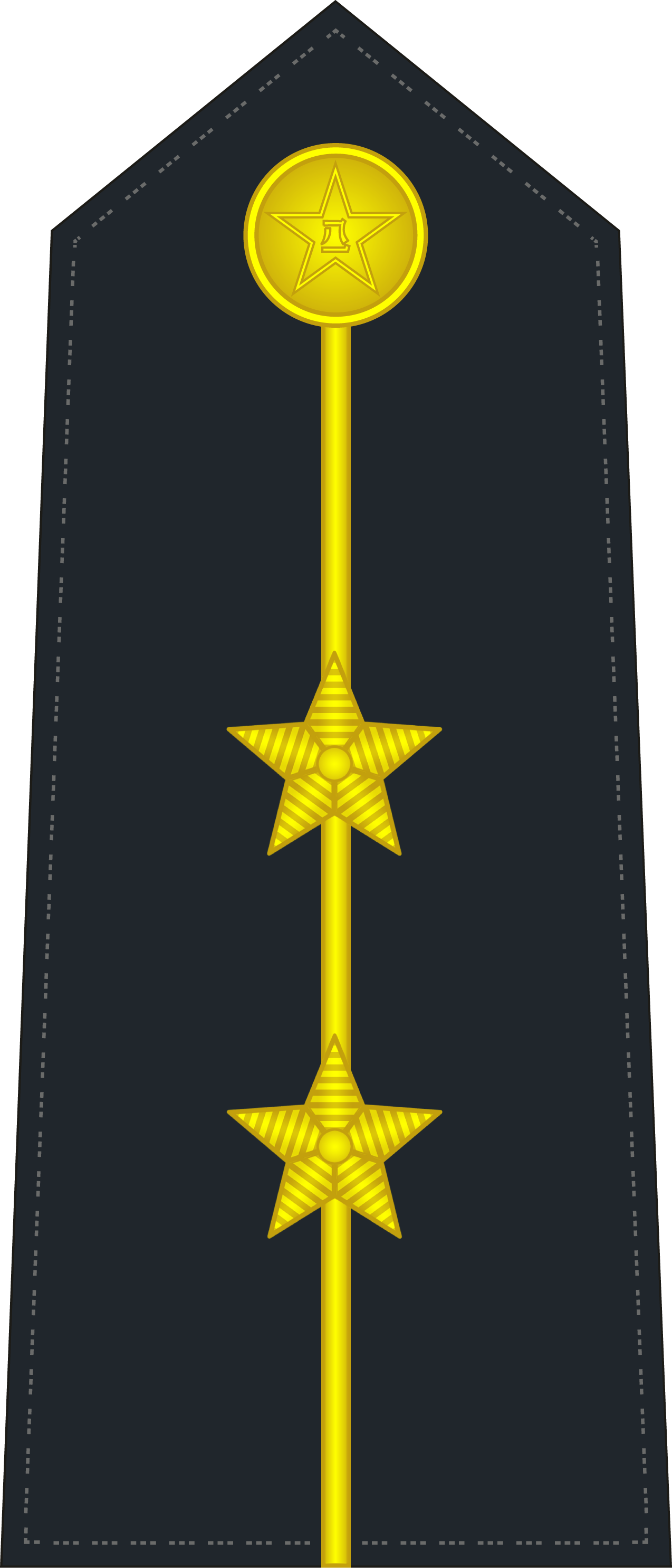
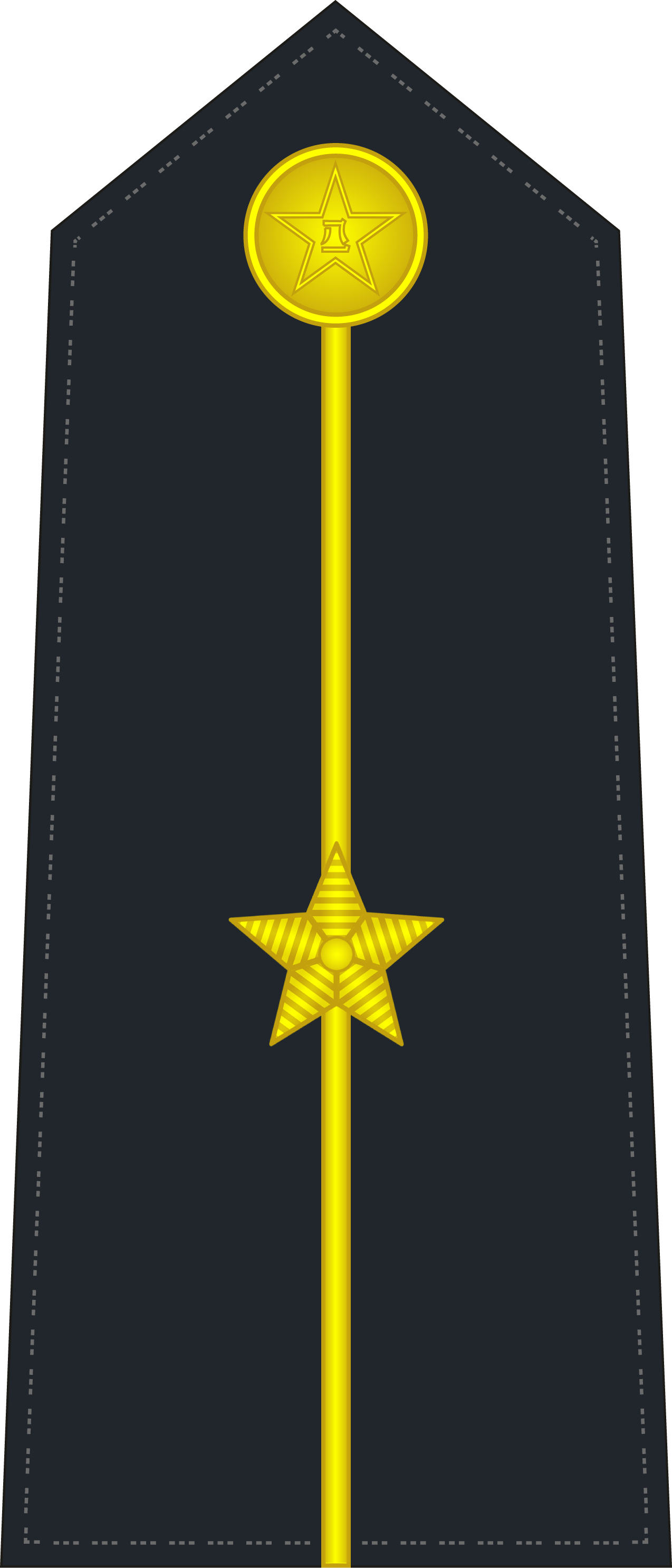
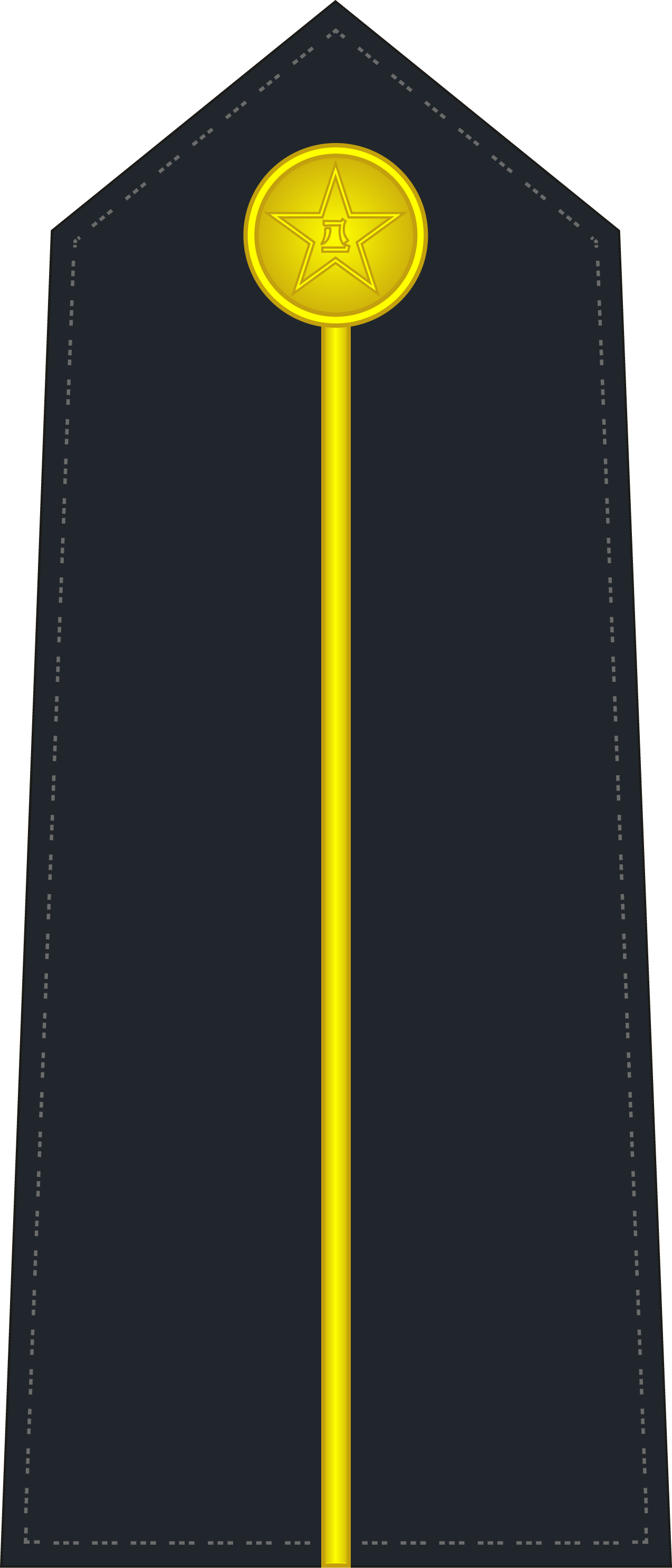
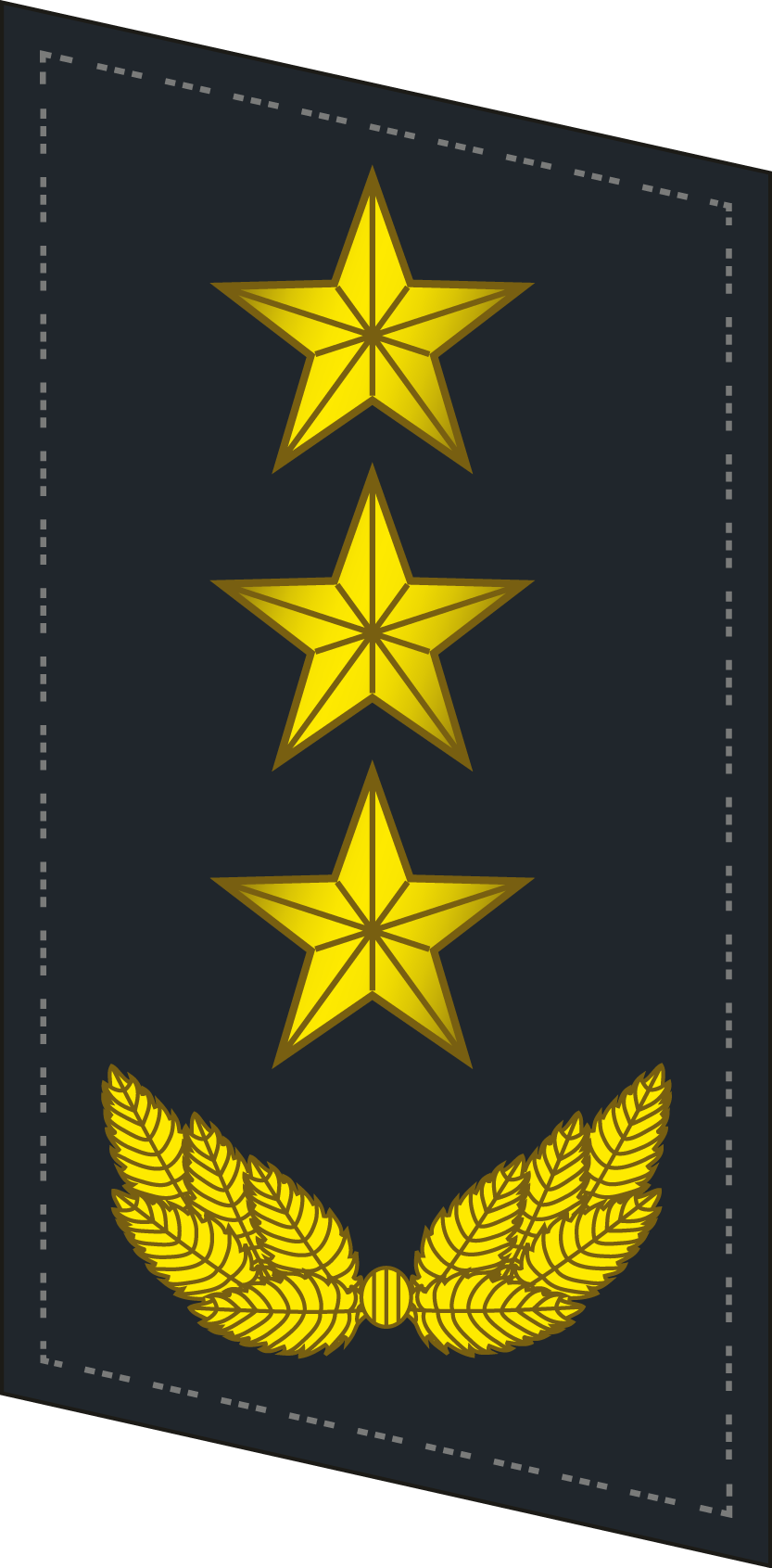
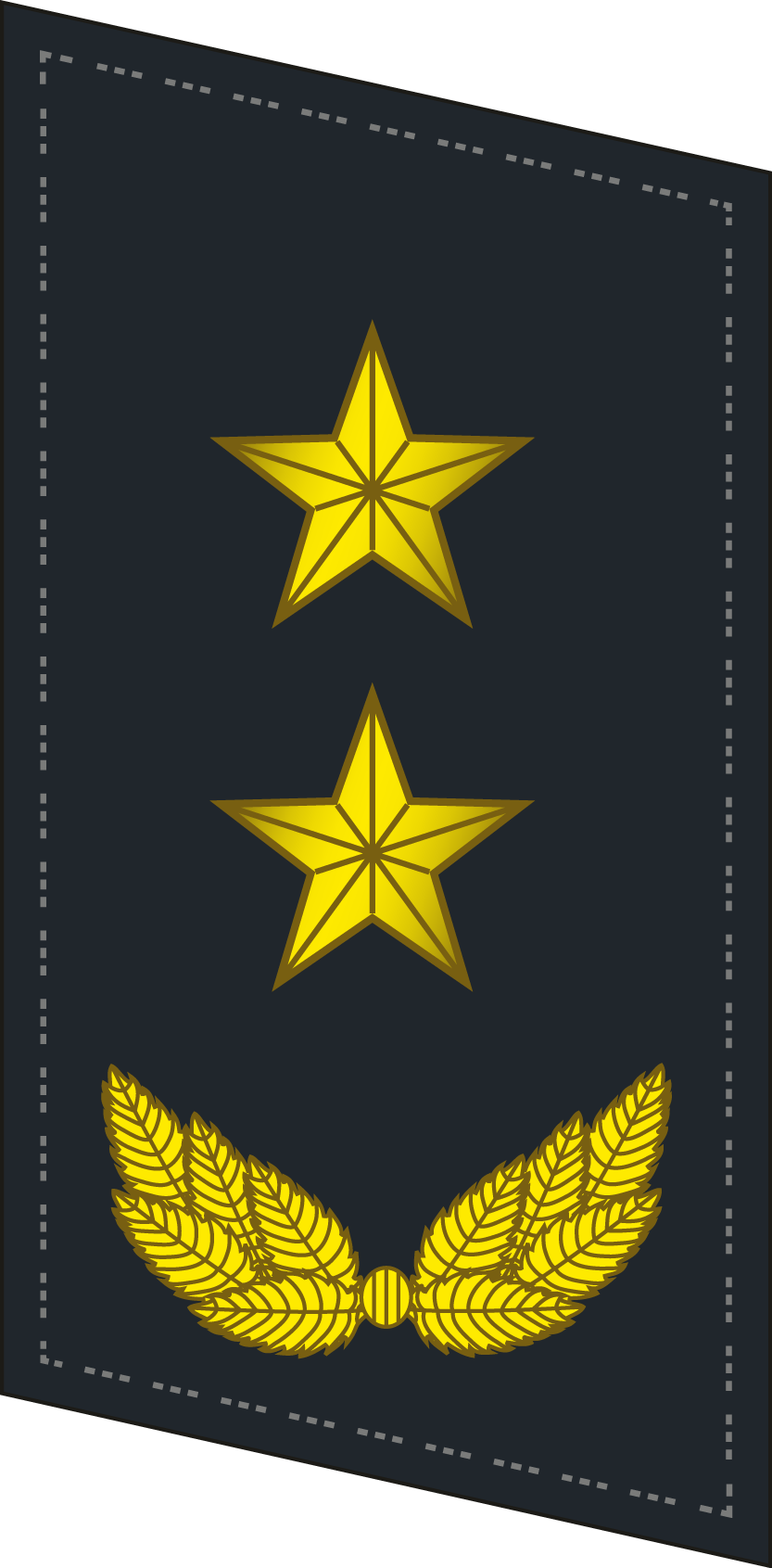
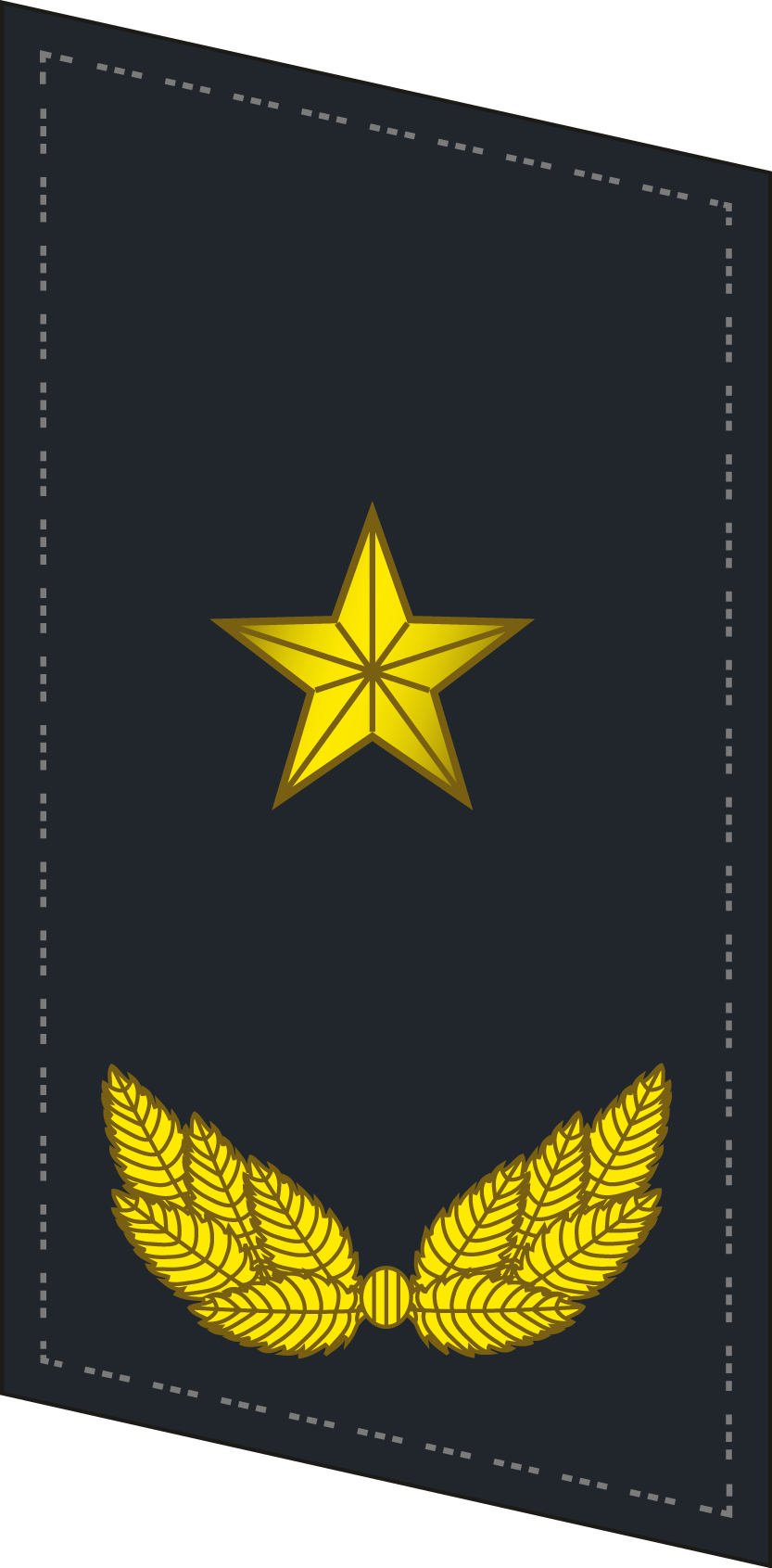
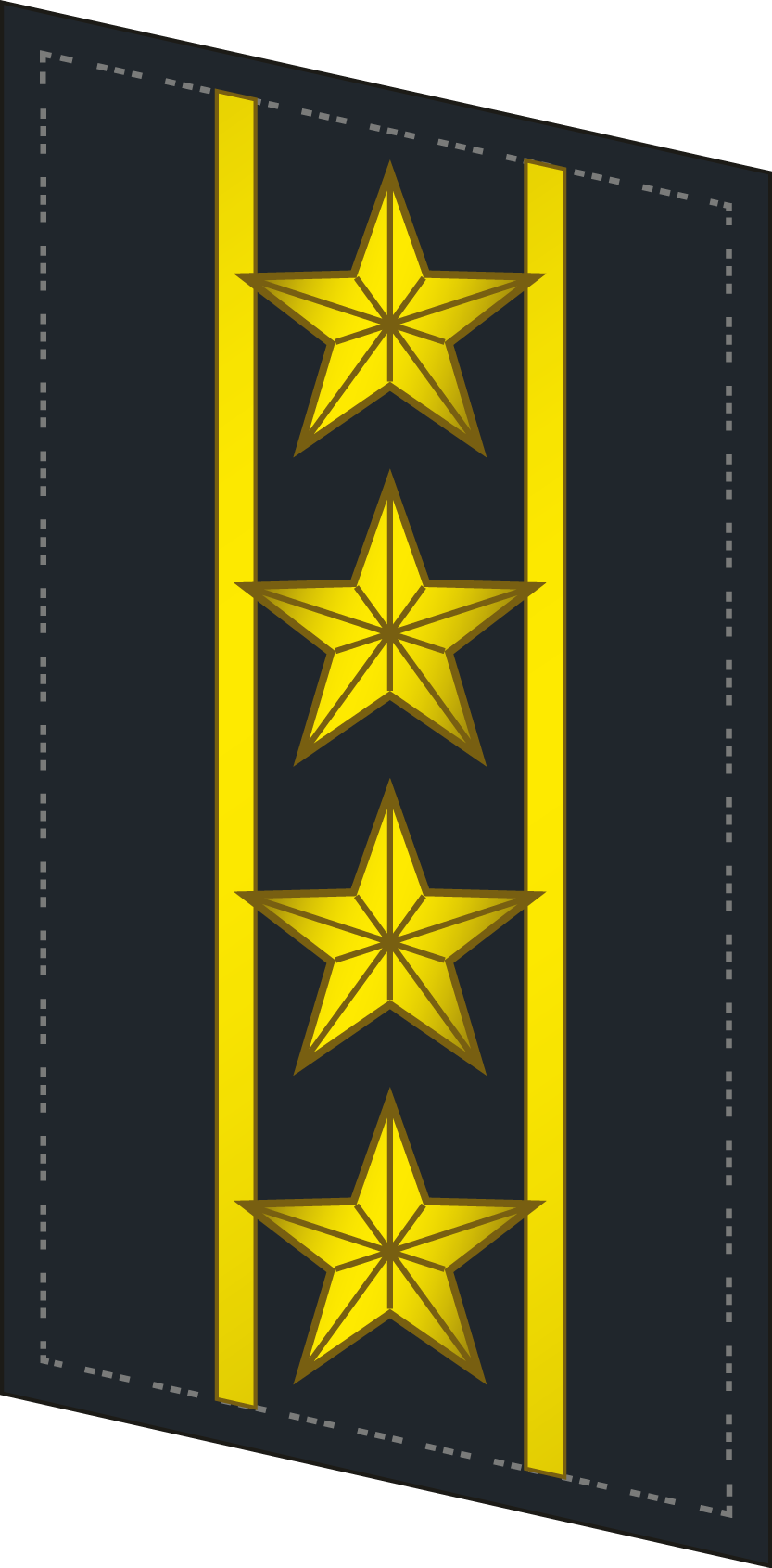
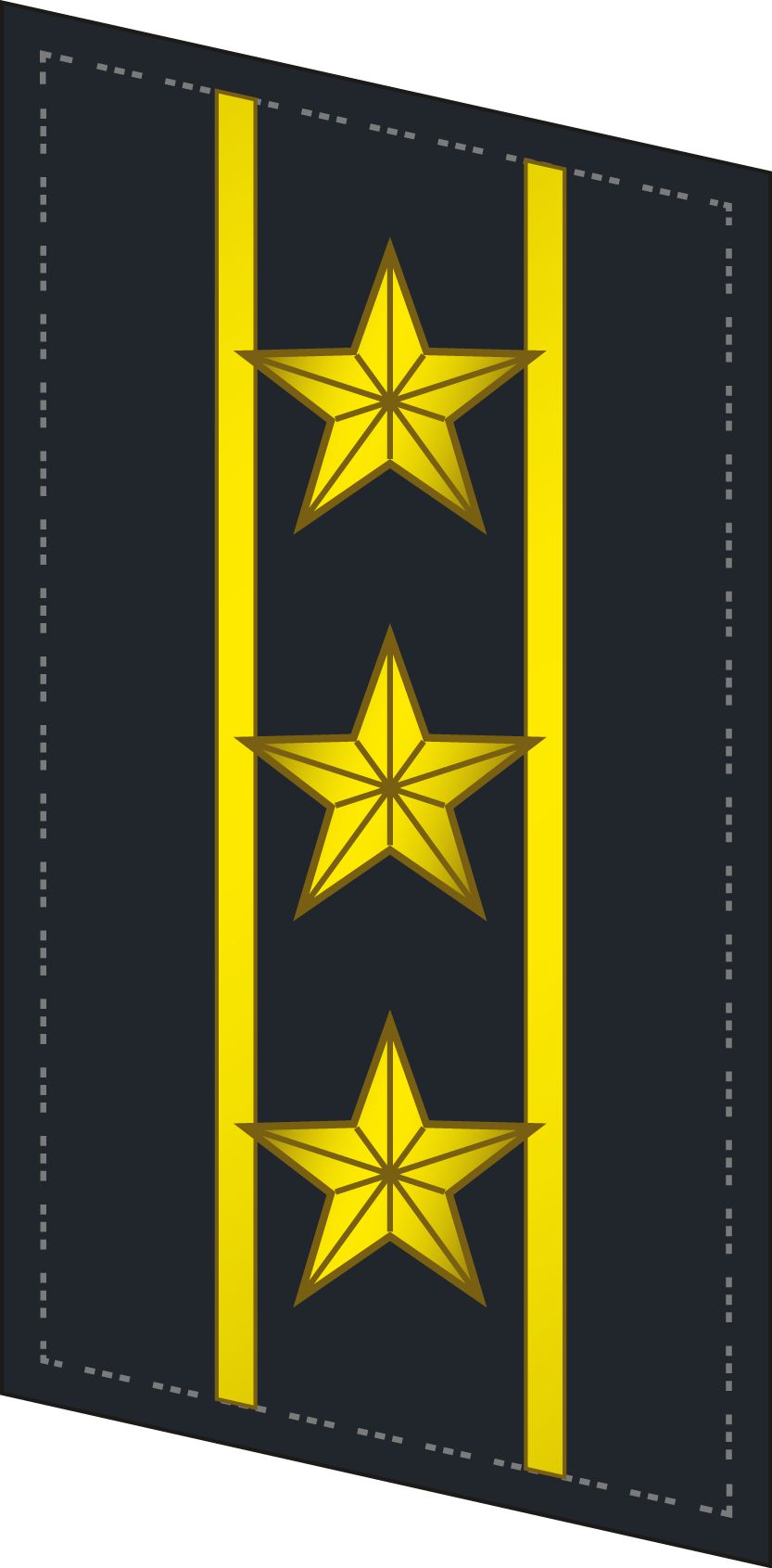
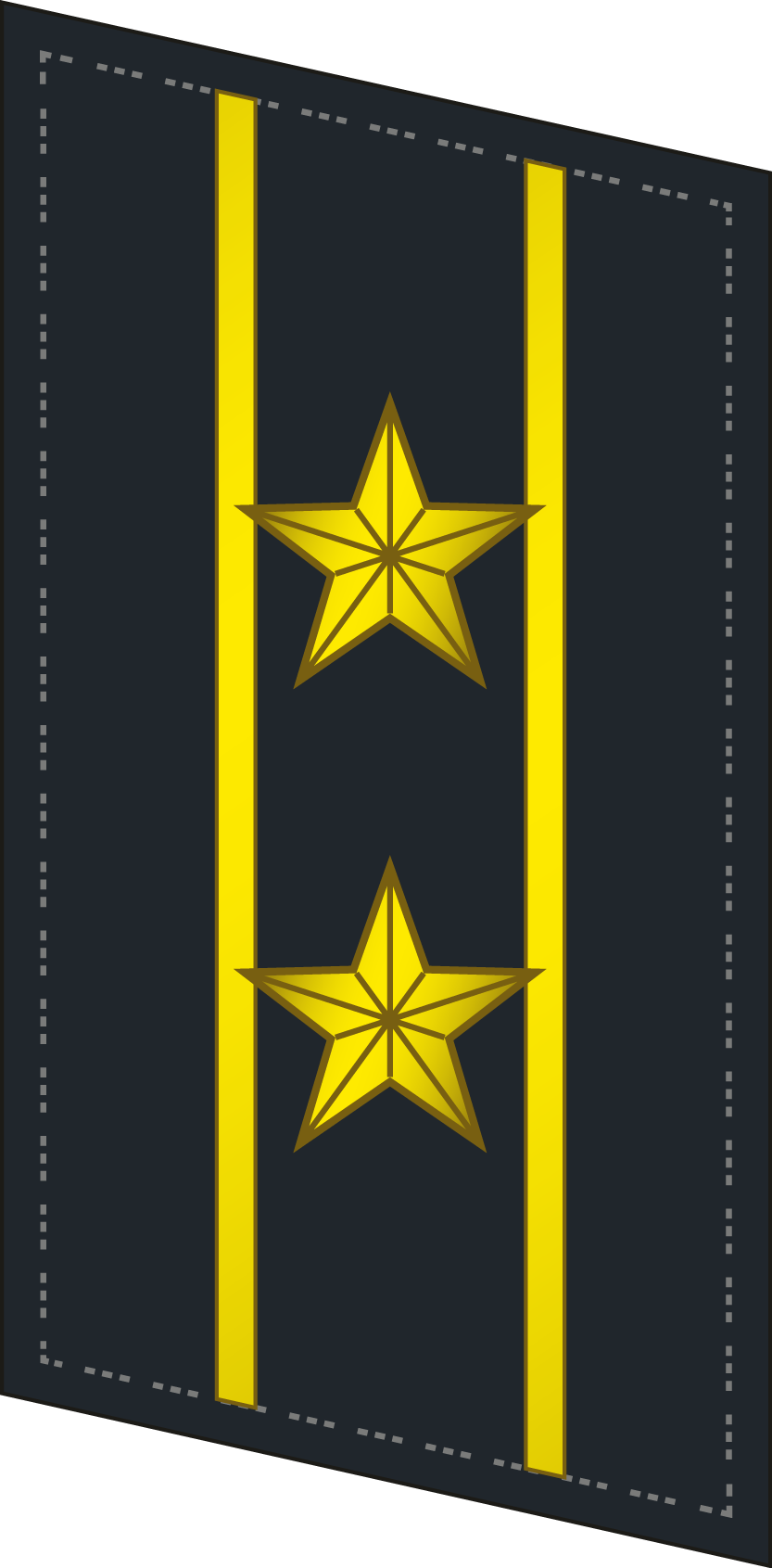
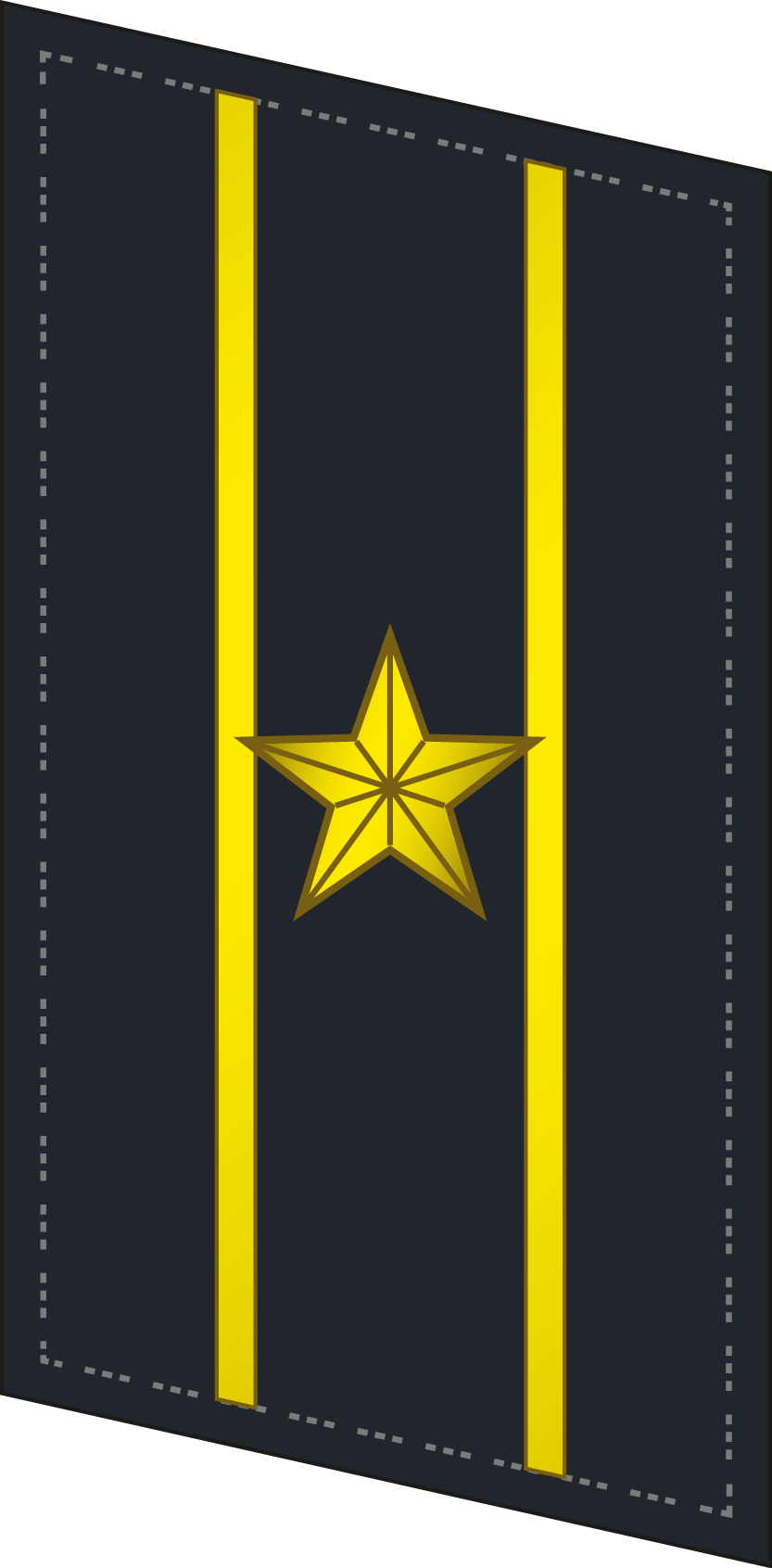
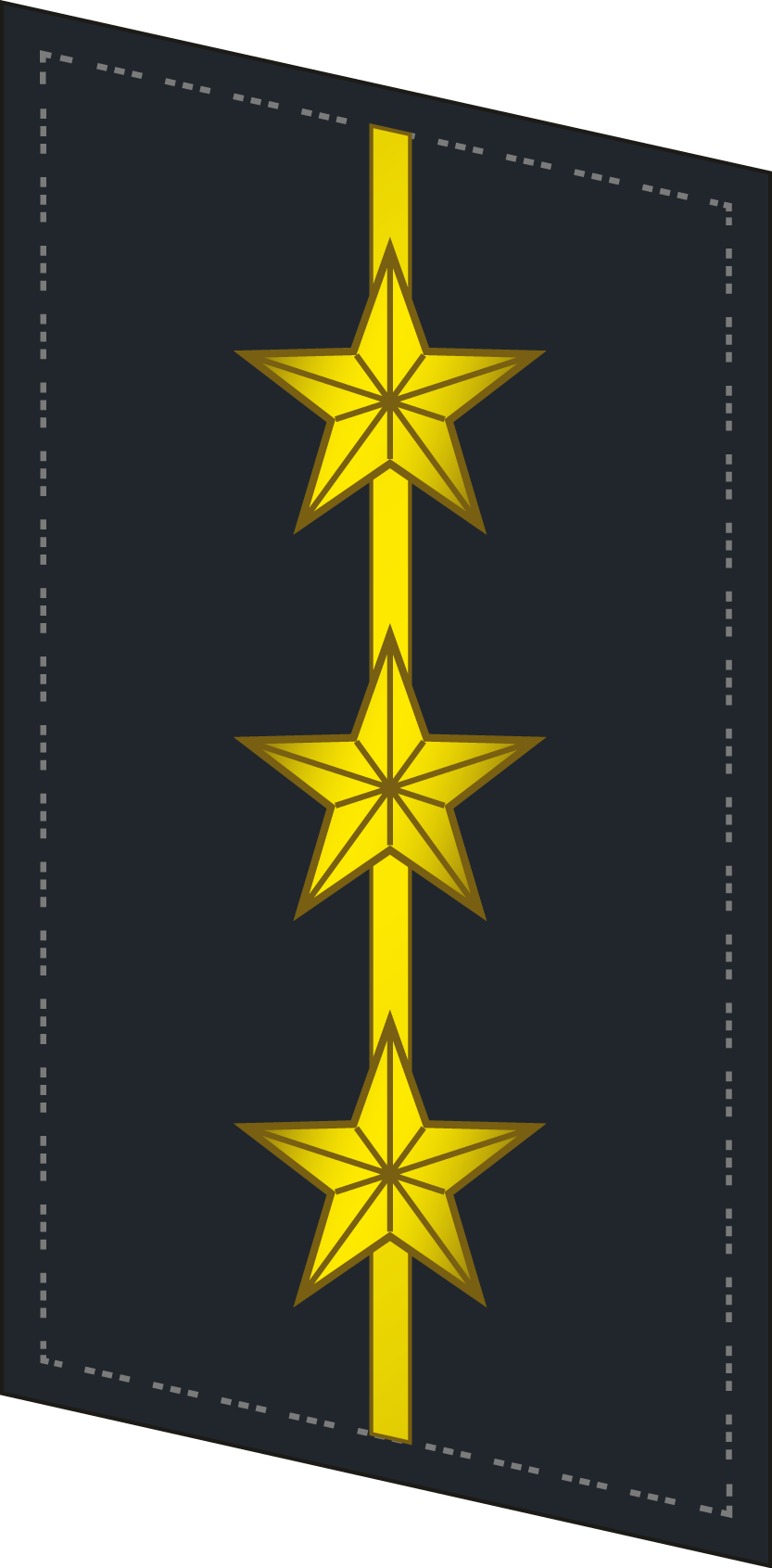
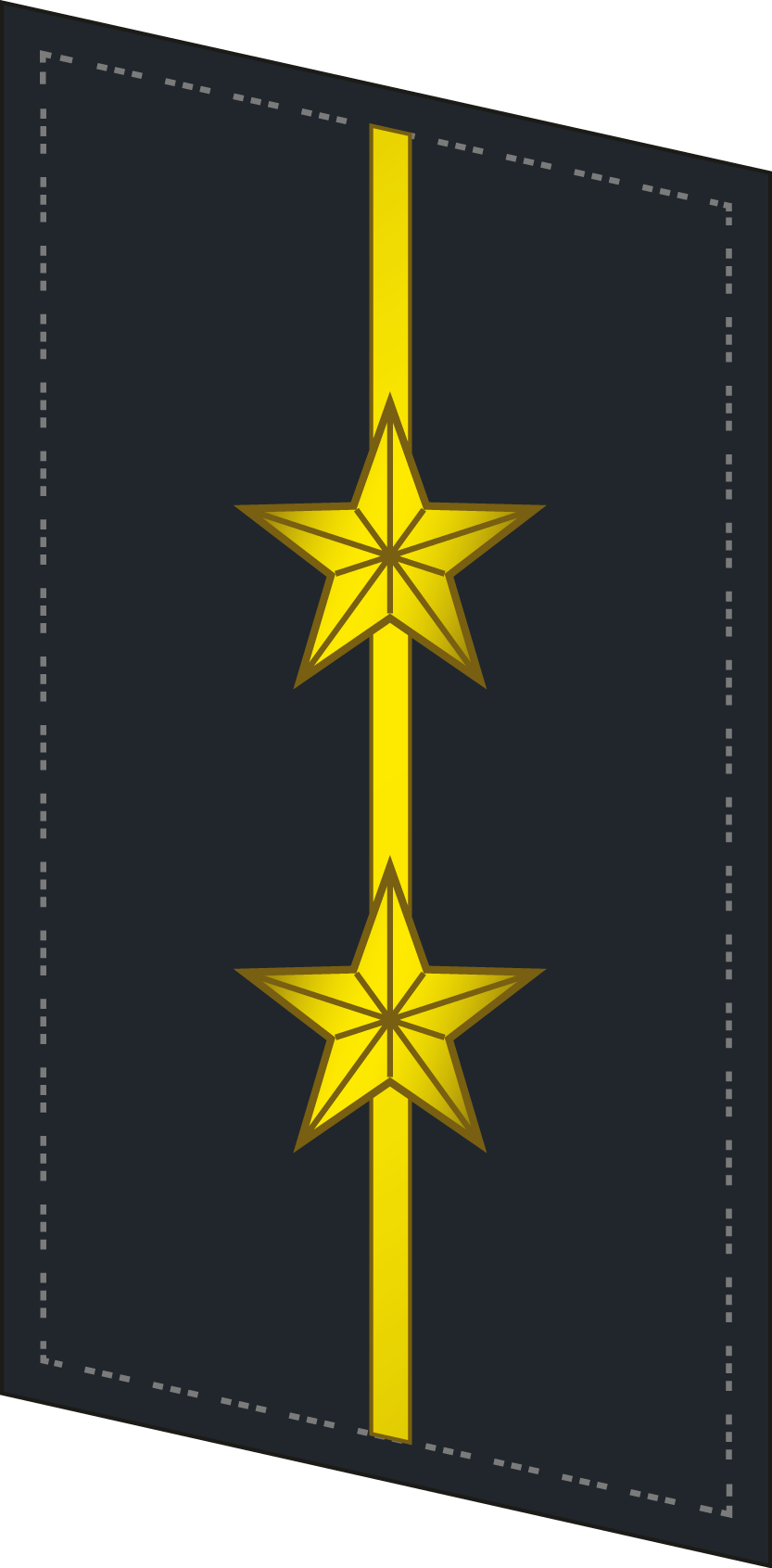
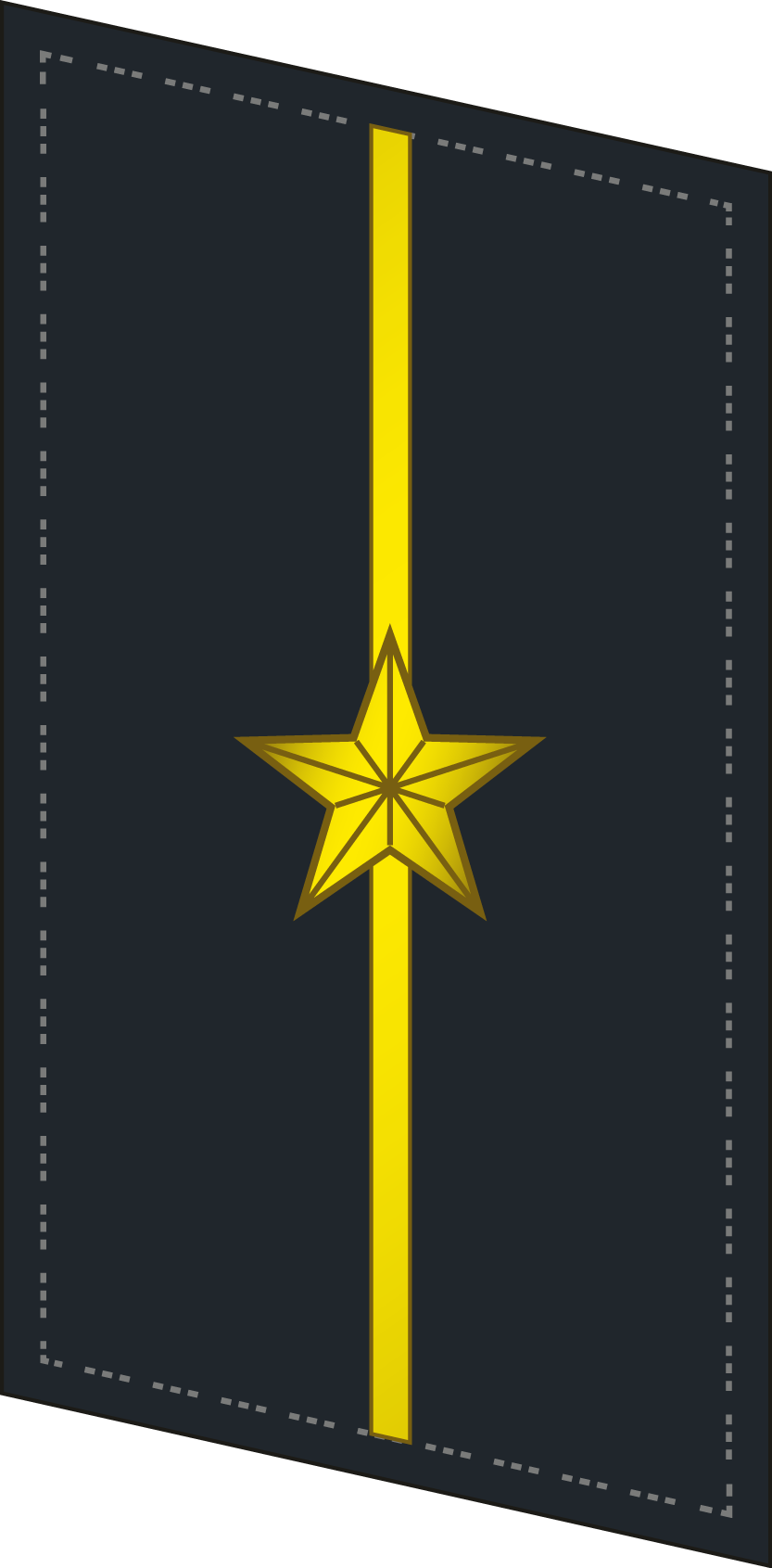
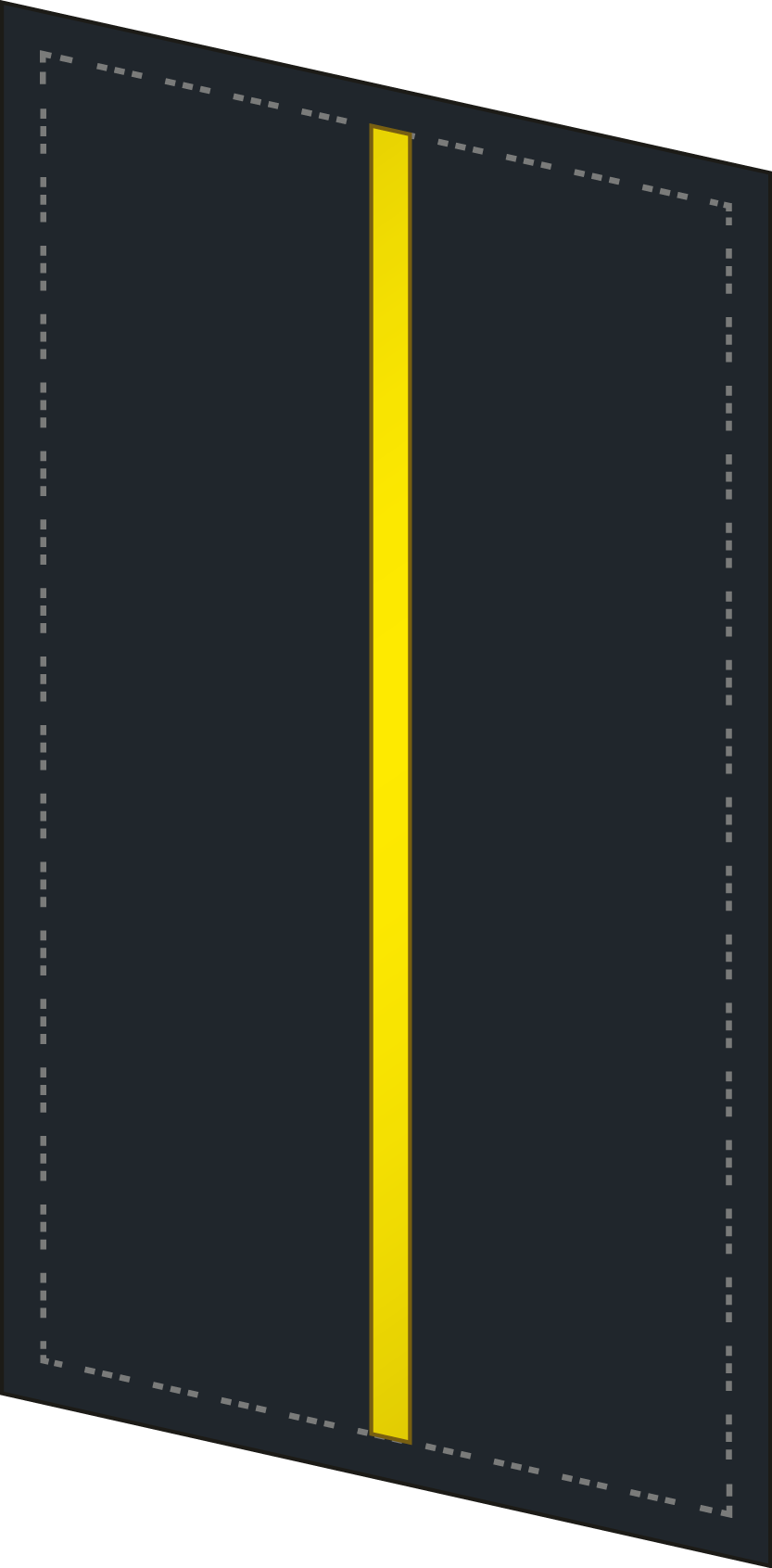
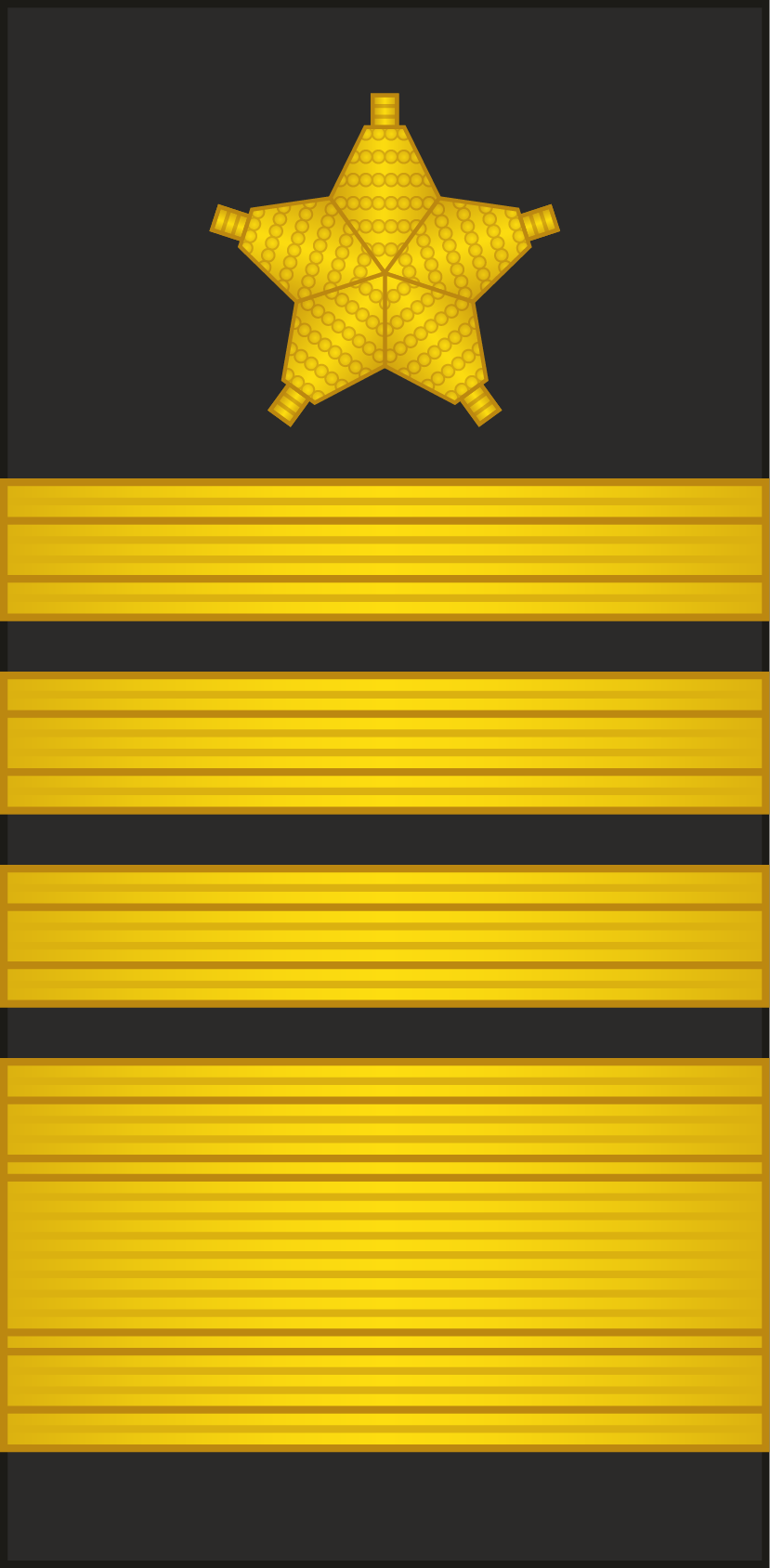
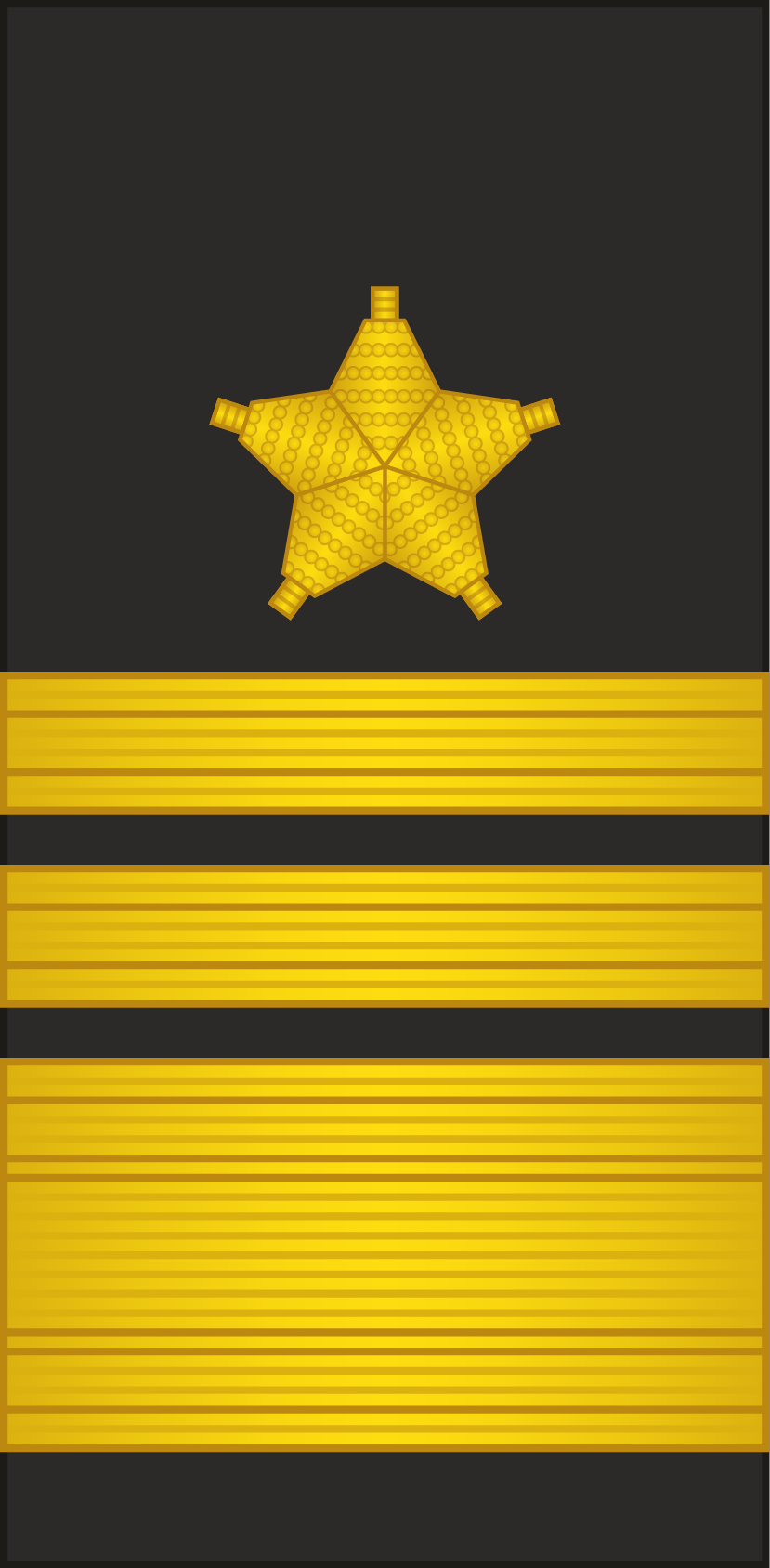
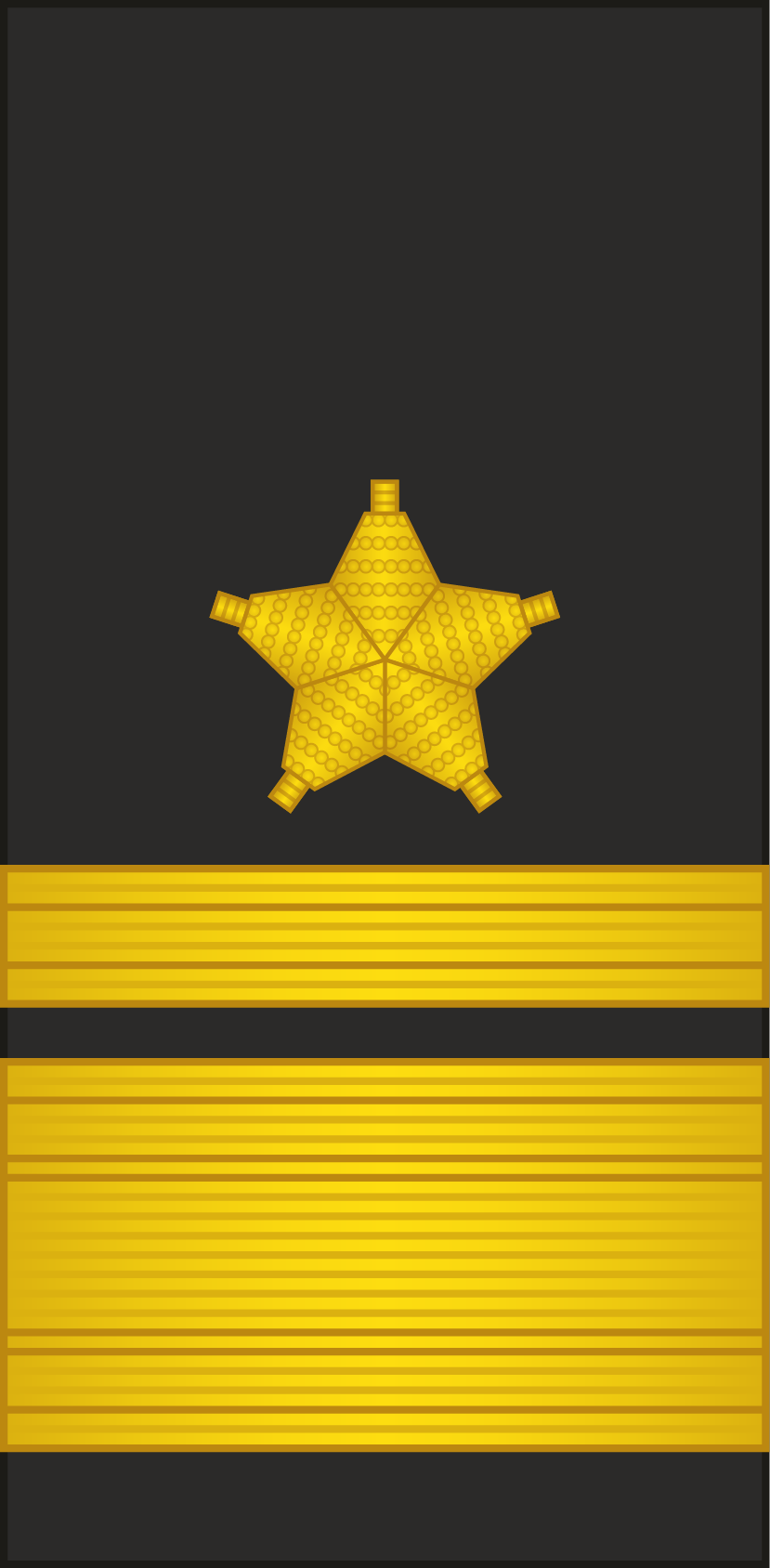
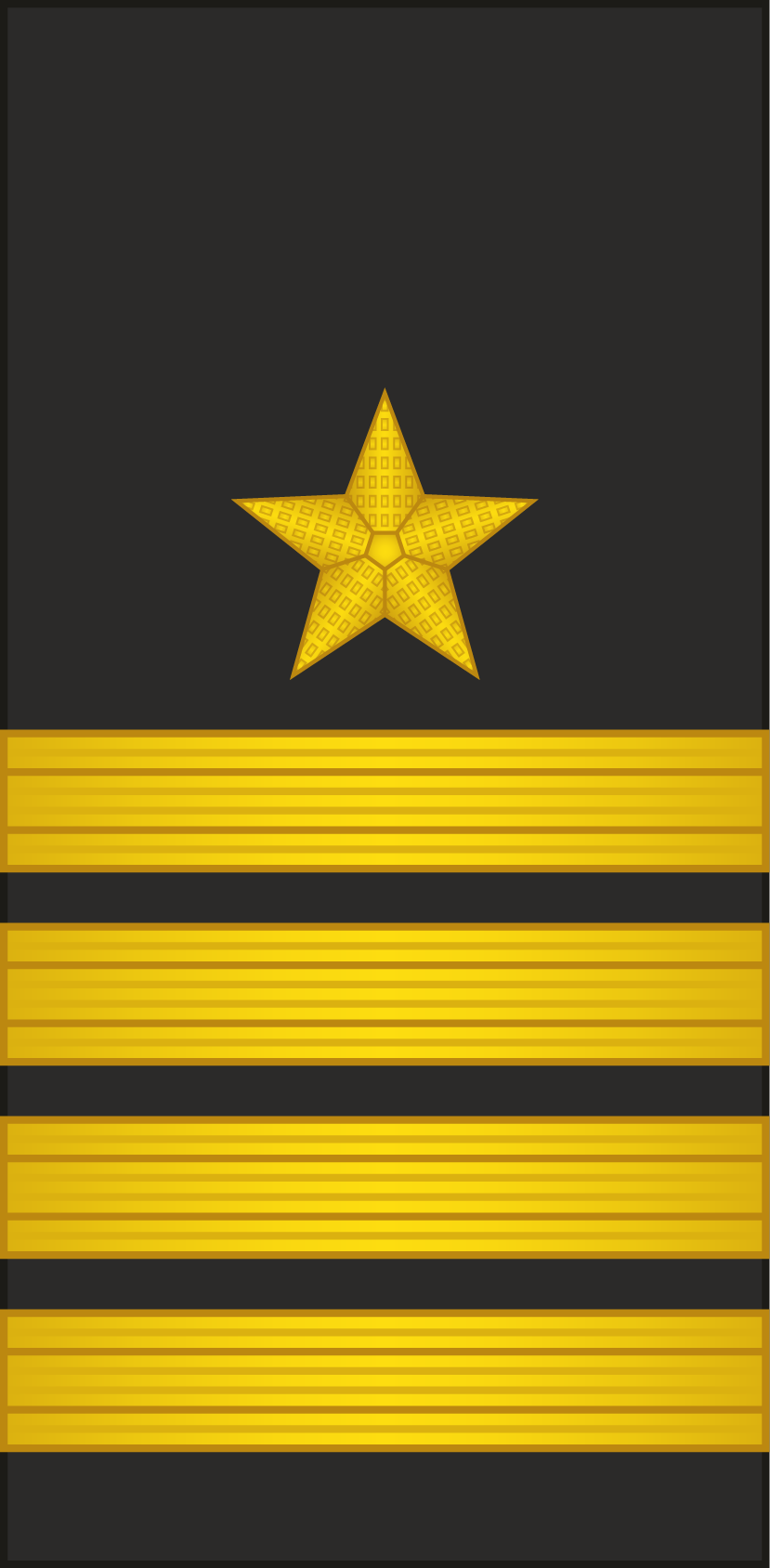
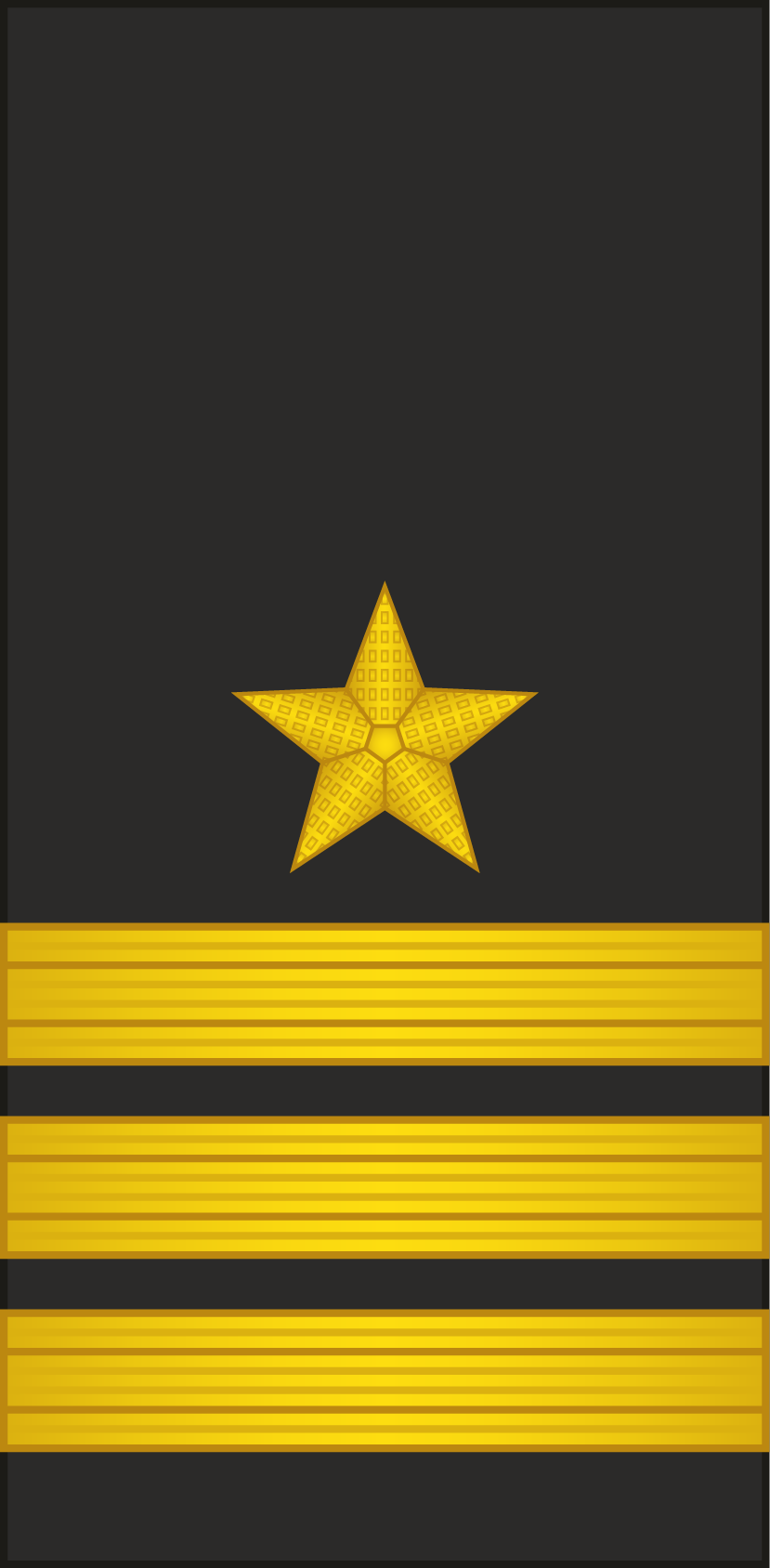
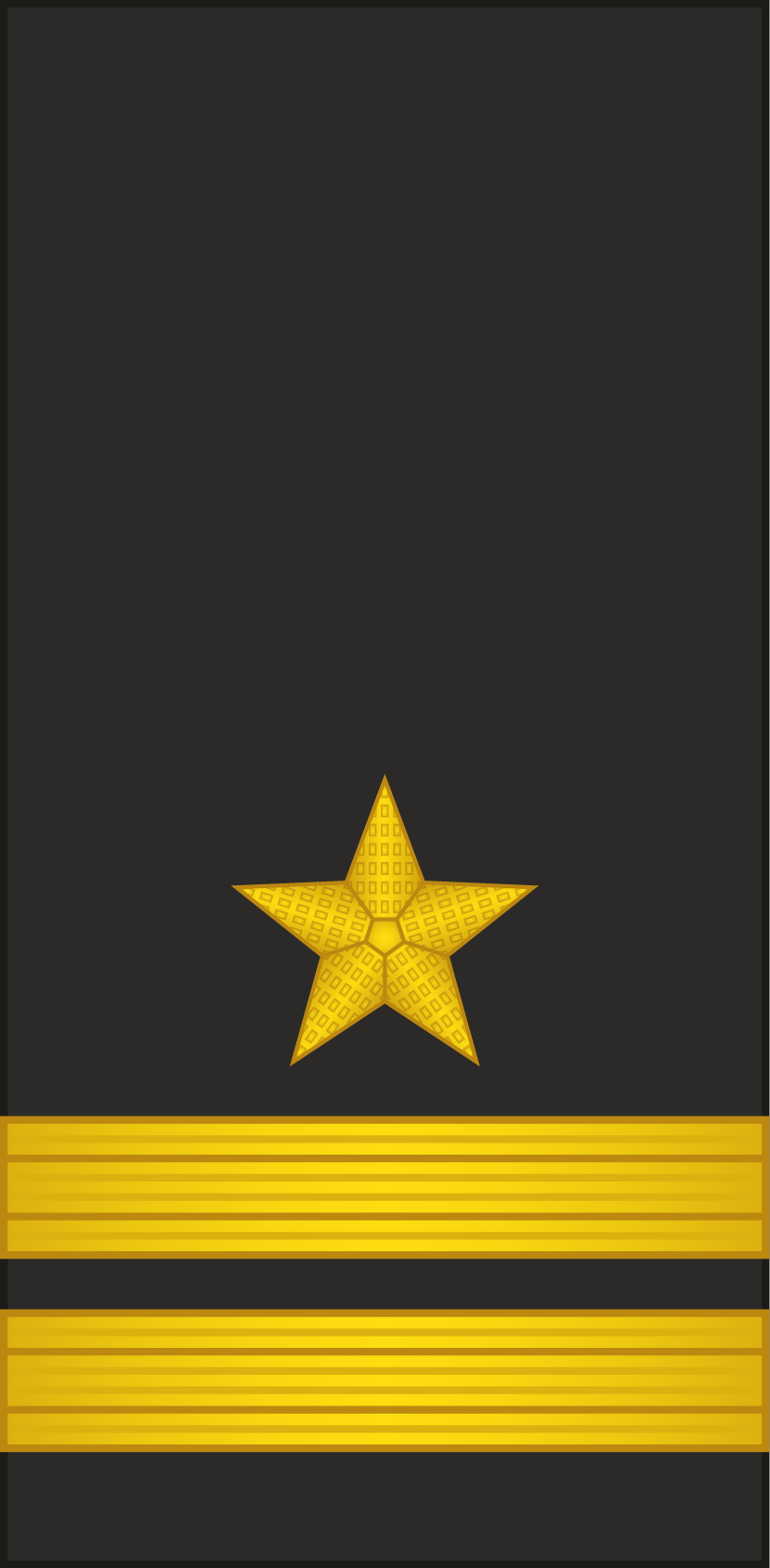
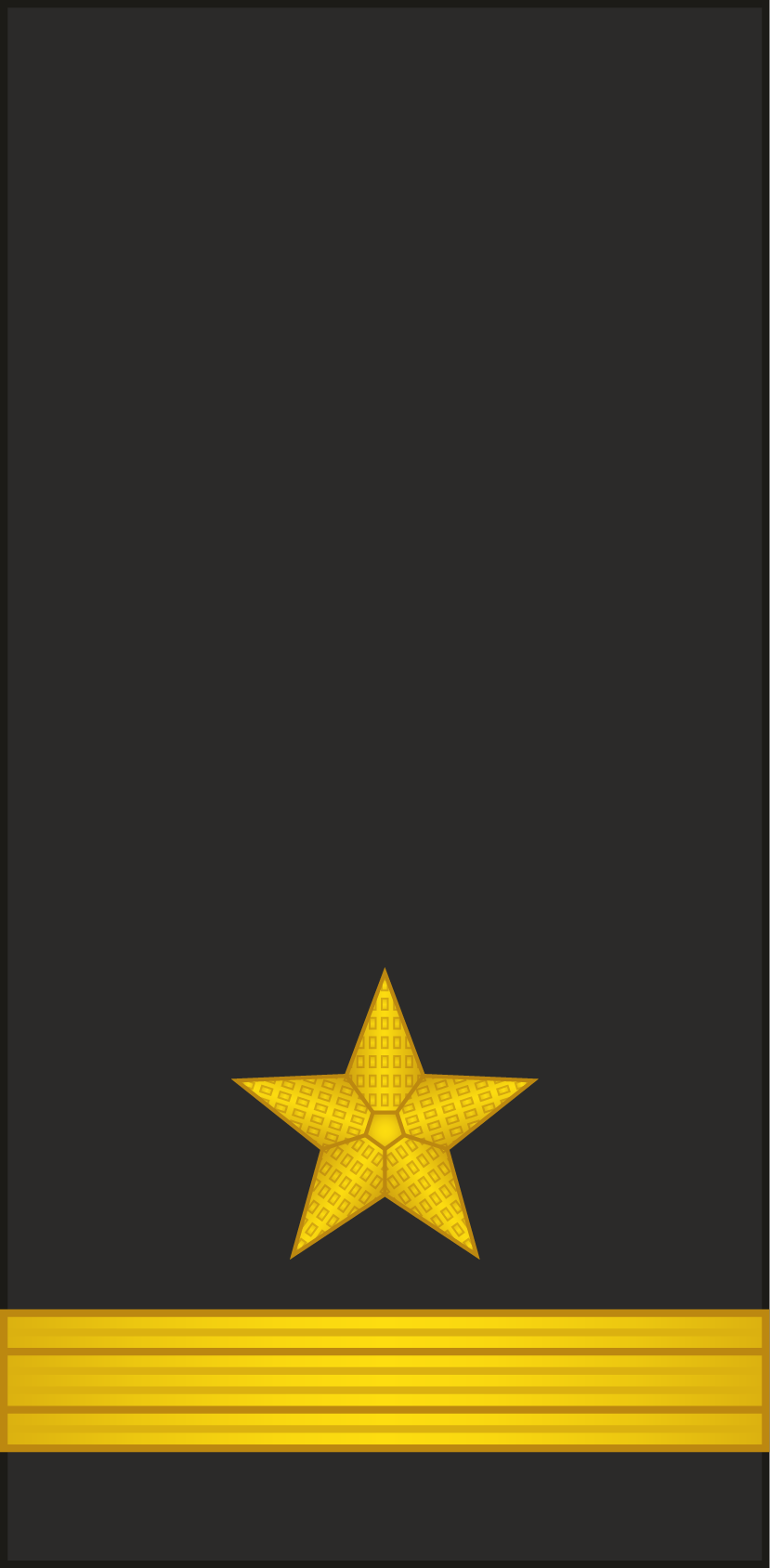
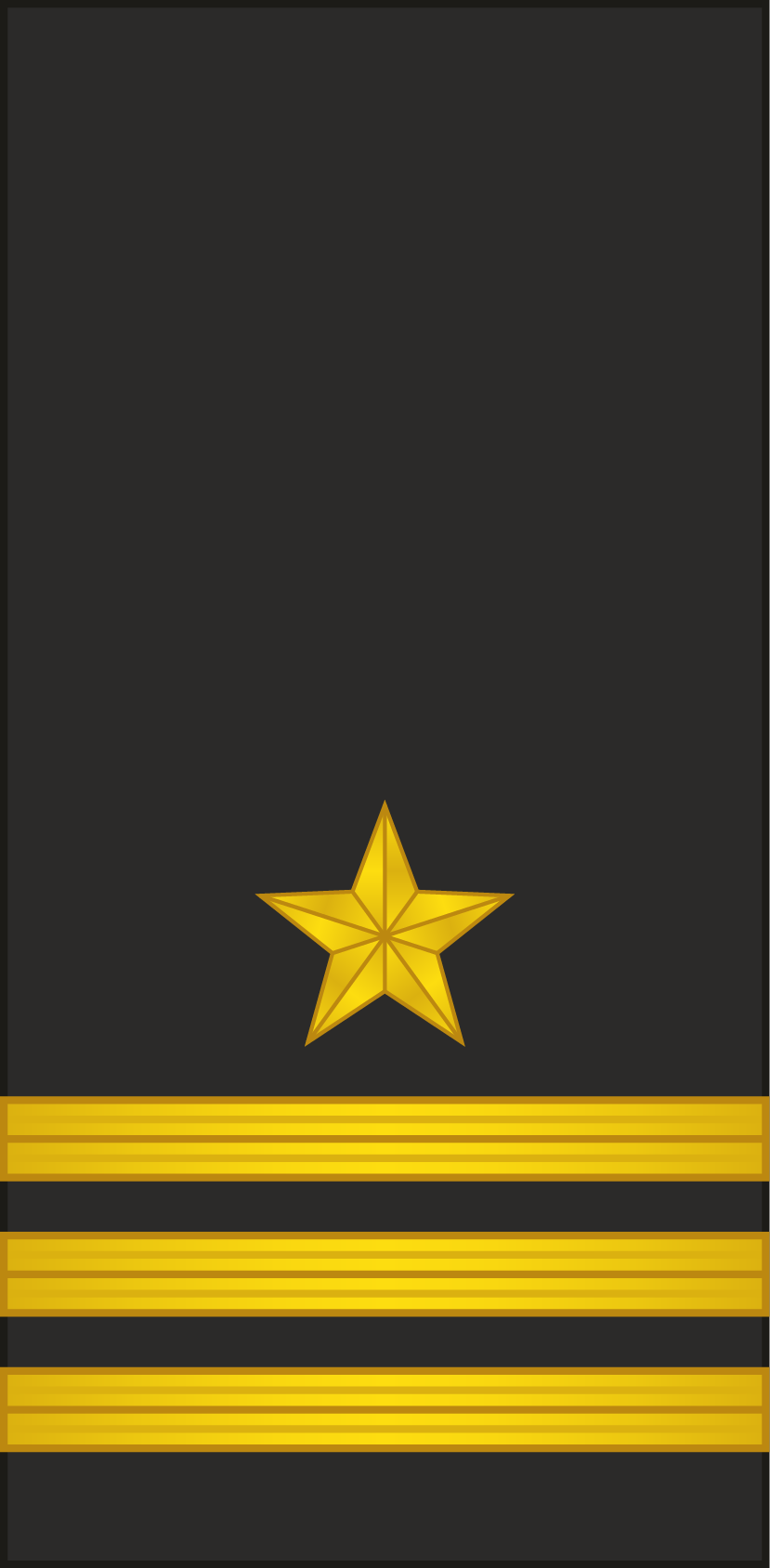
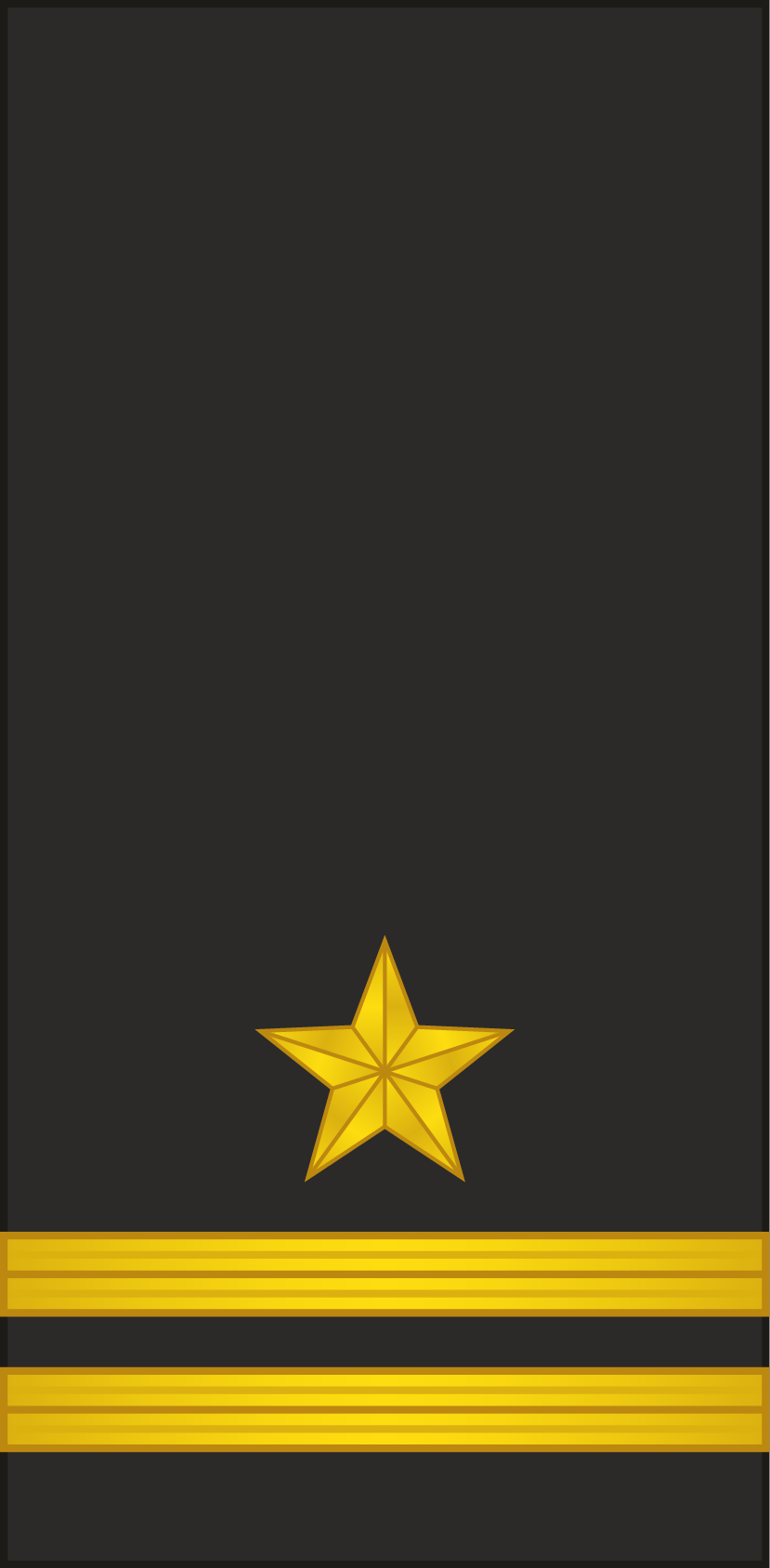
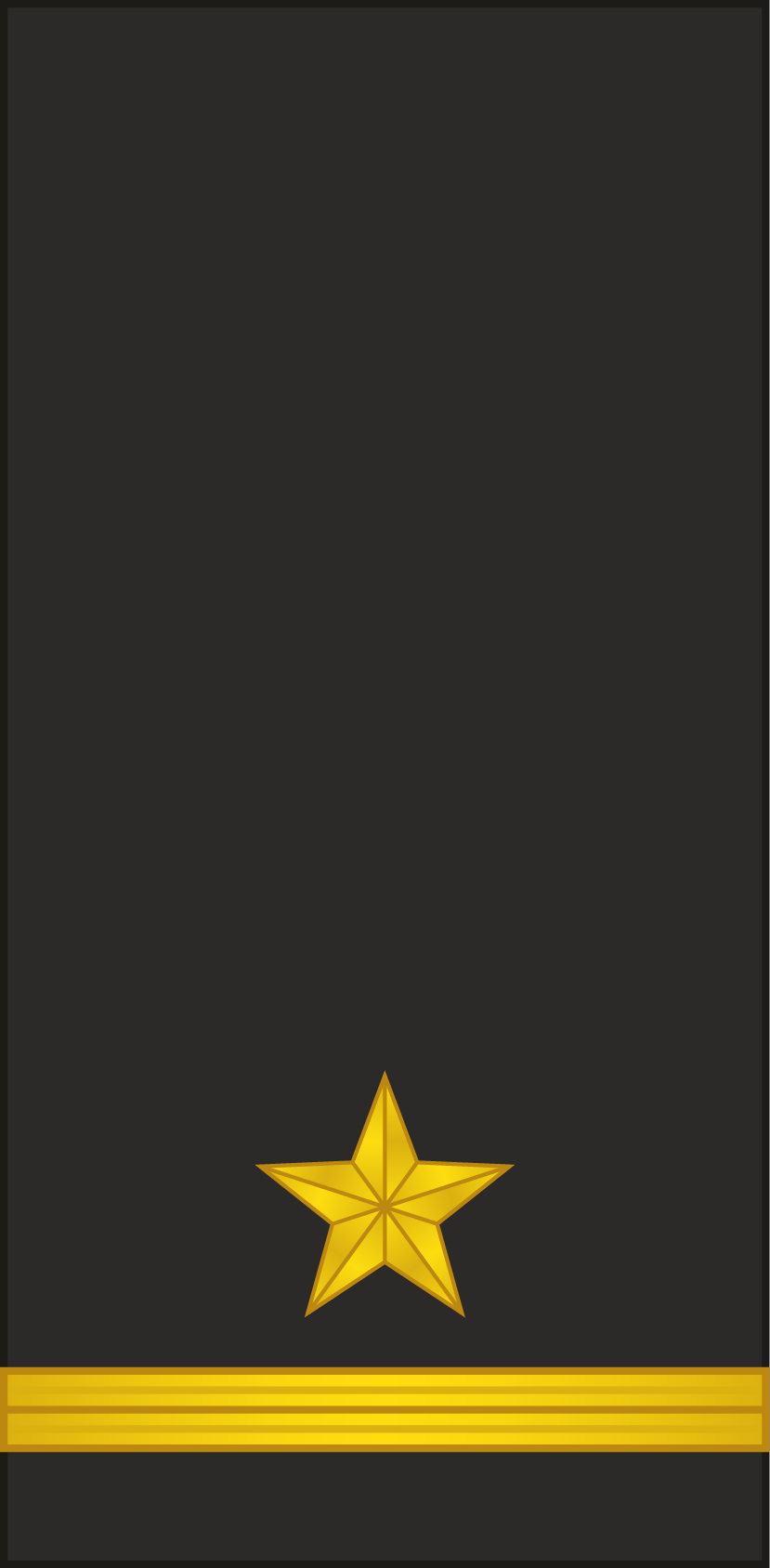
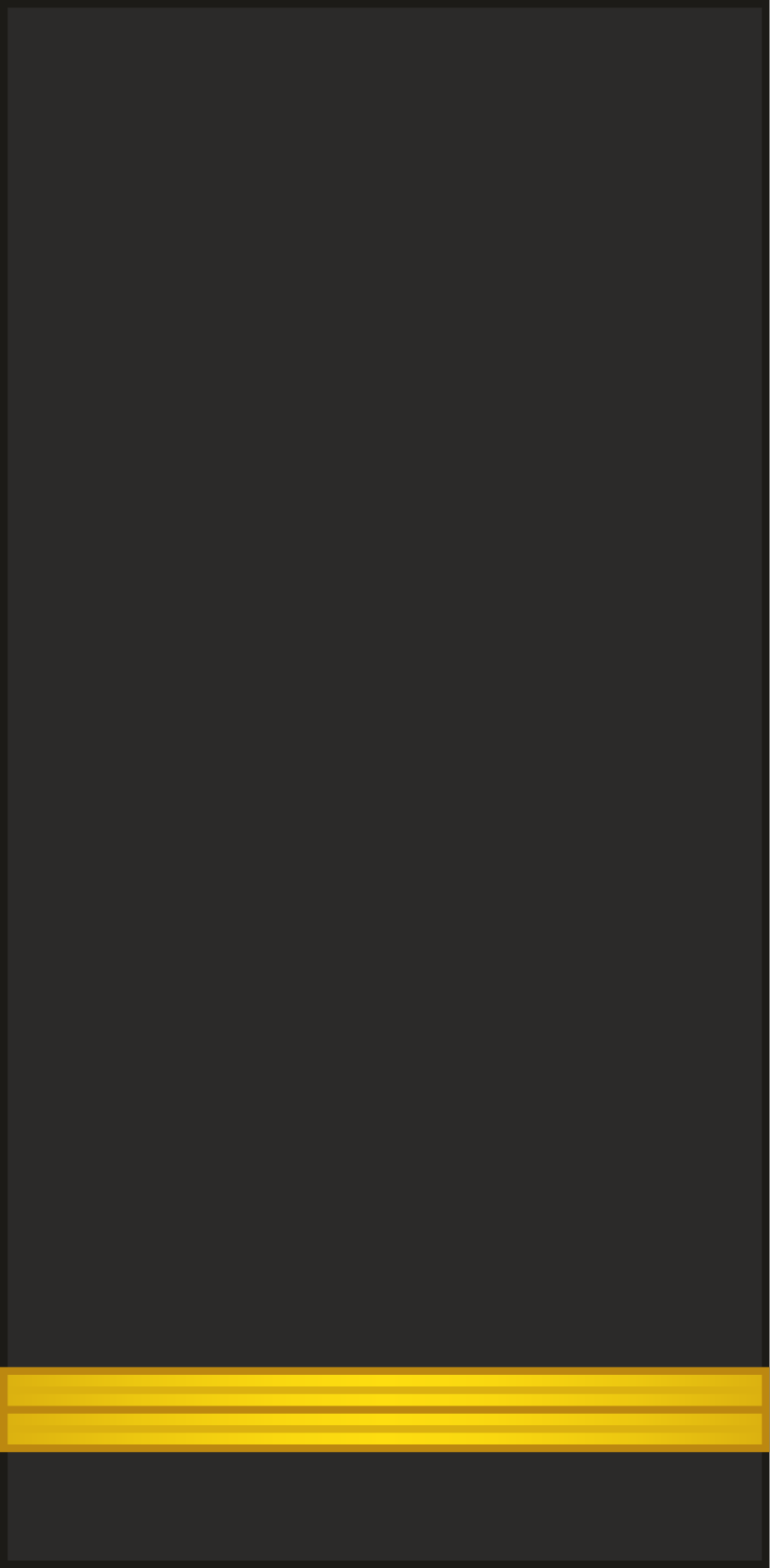
Title	海军上将 Hǎijūn shang jiang	海军中将 Hǎijūn zhong jiang	海军少将 Hǎijūn shao jiang	海军大校 Hǎijūn da xiao	海军上校 Hǎijūn shang xiao	海军中校 Hǎijūn zhong xiao	海军少校 Hǎijūn shao xiao	海军上尉 Hǎijūn shang wei	海军中尉 Hǎijūn zhong wei	海军少尉 Hǎijūn shao wei	海军学员 Hǎijūn xue yuan
Equivalent translation	Admiral	Vice admiral	Rear admiral	Senior captain	Captain	Commander	Lieutenant commander	Lieutenant	Lieutenant (junior grade)	Ensign	Officer cadet
Shoulder insignia
Collar insignia
Sleeve insignia

=== Enlisted and non-commissioned rates ===
The current system of enlisted ratings and their corresponding insignia dates from 2009.

Unlike NATO countries, new recruits of the People's Liberation Army have no military ranks before the boot camp is completed, and they will be awarded the rank of Private/Seaman Apprentice/Airman (all collectively called "Private" or "Lie Bing" in the Chinese language) after they have graduated from the boot camp. According to Article 16 of Chapter 3 of the "Regulations on the Service of Active Soldiers of the Chinese People's Liberation Army" (Chinese: 中国人民解放军现役士兵服役条例), "The lowest enlisted rank is Private".

In 2022, the translation for Chief petty officer went from 海军四级军士长 to 海军一级上士, while the translation for petty officer 1st class was changed from 海军上士 to 海军二级上士

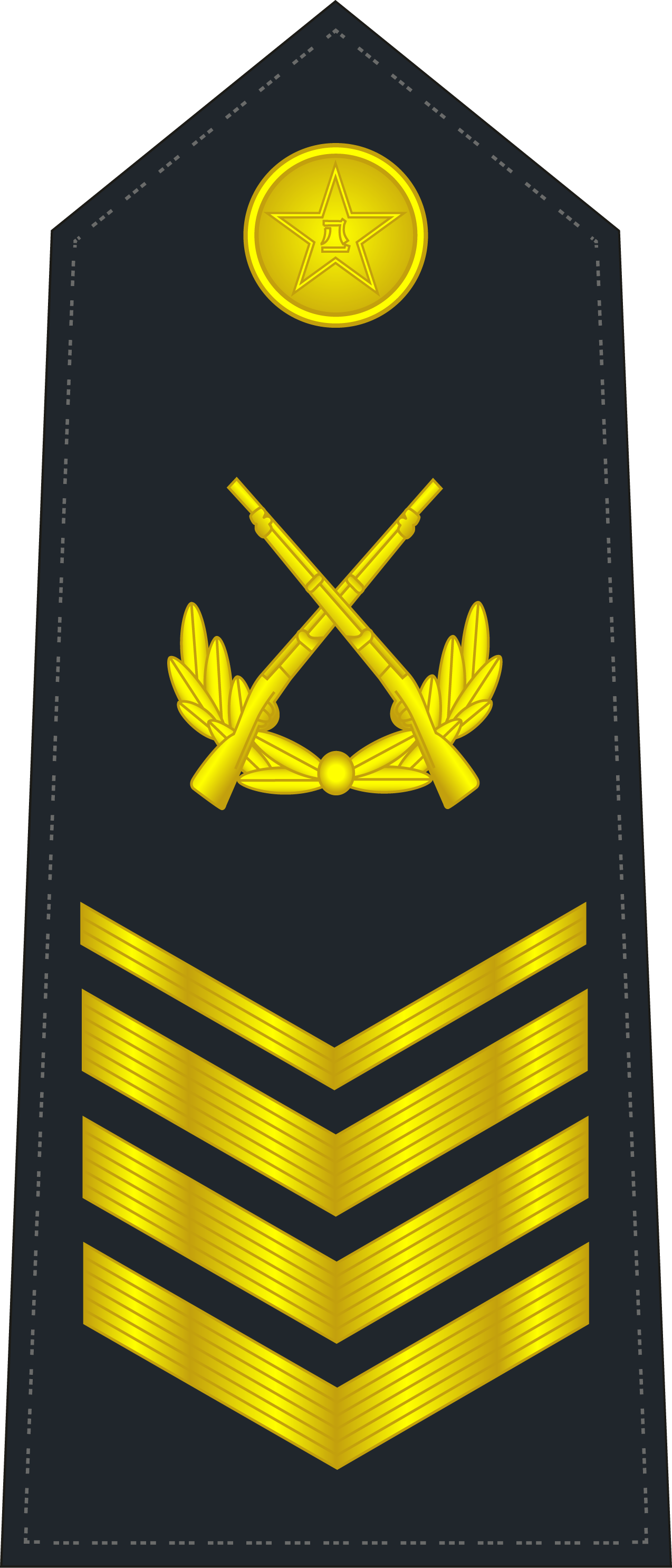
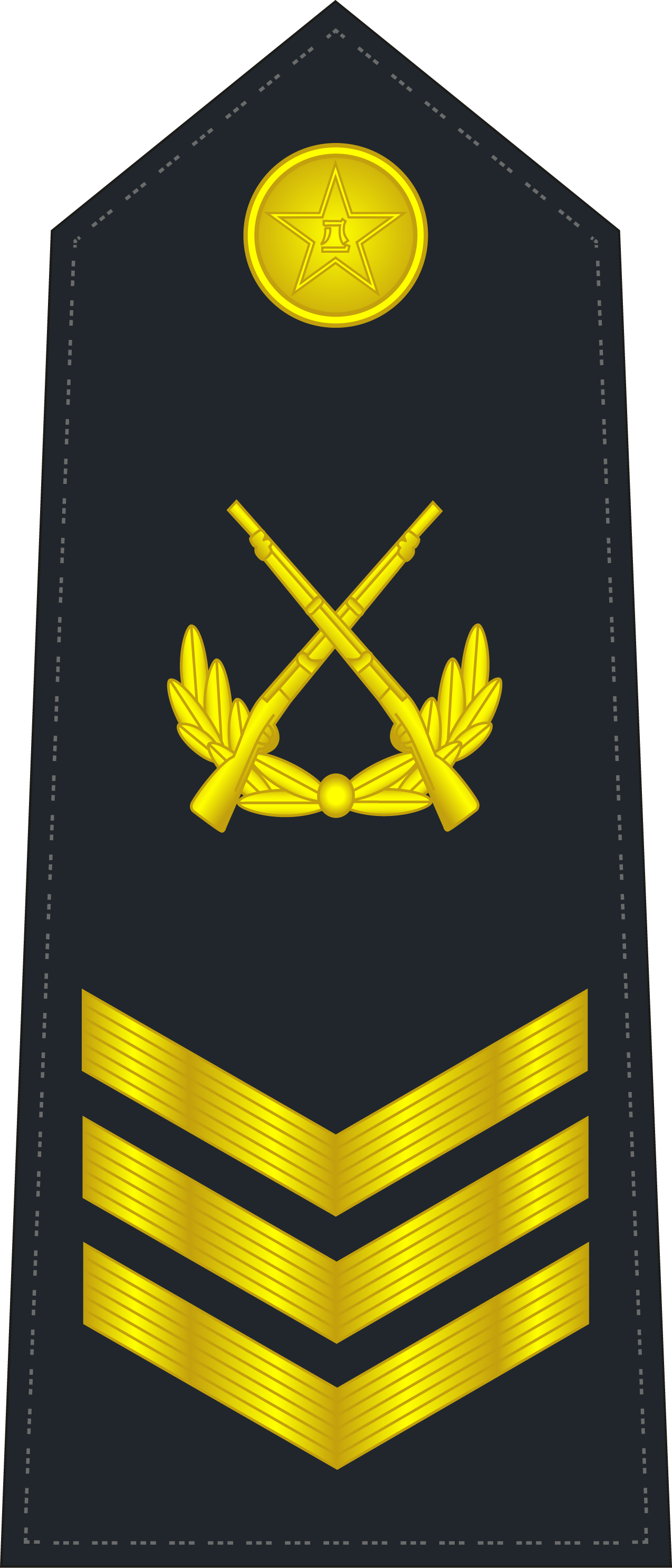
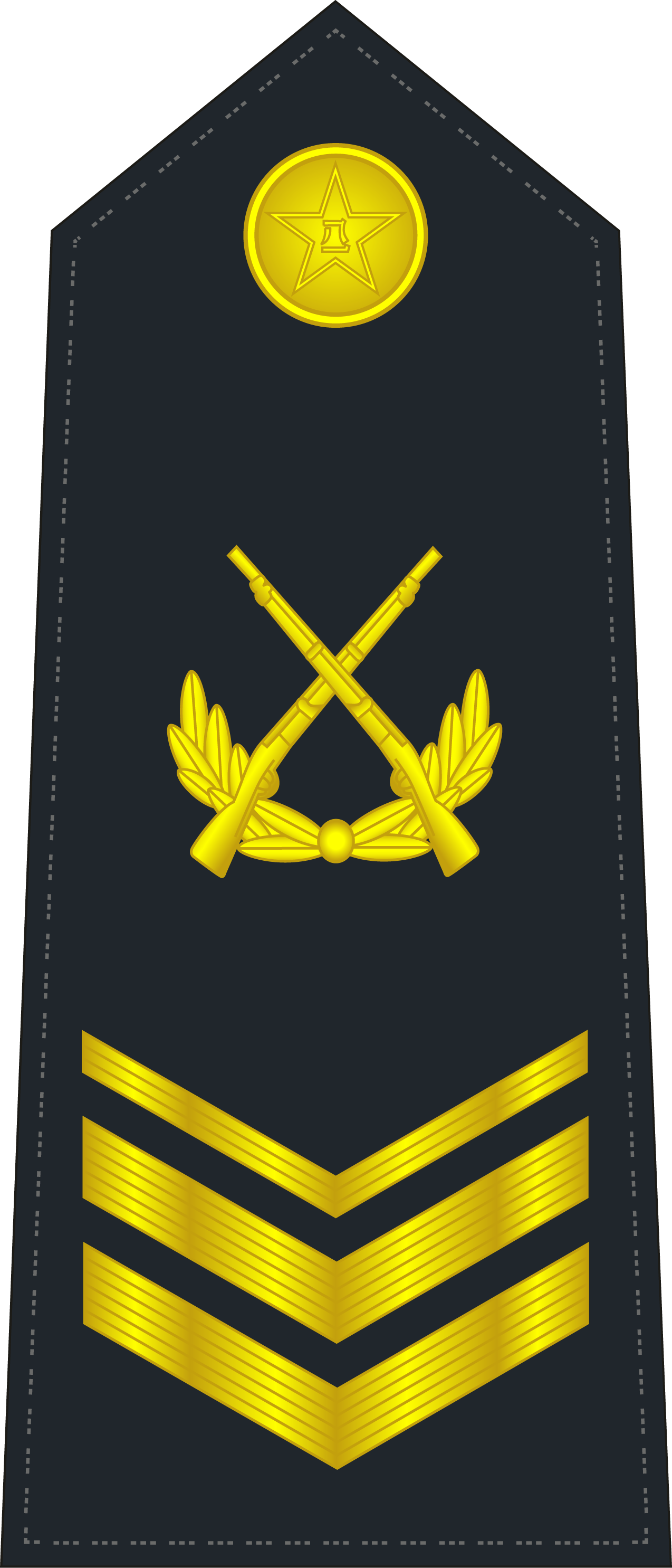
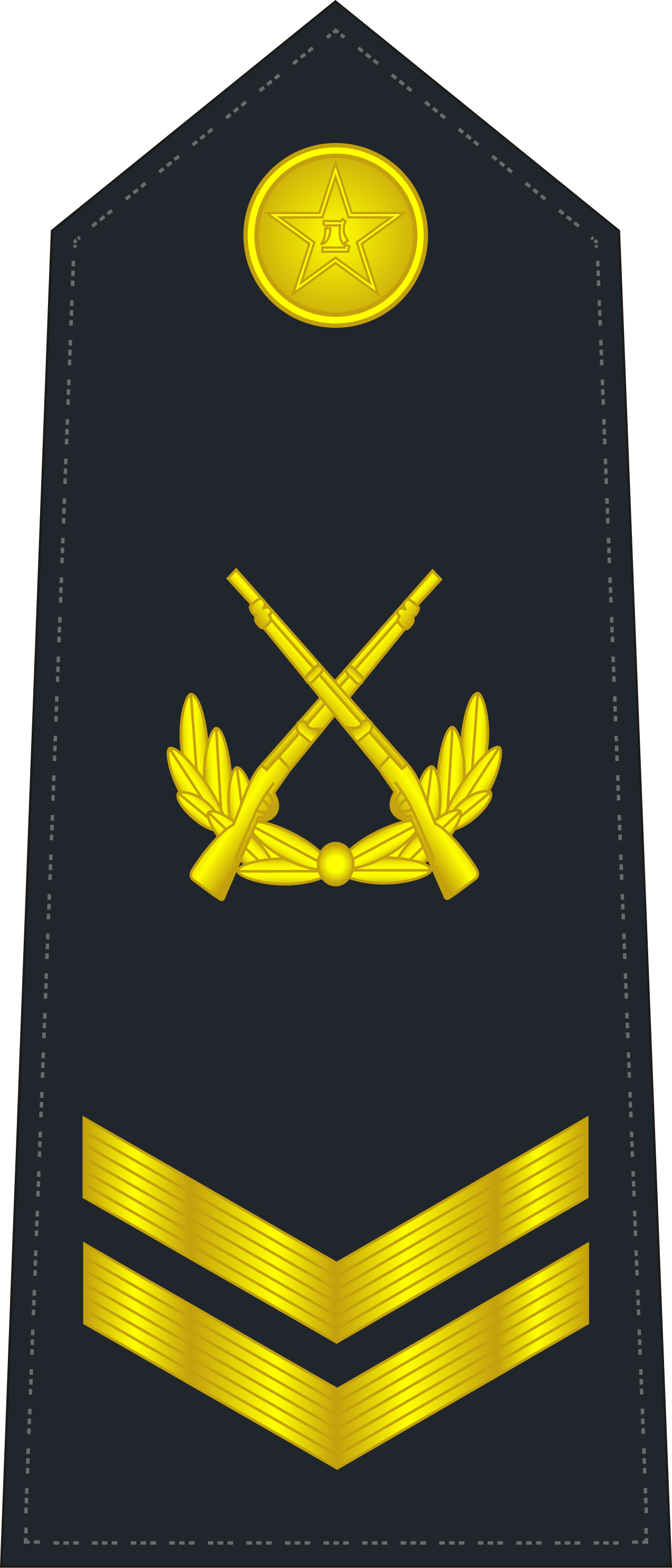
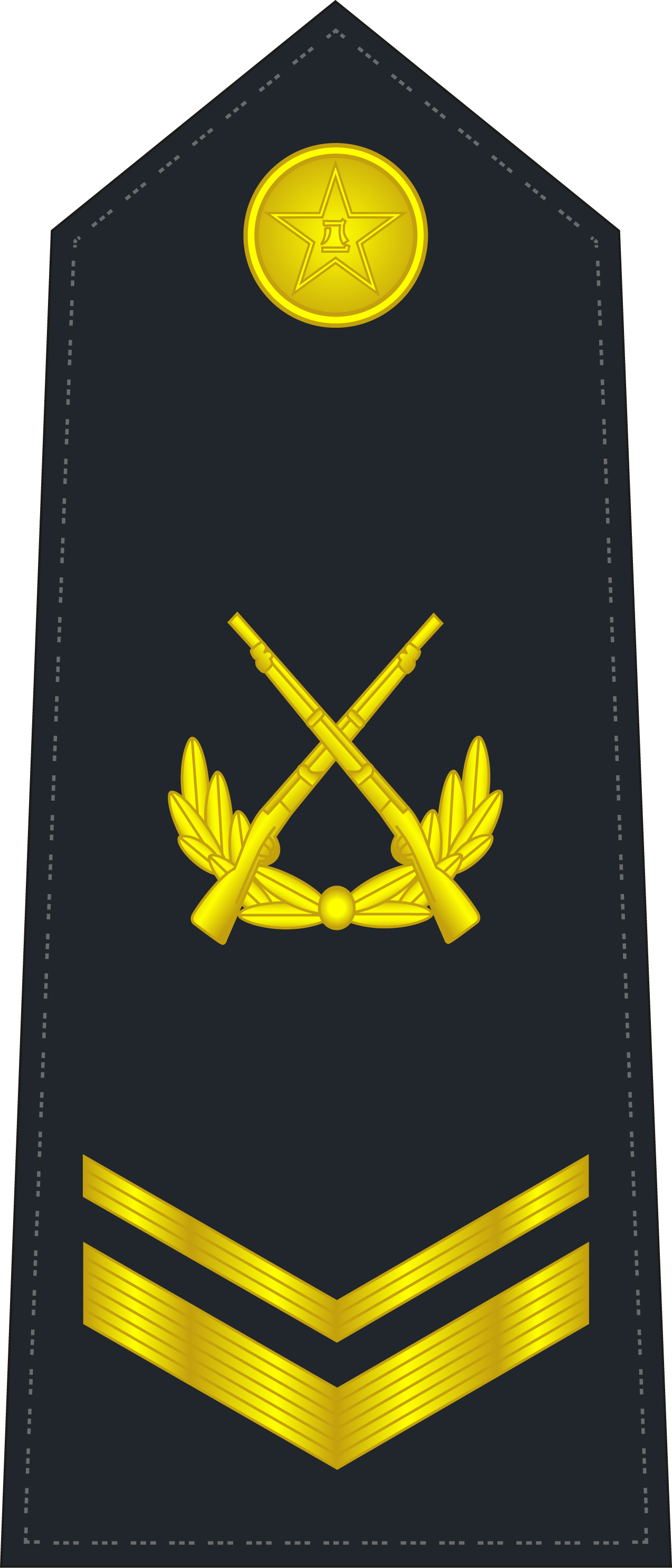
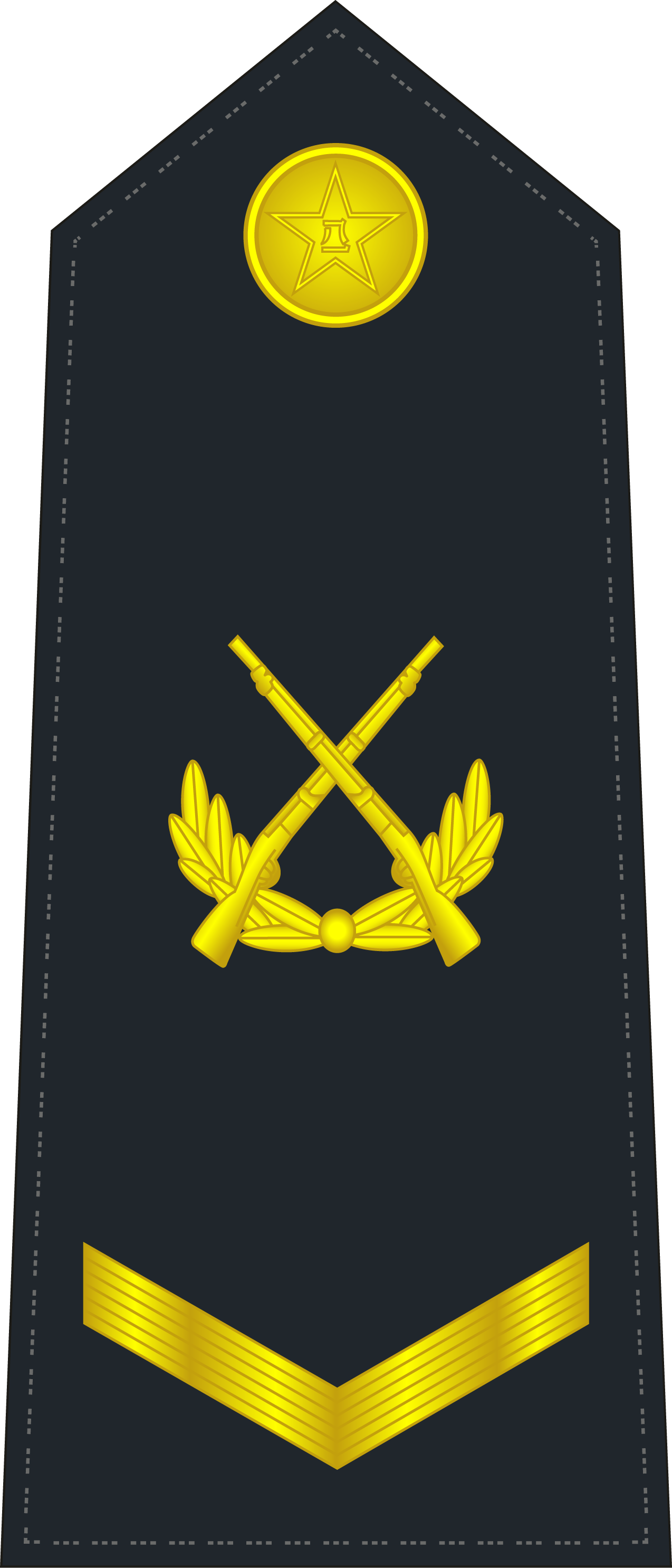
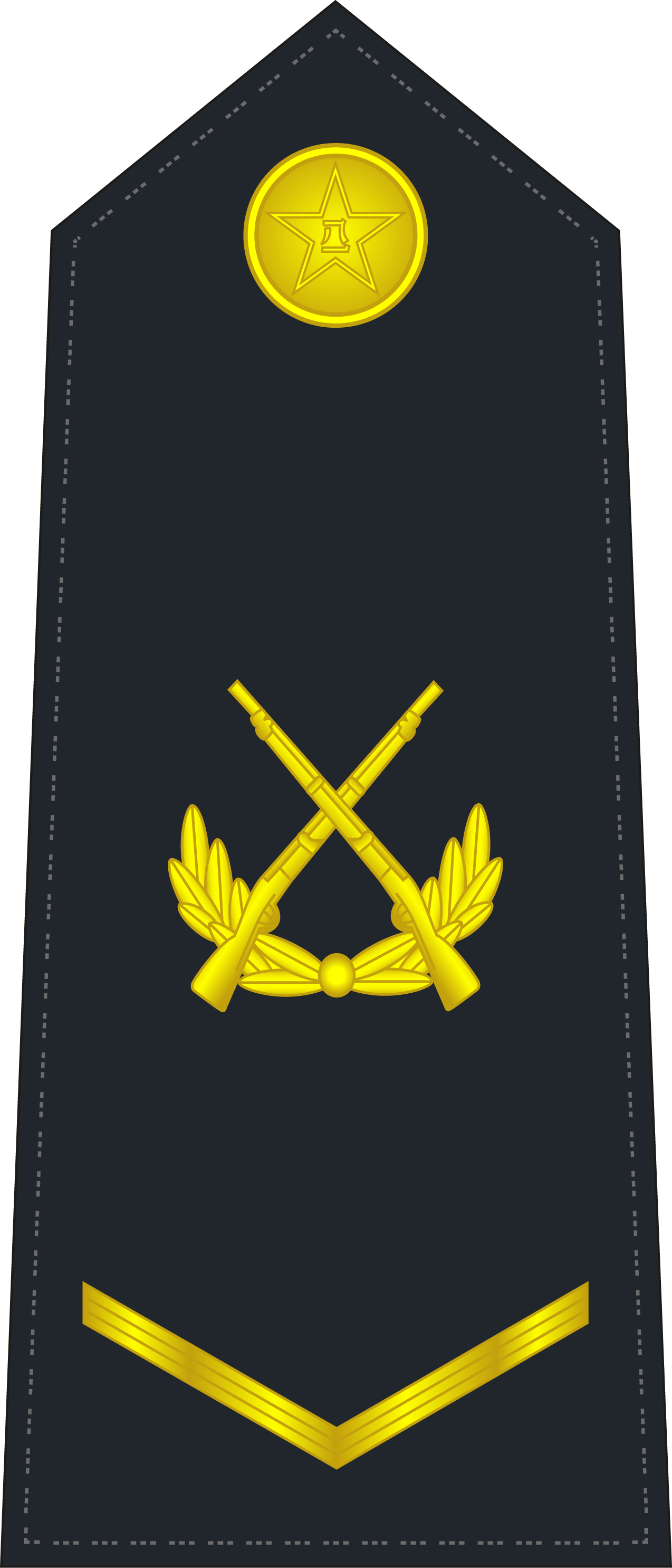
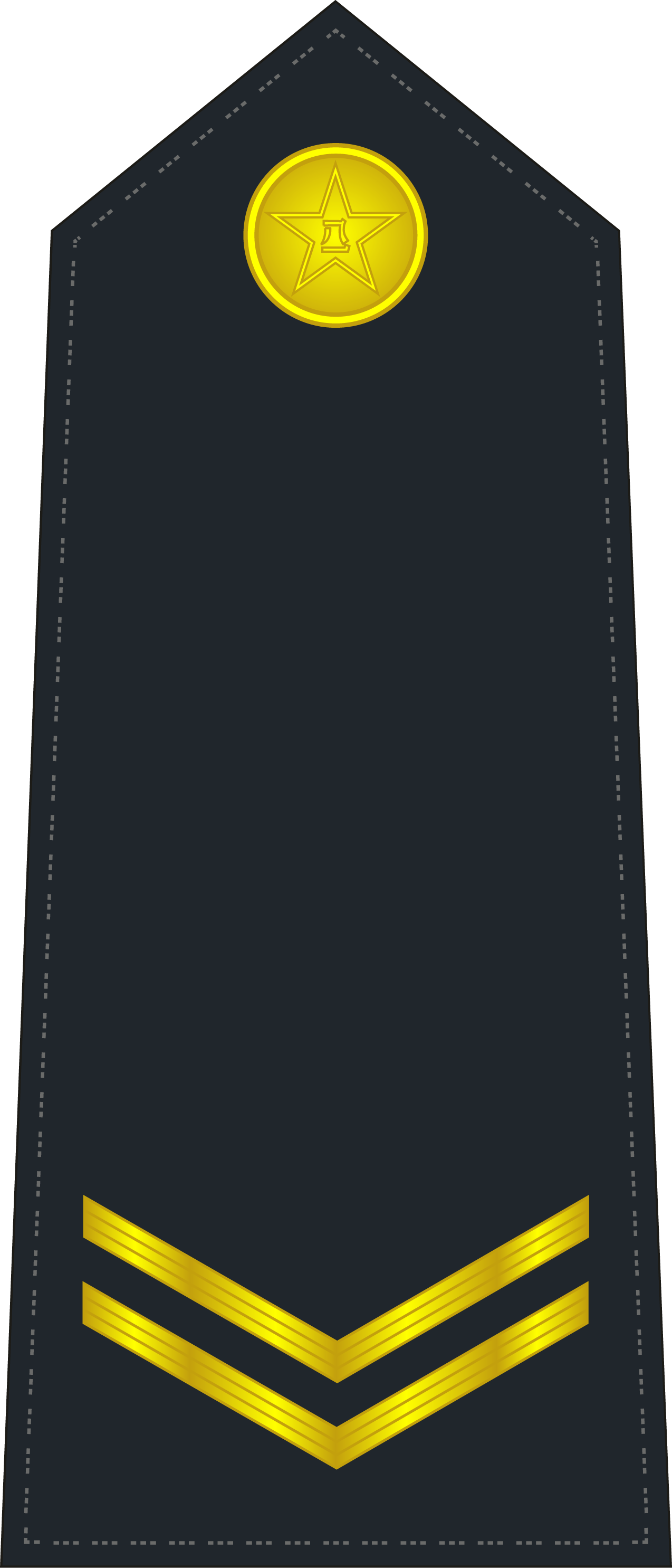
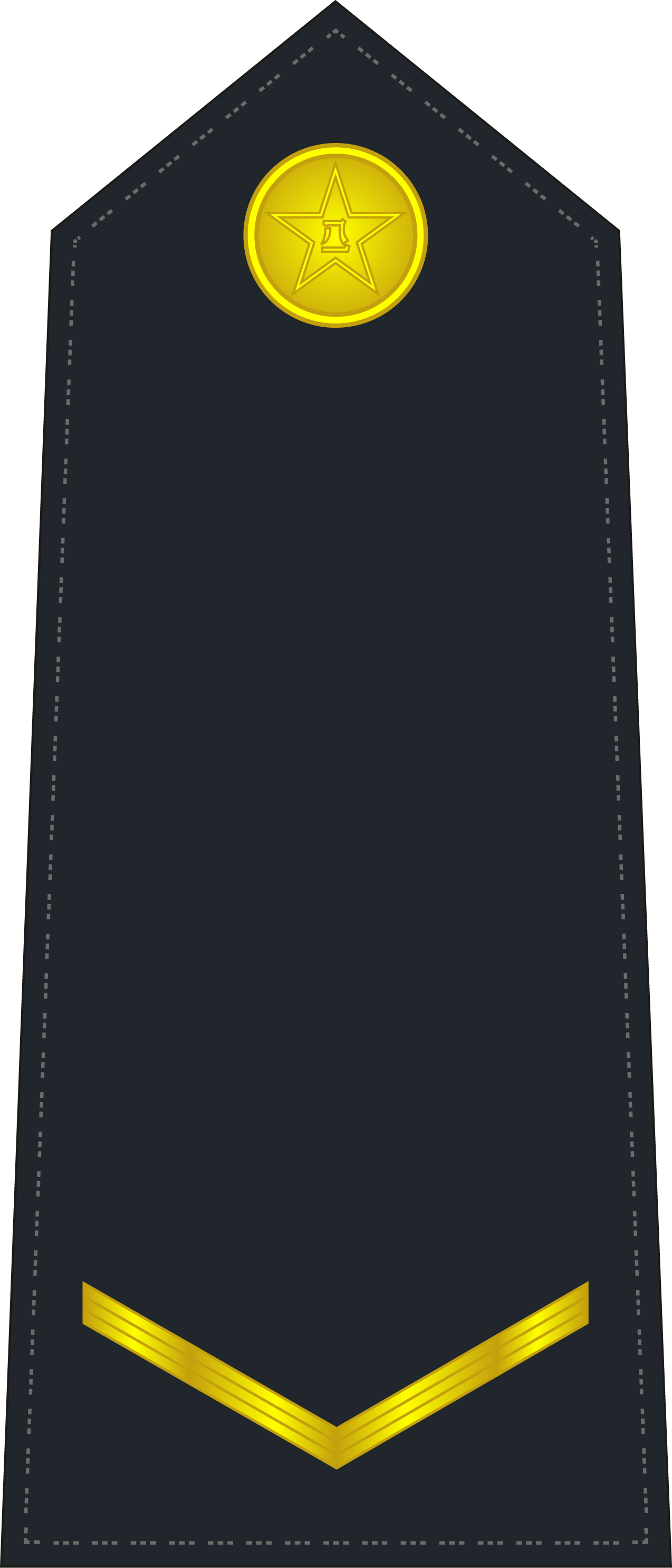
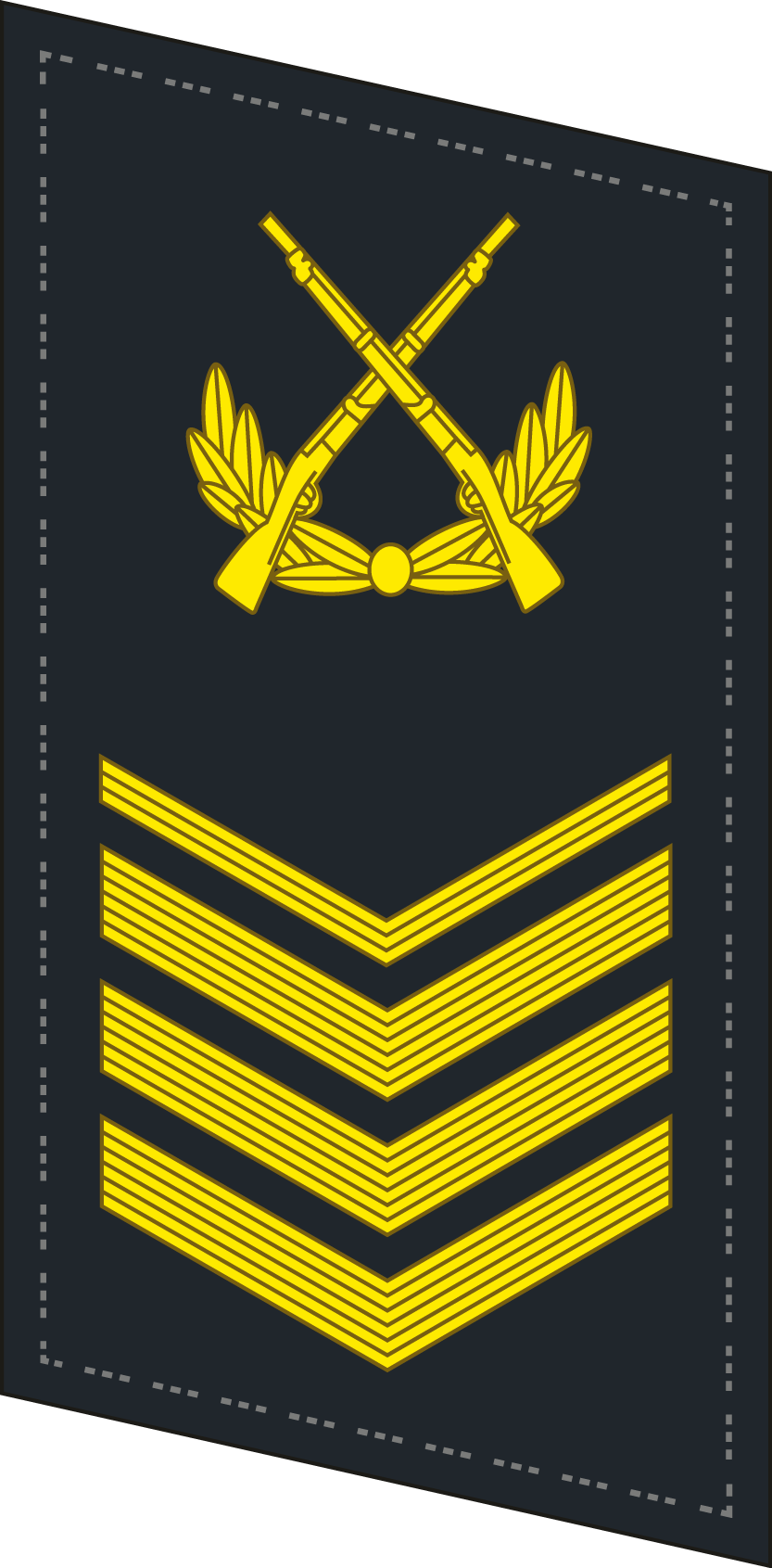
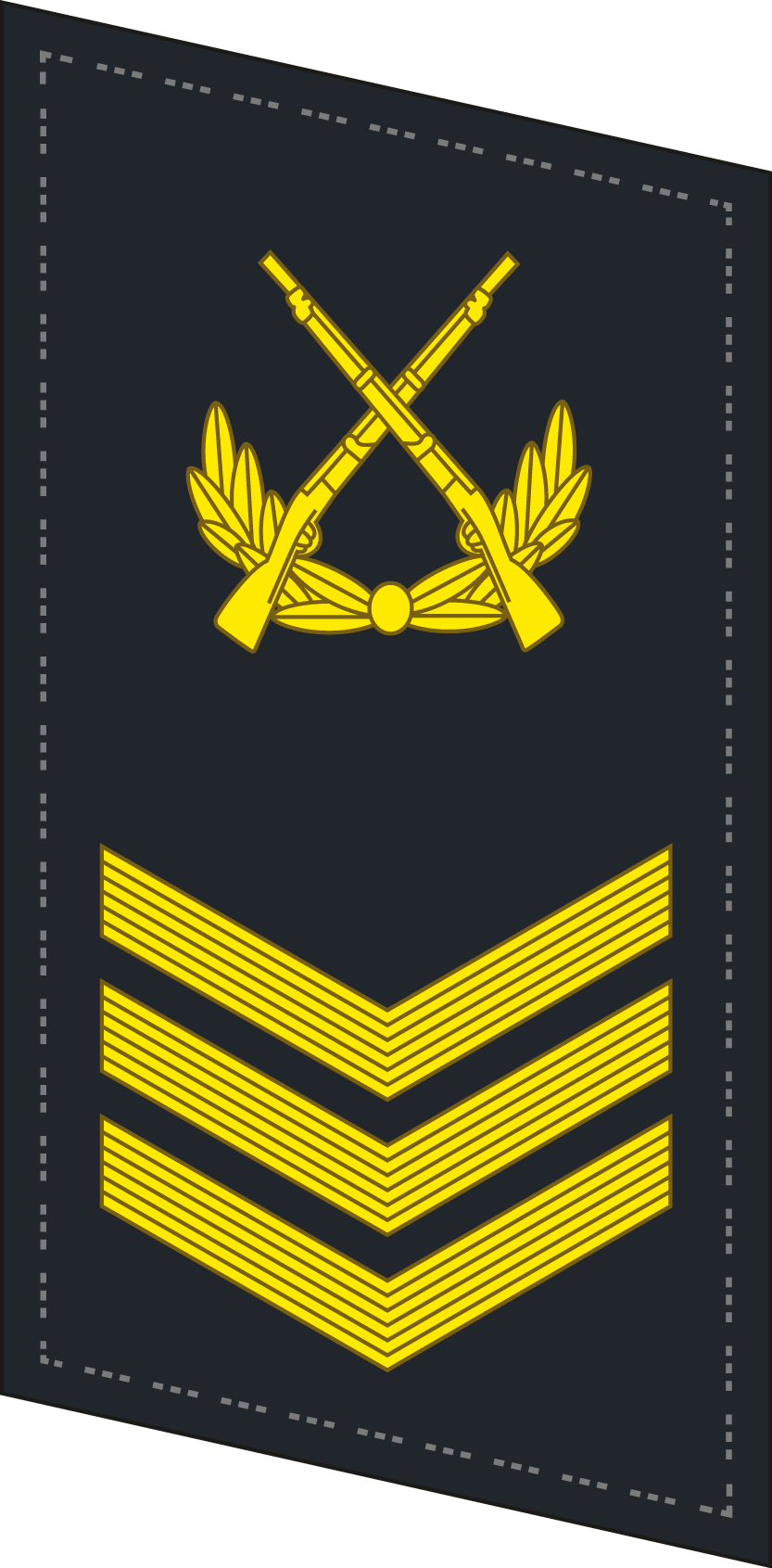
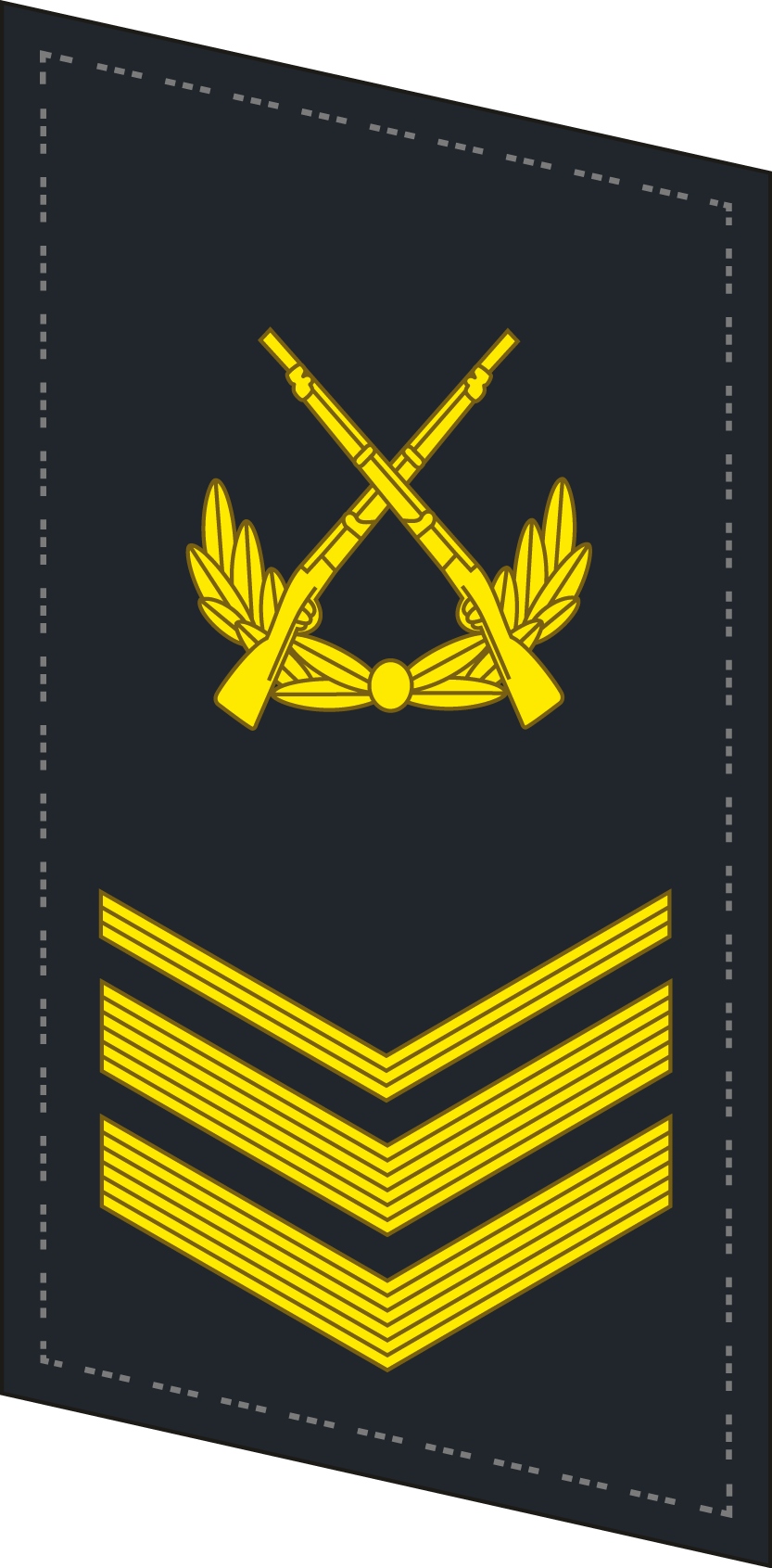
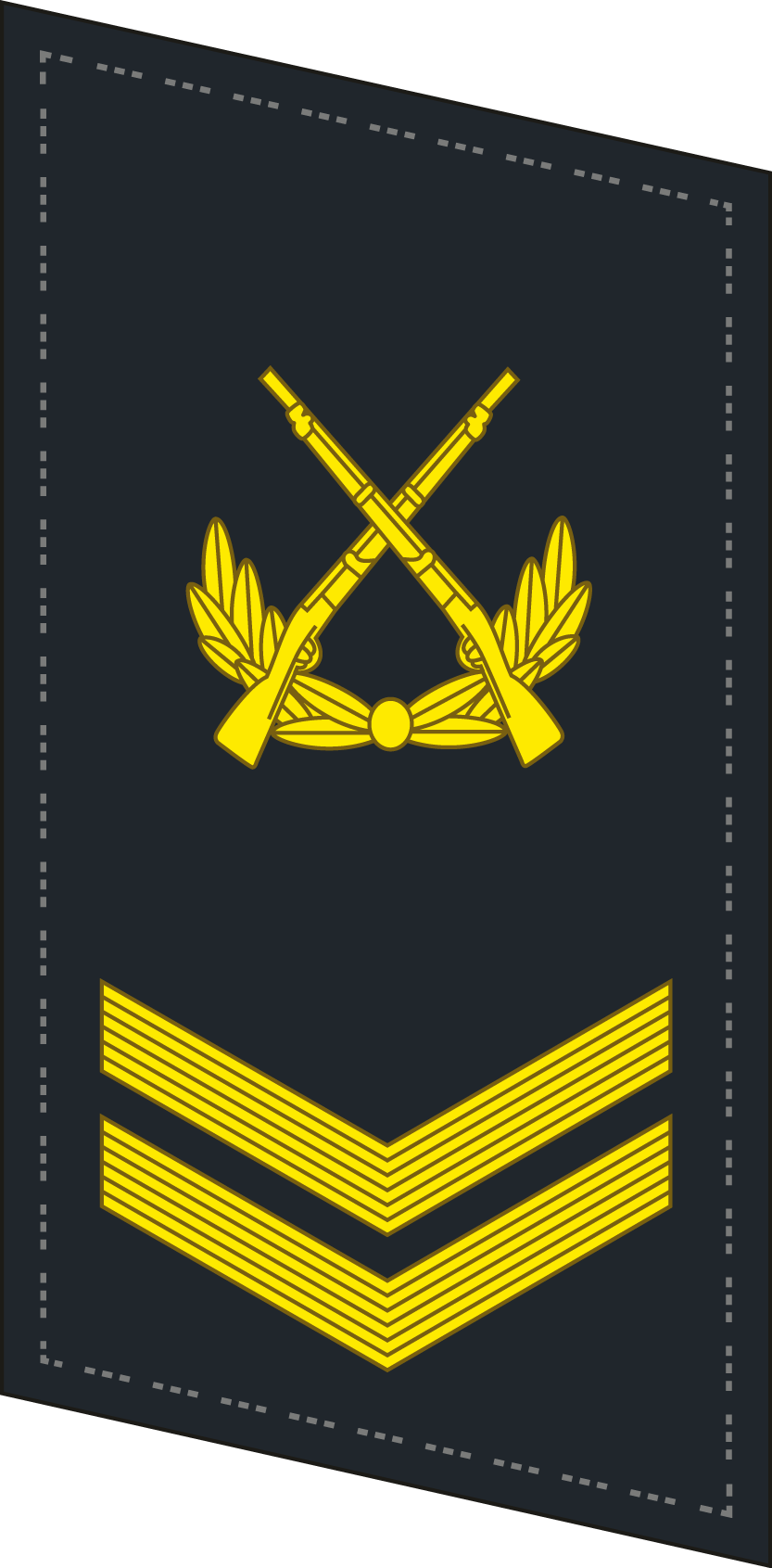
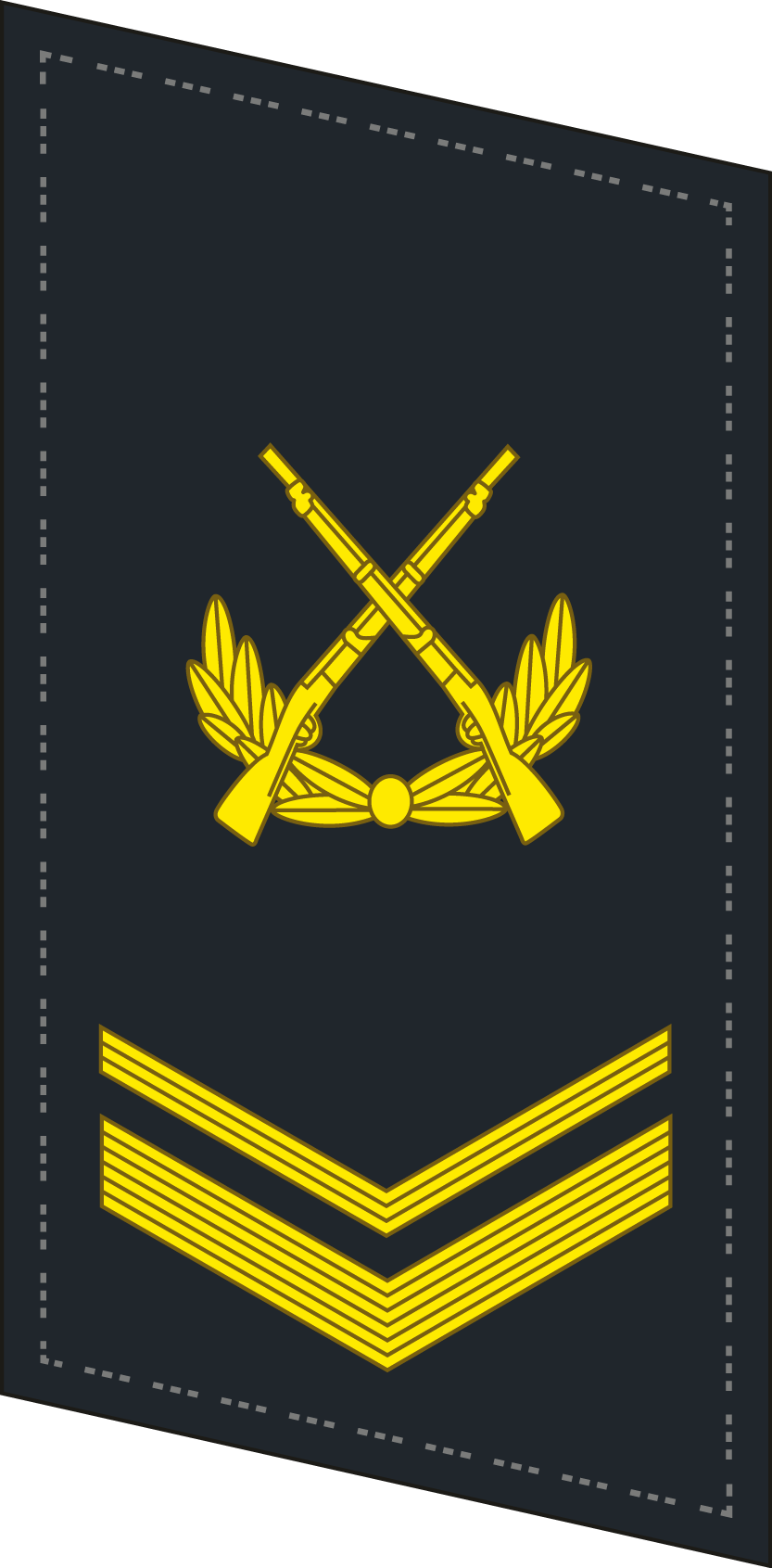
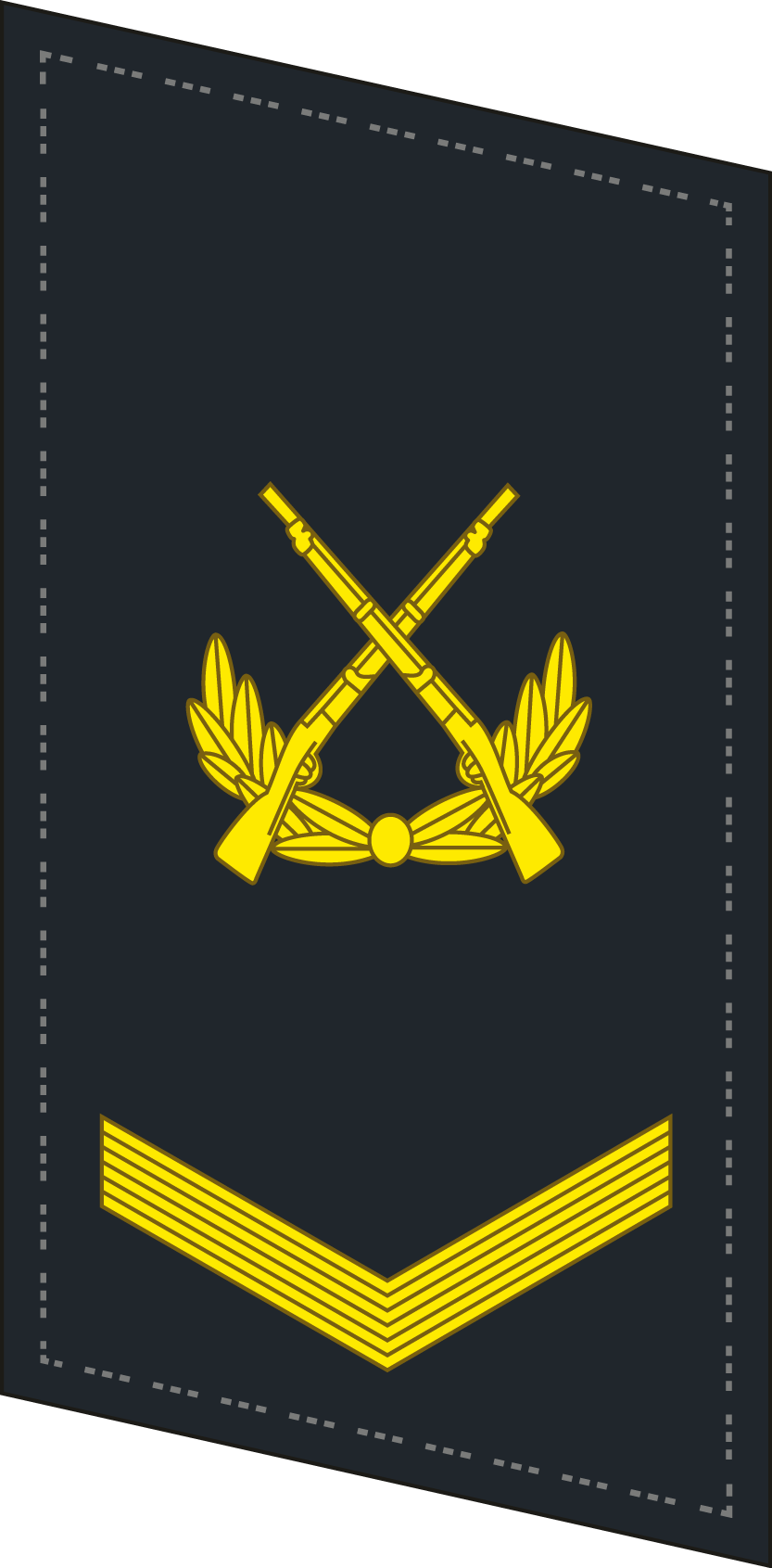
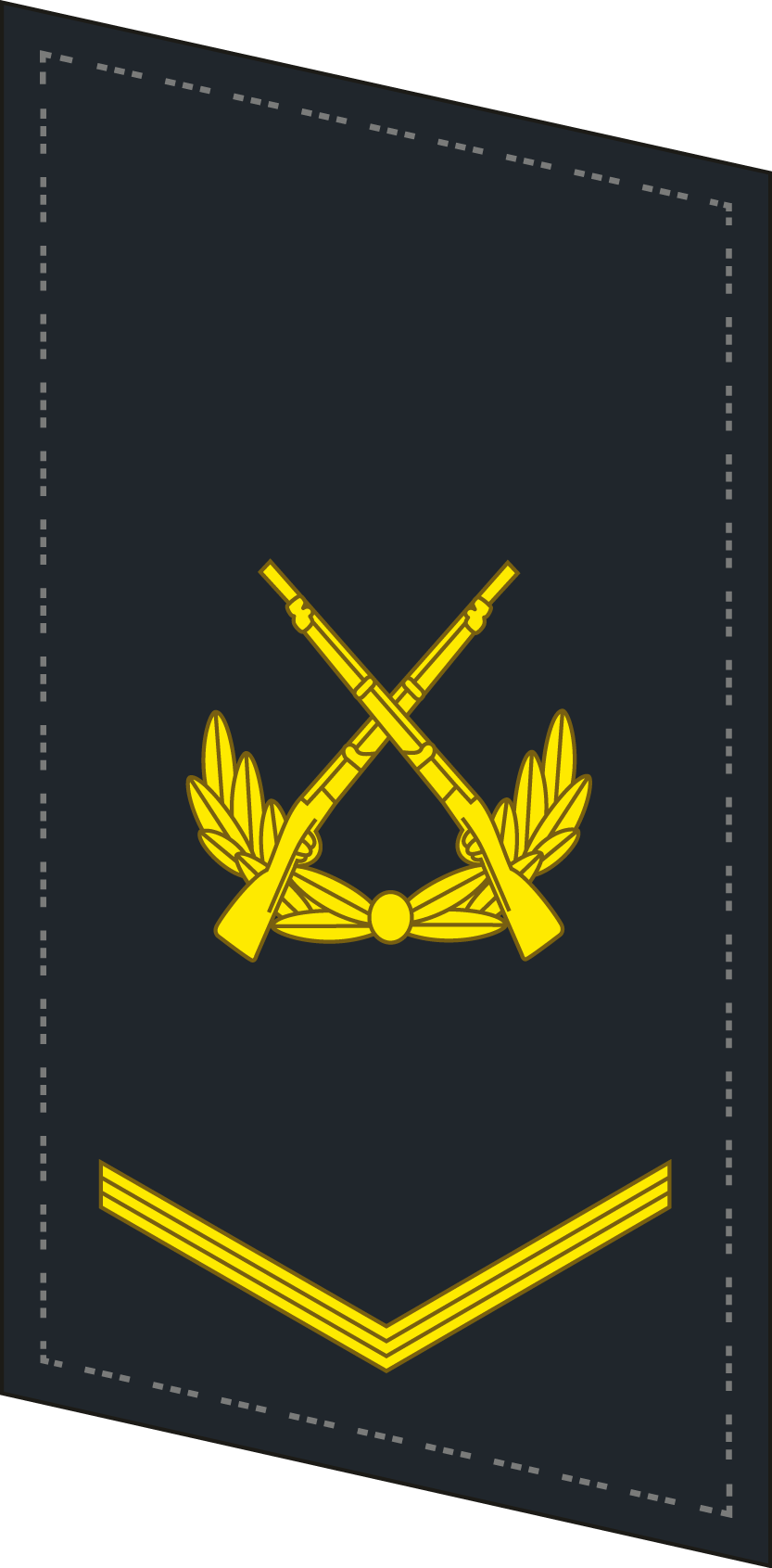
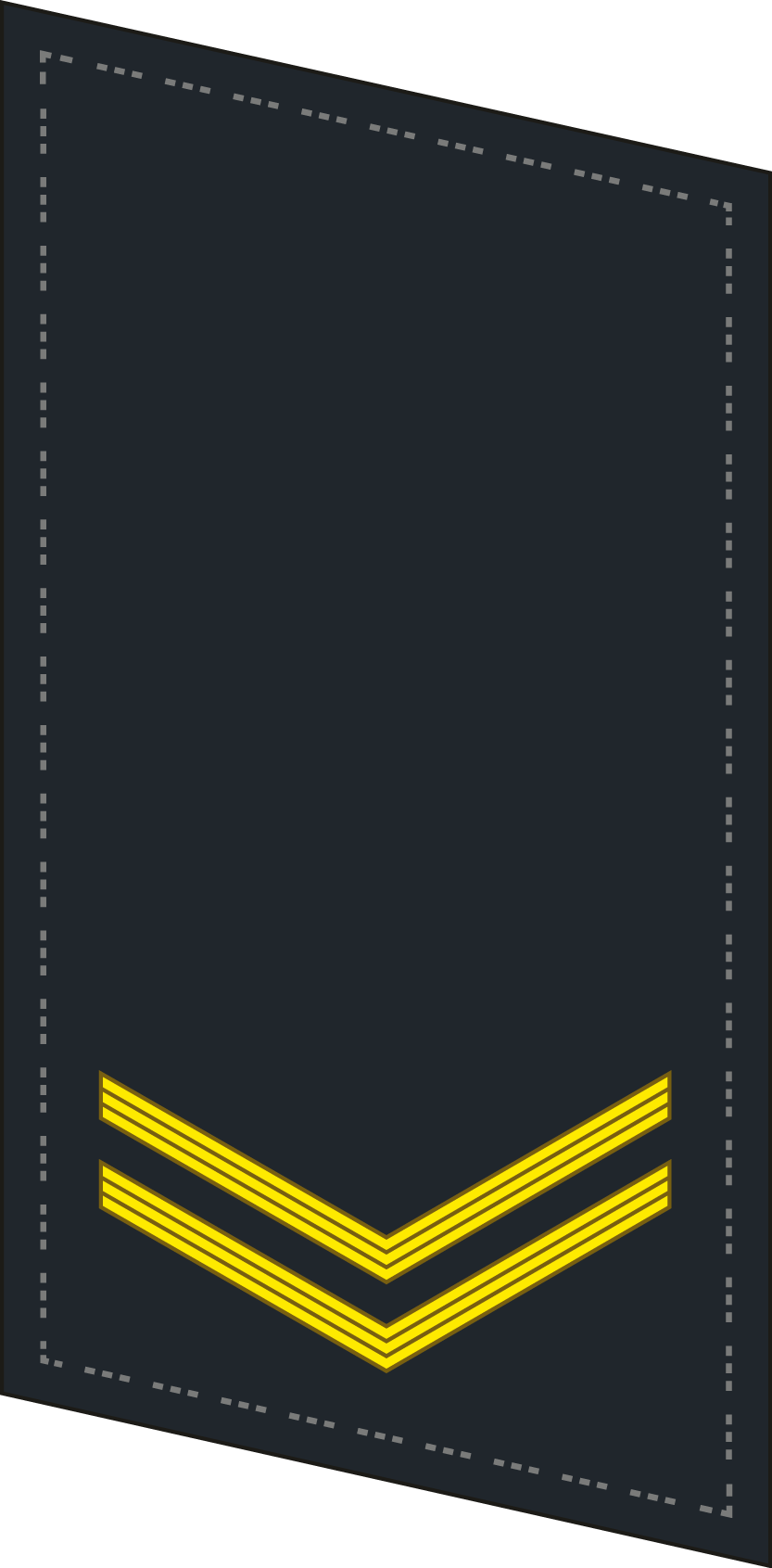
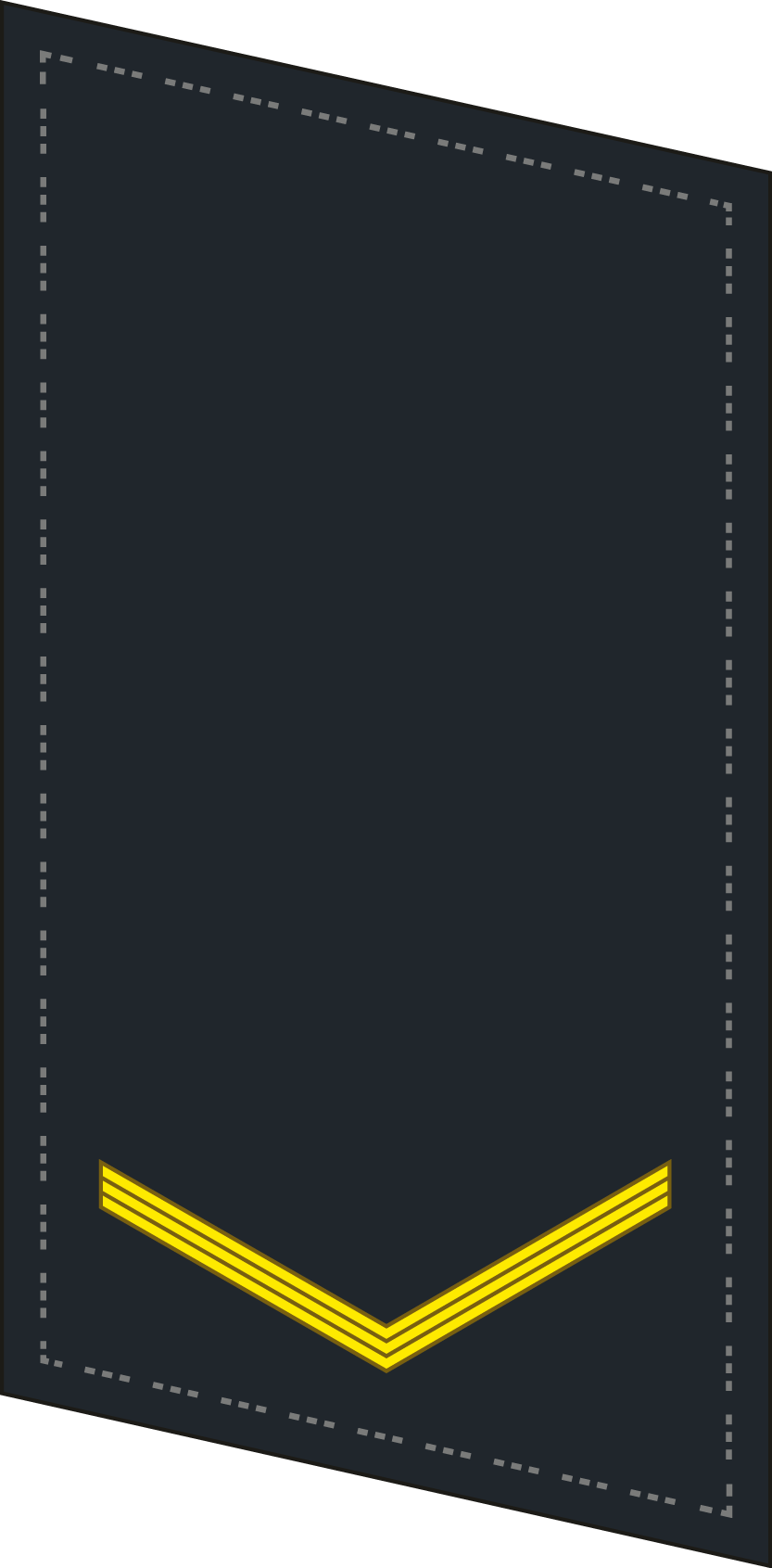
Title (Pre-2022)	海军一级军士长 Hǎijūn yi ji jun shi zhang	海军二级军士长 Hǎijūn er ji jun shi zhang	海军三级军士长 Hǎijūn san ji jun shi zhang	海军四级军士长 Hǎijūn si ji jun shi zhang	海军上士 Hǎijūn shang shi	海军中士 Hǎijūn zhong shi	海军下士 Hǎijūn xia shi	海军上等兵 Hǎijūn shang deng bing	海军列兵 Hǎijūn lie bing
Title (Post-2022)	海军一级军士长 Hǎijūn yi ji jun shi zhang	海军二级军士长 Hǎijūn er ji jun shi zhang	海军三级军士长 Hǎijūn san ji jun shi zhang	海军一级上士 Hǎijūn yī jí shàng shì	海军二级上士 Hǎijūn èr jí shàng shì	海军中士 Hǎijūn zhong shi	海军下士 Hǎijūn xia shi	海军上等兵 Hǎijūn shang deng bing	海军列兵 Hǎijūn lie bing
Equivalent translation	Command master chief petty officer	Master chief petty officer	Senior chief petty officer	Chief petty officer	Petty officer first class	Petty officer second class	Petty officer third class	Seaman	Seaman apprentice
Shoulder insignia
Collar insignia

== Historical ranks ==
=== Type 55 (Line corps) ===
==== Officers ====
Rank group	General / flag officers				Senior officers				Junior officers
People's Liberation Army Navy
People's Liberation Army Navy	海军大将; Hǎijūn dàjiàng	海军上将; Hǎijūn shàngjiàng	海军中将; Hǎijūn zhōngjiàng	海军少将; Hǎijūn shàojiàng	海军大校; Hǎijūn dàxiào	海军上校; Hǎijūn shàngxiào	海军中校; Hǎijūn zhōngxiào	海军少校; Hǎijūn shàoxiào	海军大尉; Hǎijūn dàwèi	海军上尉; Hǎijūn shàngwèi	海军中尉; Hǎijūn zhōngwèi	海军少尉; Hǎijūn shàowèi	海军学员; Hǎijūn xuéyuán

==== Enlisted and non-commissioned rates ====
Rank group	Senior NCOs		Junior NCOs	Enlisted
People's Liberation Army Navy
People's Liberation Army Navy	海军上士; Hǎijūn shàngshì	海军中士; Hǎijūn zhōngshì	海军下士; Hǎijūn xiàshì	海军上等兵; Hǎijūn shàngděngbīng	海军列兵; Hǎijūn lièbīng
People's Liberation Army Navy	Petty officer 1st class	Petty officer 2nd class	Petty officer 3rd class	Seaman	Seaman apprentice

== See also ==
- Grades of the armed forces of China
- People's Liberation Army rank insignia
- Republic of China Armed Forces rank insignia
