= Academic institutions of the armed forces of China =

The academic institutions of the armed forces of China include the educational institutions of the People's Liberation Army (PLA) and the People's Armed Police (PAP). Throughout the history of the People's Republic of China, there have been many dramatic reforms to the military education system, closing, merging, reducing and reassigning institutions. The 2017 reforms saw another massive change, as they reduced the number of PLA academic institutions from 67 to 37.

These institutions carry out training for all branches and arms of the PLA and PAP, from officer training to logistics, to technology, to NCO training. The changes in the structure of the system have not stopped. In January 2018, the Coast Guard Academy (海警学院) joined the PAP institution system.

The military program in civilian universities (equivalent to ROTC programs) is in flux and it is not clear what shape it will take in the near future, as of 2023.

== Existing military academies ==
The official English names are used where available. There is a significant amount of inconsistency in the translation of the Chinese terms 大学, 学院, and 学校, which should normally be "University", "Academy" and "School" respectively, but 学院 will sometimes be found as "College", "Academy", "Institute", or "University", and "大学" sometimes as "College". Other translations will also be found on occasion.

This table only lists military academic institutions (included in the military order of battle), and does not include non-military colleges and universities affiliated with the army or military factories (not included in the PLA's order of battle), such as Changsha Aeronautical Vocational and Technical College, the Chinese People's Liberation Army 4808 Factory Vocational and Technical School, etc.

=== Institutions directly under the Central Military Commission ===
#	Institution Name	Founded	Location	Branch	School website	Unit Grade	Remarks
1	National Defense University (中国人民解放军国防大学)	1927	Beijing	Central Military Commission	http://www.cdsndu.org/	Deputy Theater	Does not recruit gaokao students
2	National University of Defense Technology (国防科技大学)	1953	Changsha	Central Military Commission	http://www.nudt.edu.cn/	Corps	Project 985 . Recruits gaokao students.

=== Institutions affiliated with PLA branches ===
#	Institution Name	Founded	Location	Branch	Unit Grade	Remarks
1	Ground Force Command College (陆军指挥学院)	1952	Nanjing	Ground Force	Deputy Corps	
2	Army Engineering University of the PLA (陆军工程大学)	1973	Nanjing	Ground Force	Deputy Corps	Recruits gaokao students.
3	Army Infantry College of the PLA (陆军步兵学院)	1949	Nanchang	Ground Force	Deputy Corps	Recruits gaokao students.
4	Army Academy of Armored Forces (陆军装甲兵学院)	1950	Beijing	Ground Force	Deputy Corps	Recruits gaokao students.
5	PLA Army Academy of Artillery and Air Defense (陆军炮兵防空兵学院)	1977	Hefei	Ground Force	Deputy Corps	Recruits gaokao students.
6	Army Aviation Academy (陆军航空兵学院)	1999	Beijing	Ground Force	Deputy Corps	Junior officer training
7	Army Special Operations Academy (陆军特种作战学院)	1949	Guilin	Ground Force	Deputy Corps	Recruits gaokao students.
8	Army Academy of Border and Coastal Defence (陆军边海防学院)	1941	Xi'an	Ground Force	Deputy Corps	Recruits gaokao students.
9	Army Institute of NBC Defence (陆军防化学院)	1950	Beijing	Ground Force	Deputy Corps	Recruits gaokao students.
10	Army Medical University (陆军军医大学)	1954	Chongqing	Ground Force	Deputy Corps	Recruits gaokao students.
11	Army Logistics Academy (陆军勤务学院)	1961	Chongqing	Ground Force	Deputy Corps	Recruits gaokao students.
12	Army Military Transportation University (陆军军事交通学院)	1949	Tianjin	Ground Force	Deputy Corps	Recruits gaokao students. |-
13	Naval Command College (海军指挥学院)	1952	Nanjing	Navy	Deputy Corps	
14	Naval University of Engineering (海军工程大学)	1949	Wuhan	Navy	Deputy Corps	Recruits gaokao students.
15	Dalian Naval Academy (海军大连舰艇学院)	1949	Dalian	Navy	Deputy Corps	Recruits gaokao students.
16	Naval Submarine Academy (海军潜艇学院)	1973	Qingdao	Navy	Deputy Corps	Recruits gaokao students.
17	Naval Aviation University (海军航空大学)	1950	Yantai	Navy		Recruits gaokao students.
18	Naval Medical University (海军军医大学)	1949	Shanghai	Navy	Deputy Corps	Recruits gaokao students.
19	Naval Service Academy (海军勤务学院)	1952	Tianjin	Navy	Deputy Corps	Junior officer training.
20	Naval NCO School (海军士官学校)	1986	Bengbu	Navy	Division	Specialist School
21	Air Force Command College (空军指挥学院)	1958	Beijing	Air Force	Deputy Corps	
22	Air Force Engineering University (空军工程大学)	1959	Xi'an	Air Force	Deputy Corps	Recruits gaokao students.
23	Air Force Aviation University (空军航空大学)	1978	Changchun	Air Force	Deputy Corps	Recruits gaokao students.
24	Air Force Early Warning Academy (空军预警学院)	1952	Wuhan	Air Force	Deputy Corps	Recruits gaokao students.
25	Air Force Harbin Flight Academy (空军哈尔滨飞行学院)	1949	Harbin	Air Force	Deputy Corps	Officer training. Recruits only AFAU graduates
26	Air Force Shijiazhuang Flight Academy (空军石家庄飞行学院)	1949	Shijiazhuang	Air Force	Deputy Corps	Officer training. Recruits only AFAU graduates
27	Air Force Xi'an Flight Academy (空军西安飞行学院)	1949	Xi'an	Air Force	Deputy Corps	Officer training. Recruits only AFAU graduates
28	Air Force Medical University (空军军医大学)	1952	Xi'an	Air Force	Deputy Corps	Recruits gaokao students.
29	Air Force Logistics Academy (空军勤务学院)	1954	Xuzhou	Air Force	Deputy Corps	
30	Air Force Communication NCO Academy (空军通信士官学校)	1986	Dalian	Air Force	Division	Specialist school
31	Rocket Force Command College (火箭军指挥学院)	1977	Wuhan	Rocket Force	Deputy Corps	
32	Rocket Force University of Engineering (火箭军工程大学)	1951	Xi'an	Rocket Force	Deputy Corps	Recruits gaokao students.
33	Rocket Force NCO School (火箭军士官学校)	1971	Weifang	Rocket Force	Division	Specialist school
34	Strategic Support Force Space Engineering University (战略支援部队航天工程大学)	1978	Beijing	Aerospace Force	Division	Recruits gaokao students. Name change soon in 2024
35	Strategic Support Force Information Engineering University (战略支援部队信息工程大学)	1931	Zhengzhou	Information Support Force	Deputy Corps	Recruits gaokao students. Name change soon in 2024

=== People's Armed Police institutions ===
#	Institution Name	Founded	Location	Branch	Grade	Remarks
1	PAP Command College (武警指挥学院)	1980	Tianjin	People's Armed Police		
2	Engineering University of the PAP (武警工程大学)	1983	Xi'an	PAP		Recruits gaokao students.
3	Officers' College of the PAP (中国人民武装警察部队警官学院)	1984	Chengdu	PAP		Recruits gaokao students.
4	Special Police Unit Academy (武警特种警察学院)	1982	Beijing	PAP		Recruits gaokao students.
5	Logistics University of the People's Armed Police (武警后勤学院)	1980	Tianjin	PAP Logistics		
6	Non-Commissioned Officers Academy of the PAP (武警士官学校)	1984	Hangzhou	PAP		
7	China Coast Guard Academy (中国海警学院)	1983	Ningbo	PAP		

== See also ==
- Seven Sons of National Defence
