= Army Academy of Border and Coastal Defence =

Chinese military academic institution

- 中国人民解放军陆军边海防学院
- Logo of the Army Academy of Border and Coastal Defense
- Type: Military
- Established: 2017
- Affiliations: People's Liberation Army Ground Force
- Officer in charge: Maj Gen Ma Qinglei (马庆雷)
- Academic staff: 160
- Location: No 9 Huaishanlu Jiazi, Ziniu subdistrict, Chang'an district, Xi'an, Shaanxi (陕西省西安市长安区子午街道环山路甲字9号) China, 710100
- Campus: Multiple

The Army Academy of Border and Coastal Defense is an academic institution affiliated to the People's Liberation Army Ground Force (PLAGF). It is a specialized academy for the preparation of border and coastal guard forces. Its main campus is in Xi'an, Shaanxi, and it has two secondary campuses in Urumqi, Xinjiang and Kunming, Sichuan.

== History ==
The academy was formed in 2017 by the merging of three academic institutions with fairly long histories.

=== PLA Border Defense College ===
In July 1941, the seventh branch of the Chinese Counter-Japanese Military and Political University was established in Xingxian County, Shanxi Province. In September 1948, it was renamed the Northwest Military and Political University.

In 1951, the PLA North China Military Region's Officer School was renamed the PLA First Infantry School. Wang Lanlin and Zhou Zhigao successively served as principals, and Long Bingchu served as political commissar. In 1955, it was renamed the Tianshui Infantry School of the PLA. In October 1962, it was renamed the PLA Infantry School of the Lanzhou Military Region. Xie Songbai served as the principal, and Kang Yingzhong served as the political commissar. In 1969, during the Cultural Revolution, the Infantry School of Lanzhou Military Region was abolished.

In January 1974, the school was reopened and renamed the Military and Political Cadres School of the PLA Lanzhou Military Region, stationed in Cao Village, Chang'an County, Shaanxi Province (now Chang'an District, Xi'an). On February 21, 1978, it was named again the Infantry School of the Lanzhou Military Region. On January 20, 1981, it was renamed Xi'an Army School of the Chinese People's Liberation Army. In June 1986, it was upgraded to the PLA Xi'an Army Academy. In December 2004, the Urumqi Army Academy and the Urumqi Military Medical College were merged and reorganized into the Urumqi Border Cadre Training Brigade of the Xi'an Army Academy. On September 8, 2011, it was renamed the PLA Border Defense College.

In 2016, in the process of the military reform, the Lanzhou Military Region was dissolved, and the college was transferred to the direct control of the PLAGF.

=== Chinese People's Liberation Army Urumqi Ethnic Cadre College ===
In November 1949, the Xinjiang Military Region Military and Political Cadre School of the Chinese People's Liberation Army was established. Established on 20 December 1949, it was responsible for the reeducation of the defecting officers from the Kuomintang uprising. The school opened in January 1950.

In July 1951, the Second Infantry School was established based on the Xinjiang Military Region Military and Political Cadre School. In 1951, the Xinjiang Military Region Russian Language College was established on the basis of the Russian language team of the former Political Cadre School.

The Bayi Agricultural College was created on the basis of the Second Infantry School on 1 August 1952, under the Xinjiang Military Region. In October 1954, the college was placed under the leadership of the Xinjiang Production and Construction Corps. In June 1953, based on the Cultural Accelerated Brigade of the Bayi Agricultural College, the Xinjiang Military Region Cultural Accelerated Education Middle School (for adults) of the PLA was formed, responsible for the task of learning cultural knowledge for platoon, company, and battalion cadres of the Xinjiang Military Region. School started on July 1, 1953. By the end of November 1953, there were 419 students, organized into 9 upper elementary classes and 4 lower elementary classes. In September 1954, junior high school students were recruited, and it was renamed the Fourth Cultural Accelerated Education High School of the Northwest Military Region. In October 1954, it was renamed the Fourth Cultural Accelerated Education High School of the PLA. Canceled in February 1958.

In November 1958, the Xinjiang Military Region Cadre School was merged with the Accelerated Middle School, the Military Region Cadre Training Team, and the Ili Military Region Ethnic Cadre Training Team. In November 1962, it was renamed the Infantry School of the Xinjiang Military Regionand exercised division-level authority. After the start of the Cultural Revolution, teaching was interrupted. In February 1969, the school was abolished by the Central Military Commission. In March 1975, the Xinjiang Military and Political Cadre School was formally established in accordance with the Central Military Commission's decision on the restoration and establishment of 41 more colleges and universities throughout the military, and the School was given Corps-level grade. In January 1978, the Military and Political Cadre School was reorganized into the Infantry School of the Xinjiang Military Region of the Chinese People's Liberation Army. In February 1981, the name was changed to the Urumqi Army School, which still exercised a Corps-level unit. In August 1986, during the one-million-men troop reduction, the school merged with the Military Medical School of the Urumqi Military Region, the Communications Training Brigade of the Urumqi Military Region, the Logistics Training Brigade of the Urumqi Military Region, and the Ordnance Mechanic and Automobile Mechanic Training Brigade of the Urumqi Military Region, and was streamlined and reorganized into a training brigade of the Xi'an Army Academy. There were more than 1,200 people enrolled in the brigade every year, making it the largest training brigade in the military at the time.

In March 1993, it was adjusted and reformed into the Urumqi Branch of the Xi'an Army Academy of the Chinese People's Liberation Army. In July 1999, it merged with the Hutubi Branch of Lanzhou Medical College and was reorganized into the Urumqi Army College of the Chinese People's Liberation Army (Urumqi Military Medical College of the Chinese People's Liberation Army), with a full division grade and affiliated to the Lanzhou Military Region.

In December 2004, it was reorganized into the Chinese People's Liberation Army Xi'an Army Academy Border Defense Cadre Training Brigade (Military Medical Training Brigade), given a deputy division grade, and affiliated to the Xinjiang Military Region. In September 2011, it was upgraded to the Chinese People's Liberation Army Urumqi Ethnic Cadre College (the Chinese People's Liberation Army Lanzhou Military Region Comprehensive Training Base, externally known as the Chinese People's Liberation Army Urumqi Ethnic Cadre College). The founding meeting was held on September 19, 2011.

In 2016, in the course of deepening the reform of national defense and the army, the Lanzhou Military Region of the Chinese People's Liberation Army was transferred to the Army of the Western Theater Command of the Chinese People's Liberation Army. It is called the Chinese People's Liberation Army Urumqi Ethnic Cadre College (the Chinese People's Liberation Army Western Theater Army Urumqi Comprehensive Training Base).

=== Chinese People's Liberation Army Kunming Cadre College for Nationalities ===
In June 1949, the military and battalion schools of the Fourth Corps of the Chinese People's Liberation Army merged to establish the Fourth Branch of the Military and Political University of the Second Field Army of the PLA in Nanchang, Jiangxi Province. Later in 1949, the Fourth Branch of the Second Field Army Military and Political University was renamed as the Jiangxi Branch of the Second Field Army Military and Political University of the PLA.

In March 1950, the university was moved from Nanchang to Kunming, Yunnan Province, and was renamed Southwest Military and Political University Yunnan Branch. In 1951, the Southwest Military and Political University Yunnan Branch was separated and restructured into the Junior Infantry School of the Yunnan Military Region. In 1951, it was divided into the Fifth Infantry School and the Seventh Infantry School of the Chinese People's Liberation Army. In 1953, the Fifth Infantry School and the Seventh Infantry School were combined into the Third Infantry School of the Chinese People's Liberation Army.

In 1955, the name was changed to Kunming Infantry School. In 1963, the name was changed again to the Infantry School of the Kunming Military Region of the Chinese People's Liberation Army. In 1965, the Kunming Military Region Foreign Languages College of the PLA was established, with joint offices with the Infantry School. In 1969, during the Cultural Revolution, the Kunming Military Region Infantry School was abolished and the Kunming Military Region Foreign Languages College was abolished.

In 1974, the Kunming Military Region Infantry School was restored and renamed the Kunming Military Region Military and Political Cadre School. In 1978, the name was changed to the Infantry School of the Kunming Military Region of the Chinese People's Liberation Army. In 1981, it was renamed Kunming Army School. In June 1986, it was upgraded to the Kunming Army Academy. In September 1986, it was merged with the Chengdu Army School.

In 2016, in the course of the 2015 reforms, the Chengdu Military Region was abolished and the academy was transferred to the Southern Theater Command's PLAGF, and was renamed the Kunming National Cadre College of the Chinese People's Liberation Army.

The final creation of the academy was on 8 August 2017, the Border Defense College in Xi'an, Urumqi National Cadre College, and the Kunming National Cadre College were merged and restructured into the Chinese People's Liberation Army Army Border and Coastal Defense College. The college became the only higher education institution for border and coastal defense in the military.

== Organization ==
=== Administrative Departments ===
Just before the merger, the functional department of all three component institutions were:

- Training Department (训练部) that served as the Headquarters Department
- Political Department (政治部)
- School Affairs Department (校务部 / 院务部), which was responsible for all facilities and logistics
- Scientific Research Department (科研部)

=== Academic departments ===
- Command Information & Systems Engineering (指挥信息系统工程)
- Chinese Culture and Literature (中国语言文学类)
- Combat Command (作战指挥)
- Firepower Command & Control Engineering (火力指挥与控制工程)

=== Majors ===
The undergraduate majors offered in the 2023 admissions brochure are:

- Command Information Systems Engineering (指挥信息系统工程)
- Firepower Command and Control Engineering (火力指挥与控制工程)
- Chinese Language and Literature (中国语言文学类)
- Combat Command (作战指)

Students have language requirements of English and at least one border language (Kazakh, Russian, etc.) The main specialties are classified as:

- Border and Coastal Defense Strategy (边海防战略)
- Border and Coastal Defense Command (边海防指挥)

=== Campus ===
When it was established in 2017, the Chinese People's Liberation Army Army Border and Coastal Defense College mainly consisted of the main campus in Xi'an, and two campuses in Urumqi and Kunming, with a total area of nearly 2,600 hectares (6,400 acres) (40,000 mu). It is deployed in 26 locations in three districts: Xi'an, Urumqi, and Kunming.

== See also ==
- Academic institutions of the armed forces of China
- CMC Training Administration Department
- General Administration of Sport of China
- National Border Control and Coastal Defense Commission
- Border Defense Bureau of the National Defense Mobilization Department
- National Immigration Authority
- China Coast Guard Academy
