= Army Special Operations Academy =

Chinese military academy

- 中国人民解放军陆军特种作战学院
- Logo of the Army Special Operations Academy
- Type: Military Academy
- Established: 2017; 9 years ago
- Dean: Maj Gen Huang Xinbing (黄新炳)
- Political Commissar: Maj Gen Cheng Bafu (程伯福)
- Address: 33 Chongxin Rd, Xiangshan District, (广西壮族自治区桂林市象山区崇信路33号), Guilin, Guangxi, China; 25.2438°N 110.2825°E
- Affiliations: People's Liberation Army Ground Force
- Location in Guangxi

The Chinese People's Liberation Army Ground Force Special Operations Academy (MOE code 91009), the Special Services' Operations College, or the Army Special Operations Academy for short, is a Corps Deputy-grade military academic institution affiliated with the People's Liberation Army Ground Force. It is headquartered in Guilin and it is mainly responsible for the training of Army Special Operations command officers.

== History ==
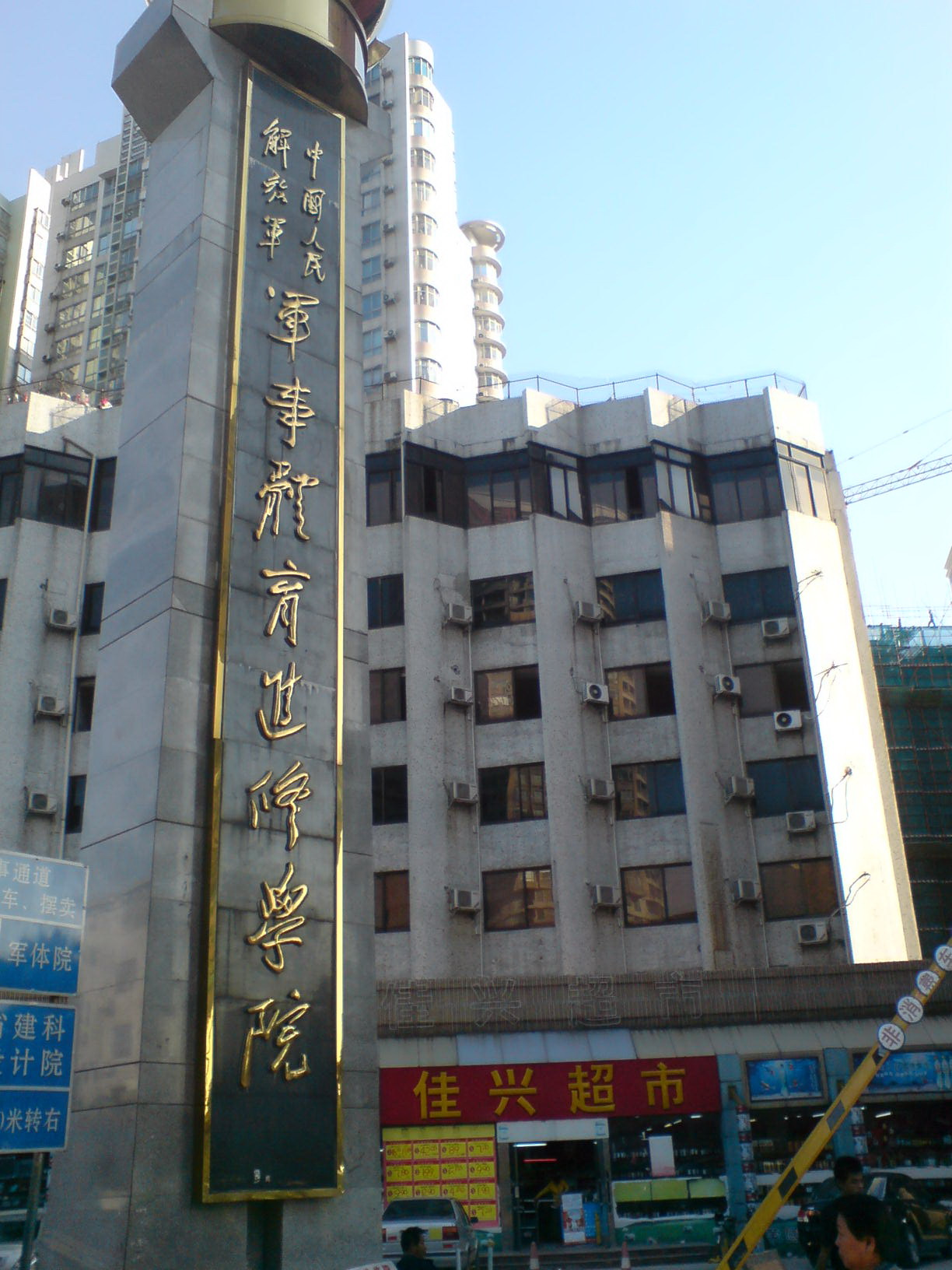
The PLA Military Sports Comprehensive Training Base in 2008, located at Guangdong Province Guangzhou City Tianhe District Shahe Subdistrict Yudongxi Road 38

In June 2017, the Army Special Operations Academy was created from the merger of the Special Operations Academy and Guilin Integrated Training Base.

=== PLA Special Operations Academy ===
- The Special Operations Academy was founded in November 1949 as the Guangdong Military and Political University.
- In August 1950, the university was renamed the Central South Military and Political University 6th branch campus.
- In March 1951, it was reformed as the 25th Infantry School.
- In July 1953, it was reformed as the Military Physical Education School.
- In August 1957, the school was abolished; some members formed the General Staff Department (GSD) Physical Education Cadre Training Group.
- In January 1961, the group expanded and was established as the Physical Education Academy.
- In April 1969, the academy broke up due to the Cultural Revolution. The Guangzhou Military Region Physical Education Training Group was created in its place.
- In April 1973, the group expanded and was reformed as the Military Physical Education Training Group.
- In September 1974, it was reinstated as the Physical Education Academy.
- In October 1992, the academy was divided into the GSD Physical Education Department and the Communications and Command Academy.
- In 1993, the Physical Education Academy was reestablished and began to admit graduate students.
- In June 1999, the academy's specialized communication training responsibilities were assigned to other units while the Bayi Military Physical Fitness Team was integrated into the academy.
- In 2003, the Physical Education Academy was reformed as the Military Physical Exercise Integrated Training Base.
- In 2011, the training base merged with the Institute of International Relations Reconnaissance and Special Operations Command Department to became the Special Operations Academy.
- In 2016, the Special Operations Academy was assigned to the PLA Army HQ.

=== PLA Southern Theater Command Army Guilin Integrated Training Base ===
- The Guilin Integrated Training Base was founded in April 1955 in Chongqing City, Sichuan Province as the Beibei Infantry School.
- In May 1958, the school relocated to Guilin City and was renamed the Guilin Infantry School.
- In August 1961, it was renamed the Guangzhou Military Region Infantry School.
- In July 1968, the school was abolished.
- In October 1973, the Guangzhou Military Region Military and Political Cadres School was established at the same location.
- In January 1978, it was renamed the Guangzhou Military Region Infantry School again.
- In February 1981, it was renamed the Guilin Army School.
- In September 1986, it was renamed the Guilin Army Academy.
- In 2005, the Guilin Army Academy and Guangzhou Military Region Communications Training Group merged to become the Guangzhou Military Region Integrated Training Base.
- In January 2016, it was assigned to the Southern Theater Command and renamed the Southern Theater Command Army Guilin Integrated Training Base.

== Organizational structure ==
=== Specialties ===
After its establishment in 2017, the PLA Army Special Operations Academy established 3 specialties:

- Combat Command (Special Operations Detachment Command, Reconnaissance Detachment Command, Marine Detachment Command, Airborne Detachment Command)
- Reconnaissance intelligence (Reconnaissance Detachment command)
- Command Information Systems Engineering (Special Operations Detachment Command, Reconnaissance Detachment Command)

=== Departments ===
- Special Operations
- Intelligence and Reconnaissance
- Sniper Operations
- Military Physical Fitness

=== Research Labs and Centers ===
- All-Army Advanced and Intermediate Sniper Training Center
- Army Chinese Communist Party Innovation Theory Learning Research Center
- Military Physical Education Development and Strategy Research Center
- Physical Fitness Training Center
- All-Army Reconnaissance Special Warfare Professional Training and Cultivation Base
- Military Political Work Teaching and Research Laboratory

=== Campuses ===
The Guilin main campus covers an area of over 800 hectares (2,000 acres) (12,000 mu). The main campus is located at No.33 Chongxin Road, Xiangshan District, Guilin City, Guangxi Zhuang Autonomous Region. The campus and associated areas include 90 technical training sites, four multiple combat terrain training sites, and a large instructional complex.

Given its origin as a physical education institution, the Chinese People's Liberation Army Special Operations College has remained a center for military sports training. The academy has repeatedly become a national sports training base, in 2007 being named the National Taekwongdo Southern Training Base. The academy has served as a winter training site for the Chinese national boxing team and the Chinese national men's taekwondo team. The academy also served as a training ground for the Chinese national boxing team, the Chinese national shooting team, and other teams preparing for the 2008 Olympic Games.

== See also ==
- Academic institutions of the armed forces of China
- PLA Special Forces
- CMC Training and Administration Department
- People's Armed Police Special Operations College
- CMC Training Administration Department Military Sports Training Center（Bayi Sports Brigade）
- General Administration of Sport of China
