= Air Force Command College =

PLAAF military university in Beijing

Coordinates: 39.968061°N 116.278519°E

- 中国人民解放军空军指挥学院
- Air Force Command College logo
- Type: Public research university
- Established: 1958; 68 years ago (predecessor); 2017; 9 years ago (current entity)
- Parent institution: Central Military Commission
- Affiliations: PLAAF
- President: Lt Gen Yu Qingjiang (俞庆江)（2015年10月—）
- Vice-president: Maj Gen Wang Zhixue (王志学)
- Academic staff: 120 professors and over 30 researchers.
- Location: Haidian District North Fourth Ring Road West No. 88 (北京市海淀区北四环西路88号), Beijing, China
- Campus: Urban, 41.4 hectares (102 acres)

The Air Force Command College (AFCC), MOE Code (院校代码): 91023, is the highest academic institution of the Chinese People's Liberation Army Air Force (PLAAF), with a corps deputy grade, and it is tasked with training the commanding officer corps for the force. It is based in Beijing, right next to the Kunming Lake and the Beijing Xijiao Airport. It is an intermediate command school for the training of mid-level and senior command officers, staff officers, and master's and doctoral students in military science for the PLA Air Force. It is also tasked with providing decision-making consultations to the head of the Air Force Party Committee.

== History ==
The AFCC was established in 1958 as the PLAAF College (中国空军学院) in Nanjing. It was abolished in 1969. In 1974, the "Air Force Military and Political Cadre School" (空军军政干部学校) was established to take its place. In 1986, the Air Force College was renamed again to the Air Force Command College. In 2006, the college was included in the military project 2110 (2110工程), the military counterpart to the project 211. As part of the 2017 military reform, the Air Force Command College was considered "refounded" despite remaining in the same location and retaining its staff and structure, and like most Chinese military academic institutions, it got downgraded to Corps Deputy-grade.

In the first 50 years since its establishment, the academy trained more than 50,000 command and staff personnel for the Air Force and other services and arms. Since 2000 it has also offered courses in English for foreign officers, and as of 2010, it had also trained 511 foreign officers from 62 countries (including Bangladesh, Chile, Egypt, Malaysia, Myanmar, Nigeria, Pakistan, Philippines, Saudi Arabia, Singapore, Sri Lanka, Tanzania, Uganda, and Venezuela). The college has completed 175 key national, military and air force projects, compiled more than 260 textbooks, published more than 180 monographs and translations, and published more than 7,000 academic papers inside and outside the military. It has received more than 530 national, military and air force level awards. The college also founded several academic journals such as "Air Force Military Studies" 《空军军事学术》, "Foreign Air Forces Military Studies"《外国空军军事学术》, and "Air Force Pilot"《空军领航》. "Air Force Military Studies" is considered one of the core military journals of the Chinese military.

== Organization ==
=== Administrative and functional departments (部门) ===
The internal structure consists of the following seven division-grade organizations:

- General Office (办公室)
- Political Work Division (政治工作处)
- Teaching and Support Division (教育保障处 / 教保处)
- Teaching Affairs Division (教务处)
- Management/Administration Division (管理处)
- Supply Support Division (供应保障处)
- Discipline Inspection and Supervision Division (纪检监察处)

=== Academic departments ===
AFCC has seven identified academic departments:

- Campaign and Tactics Department (战役战术系)
- Combat Command Department (作战指挥系)
- Military Political Work Department (军队政治工作系)
- Logistics and Equipment Department (后勤与装备系)
- Graduate Student Management Group (研究生管理大队)
- Foreign Training Department (外训系)
- Foreign Language Department (外语系)

The college also carries a "Campaign Training and Theory Research Course" (战役训练与理论研究班) that is separate from any department, but it is unclear as to what the course it actually entails and whom is taught.

=== Research Labs and Centers ===
There is one Key Lab (重点实验室): the Joint Operations Simulation and Research on Major Topics Lab (联合作业推演和重大课题研究)

There are 15 teaching labs (教研室), including: Military Theory, Military Strategy, Military Campaigns, Military Tactics, and Combat Command (军事理论, 战略, 战役, 战术, 作战指挥等十五个教研室). There are nine Research labs (研究室) including: Military Strategy, Military Campaigns and Tactics, and Combat Operations (战略, 战役战术, 作战运筹等九个研究室).

A Graduate Student Management Group (研究生管理大队) oversees graduate programs.

There are 12 Cadet/student teams (队 / 区队) and groups (大队).

=== Courses and programs ===
- Associate and bachelor's degrees
- Masters and Specialties
  - Air Force Campaigns (空军战役学)
  - Air Force Strategy (空军战略学)
  - Air Force Tactics (空军战术学)
  - Air Force Combat Command (空军作战学)
  - Air Force Logistics (空军后勤学)
  - Military History (军事历史)
  - Military Operations (军事运筹)
  - Military Management (军队管理)
  - Military Political Work (军队政治工作)
  - Air Force Equipment (军队装备)
  - Military Thought (军事思想)
- Doctoral degrees (博士)
- Post-doctoral Specializations (博士后)

=== Recruitment ===
The college does recruit gaokao students just out of high school. Generally, however, it focuses on active service personnel.

The requirement for applicants are similar to those for entering PLA service. Post-graduate work has additional requirements.

== Campus and Facilities ==
AFCC's campus is located just inside the 4th ring road, in the NW of Beijing. The AFCC occupies approximately 621 mu - 41.4 hectares (102 acres).

== See also ==
- Academic institutions of the armed forces of China
