= Rocket Force Command College =

Military academy in Wuhan, China

The PLA Rocket Force Command College
- 中国人民解放军火箭军指挥学院
- Type: Public military academy
- Established: 2017
- Affiliations: PLA Rocket Force
- Director: Maj Gen Lan Jiyin [兰吉银]
- Political Commissar: Maj Gen Liu Zhihui [刘志辉]
- Academic staff: 306
- Location: No. 145 27th Avenue, Jiang'an district, Wuhan, Hubei province, China
- Campus: 96 hectares (240 acres); Urban
- Military grade: Deputy Corps grade

The People's Liberation Army Rocket Force Command College (MOE code 91033) is a Chinese military academy. It is the main academic institution of the Rocket Force. It is a Project 2110 institution, dedicated to training the command staff of the rocket force.

== History ==
- The college was founded in 1977 as the Second Artillery School.
- In 1979 it was renamed the Second Artillery College.
- In 1986, the college was renamed the Second Artillery Command College.
- The Command College began to offer doctoral degrees in 1993.
- In 2015, the college was renamed the Rocket Force Command College.

== Facilities ==
The campus is roughly 96 hectares (240 acres) (1,437 mu) of land, which include seven main teaching buildings, eight specialized training grounds, 47 laboratory rooms, 36 specialized classrooms, educational tech center, network center and simulation training center. The library has 410,000 volumes.

== Organizational structure ==
=== Academic departments ===
As of 2011, the college had the following departments:

- First Command Department
- Second Command Department
- Communications Department
- Engineering Department
- Combat Support Department

=== Labs ===
The college has one key lab, the Combat Command Lab and 20 teaching and research labs.

=== Cadet teams ===
The college has 20 cadet teams and 4 graduate student teams.

=== Professors and staff ===
The Command College had 306 instructors, including 24 professors, 71 associate professors, 4 senior engineers, and one senior lab instructor.

=== Degrees, majors, and specialties ===
The Command College offers specialist degrees, bachelor's degrees, master's degrees, and doctoral degrees for commanding officers. It offers four majors for doctoral degrees, and nine majors for master's degrees.

As of 2007, the college offered 17 bachelor's majors:

- Military Strategy
- Military Campaign
- Military Tactics
- Combat Command
- Political Work
- Logistics
- Equipment
- Communications
- Engineering

It also offered 76 unspecified specialties.

== Leadership ==
=== Principal ===
1. Maj Gen Wu Gengmei [武庚梅]（1977年12月—1983年5月）
2. Maj Gen Guo Jingting [郭敬亭]（1983年6月—1985年10月）
3. Maj Gen Huang Cisheng [黄次胜]（1985年11月—1990年6月）
4. Maj Gen Zhang Erwang [张二旺] 少将 Zhang Erwang（1990年6月—1996年12月）
5. Maj Gen Lu Haozhong [卢浩衷] 少将 Lu Haozhong（1996年12月—2002年7月）
6. Maj Gen Li Tilin [李体林] 少将 Li Tilin（2002年7月—2009年12月）
7. Maj Gen Zhang Junxiang [张军祥] 少将 Zhang Junxiang（2009年12月—2012年）
8. Maj Gen Xu Kunxia [徐坤侠]（2012年—2017年）
9. Maj Gen Lan Jiyin [兰吉银]（2017年—）

=== Political Commissar ===
1. Maj Gen Bai Shoukang [白寿康] (1978年7月—1979年2月）
1. Maj Gen Xiong Zhisheng [熊志生]（1979年2月—1983年5月）
2. Maj Gen Zhang Kangjue [张康爵]（1983年6月—1990年6月）
3. Maj Gen Wang Linshen [王林深]（1990年6月—1992年10月）
4. Maj Gen Li Jinghua [李景华]（1992年10月—1995年10月）
5. Maj Gen Zhao Guimao [赵贵卯]（1995年10月—？）
6. Maj Gen Li Guangqi [李广琪]（1996年12月—2005年10月）
7. Maj Gen Yao Wenchang [姚文长]（2005年10月—2009年5月）
8. Maj Gen Zhang Dongshui [张东水]（2009年5月—2010年12月）
9. Maj Gen Kong Fanshun [孔繁顺]（2010年12月—2012年9月）
10. Maj Gen Zhang Shenmin [张升民]（2012年9月—2013年12月）
11. Maj Gen Ma Li [马力]（2013年12月—2014年12月）
12. Maj Gen Zhou Jianbo [周建波]（2014年12月—?）
13. Maj Gen Liu Zhihui [刘志辉] (?-present)

== See also ==
- Academic institutions of the armed forces of China
