= PLA Naval Aviation University =

Aviation university in China

Naval Aviation University
- 中国人民解放军海军航空大学
- Motto: 忠诚、勇敢、弘毅、奋进
- Motto in English: Loyalty, Courage, Perseverance, Endeavor
- Type: Military academy
- Established: 1950; 76 years ago, original 2017; 9 years ago, current
- Affiliations: People's Liberation Army Navy
- Location: Erma Road 188, Zhifu district, Yantai, China; 37.532309°N 121.419672°E
- Website: hjzf.mil.cn/hjhkindex.html

Chinese name
- Simplified Chinese: 中国人民解放军海军航空大学
- Traditional Chinese: 中國人民解放軍海軍航空大學
Transcriptions
Standard Mandarin
- Hanyu Pinyin: Zhōngguó Rénmín Jiěfàngjūn Hǎijūn Hángkōng Dàxué
- Location within Shandong

The Naval Aviation University of the People's Liberation Army (MOE code: 91019) is an academic institution of the PLAN responsible for the education of the officers of the naval aviation corps. It is headquartered in Yantai City, Shandong Province, and is corps deputy grade. It is a higher military academy that focuses on training junior and middle-level command officers, flight officers, staff officers, air combat support officers, and aerospace engineering and technical officers for the naval aviation and coastal defense forces. It is also a major research center in the field of aerospace technology.

== History ==
The university is the result of a merger of two major military academies, the Naval Aviation Academy (海军航空兵学院) and the Naval Aviation Engineering Academy (海军航空工程学院). The institutional lineage is roughly as follows:

=== Naval Aviation Academy ===
- The Second Naval Aviation School: In 1950, the Naval Business School of the Chinese People's Liberation Army was established. On 19 September 1950, the Naval Business School and the Third Corps of the Second Field Army Military and Political University merged to form the "Second Naval Aviation School of the Chinese People's Liberation Army", located in Qingdao, Shandong
- The First Naval Aviation School: On 1 August 1950, the Central Military Commission and the Navy Party Committee established the "First Naval Aviation School" at a small airport left by the Japanese in Cangkou, Qingdao. On 1 November 1950, with the help of 74 Soviet experts headed by Soviet adviser Yainov and more than 20 graduates recruited from Peking University, Tsinghua University and other universities, the aviation school officially opened. The first president was Zhao Huichuan and the first political commissar was Gui Shaobin. The school's personnel was assembled from the Second Branch of the General Logistics Department of the Fourth Field Army, the Second Corps of the North China Military and Political University, the Air Force Command of the East China Military Region, the Hebei Military Region, and the Navy Command.
- On 1 January 1951, Navy Command issued Order No. 3: The Second Naval Aviation School was merged with the First Naval Aviation School, and the CMC renamed the combination the "Naval Aviation School of the PLA". On 17 January 1951, the school was formally established and located in Cangkou.
- In March 1952, the Naval Aviation School moved from Cangkou to Weixian, Shandong.
- On 14 July 1952, the Naval Aviation School was re-divided into two schools: the First Naval Aviation School was established at Weixian Airport (responsible for bomber air service), and the Second Naval Aviation School was established at Cangkou Airport in Qingdao (responsible for bomber and fighter ground service, it later became the Naval Aviation Technical College).
- In June 1954, the First Naval Aviation School moved from Weixian to Jinxi County, Liaoning Province (now Huludao City).
- Between December 1969 and January 1970, the school moved from Jinxi, to Changzhi City, Shanxi Province.
- In 1978, the First Naval Aviation School was renamed the "Naval Aviation School of the PLA".
- In January 1987, the school was renamed the "Naval Flight Academy of the PLA". It was denominated a junior service training school.
- In July 1990, the academy moved back from Changzhi to Huludao.
- In the 2000s, the flight academy was transformed from academic education to comprehensive primary-level flight training.
- On 8 March 2012, the "Naval Aviation Academy" was established. It was formed by the merger of the Naval Flight Academy and two naval training bases. It was directly subordinate to the PLAN. It was mainly responsible for the training of naval aviation intermediate command officers, shore-based and ship-based flight officers, combat training staff officers, anti-submarine early warning, air combat support officers, and land and sea parachute training. The headquarters was located at No. 1 Jiefang Road, Lianshan District, Huludao City.

=== Naval Aviation Engineering Academy (海军航空工程学院) ===
- In August 1950, the Sixth Artillery Division of the Northeast Military Region, the Sida Station of the Second Logistics Division of the Fourth Field Army, and the Tenth Artillery Regiment of the Special Column of the Southwest Military Region merged, and on 24 August 1950, the "Navy Coastal Artillery School" was established in Qingdao. Wang Xiaoming was appointed as the principal and Song Jinghua was appointed as the political commissar. The school opened on 9 October 1950.
- On March 2, 1951, the Central Military Commission decided to change the name of the school to the "Navy Artillery School".
- In September 1952, the school was moved to Yantai, Shandong. The original Qingdao campus was retained and later evolved into the Qingdao Branch and Training Base of the Naval Aviation Engineering College.
- In 1957, the Ordnance Department of the Naval Artillery School was separated and joined in the establishment of the Naval Technical School, which later became the University of Naval Engineering.
- In August 1959, the Naval Artillery School, the Naval Department of the 15th Air Force Aviation School, and the Naval Training Base Training Group were merged to form the "Naval Special Technical School" to train technical cadres for the missile force.
- On December 24, 1960, the Ministry of National Defense ordered the Naval Artillery School in Yantai to be rebuilt into the "Naval Senior Technical School". Sun Liangping was appointed as the principal and Yin Guohong as the political commissar. In addition to the original artillery command major, the school also opened various missile engineering and technical majors: missile engineering, which recruited high school graduates for a five-year course; missile technician major, which recruited junior high school graduates with a four-year course, plus other specialist officer courses such as missile command. At the same time, with the approval of the State Council, 67 professors, lecturers and engineers were selected from local colleges, factories and scientific research institutions to teach at the school.
- In 1961, the Naval Senior Technical School was upgraded to a corps grade unit, and the head of the school was promoted accordingly.
- In 1963, the National Defense Science and Technology Commission designated the academy as a key school.
- In January 1970, the school was moved to Nanjing, Jiangsu. In March 1970, it was reformed into the "Third Naval School"。
- In September 1974, the school was moved to Jinxi, Liaoning.
- On 14 April 1975, the CMC changed the name to the "PLAN Second Artillery School" and raised it to corps grade. The name was officially changed in June 1975
- On November 7, 1977, the Central Military Commission decided to raise the school into the "PLAN Second Artillery Academy". The name was officially changed in January 1978.
- In 1979, it was listed as a national key university by the State Council.
- In 1981, the Navy decided to expand their training and set up a training department, a political department, a school affairs department and an office, three academic departments, a soldier training brigade and various teaching and research offices in the PLAN Second Artillery Academy of the Navy.
- In 1985, the college started postgraduate education courses, and obtained the right to confer master's degrees in 1986.
- In June 1986, the Second Naval Artillery Academy was adjusted and merged with the First and Second Naval Aviation Maintenance Schools to form the "Naval Aviation Engineering Academy", relocated from Jinxi to Yantai, and the "Naval Aviation Technical College", located in Qingdao.
- In 1999, the Naval Aviation Technical College was merged with the Academy and became its Qingdao Branch.
- In 1999, the Naval Aviation Engineering Academy was granted the right to confer professional master's degrees in engineering.
- In 2000, it was granted the right to confer doctoral degrees. That same year, it participated in the evaluation of undergraduate teaching work of all military academies and won the first place. It was awarded the "Excellent Teaching Unit of All Military Academies" by the PLA Headquarters. It won again in 2010.
- In 2001, it began to recruit postdoctoral researchers.
- In 2003, a postdoctoral research mobile station was established. In the same year, it was listed as one of the 22 academic education institutions in the entire army.

=== Naval Aviation University ===
In 2017, in the process of deepening national defense and military reform, all military academies in China were reformed, and the Naval Aviation College and the Naval Aviation Engineering College were merged and reorganized to form the Naval Aviation University of the People's Liberation Army. The headquarters is located in Yantai, Shandong Province, with a satellite campus and training base in Qingdao, and flight training bases in Huludao, Changzhi, Qinhuangdao, and Jiyuan.

== Departments and Specialties ==
At the time of its establishment in 2017, the Naval Aviation University had 23 undergraduate majors, 6 engineering master's programs, 50 master's programs, 12 master's first-level disciplines, 18 doctoral programs, 4 doctoral first-level disciplines, 6 postdoctoral research mobile stations, within the four general fields of engineering, military science, sciences & technology, and management. There are 7 Shandong provincial-level key construction disciplines, 11 All PLA-level key construction disciplines, 1 national-level key discipline; 1 Shandong provincial-level key laboratory, 2 All PLA-level key laboratories, 1 national-level virtual experimental teaching center, and 1 national experimental teaching demonstration center. In the 2017 invitation to application, the following specialties and directions (the associated positions with the specialties) were listed:

Undergraduate specialties and directions
Specialty	Chinese	Direction	Chinese
Airfield Management Engineering	场站管理工程	Aviation Service Technology & Command	航空勤务技术与指挥
Missile Engineering	导弹工程	Shore-based Defense Missile Technology & Command	岸防导弹技术与指挥
Navigation Engineering	导航工程	Navigation Technology & Command	地面领航 / 航空管制
Electrical Engineering & Automation	电气工程及其自动化	Aviation Maintenance Technology & Command	航空机务技术与指挥
Electronic Information Engineering	电子信息工程	Aviation Maintenance Technology & Command / Aerial Combat Service	航空机务技术与指挥/空中战勤
Aircraft Design & Engineering	飞行器设计与工程	Aviation Maintenance Technology & Command	航空机务技术与指挥
Air Traffic Control & Navigation Engineering	航空管制与领航工程	Ground-based Navigation / Air Traffic Control	导航技术与指挥
Firepower Command & Control Engineering	火力指挥与控制工程	Shore-based Defense Missile Technology & Command	岸防导弹技术与指挥
Mechatronic Engineering	机械电子工程	Aviation Service Shore Technology & Command / Carrier-based Aircraft Takeoff & Landing Support & Command	航空勤务技术与指挥 / 舰载机起降保障与指挥
Rescue & Salvage Engineering	救助与打捞工程	Aviation Rescue	航空救生
Detection Guidance & Control Technology	探测制导与控制技术	Shore-based Defense Missile Technology & Command	导航技术与指挥
Unmanned Aerial Vehicle System Engineering	无人系统工程	Unmanned Aerial Vehicle Utilization & Command	无人机运用与指挥
Unmanned Aerial Vehicle Equipment Engineering	无人装备工程	Unmanned Aerial Vehicle Technical Support & Maintenance	无人机技术保障与维修
Weapons Launch Engineering	武器发射工程	Island Reef Guard Sub-unit Command	岛礁守备分队指挥
Weapon Systems Engineering	武器系统工程	Aviation Maintenance Technology & Command	航空机务技术与指挥
Combat/Operations Command	作战指挥	Unit Group Training Management	部队组训管理

== Campuses ==
The university has two main campuses, two training centers and six field stations (场站) for training.

- Main campus (Erma Lu 188, Zhifu district, Yantai, Shandong)
- Qingdao campus (Siliu Zhonglu 2, Licang district, Qingdao, Shandong)
- Qingdao training base
- Huludao field station (Originally the 1st Flight Training Base of the Naval Aviation Academy)
- Changzhi field station (originally the 2nd Flight Training Base of the Naval Aviation Academy)
- Xingcheng field station
- Jiyuan field station (originally the 1st Training Base of the Naval Aviation Academy)
- Handan field station
- Xingtai field station (originally 2nd Training Base of the Naval Aviation Academy)
- Simulated flight training center (模拟飞行训练中心) Beijing

== Leadership ==
Naval Aviation Academy

Principal

- Zhao Huichuan (赵汇川) (1950 – 1952)
- Zhao Xiaozhou (赵晓舟) (1952 – 1959)
- Yang Li (杨力) (1959 – 1960)
- Chen Wei (陈伟) (1960 – 1968)
- Qin Linyu (秦令余) (1968 – ?)

(gap in the data)

- Zhang Yongyi (张永义) Sr Cpt (? – ?)
- Yin Changzhi (尹长志) Rear Adm (Dec 1993 – Dec 1998)
- Li Fang (李方) Rear Adm (Dec 1998 – ?)
- Li Jianmin (李建民) Rear Adm (2007 – Jul 2015)
- Zhang Xuejun (张学军) Rear Adm (Jul 2015 – 2016)
- Wang Tianlin (王天林) Rear Adm (2016 – 2017)

Political commissar

- Gui Shaobin (桂绍斌) (1950 – 1952)
- Du Xishu (杜西书) (1954 – 1959)
- Hou Jianhua (侯建华) (1959 – 1968)
- Zhou Yaochang (周耀昌) (1968 – ?)

(gap in the data)

- Zhou Chunshan (周春山) Rear Adm (? – ?)
- Guo Zhanbo (郭占波) Rear Adm (Jul 1999 – Jul 2003)
- Zhang Zhanjun (张占军) Rear Adm (Jul 2003 – ?)
- Wang Jin (王进) Rear Adm (? – 2013)
- Wang Zaichun (王再春) Rear Adm (2013 – 2016)
- Wang Jundong (王军东) Rear Adm (2016 – 2017)

Naval Aviation Engineering Academy

Principal

- Wang Xiaoming (王效明) (Jul 1950 – Aug 1953)
- Sun Liangping (孙亮平) 大校 (1956 – 1960，海军炮兵学校校长；1960 – ?，海军高级专科学校校长)
- Zhao Youfu (赵友夫) (Feb 1969 – Dec 1979)
- Wang Bingshou (王屏寿) (Dec 1979 – Jun 1986)
- Shi Zhongren (史忠仁) Rear Adm (Jun 1986 – Aug 1992)
- Li Bingqiao (李秉桥) Rear Adm (Aug 1992 – Dec 2001)
- Qin Lanyue (秦兰悦) Rear Adm (Dec 2001 – Dec 2005)
- He You (何友) Rear Adm (Dec 2005 – 2013)
- Li Ming (李鸣) Rear Adm (2014 – 2017)

Political commissar

- Song Jinghua (宋景华) (1950 – 1952)
- Xu Zhizhong (胥治中) (1952 – 1956)
- Wang Dahua (王大华) Sr Cpt (1956 – ?)
- Yin Guohong (殷国洪) Rear Adm (? – ?)

(gap in the data)

- Nie Hongguo (聂洪国) (? – ?，海军第二炮兵学校、海军第二炮兵学院政治委员)
- Liu Zuoliang (刘作良) (Jun 1986 – Jul 1990)
- Li Zhongwen (李忠文) Rear Adm (Jul 1990 – Oct 1992)
- Guo Dongya (郭东亚) Rear Adm (199210月 – Dec 1994)
- Kang Xiufeng (康秀峰) Rear Adm (199412月 – Dec 1998)
- Xu Yitian (徐一天) Rear Adm (199812月 – Jul 2003)
- Wang Shichen (王世臣) Rear Adm (? – ?)
- Qi Rongxiang (祁荣祥) Rear Adm (? – ?)
- Yang Shiguang (杨世光) Rear Adm (2008 – 2011)
- Gong Lihua (龚理华) Rear Adm (2011 – 2016)

Naval Aviation University

Principal

- Wang Tianlin (王天林) Rear Adm (2017 – )

Political commissar

- Xu Lixian (徐立谦) Rear Adm (2017 – )

== Notable alumni ==
- Wang Zhongcai, vice admiral in the People's Liberation Army Navy.

== See also ==
- People's Liberation Army Naval Air Force
- Academic institutions of the armed forces of China
- Naval University of Engineering
- Air Force Engineering University
