= PLA Army Academy of Artillery and Air Defense =

Chinese military academy

- 中国人民解放军陆军炮兵防空兵学院
- Logo of the Army Academy of Artillery and Air Defense
- Type: Military academy
- Established: 2017
- Affiliations: People's Liberation Army Ground Force
- Academic staff: 1 academician, 4 specialist teaching major generals, 184 professors, and 305 associate professors
- Location: Main campus Huangshanlu 451, Shushan District, Hefei City, Anhui, China; Nanjing campus Zuochang 3, Jiangning District, Nanjing, Jiangsu, China; Zhengzhou campus Jianshe donglu 24, Erqi District, Zhengzhou, Hebei, China; NCO school Dayingjie 31, Dongling District, Shenyang, Liaoning, China; 31.841888°N 117.237859°E
- Campus: 5,700 hectares (14,000 acres) (84,798 mu)
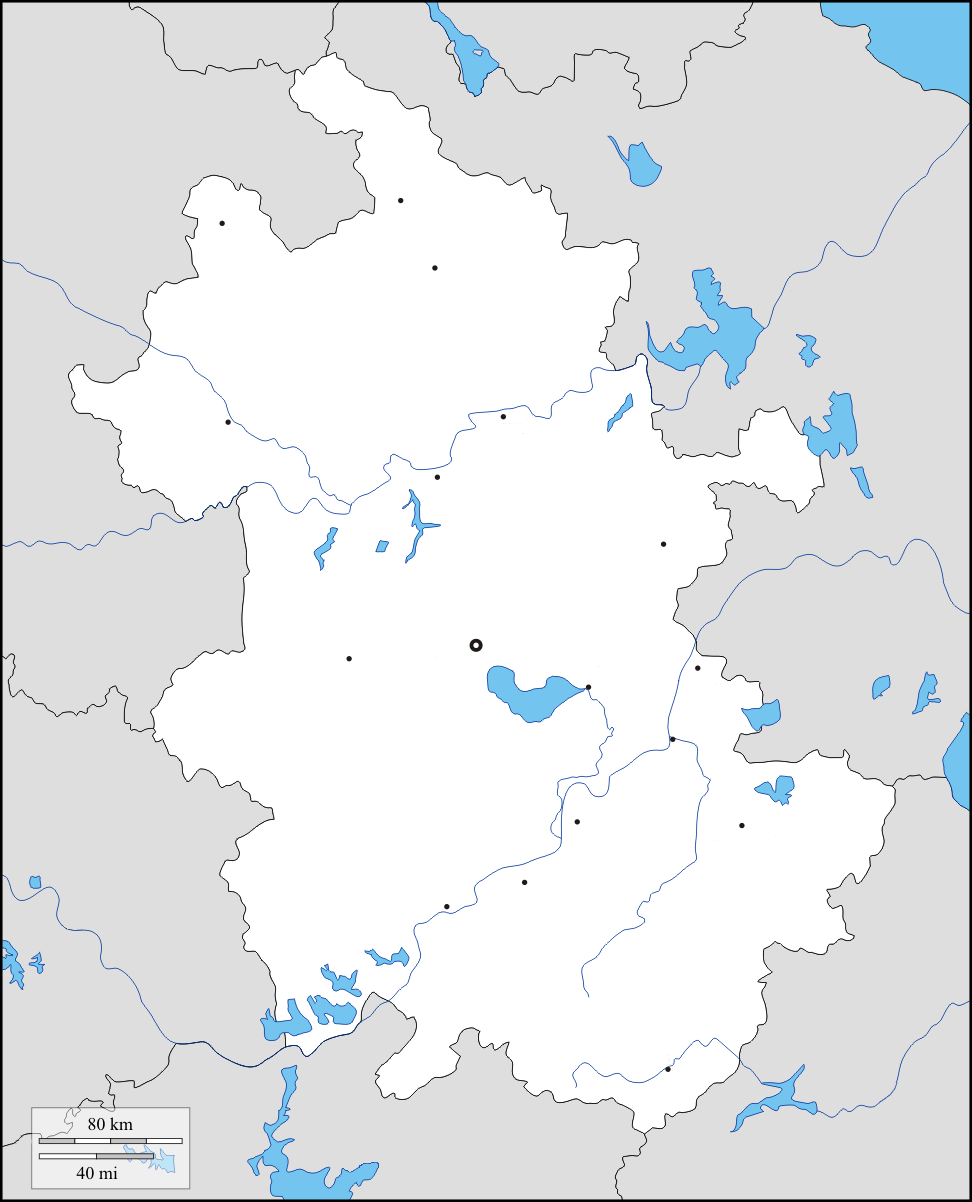
- Location in Anhui

The People's Liberation Army Army Academy of Artillery and Air Defense (MOE: 91007) is a military school of deputy corps grade subordinate to the PLA Ground Force. It is responsible for officer, graduate, and NCO training for the PLA artillery forces. The academy was created in 2017 by merging four existing academies.

== History ==
=== PLA Army Command College (中国人民解放军陆军军官学院) ===
- In 1977, the Central Military Commission decided to establish the "People's Liberation Army Artillery Technical College". Preparatory work began immediately. It was directly under the leadership of the General Staff Department, with a corps grade.
- In 1978, with the approval of the CMC, it moved from Zhengzhou to Hefei
- In 1986, it was renamed the "Hefei Artillery College".
- In July 1999, Chairman of the CMC Jiang Zemin signed an order to merge the Hefei Artillery College and the Nanjing Artillery College to form the "People's Liberation Army Artillery College." The college headquarters was in Hefei, and a branch was set up in Nanjing.
- In August 2011, the college was reorganized as the "Army Command College". At the same time, the Nanjing Branch became independent again and was restored as the Nanjing Artillery College.
- In 2016, in the military reforms of 2015, the college was transferred from the GSD to the PLAGF.

=== PLA Nanjing Artillery Academy ===
- The Fourth Branch School of the Counter-Japanese Military and Political University evolved in the 1940s into the "Artillery Group of the East China Military and Political University".
- March 1947, the Artillery Group was separated from the university and reformed into the "East China Special Forces Column Technical School", located at Mantangpo, Yishui County, Shandong. The school participated in the Battle of Jinan and the Huaihai campaign.
- In January 1949, it was moved to Jiulishan, Xuzhou City. In May 1949, it was relocated to Yanshan, Nanjing, taking over the original site of the Republic of China's Army Artillery school. In November 1949, the school was raised from regiment to division grade.
- 15 December 1950，the school was renamed the "East China Military Region Artillery School".
- On 10 March 1951, it was renamed "PLA Third Artillery School", and it returned to direct CMC subordination.
- In February 1956, it was renamed the "PLA Nanjing Artillery School".
- In 1957, the school started accepting foreign students.
- December 1969, during the Cultural Revolution, Nanjing Artillery School was abolished.
- In 1974，the "PLA Artillery School" was re-established in Nanjing, reopening in March 1975. It was subordinated to the Artillery Corps of the CMC (in September 1982, the Artillery Corps' HQ was replaced by the Artillery Department of the General Staff).
- At the end of 1977, the school was renamed "PLA First Ground Artillery School"
- July 1986, the school was upgraded to the "PLA Nanjing Artillery Academy" (中国人民解放军南京炮兵学院).
- In 1999, the academy merged with the Hefei Artillery College and the Huai'an Artillery College to become the "Nanjing Branch of the PLA Artillery Academy".

==== Artillery Command College ====
- In May 1955, the CCP Artillery Corps Party Committee established the "Preparatory Committee of the Chinese People's Liberation Army Artillery Academy" in accordance with the instructions of the Central Military Commission on the establishment of military academies.
- On 9 June 1956, the CMC approved Document No. 5, which determined that the new artillery academy would be established based on the Artillery Department of the Nanjing Military Academy. In addition, some key faculty members of the former CMC Artillery School and of the Advanced Artillery School were transferred together with the Artillery College Preparatory Group to form the "PLA Artillery College".
- On 9 July 1957, the Ministry of National Defense officially established the PLA Artillery College. It was under the leadership of the CMC Artillery Corps and was located in Xuanhua Town, Zhangjiakou City, Hebei Province. In August 1957, it was raised to corps grade.
- 19 February 1969, the CMC Administrative Group (军委办事组) issued the "Military Academy Adjustment Plan" that ordered that "all command academies should be abolished". The Artillery College was therefore dissolved on 17 December 1969.
- In January 1970, the Artillery College left behind a caretaking office (留守处) at the site.
- In April 1974, the CMC decided to establish the "Artillery Corps Military and Political Cadres School" at the site of the original Artillery College. On 15 June of the same year, the Artillery Corps issued the order establishing the school at a corps grade.
- On November 28, 1977, the school was renamed back to "PLA Artillery College", still located at Xuanhua.
- On 9 June 1986, in accordance with the CMC Document No. 7 (1986), the Artillery College was renamed the Artillery Command College.
- In 1992, in accordance with the CMC Document No. 9 (1992), the "Reform Plan for the Adjustment of the Establishment System of Military Colleges and Universities", the Artillery Command College was adjusted from an intermediate command college to a primary college and renamed "Xuanhua Artillery College", placed at division grade.
- In June 1993, the General Staff issued an order to restore the Xuanhua Artillery College into the Artillery Command College, at corps grade.
- 2004, the Lanfang Army Missile College was incorporated to the Artillery Command College and became its Lanfang Campus.
  - The predecessor of the Langfang Army Missile College was the Artillery Missile Training Regiment established in November 1978. In April 1979, it was upgraded into the "Artillery Missile Training Base". In June 1983, it was rebuilt into the "Artillery Missile School". In June 1986, it was renamed "Langfang Artillery Missile School". In June 1993, it was renamed the "Langfang Army Missile Academy."
- In November 2011, the Central Military Commission ordered the Artillery Command College and the Nanjing Branch of the Artillery College to merge into the "Nanjing Artillery Academy", at a deputy corps grade. The school was located in Tangshan Town, Jiangning District, Nanjing. On November 5, 2011, the Nanjing Artillery Academy was officially established.
- In 2016, as part of the 2015 reforms, it was transferred from the jurisdiction of the GSD to the PLAGF.

=== Air Defense Corps Academy of the PLA ===
- On 28 September 1949, the "PLA Air Defense School" was established, located in Shenyang City.
- In June 1951, it was renamed the "Anti-aircraft Artillery School". In April 1959, it moved to the site of the former Senior Infantry School in Xiaolingwei, Nanjing. In September 1962, it was reduced in rank and moved to Wuchang, Wuhan, swapping its site with the Artillery Engineering College. The move was completed in August 1962, and the school formally affiliated with the Artillery Corps.
- In September 1969, the Anti-aircraft Artillery School was abolished and a caretaking office was left behind in Wuhan.
- On 21 May 1951, the South Central Military Region, in accordance with orders from the CMC, established the "Fourth Artillery School of the PLA" in Henan Province, with division grade.
- On 4 February 1956, the Ministry of National Defense ordered the Fourth Artillery School to be reformed into the "Zhengzhou Artillery School".
- On 19 February 1969, the Zhengzhou Artillery School was abolished.
- On 1 April 1970, the "PLA Artillery Technical School" was established in Tangshan, Nanjing, by order of the CMC. In November of the same year, it was moved to Zhengzhou, Henan Province, to the site of the Zhengzhou Artillery School. It was set as a division grade school under the leadership of the Artillery Department of the CMC.
- In January 1974, the Artillery Corps reformed the Artillery Technical School to the "Anti-aircraft Artillery School", set at division grade.
- In July 1986 the Anti-aircraft Artillery School was promoted to the "Anti-aircraft Artillery Academy", which was responsible for training junior command officers of the army anti-aircraft artillery units and foreign military students.
- In 1999, it was renamed the "Zhengzhou Air Defense Force Academy".
- In May 2004, according to the order of the Central Military Commission, the "Air Defense Force Command College" of the People's Liberation Army was established by merging the Zhengzhou Air Defense Force Academy with the air defense majors of the Artillery Command College and the Langfang Army Missile College. It was established as an intermediate-level vocational education institution and upgraded from division grade to deputy corps grade.
- In September 2011, the Air Defense Command College was renamed "Air Defense Academy" (中国人民解放军防空兵学院).
- In 2016, as part of the 2015 reforms, it was transferred from the jurisdiction of the GSD to the PLAGF.

=== PLA Army Academy of Artillery and Air Defense ===
- In 2017, in the process of carrying out the 2015 reforms, the "People's Liberation Army Army Artillery and Air Defense Academy" was established by merging the Army Artillery Command College, the Nanjing Artillery Academy, the Air Defense Academy, and the Shenyang Artillery Academy into the People's Liberation Army Army Academy of Artillery and Air Defense, with a deputy corps grade. The headquarters was located in Hefei City. On 8 August 2017, the unveiling ceremony of the Artillery and Air Defense Academy was held in Hefei.

== Facilities ==
Overall, the academy covers 14,000 acres (5,700 ha) (84,798 mu), including 560 acres (230 ha) (3,400 mu) for the main campus; 8,200 acres (3,300 ha) (49,600 mu) for a field-combat-oriented comprehensive training base (野战化综合军事训练基地). The academy has 3.8 hectares (9.4 acres) of built teaching and living infrastructure; and 3,500 square kilometres (1,400 sq mi) of available flying space (飞行空域).

The college has complete teaching and training facilities, including 366 classrooms, 193 laboratories (and special training rooms), 93 training venues, and four libraries with a total area of 50,000 square meters and a collection of more than 1.3 million books. It has two military-level (provincial and ministerial-level) key laboratories and 4 provincial-level experimental training demonstration centers.

The Nanjing campus is adjacent to the largest artillery range in Asia, the Tangshan Shooting Range (汤山炮兵靶场), which allows the use of live ammunition. There are also several combat physical and professional skills training grounds, an artillery field simulation shooting range, and an artillery simulation training center. The Artillery Field Training Center provides training in physical fitness, professional skills and tactical training.

The Zhengzhou Campus has a military basic comprehensive training grounds, weapons and equipment comprehensive training grounds, portable air defense missile training grounds (便携式防空导弹训练场), and individual tactics and communication training grounds. There are four professional technical training grounds (专业技术训练场) outside of campus for air defense weapons operation, ground-to-air training, and general tactical training needs.

There are 23 training grounds in the NCO School. There are more than 165 acres (67 ha) (1,000 mu) of comprehensive training grounds in Kaiyuan, Liaoning Province and more than 3,300 acres (1,300 ha) (20,000 mu) of training bases in Arong Banner, Inner Mongolia.

The academy has cooperative programs with many universities and research institutions, such as its neighboring University of Science and Technology of China in Hefei, and the Chinese Academy of Science.

As of 2018, there were more than 400 serving military students from more than 30 countries being trained in the school. The school conducts student exchanges regularly.

== Organizational structure ==
=== Campuses and schools ===
There are four campuses, corresponding to the four founding institutions.

- The main campus is the Hefei campus, the former Army Command College.
- The Nanjing campus, the former Nanjing Artillery Academy.
- The Zhengzhou campus, the former Air Defense Corps Academy of the PLA.
- The Shenyang campus houses the subordinate NCO School.

=== Academic departments ===
The following five academic departments (系) can be identified:

- Artillery Subunit Command Department (炮兵分队指挥系)
- Antitank Missile Subunit Command Department (反坦克导弹分队指挥系)
- Air Defense Missile Technology and Command Department (防空导弹技术与指挥系)
- Air Defense Force Support Specialty Subunit Command Department (防空兵保障专业分队指挥系)
- Missile and Artillery Integrated Weapons Technology and Command Department (弹炮一体武器技术与指挥系)

=== Key labs ===
The academy has three key labs (重点实验室):

- One unidentified National Defense Science Key Lab (国防科技重点实验室)
- Two unidentified Corps-level (Provincial Ministry-level) Key Labs (军队级 (省部级) 重点实验室)
- The academy has 3 postdoctoral research stations.

== Majors and specialties ==
At the time of the first incoming class in 2017, the academy had the following specialties, each with several possible "directions" (corresponding roughly to the overall major).

- Mechanical Engineering (机械工程)
  - Artillery Subunit Command
- Measurement & Control Technology & Instruments (测控技术与仪器)
  - Artillery Support Specialty Subunit Command
- Electrical Engineering & Automation (电气工程及其自动化)
  - Artillery Subunit Command (炮兵分队指挥)
- Communications Engineering (通信工程)
  - Artillery Support Specialty Subunit Command
  - Air Defense Force Support Specialty Subunit Command
- Optoelectronic Information Science & Engineering (光电信息科学与工程)
  - Artillery Subunit Command
  - Air Defense Force Support Specialty Subunit Command
- Information Engineering (信息工程)
  - Artillery Subunit Command
  - Air Defense Missile Technology & Command
- Computer Science & Technology (计算机科学与技术)
  - Artillery Subunit Command 炮兵分队指挥
  - Antiaircraft Artillery Subunit Command
- Weapon Systems & Engineering (武器系统与工程)
  - Artillery Subunit Command 炮兵分队指挥
  - Antitank Missile Subunit Command
  - Missile and Artillery Integrated Weapons Technology & Command
- Munition Engineering & Explosives Technology (弹药工程与爆炸技术)
  - Missile and Artillery Integrated Weapons Technology & Command
- Fire Power Command & Control Engineering (火力指挥与控制工程)
  - Artillery Subunit Command (炮兵分队指挥)
  - Antiaircraft Artillery Subunit Command (高炮分队指挥)
  - Air Defense Missile Technology & Command
  - Antitank Missile Subunit Command
- Unmanned System Engineering (无人系统工程)
  - Artillery Support Specialty Subunit Command
- Command Information System Engineering (指挥信息系统工程)
  - Artillery Support Specialty Subunit Command
  - Missile and Artillery Integrated Weapons Technology & Command
- Radar Engineering (雷达工程)
  - Air Defense Force Support Specialty Subunit Command
  - Air Defense Missile Technology & Command
- Missile Engineering (导弹工程)
  - Air Defense Missile Technology & Command
  - Antitank Missile Subunit Command

There are a total of 15 undergraduate majors.

=== Graduate School ===
- There is one doctoral degree on a first-level discipline, nine master's degrees on first-level disciplines, nine professional master's degree, covering the four major disciplinary areas of military science, engineering, science, and management; four disciplines and majors have been classified as "key disciplines and majors of the 2110 Project".

== Leadership ==
=== PLA Army Command College ===
Principal

- Yin Gong (尹珙) (1978—?)
- Zheng Lizhong (郑立中) (?—?)
- Zhou Fang (周放) Maj Gen (?—?)
- Liu Mingjun (刘明君) Maj Gen (?—?)
- Hua Zeqing (华泽清) Maj Gen (1989–1991)
- Hu Yongfeng (胡永丰) Maj Gen (?—?)
- Cao Bingjin (曹秉晋) Maj Gen (?—Feb 1999)
- Ren Fuxing (任富兴) Maj Gen (Jun 1999–2010)
- Wu Xiang (吴翔) Maj Gen (2010—Nov 2011，炮兵学院院长；Nov 2011—2015，陆军军官学院院长)
- Xu Yongxiang (许永祥) Maj Gen (Jul 2015–2017)

Political commissar

- Liang Bincheng (梁彬成) (1978–1985)
- Li Zhenhua (李振华) (Jul 1985—Aug 1988)
- Wang Guiqin (汪贵勤) Maj Gen (?—?)
- Luo Jingzhong (罗景中) Maj Gen (?—?)
- Yang Yeli (杨业利) Maj Gen (?—?)
- Zhang Langui (张兰贵) Maj Gen (2005–2009)
- Zhang Zhihui (张志辉) Maj Gen (Jan 2009—May 2010)
- Li Yongsheng (李永生) Maj Gen (2010—Nov 2011，炮兵学院政治委员；Nov 2011—2013，陆军军官学院政治委员)
- Fang Jun (方军) Sr Col (Dec 2013—Nov 2014)
- Wang Baojun (王保军) Maj Gen (201411月—2017，陆军军官学院政治委员)

=== Nanjing Artillery College ===
Principal

- Chen Ruiting (陈锐霆) (1947—?)
- Sun Shuping (孙叔平) (?—Apr 1949)
- Chen Ruiting (陈锐霆) (1949–1952)
- Han Yifu (汉一夫) Sr Col (1952–1957)
- Jin Hu (靳虎) Sr Col (?—?)
- Yao Ke (姚克) Sr Col (?—1965)
- Wang Fengge (王锋戈) (?—?)
- Jiang Yongxing (姜永兴) (1998–2002)
- Huang Jianwei (黄建伟) (2002—Jul 2003)
- Wu Xiang (吴翔) (Jul 2003–2010)
- Xu Yongxiang (许永祥) (2010–2011)

- Chen Xilian (陈锡联) Sr Gen (Sep 1957—Oct 1959)
- Gao Cunxin (高存信) Maj Gen (Jun 1960—Dec 1969)
- Du Jianhua (杜剑华) (Sep 1975—Jan 1978)
- Wang Xiyuan (王西原) (Jan 1978—Jun 1983)
- Yang Xiaoming (杨晓明) (Jun 1983—Nov 1986)
- Qi Wuzheng (戚务政) (Nov 1986—Aug 1988)
- Zhang Xuezhen (张学箴) Maj Gen (Aug 1988—Dec 1991)
- Xu Naihui (徐乃辉) Maj Gen (Feb 1991—Sep 1992)
- Lei Chaomin (雷焯民) Maj Gen (Sep 1992—?)
- ? Maj Gen (?—?)
- Guo Dehua (郭德华) Maj Gen (Dec 1999–2002)
- Cao Shuxin (曹淑信) Maj Gen (Oct 2002–2009)
- Zhang Shude (张树德) Maj Gen (2009–2011)

- Zhang Shude (张树德) Maj Gen (Nov 2011–2013)
- Yu Chao (于超) Maj Gen (2013–2017)

Political commissar

- Zhang Fan (张藩) (1947—?)
- Xia Qi (夏琦) (1952–1963)
- Xiong Zhisheng (熊志生) (?—?)
- Zhang Yiwei (张益炜) (?—?)
- Qi Jian (齐键) (?—?)
- Bu Lianpeng (卜连鹏) (?—?)
- Ma Yuhu (马玉虎) (?—2011)

- Chen Xilian (陈锡联) Sr Gen (Sep 1957—Oct 1959)
- Liu Chun (刘春) Maj Gen (Sep 1957—Dec 1958，炮兵学院副政治委员主持工作)
- Xie Liang (谢良) Maj Gen (Jun 1959—Feb 1965)
- Liu Youguang (刘友光) Maj Gen (Feb 1965—Oct 1965)
- Zhang Ying (张英) (Oct 1965—Dec 1969)
- Gao Feng (高烽) (Sep 1975—Oct 1978)
- Liao Dinglin (廖鼎琳) (Oct 1978—Jun 1982)
- Wang Deguang (王德光) (May 1984—Nov 1986)
- Qi Jian (齐键) Maj Gen (Nov 1986—Jun 1990)
- Wang Jiangsong (王江松) Maj Gen (Jun 1990—Sep 1992)
- Yu Juchu (俞菊初) Maj Gen (Sep 1992—?)
- Yin Baohong (殷宝洪) Maj Gen (?—1997)
- ? Maj Gen (1997—1999，炮兵指挥学院政治委员)
- Liu Deming (刘德明) Maj Gen (Jun 1999–2003)
- Xu Ligui (徐立贵) Maj Gen (2003–2008)
- Su Shubo (苏树波) Maj Gen (2008–2011)
- Ma Yuhu (马玉虎) Maj Gen (2011—Nov 2011)

- Ma Yuhu (马玉虎) Maj Gen (Nov 2011–2013)
- Zhou Zhengguang (周争光) Maj Gen (2013–2015)
- Zeng Qin (曾勤) Maj Gen (2015–2017)

=== PLA Air Defense Academy ===
Principal

- Jia Tao (贾陶) (Sep 1949—May 1951)
- Jiang Hong (江洪) Sr Col (?—?)
- Yin Gong (尹珙) Sr Col (?—?)
- Wang Xiyuan (王西原) (?—1969)

- Zhang Zhiyi (张志毅) (1951—?)
- Ge Haizhou (葛海洲) Sr Col (?—?)
- Liu Defu (刘德夫) Sr Col (?—1961)
- He Jinheng (贺进恒) Sr Col (Oct 1962—Dec 1964)

- Wang Guiqin (汪贵勤) (?—?)
- Xu Naihui (徐乃辉) Sr Col (?—?)
- Huang Guanqing (黄关庆) Sr Col (Oct 1995—1999，高炮学院院长；1999—?，郑州防空兵学院院长)
- Liu Xianhua (刘现华) Maj Gen (2005—Dec 2009)
- Fang Beiqun (方北群) Maj Gen (Dec 2009–2013)
- Zhao Tianxiang (赵天翔) Maj Gen (2013–2017)

Political commissar

- Wang Fengwu (王凤梧) (1949—?)
- Zhang Ying (张英) Sr Col (1952–1960)
- Liu Ping (刘平) (?—?)
- Gao Feng (高峰) (?—1969)

- Zhang Zhiyi (张志毅) (1951—?)
- Leng Bing (冷冰) (?—?)
- Cheng Wenjie (程文杰) Sr Col (?—?，郑州炮兵学校政治委员)
- Li Yousan (李友三) (?—?)
- Shi Enrong (史恩荣) (?—?)

- Liu Cuixun (刘萃勲) (?—?)
- Xie Zewen (解泽文) Sr Col (?—?)
- Wei Fazhou (卫发洲) Maj Gen (?—?)
- Zhang Xuncai (张训彩) Maj Gen (2005–2008)
- Wang Minggui (王明贵) Maj Gen (2008–2010)
- Qiu Zuping (邱祖平) Maj Gen (2010—Jan 2014)
- Han Ruicheng (韩瑞成) Maj Gen (Jan 2014–2017)

=== PLA Army Academy of Artillery and Air Defense ===
Principal

- Zhao Tianxiang (赵天翔) Maj Gen (2017–2021)
- Cai Hongwei (蔡宏伟) Maj Gen (2021—)

Political Commissar

- Wang Zhi'an (王志安) Sr Col (2017–2020)
- Feng Yi (冯奕) Maj Gen (2020—)

== See also ==
- Academic institutions of the armed forces of China
