= Air Force Communication NCO Academy =

Military academy in China

- 中国人民解放军空军通信士官学校
- Type: Military academy
- Established: October 8, 1986; 40 years ago
- Affiliations: People's Liberation Army Air Force
- Location: Dalian, Liaoning, China; 39.0664°N 121.738°E
- Campus: 73.33 hectares (181.2 acres) (1,100 mu)
- Location within China

The People's Liberation Army Air Force Communication NCO School (MOE Code: 91032) is a PLAAF military academy in Dalian, Liaoning, that trains non-commissioned officers (NCO) in communication tasks. It is a division leader grade unit.

== History ==
- In October 1986, the "PLAAF Dalian NCO School" was established by merging the communication teaching team and political work teaching team of the Shenyang Military Region. It was a brigade leader grade unit subordinated to the Shenyang Military Region's Air Force. The Dalian School was one of the first two non-commissioned officer schools established by the People's Liberation Army. When it was established, it was the school with the lowest grade and most basic training level in the PLA. The establishment ceremony was held on 8 October 1986.
- In 2017, as part of the deepening national defense and military reform process, it was reorganized as the Air Force Communication NCO School.

== Campus ==
The school covers an area of more than 73 hectares (180 acres) (1100 mu). It includes a team construction theory research center, and the PLAAF's first "simulated airport", in addition to normal types of teaching, training, and living facilities.

== Organization ==
=== Academic departments ===
As of 2012, the academy had five departments:

- Radio Navigation
- Command Automation and Satellite Communications
- Radio Communications
- Wired Radio Communications
- Student Military Training

The school has at least 13 teaching and research labs. The school encourages cadet research and technical projects.

Students are organized into 10 student teams, each probably at battalion grade.

== Programs ==
The school grants two-year secondary technical or a three-year post-secondary degrees for junior NCO. The three-year program includes two years at the academy and one more year of practice at an operational unit.

In 2012, there were at least 20 three-year course specialties, with specialty groups being communications, navigation, and command and control.

In 2012, the academy had 2,440 students: 1,360 NCO students, 640 technical soldiers, and 440 NCOs receiving promotion training. At that time, it had already had graduated 17,000 students (averaging 650 per year since 1986). The cadets are likely corporals or sergeants.

== Staff ==
In 2012, the academy had a total of 452 staff cadres, including 270 instructors, and 73 civilian personnel.

== Leadership ==
Director

- Cheng Zhixiang (承志祥) (1986 – ?)
- Zhang Gongliang (张公良) (? – ?)
- Zhang Jun (张军) (? – ?)
- Wang Zhongjiang (王忠江) (? – )

Political commissar

- Liu Yuhai (刘玉海) (1986 – ?)
- Yin Yanguang (尹燕广) (? – 2012)
- Pan Hengwei (潘恒卫) (2012 – )

== See also ==
Academic institutions of the armed forces of China
