= Army Aviation Academy =

Chinese military academy

PLA Army Aviation Academy
- 中国人民解放军陆军航空兵学院
- Logo of the Army Aviation Academy
- Type: Military academy
- Established: 1999; 27 years ago
- Parent institution: PLAGF
- Students: 2,000
- Location: Beijing, China; 39°50′06″N 116°38′51″E
- Campus: 35 ha (86 acres); Suburban

Army Aviation Academy (Beijing)

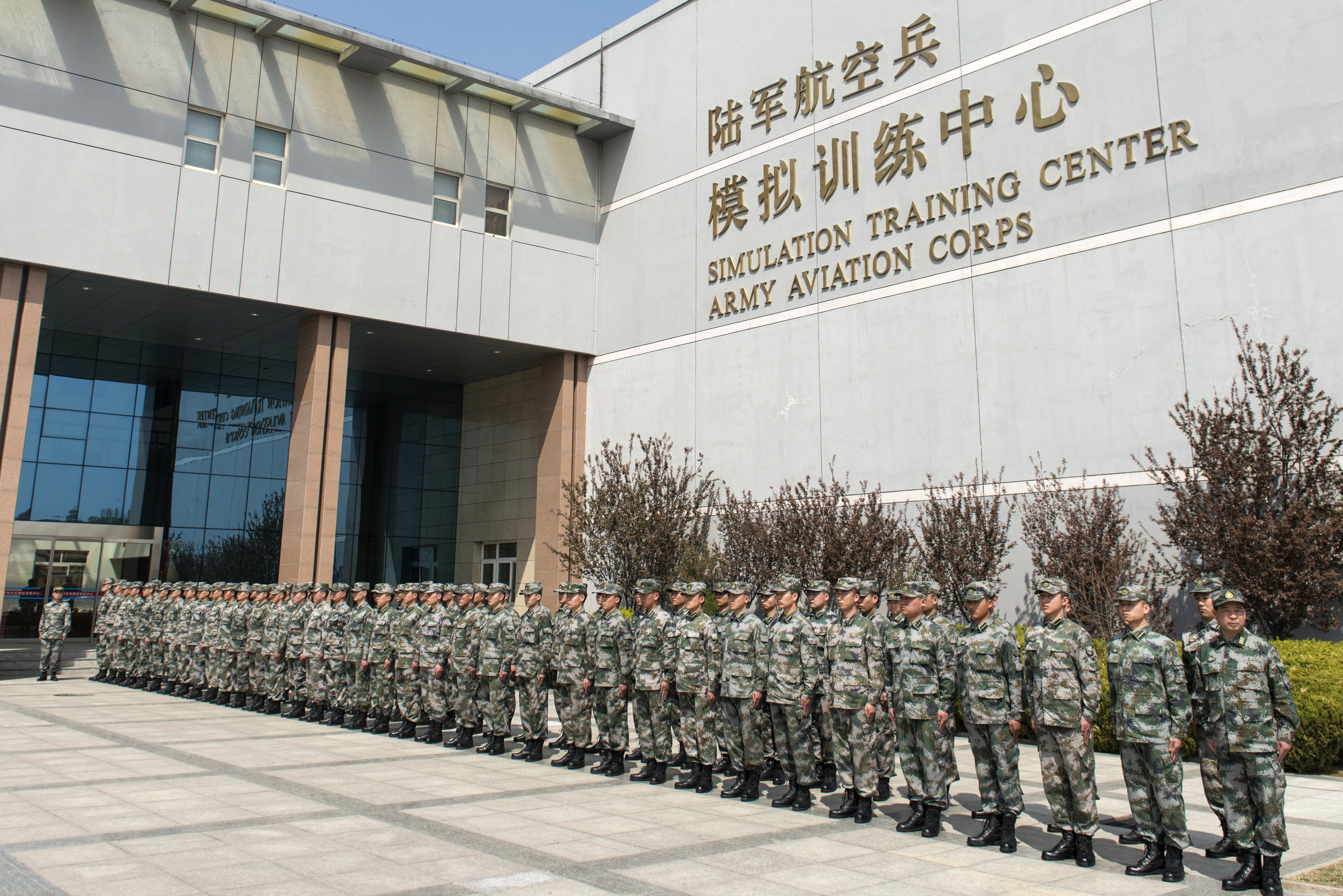
Simulation Training Center Army Aviation Academy

The People's Liberation Ground Force Army Aviation Academy normally called the Army Aviation Academy (MOE: 91010) is the main officer and NCO training establishment of the Chinese PLA Army Aviation, and provides helicopter training to the PLAAF, PLAN and PAP. It is a deputy-corps grade institution, based in Taihu town, Tongzhou district of Beijing.

== History ==
- The academy was established in 1999 from the merger of three Army Aviation training regiments and one maintenance training regiment, and assigned to the General Staff Department (GSD).
- In March 2001, the Central Military Committee authorized the creation of the academy's campus in Beijing.
- In 2016, the academy was transferred from the GSD to the PLA Army.

== Organization ==
The campus covers an area of 86 acres (520 mu) and is divided into eight (8) functional areas: an administrative and office area, instructional and experimental area, training area, physical fitness and sports area, cadre residential area, cadet residential area, logistics sustainment area and open house area. The academy has multiple locations, the main training programs offered are aviation instruction (air services), and ground instruction (ground services), which incorporate command, flight, and aircraft maintenance studies. In 2006, the academy started to enroll high school graduates.

In 2015, the Army Aviation Academy had the following departments:

- Basic department
- Flight theory department
- Command department
- Helicopter mechanical engineering department
- Helicopter airborne equipment department

it granted the following 4-year academic degrees:

- Aircraft Engine Engineering
- Aerospace Communication and Navigation
- Aircraft Radar Maintenance & Engineering
- Aviation Ordnance Maintenance & Engineering
- Aviation Fire Control System Maintenance & Engineering
- Aeronautical Missile Maintenance & Engineering
- Avionics Maintenance Engineering
- Airborne Communications and Navigation

and had a total of 19 vocational specialties, including:

- Aviation Corps Field Command
- Flight and Command
- Flight Vehicle Systems Engineering
- Electrical Engineering and Automation
- Navigation Engineering
- Arms Engineering

== Leadership ==
Director

1. Hao Zhengli (郝政利) Lt Gen（1999年—2009年）
2. Tao Bilan (陶炳兰) Lt Gen（2009年—2014年）
3. Li Dexiu (李德修) Lt Gen（2014—2018）
4. Huang Kechao (黄克超) Lt Gen（2018—）

Political Commissar

1. Wang Xiaoqing (王晓青) Lt Gen（？—2011）
2. Hu Dengqiang (胡登强) Lt Gen（2011—2015）
3. Zhang Dehui (张德辉) Lt Gen（2015—）

== See also ==
Academic institutions of the armed forces of China
