= Rocket Force NCO School =

PLA Academy

PLA Rocket Force NCO School (中国人民解放军火箭军士官学校)
- Logo of the Rocket Force NCO School
- Type: Military academy
- Established: 2017
- Affiliation: PLA Rocket Force
- Location: Qingzhou City, Weifang, Shandong Province, China

The People's Liberation Army Rocket Force Non-Commissioned Officers School, usually called the Rocket Force NCO School, is a military specialist academy of division grade under the PLARF, responsible for the training of NCOs for the force. It is located in Weifang Prefecture, Shandong.

== History ==
- The school was founded in 1970 in Yunnan Province as the 814th Regiment of the Second Artillery Force.
- In 1971, the regiment was moved to Shaanxi Province, and became part of the Second Artillery Engineering College.
- In 1976, it reformed as the Secondary Artillery Training Regiment and moved to the Second Artillery Command College in Wuhan City, Hubei Province.
- In 1978, the regiment moved to its present location in Qingzhou City, Shandong Province.
- Beginning in 1986, the regiment started training PLARF NCOs.
- In 1993, the regiment reformed as the Qingzhou Branch of the Second Artillery Command College.
- In 1999, the regiment reformed as Qingzhou Second Artillery NCO School.
- In 2011, the school was renamed the Second Artillery NCO Vocational and Technical Education College.
- In 2017, the college was reformed as the Rocket Force NCO School.

== Organization ==
=== Academic departments ===
- Nuclear Missiles Department
- Conventional Missiles Department
- Communications Department
- Engineering Department

== Leadership ==
Second Artillery Qingzhou NCO School

Director

- Cui Zhenghua (崔正华) Sr Col（？—？）
- Zhu Ping (朱平) 专业技术少将（？—？）
- Li Yuchao (李玉超) Sr Col（？—2011年）

Political Commissar

- Li Guoru (黎国如) Sr Col（？—？）
- Ding Zhaojun (丁兆军) Sr Col（？—？）
- Wei Yun (卫云) Sr Col（？—？）
- Xue Baoguo (薛保国) Sr Col（？—2011年）

Second Artillery Vocational and Engineering Education College

Director

- Wang Liyan (王立岩) Lt Gen（2011—2012）
- Li Hua Sr Col（2012—2016）

Political Commissar

- Xu Guoming (徐国明) Sr Col（2011—2016）

PLARF Engineering University Vocational and Engineering Education College

Director

- Li Hua (李华) Sr Col（2016—2016）

Political Commissar

- Xu Guoming (徐国明) Sr Col（2016—2016）

PLARF Engineering University NCO College

Commander

- Li Hua (李华) Sr Col（2016—2017）

Political Commissar

- Xu Guoming (徐国明) Sr Col（2016—2017）

Rocket Force NCO School

Director

- Li Hua (李华)

Political Commisssar

- Ning Luqiao (宁路桥)

== See also ==
- Academic institutions of the armed forces of China
