= Qi Zhongheng =

Chinese general

- 齐仲亨

Political Commissar of the PLA Second Artillery Engineering University
- In office June 1983 – April 1990
- President: Fu Beichi
- Preceded by: Su Can
- Succeeded by: Gao Tongsheng

Personal details
- Born: 1928 Ding County, Hebei, China
- Died: 2004 (aged 75–76) Xi'an, Shaanxi, China
- Party: Chinese Communist Party
- Education: Counter-Japanese Military and Political University

Military service
- Allegiance: People's Republic of China
- Branch/service: People's Liberation Army Ground Force
- Years of service: 1941–1990
- Rank: Lieutenant general
- Battles/wars: Chinese Civil War

Chinese name
- Simplified Chinese: 齐仲亨
- Traditional Chinese: 齊仲亨
Transcriptions
Standard Mandarin
- Hanyu Pinyin: Qí Zhònghēng

Qi Zhongheng (Chinese: 齐仲亨; 1928 – 4 December 2004) was a lieutenant general in the People's Liberation Army of China.

== Biography ==
Qi was born in Ding County (now Dingzhou), Hebei, in 1928.

He enlisted in the Eighth Route Army in March 1941, and joined the Chinese Communist Party (CCP) in June 1943. He graduated from the Counter-Japanese Military and Political University. After the founding of the Communist State, he successively served in the Shenyang Artillery School, Second Artillery Command Academy, and Second Artillery Technical Academy. In June 1983, he was promoted to become political commissar of the PLA Second Artillery Engineering University (now PLA Rocket Force University of Engineering), a position he held until April 1990. He attained the rank of lieutenant general (zhongjiang) in September 1988.

On 4 December 2004, he died from an illness in Xi'an, Shaanxi, at the age of 76.

Military offices
Preceded by Su Can	Political Commissar of the PLA Second Artillery Engineering University; 1983–1990	Succeeded by Gao Tongsheng
