= Army Infantry College of the PLA =

Military Academy of China

- 中国人民解放军陆军步兵学院
- Logo of the Army Infantry College of the PLA
- Type: Military Academy
- Established: August 1, 2017; 8 years ago
- Principal: Xu Jinhua
- Location: No 2001 Changzhengxi Road, Xinjian District, Nanchang City, Jiangxi Province, China; 28.673454°N 115.780230°E
- Location in China

The Army Infantry College of the PLA is a deputy corps grade military education institution directly under the PLAGF, located in Nanchang city in Jiangxi province. It is tasked with training new junior command officers, staff officers, graduate students of military science, and foreign command and staff officers. It was formed in 2017 by merging two existing infantry academies.

== History ==
The Army Infantry College is the result of the 2017 merger between two institutions, the Nanchang Army Academy and the Shijiazhuang Mechanized Infantry Academy. A third entity, the Yuanzhi Branch of the Shijiazhuang Army Command Academy, had joined slightly before. The institutional lineage is as follows:

=== PLA Nanchang Army Academy (中国人民解放军南昌陆军学院) ===
- On 12 August 1949, the Jiangxi Branch of the Military and Political University of China was established, with its campus located in Wangchenggang, Nanchang City, Jiangxi Province.
- In January 1950, the branch is renamed "South-Central Military and Political University's Jiangxi Branch Campus"
- In August 1950 it is renamed "South-Central Military and Political University's 4th Branch Campus".
- On 13 March 1951, the branch campus was given separate independence, established as the "PLA 23rd Infantry School", a corps grade unit.
- In 1952, the 23rd Infantry School, the Training Service of the Third Air Defense School of East China, and the teaching battalion of the Fourth Army were merged to establish the "PLA Air Defense School". In September 1958, the Air Defense School merged with the Air Force Radar School.
- In 1953, a different section of the 23rd Infantry School set up the "PLA South-Central Military Region Normal School".
- In 1955, the school was renamed "PLA Guangzhou Military Region 3rd Cultural Normal School"
- In May 1955, the Normal School was renamed "PLA Nanchang Infantry School", assigned to the Nanjing Military Region. In 1960 it was returned to the Fuzhou Military Region.
- In January 1963, renamed "PLA Fuzhou Military Region Infantry School"
- In 1968, During the Cultural Revolution, the Fuzhou Military Region Infantry School was dissolved.
- In February 1974, the "PLA Fuzhou Military Region Political Cadres School" was established at the same Wangchenggang site of the old Infantry School.
- In January 1978, the Cadres School was renamed "PLA Fuzhou Military Region Infantry School", completing its restoration.
- In December 1984, the school was renamed "PLA Nanchang Army School"
- In 1985, it was transferred to the Nanjing Military Region.
- On 6 September 1986, the school was promoted into the "PLA Nanchang Army Academy". In 1992 it was demoted to division grade.
- In 1994, Jiang Zemin wrote an inscription for the 45th anniversary of the founding of the academy: "To build a modernized and regularized revolutionary army, let's train a large number of qualified talent".
- At the end of 2015, as part of the military reforms, the academy was transferred from the (abolished) Nanjing Military Region to the direct control of the PLAGF.

=== PLA Shijiazhuang Mechanized Infantry Academy (中国人民解放军石家庄机械化步兵学院) ===
- On March 5, 1951, in accordance with the first "National Military School and Troop Training Conference", and the People's Revolutionary Military Commission instructions on the reorganization of major military regions and their branches into infantry schools, the General Staff issued a document ordering all major military and political universities to be renamed "PLA Advanced Infantry Schools" and all branches to be renamed "PLA Infantry Schools", all while reducing the total number of schools. In this reorganization, the North China Military and Political University was renamed the Sixth Advanced Infantry School; the Huolu Branch of the North China Military and Political University and the 67th Army Headquarters were rebuilt into the "32nd Infantry School".
- On 23 June 1952, the Central Military Commission issued the "Order on Adjusting the National Military Academies", and the 32nd School was renamed "Ninth Infantry School" and moved to Shijiazhuang City, Hebei Province.
- On May 30, 1955, the Ministry of Defense ordered infantry schools to use toponymic names. The school changed its name to "PLA Shijiazhuang Infantry School".
- In September 1962, according to the circular No. 363 issued by the PLA General Staff, infantry schools were renamed according to their military region. The school changed its name to "Beijing Military Region Infantry School".
- In 1969, during the Cultural Revolution, the Beijing Military Region Infantry School was abolished.
- In 1977, the Beijing Military Region Infantry School was re-established.
- In December 1980, the school was renamed the "Shijiazhuang Army School".
- In June 1986, the school was promoted into the "Shijiazhuang Army Academy".
- In May 2004, the Shijiazhuang Army Academy and the Yuanzhi Branch of the Shijiazhuang Army Command Academy merged to form the "PLA Shijiazhuang Mechanized Infantry Academy", intended to be a junior talent training base, and a theoretical research center for the Army's Mechanized Infantry. Deputy corps grade. The academy did not accept gaokao students, only serving officers.
- In 2015, as part of the 2015 reforms, the academy was transferred from the (abolished) Beijing Military Region to the direct jurisdiction of the PLAGF.

=== PLA Armored Forces Academy (中国人民解放军装甲兵学院) ===
- In April 1955, the Central Military Commission commanded that an "Armored Forces Academy" should be established based on the Armored Forces Department of the Nanjing Military Academy. In August 1955, the Ministry of National Defense instructed the Armored Corps of the Military Commission to be responsible for the establishment of the academy.
- On 26 May 1958, the Ministry of National Defense ordered the formation of a corps grade armored forces academy in Datong, Shanxi, based on the Armored Corps Department of the Military Academy. On June 1, 1958, the "PLA Armored Forces Academy" was officially established, which is the first armored forces' higher education institution of the PLA, located in Datong City, Shanxi Province. Xu Guangda served as president and political commissar.
- On 5 March 1959, the establishment ceremony for the Armored Forces Academy takes place.
- On 17 February 1969 during the Cultural Revolution, the Armored Forces Academy is dissolved.
- On September 1, 1975, the "PLA Armored Forces Political Cadres School" was established in Yuanshi County, Hebei Province. Corps grade.
- On January 12, 1978, school was upgraded to "The Chinese People's Liberation Army Armored Forces Academy". Full army grade. On 3 May 1983, it was reduced to corps grade.
- On 9 June 1986, it was renamed "PLA Armored Forces Command School", and placed directly under the command of the General Staff Department. Corps grade.
- On 26 August 1992, the School was demoted to "PLA Armored Forces College". Division grade.
- On 3 June 1993, promoted to "Armored Forces Command Academy". Deputy corps grade.
- In July 1999, Jiang Zemin ordered the merger of the Armored Corps Command Academy and the Army Staff Academy to form the "Shijiazhuang Army Command Academy". Included in the reform, the Armored Forces Command College was converted into the Yuanshi Branch of the Shijiazhuang Army Command Academy.

=== Army Infantry College of the PLA (中国人民解放军陆军步兵学院) ===
- In 2017, as part of the 2015 Reforms, the Nanchang Army Academy and the Shijiazhuang Mechanized Infantry Academy were merged to form the Army Infantry College of the PLA. The headquarters of the academy was located in Nanchang City, and the secondary campus in Shijiazhuang. On August 1, 2017, the establishment ceremony of the academy was held in Nanchang. On the same day, the Shijiazhuang campus held a nameplate unveiling ceremony.

== Majors and Specialties ==
The school is responsible for the training of junior-level commanding officers, combined arms battalion staff officers, Military Science graduate students, as well as foreign company and platoon-level command and staff officers. As of 2017, the following degrees or specialties were offered.

=== Associate Specialties ===
The college trains NCO in 2-3 year courses.

=== Bachelor specialties ===
As of 2017, there were four undergraduate specialties, subdivided into "specialty directions":

- Combat Command (作战指挥):
  - Command of Motorized Infantry Units (摩托化步兵分队指挥)
  - Command of Mountain Infantry Units (山地步兵分队指挥)
  - Command of Guard and Service Units (警卫勤务分队指挥)
  - Command of Mechanized Infantry Battalion Artillery Units (机械化步兵营属炮兵分队指挥)
- Command Information Systems Engineering (指挥信息系统工程):
  - Command of Air Assault Units (空中突击步兵分队指挥)
  - Command of Light High Mobility Infantry Units (轻型高机动步兵分队指挥)
- Armored Vehicle Engineering (装甲车辆工程):
  - Command of Armored Infantry Units (装甲步兵分队指挥)
  - Command of Mechanized Infantry Reconnaissance Units (机械化步兵侦察分队指挥)
- Weapon Systems and Engineering (武器系统与工程):
  - Command of Motorized Infantry Units Artillery Detachments (摩托化步兵营属炮兵分队指挥)

=== Master's Specialties ===
There are two master's degree majors:

- Military Command (军事指挥)
- Military Equipment (军事装备)

== Campus ==
The main campus is in Nanchang. This campus is 19,600 mu -1,307 hectares (3,230 acres), plus 40 external training sites.：

== Leadership ==
=== PLA Nanchang Army College (中国人民解放军南昌陆军学院) ===
Directors

- Chen Jihan (陈奇涵) (Sep 1949—Oct 1950)
- Li Zibin (李梓斌) (Oct 1950—Dec 1951)
- Li Min (李敏) (Dec 1951–1952)
- Wang Zhitai (王智涛) (1952—Nov 1954)
- Yan Xia (阎遐) (?—?，中南军区师范学校校长)
- Jiao Hongguang (焦红光) (?—?)
- Li Guanghui (李光辉) Maj Gen (Aug 1955—Dec 1960)
- Xu Guangyou徐光友 Maj Gen (Dec 1960–1968)
- Wang Linde王林德 (May 1975—May 1983)
- Wang Chengbin王成斌 (May 1983—Oct 1986)
- Zhang Zhaoxun章昭薰 (Oct 1986—Aug 1988)
- Li Peiji (李培基) Maj Gen (Aug 1988—May 1990)
- Chen Bingde (陈炳德) Maj Gen (May 1990—Sep 1992)
- Xu Zhilong (许志龙) Maj Gen (Sep 1992—Mar 1998)
- Li Zenglin (李增林) Maj Gen (Mar 1998—Jul 2002)
- Chen Dongxiang (陈东祥) Maj Gen (Jul 2002—Jany 2009)
- Xue Benping (薛本平) Maj Gen (Jan 2009–2010)
- Huang Xingbing (黄新炳) Sr Col(2010–2017) Huang Xinbing

Political Commissars

- Chen Zhengren (陈正人) (Nov 1949—Oct 1950)
- Pan Taocai (潘寿才) Maj Gen (Oct 1950—Aug 1957)
- Jiao Hongguang (焦红光) (?—?)
- Xu Juncheng (许军成) Sr Col (Aug 1955—Apr 1964)
- Dong Chao (董超) (May 1975—Oct 1986)
- Yang Linxiong (杨林雄) Maj Gen (Oct 1986—Sep 1992)
- Pan Ruiji (潘瑞吉) Maj Gen (Sep 1992—Dec 1994)
- Dai Yufu (戴玉富) Maj Gen (Dec 1994—Apr 2001)
- Zhang Huahan (张华汉) Maj Gen (Apr 2001—Jul 2003)
- Yan Xiaoning (颜晓宁) Maj Gen (Jul 2003–2010)
- Li Hong (李弘) Sr Col (2010–2015)
- Hua Enhua (黄恩华) Sr Col (2015–2017)

=== PLA Shijiazhuang Mechanized Infantry Academy ===
PLA Shijiazhuang Army Academy (中国人民解放军石家庄陆军学院)

Directors

- Liu Ang (刘昂) (1951–1952)
- Chen Jinyu (陈金钰) Maj Gen(1952–1960) Chen Jinyu
- Wang Shouren (王壽仁) Sr Col (1960–1964) Wang Shouren
- Chen Lei (陈雷) (1964—？)
- Yuan Jie (袁捷) (1978–1983)
- Li Laizhu (李来柱) (May 1983—Jun 1985)
- Wang Yi (王毅) (1985—？)
- Lu Shengfa (鹿生法) Maj Gen (？—1992)
- Wang Qi (王琪) Maj Gen (Aug 1992—Jul 1999)
- Wang Dingqing (王定庆) Maj Gen (Jul 1999—Jun 2003)
- Wang Jianyin (王建盈) Maj Gen (Jun 2003—May 2004)

Political Commissars

- Zhang Rusan (张如三) (1951—？)
- Yang Yan (杨言) (？—1961)
- Chen Yafu (陈亚夫) Maj Gen(1961–1965) Chen Afu
- Zhan Huanan (展化南) (1965–1969)
- Song Shuanglai (宋双来) (1978–1987) Song Shuanglai
- Li Zongan (李宗安) Maj Gen(Jun 1987—Jun 1990) Li Zongan
- Xiang Xu (向旭) Maj Gen(Jun 1990—Dec 1994)
- Zheng Rongquan (郑荣泉) Maj Gen(Dec 1994—Jul 1999)
- Du Ziwen (杜子文) Maj Gen(Jul 1999—Jun 2002)
- Wei Dongpu (魏东普) Maj Gen(Jun 2002—May 2004)

Shijiazhuang Army Command Academy's Yuanshi Branch Campus 石家庄陆军指挥学院元氏分院

Directors

- Xu Guangda (许光达) Col Gen(Sep 1957—Apr 1961)
- Zhang Wenzhou (张文舟)Maj Gen(Apr 1961—Feb 1964)
- Huang Guxiang (黄鹄显) Maj Gen(Feb 1964—Feb 1969)
- Wang Lin( May 1967—Apr 1968)
- Wang Huanru (王焕如) (Apr 1968—Feb 1969)
- Fu Chunsen (傅蠢僧) (Oct 1975—Nov 1983)
- Zhang Zhongyuan (张重远) (Jun 1983—Aug 1988)
- Guo Hongxiang (郭洪祥) Maj Gen(Aug 1988—Jul 1995)
- Li Xiaojun (李小军) Maj Gen(Jul 1995—Jun 1999)
- Chen Yong (陳勇) Maj Gen Chen Yong (Jun 1999—Jul 2002)
- Lan Jun (兰俊) Maj Gen(Jul 2002—May 2004)

Political Commissars

- Qiu Xiangtian (邱相田) Maj Gen (Dec 1959—Jul 1964)
- Wang Huanru (王焕如) (Aug 1965—Feb 1969)
- Niu Mingzhi (牛明智) (Nov 1975—Feb 1978，Feb 19782—Feb 1979)
- Zhang Dayun (张大军) (Jun 1981—Aug 1982)
- Luo Yang (罗扬) (Jun 1983—Jun 1986)
- Shu Cuiyan (石翠岩) Maj Gen (Nov 1986—Jun 1990)
- Kang Chengren (康成仁) Maj Gen (Jun 1990—Aug 1992)
- Zhao Fengmin (赵凤鸣) Maj Gen (Aug 1992—Aug 1994)
- Tian Yongqing (田永清) Maj Gen (Aug 1994—Oct 1998)
- Li Riming (李日明) Maj Gen (Jun 1999—Jul 20027)
- Yan Yuxian (闫玉贤) Maj Gen (Jul 2002—May 2004)

Shijiazhuang Mechanized Infantry Academy (中国人民解放军石家庄机械化步兵学院)

Directors

- Liu Haigang (刘海刚) Maj Gen(May 2004—Oct 2010)
- Wang Dong (王东) Maj Gen(Oct 2010—Mar 2015)
- Wang Jing (王静) Maj Gen(Mar 2015–2017)

Political Commissars

- Wei Dongpu (魏东普) Maj Gen(May 2004—Feb 2009)
- Li Xijun (李喜群) Maj Gen(Feb 2009–2013) Li Xiqun
- Xu Jianyong (徐建勇) Maj Gen(2013–2015)
- Li Shengting (李胜廷) Lt Gen(2015–2017)

=== Army Infantry Academy of the PLA ===
Director

- Xu Jinhua (徐金华) Maj Gen (2017—)

Political Commissar

- Liu Yong (刘勇) Maj Gen (2017—)

== See also ==
Academic institutions of the armed forces of China
