= Non-commissioned officer school =

Non-commissioned officer school may refer to the following military academies:

- National Active Non-Commissioned Officers School (France)
- Non-commissioned Officer School of the People's Armed Police
