= Liu Zheng =

Chinese general

- 刘铮

Deputy Director of the PLA General Logistics Department
- In office December 2012 – November 2014
- Preceded by: Ding Jiye
- Succeeded by: Zhou Songhe

Personal details
- Born: August 1954 (age 72) Yingkou, Liaoning, China
- Party: Chinese Communist Party
- Education: PLA Rocket Force University of Engineering

Military service
- Allegiance: People's Republic of China
- Branch/service: People's Liberation Army Ground Force
- Rank: Lieutenant general

Chinese name
- Traditional Chinese: 劉錚
- Simplified Chinese: 刘铮
Transcriptions
Standard Mandarin
- Hanyu Pinyin: Liú Zhēng

Liu Zheng (born August 1954) is a retired lieutenant general in the People's Liberation Army of China. He served as Deputy Head of the PLA General Logistics Department. In November 2014 he was placed under investigation by the PLA's anti-corruption agency.

Liu was a member of the 12th National People's Congress.

== Life and career ==
Liu was born and raised in Yingkou, Liaoning. He graduated from PLA Second Artillery Engineering University, majoring in electronics and communication engineering. After college, he was assigned to the PLA General Logistics Department (GLD). Liu obtained the rank of major general in July 2006. In December 2009 he was promoted to become Chief of Staff of the GLD, a position he held until December 2012, while he was promoted again to become Deputy Head of the GLD. He attained the rank of lieutenant-general in August 2014. On January 15, 2015, the People's Liberation Army announced that he has been under investigation since December 2014 for "suspected legal violations".

Military offices
| Preceded by Ding Jiye | Deputy Director of the PLA General Logistics Department; 2012–2014 | Succeeded by Zhou Songhe |
