= Air Force Early Warning Academy =

Military academy in China

- 中国人民解放军空军预警学院
- Other names: Wuhan Radar College
- Type: Military
- Established: 1958
- Parent institution: PLAAF Headquarters
- Accreditation: Central Military Commission, Ministry of Education
- Affiliations: People's Liberation Army Air Force
- Location: Wuhan, Hubei, China; 30.627020°N 114.285081°E
- Campus: Urban

The Air Force Early Warning Academy (中国人民解放军空军预警学院) is a professional military education college of the People's Liberation Army Air Force. The college operates four campuses, and is headquartered in Wuhan, Hubei, China.

The academy was originally established in 1952 as the Chinese People's Liberation Army Air Defense School and Radar School (中国人民解放军防空学校和雷达学校). In 1983, the school was renamed Air Force Radar Academy (空军雷达学院). In 1992, it was upgraded to a military-level college, and in 2004, it was designated as an intermediate-level military education college. In 2011, the academy was renamed Air Force Early Warning Academy.

== History ==
Today's Air Force Early Warning Academy began as two separate institutions, a military communications school and an air defense school. Their later merger in 1958 would form the Air Force Radar Academy until it was renamed to its present title.

=== Communications school ===
In 1950, following communist victory in the Chinese Civil War and establishment of the People's Republic of China, the newly formed People's Liberation Army established the East China Military Region Communications School in Nanjing. On 15 September 1951, the Central Military Commission (CMC) renamed the school to the Third Communication School of the People's Liberation Army. On 29 October 1952, the school was renamed to the Radar School, a name it maintained for another three years until, in 1955, it was retitled the People's Liberation Army Air Defense Radar School and transferred from the Communications Department of the General Staff to the Air Defense Force. In 1957, the school was once again renamed to the Chinese People's Liberation Army Air Force Radar Technical College and placed under the command of the PLAAF Headquarters.

=== Air defense school ===
In June 1952, separate from the communications school, the PLA established its Air Defense School in Nanchang, Jiangxi. In November 1952, the school was moved to the AFEWA's present location in Wuhan City, Hubei Province and was subordinated to the Air Defense Command of the CMC. In September 1955, the school was renamed to the Air Defense School under the Air Defense Force. Two years later, in August 1957, the school was once again renamed to the Air Force Air Defense School of the Chinese People's Liberation Army and transferred to the Air Force.

=== Merge ===
In September 1958, the then Air Force Radar Technical College merged with the Air Force Air Defense School to form the AFEWA's primary predecessor, the Chinese People's Liberation Army Air Force Radar School, managed by the Wuhan Military Region Air Force. Eleven years later, in November 1969, the school was briefly renamed to the Air Force Fourth College but its name was reversed in May 1975 and in July 1983 became the Air Force Radar Academy under the Guangzhou Military Region Air Force. The academy would remain until August 1992 when it was transferred from the Guangzhou Military Region Air Force to report directly to PLAAF headquarters. In 1996, the Air Force Radar Academy established its Huangpi campus. In 2004, the Suizhou Non-Commissioned Officer Brigade was established under the Air Force Radar Academy and campuses were established in Suizhou and Yichang. In July 2011, the academy was renamed to its present title, the Air Force Early Warning Academy of the People's Liberation Army.

== Education ==
The Air Force Early Warning Academy, accredited under both the Chinese Ministry of Education and the Central Military Commission (CMC), recruits male high school (高中) graduates across the People's Republic of China (PRC) and provides graduates a bachelor's degree in either military science or engineering and the requisite training to fill platoon and company leadership positions as junior officers in early warning and detection units. In 2017, the academy recruited 340 young men from 21 provinces (including directly administered municipalities and autonomous regions).

The AFEWA offers five majors to enrolled students:

- Early warning and detection (预警探测), 77.6% of enrollees
- Radar engineering (雷达工程), 10.3% of enrollees
- Command information systems engineering (指挥信息系统工程), 3.2% of enrollees
- Network power command and engineering (网电指挥与工程), 2.9% of enrollees
- Unmanned systems engineering (无人系统工程), 5.9% of enrollees

In all but the unmanned systems engineering major, students reapply to the program for their master's degree. For the radar engineering and network power command and engineering majors, graduates must serve for two years before reapplying while graduates of the early warning and detection and command information systems engineering programs may apply for a masters directly following their completion of the bachelor's program.

The AFEWA also publishes the academic Journal of Air Force Early Warning Academy (空军预警学院学报) which covers topics such as developing theories, technologies, and processes in radar and related communications technologies. Established in 1987, the journal became a quarterly publication in 1999, and bimonthly in 2009. Originally named the Journal of Air Force Radar Academy, it was renamed to its present name in 2013. As of 7 June 2020, the journal had published 2,249 papers which had been cited 6,085 times and downloaded 62,355 times.

=== Campuses ===
The AFEWA operates four campuses

- Headquarters campus at 288 Hangpu Street, Jian'an District, Wuhan City, Hubei Province
- Huangpi Campus (Huangpi Non-Commissioned Officer School) at 3 Qiangjun Road, Wuhu Street, Huangpi District, Wuhan City, Hubei Province
- Yichang Campus (Yichang Training Brigade) in Longquan Township, Yiling District, Yichang City, Hubei Province
- Suizhou Campus (Suizhou Branch) in Suizhou City, Hubei Province

== Notable members ==
=== Wang Yongliang ===
Major General Wang Yongliang (王永良) is professor and doctoral supervisor at the Air Force Early Warning Academy is a renowned radar technologist. Born in June 1965 in Jiaxing, Zhejiang, in 1987 Wang graduated from the AFEWA's predecessor, the Air Force Radar Academy, and is an academician of the Chinese Academy of Sciences. Wang is well known for his theories and breakthrough achievements in time-based signal processing in radar and his accomplishments have found wide application in the PLAAF such as in the branch's anti-clutter, anti-jamming, and moving target detection radar capabilities aboard reconnaissance, fighter, and early-warning platforms.

=== Xiong Jiajun ===
Major General Xiong Jiajun (熊家军) is a professor and doctoral supervisor at the Air Force Early Warning Academy and is one of the PLAAF's preeminent technical experts in the fields of early warning and intelligence. From Tianmen, Hubei, Xiong previously served as a representative of the 12th National People's Congress (NPC) and presently serves as director of the Chinese Command and Control Society (中国指挥与控制学会) and Chinese Military Operations Research Society (中国军事运筹学学会). Xiong is also serves as an expert member of the China Cloud Computing Expert Advisory Committee (中国云计算专家咨询委) and the Air Force Information Technology Expert Advisory Committee (空军信息化专家咨询委), and a judge on both the Military Weapons and Equipment Science and Technology Award Review Committee (军队武器装备科技奖评审委) and Air Force Senior Professional Technical Title Evaluation Committee (空军信息化专家咨询委).

== See also ==
- Academic institutions of the armed forces of China
