= China Coast Guard Academy =

Higher education institution under China Coast Guard

- 中国人民武装警察部队海警学院
- Logo of the CCG Academy
- Type: Military academy
- Established: June 28, 2010
- Affiliations: People's Armed Police
- Location: 205 West Zhenxing Road, Ningbo, Zhejiang, 315801, China; 29.94387°N 121.71097°E
- Campus: 226.23 hectares (559.0 acres); Urban
- Location within Zhejiang

China Coast Guard Academy is a higher education institution dedicated to training talents for China Coast Guard. Located in Ningbo, Zhejiang, China, the academy is known as the "cradle of border police" and is listed in the order of battle of the People's Armed Police (PAP) as a deputy corps leader grade unit.

== History ==
In 1982, the academy was founded as the Training Division of the Coastal Patrol of Zhejiang Provincial Corps of the Chinese People's Armed Police (Chinese: 中国人民武装警察部队浙江省总队海巡训练大队) under the Ministry of Public Security, and organised as a regiment commander grade unit in the order of battle of the PAP.

In September 1983, the State Council approved the foundation of the Surface Vessel School of the People's Armed Police (Chinese: 中国人民武装警察部队水面船艇学校) on the basis of the training division and under the direct supervision of the PAP headquarters. The first batch of students were enrolled in September 1985.

In August 1993, the supervising agency changed from the PAP headquarter to the Ministry of Public Security. The school was thus organised as a unit in the organization chart of the Border Defence Force of the Ministry of Public Security. In September 1997, the school began recruiting students as a post-secondary specialised school rather than as a secondary specialised school as in the past. In March 1999, the school was formally upgraded with the approval from the Ministry of Education and became the "Higher Vocational School of Coastal Police". In December 2009, with the approval from the Ministry of Education, the school was renamed the "China Maritime Police Academy" and began offering degree education as the only higher education institution in China to offer training for maritime law enforcement.

In August 2012, the academy became co-funded by the Ministry of Public Security, the People's Government of Zhejiang Province, and the Municipal People's Government of Ningbo City. From July 2018, with the separation of the Coast Guard from the Border Defence Force, the academy came under direct PAP jurisdiction as part of China Coast Guard.

== Education ==
In 2010, the first four undergraduate programmes the academy offered included navigational technology, marine engineering, electronic science and technology, electrical information engineering. As an academy for coast guard training, academy contextualised its education for maritime law enforcement, with additional training in maritime rescue, damage control, etc.

== See also ==
- Academic institutions of the armed forces of China
