= Harbin Flight Academy =

Chinese military school

- 哈尔滨飞行学院
- Active: 1949–present
- Country: China
- Allegiance: Chinese Communist Party
- Branch: People's Liberation Army Air Force
- Type: Training Academy
- Part of: PLAAF Headquarters
- Nickname: Unit 93163

Aircraft flown
- Trainer: JL-9, JL-10, H-6

The Harbin Flight Academy (Chinese: 哈尔滨飞行学院; pinyin: Hā'ěrbīn Fēixíng Xuéyuàn) is an aviation training academy in the People's Republic of China reporting directly to the People's Liberation Army Air Force (PLAAF) headquarters. One of three flight academies in the PLAAF, Harbin Flight Academy is located in Harbin, capital city of Heilongjiang Province and is the only institution to train the Chinese air force bomber pilots.

The academy operates the Hongdu JL-8, Guizhou JL-9, Chengdu JL-10, and Xian H-6 aircraft.

== History ==
Established on 1 December 1949, months after establishment of the People's Republic of China, the Harbin Flight Academy began as the Air Force 1st Bomber School (空军第一轰炸学校) under the Shenyang Military Region Air Force. The school was renamed to the Air Force First Aviation School in 1976 and the Air Force First Aviation School in 1976, again to the Air Force 1st Aviation Academy (第一航空学校) in September of 1986, and once more in 1996 to the Air Force 1st Flight College (空军第一航空学院). The 1st Flight College first accepted female pilots in 2008. In August of 2011, the college was renamed to the Harbin Flight College when it merged with the Air Force 3rd Flight College (空军第三飞行学院). Also in 2011, the headquarters of the four military branches met and decided to integrated the then six flight academies of the PLAAF into three in Harbin, Shijiazhuang, and Xi'an. The 1st and 3rd Flight Colleges were merged into Harbin Flight Academy, the 4th and 6th into Shijiazhuang Flight Academy, and the 2nd and 5th into Xi'an Flight Academy. Harbin Flight Academy was designated a corps deputy leader grade unit.

In 2017, the PLAAF changed its official English translation of the name from Harbin Flight College to Harbin Flight Academy.

== Organization ==
The Harbin Flight Academy previously comprised separate basic and advanced trainer regiments (初级教练团 and 高级教练团, respectively), however, the academy transitioned in 2012 to numbered training brigades (训练旅) ranging from the 1st Training Brigade to the 5th Training Brigade. Below each brigade are three flight groups (飞行大队) each of which represents a training class (班). The academy's staff is structured similarly to an operational PLA unit maintaining a staff department, political work department, and support department. Contrary to the academies of foreign air forces, Harbin Flight Academy instructors are not senior, experienced pilots, but instead comprise the academy's valedictorians who remain at the academy following their graduation to instruct.

Aircraft operated by the Harbin Flight Academy can be identified by their four digit tail numbers led by the number '1' and the penultimate digit communicates the training brigade (from 1st to 5th). Similar tail numbers beginning with a '2' or '3' belong to the Shijiazhuang or Xi'an Flight Academies, respectively.

== Training ==
The 2nd Training Brigade of the academy exclusively train bomber pilots. From the academy's days as the 1st Flight College, the 2nd Training Brigade trained its students on H-5 bombers (a copy of the Ilyushin Il-28) until 2007 when the brigade only trained on Xian Y-7 transport aircraft, depriving to-be pilots of any experience on the bomber platforms they'd fly until they reached their first assignment. Training on Y-8 transport aircraft continued until April 2015 when the academy received the latest H-6K bombers and the first class trained on the new H-6Ks graduated a year later in February 2016.

Students of Harbin Flight Academy, like those of Xi'an and Shijiazhuang Flight Academies, have already graduated from Air Force Aviation University with a bachelor's degree and will be awarded a second bachelor's upon graduation of Harbin Flight Academy.

In 2018, the academy introduced unscripted air combat exercises exposing pilots to unexpected conditions fulfilling a goal set by the PLAAF in 2011. The same year, Harbin Flight Academy expanded its enrollment of female pilots to accept 38 new female high school graduates. Also in 2018, the academy made minor English headlines after a quick-thinking squad leader at the academy saved a trainee who had failed to lob his grenade over a training wall.

In 2020, a year after Shijianzhuang Flight Academy, Harbin Flight Academy received the JL-10 fourth-generation trainer aircraft, reducing the technical gap between PLAAF trainer and operational aircraft.

In 2021, cadets at Harbin Flight Academy demonstrated new low-altitude training in the canyons of northeast Liaoning province.

== Notable alumni ==
- Jiang Jiaji, first pilot to win in the Golden Helmet competition three times
- Liu Boming, fighter pilot and taikonaut with the record for hours on spacewalk
- Liu Yang, first Chinese female taikonaut in space
- Song Zhiyong, head of Chinese Civil Aviation Administration, former chairman of Air China
- Wang Yaping, second female taikonaut, first Chinese woman to perform a spacewalk
- Zhai Zhigang, PLASSF major general, first Chinese citizen to carry out a spacewalk

== See also ==
- Xi'an Flight Academy
- Shijiazhuang Flight Academy
- Academic institutions of the armed forces of China
