= Huang Cisheng =

Chinese militar (1938–2020)

- 黄次胜

Deputy Commander of the Second Artillery Corps
- In office November 1996 – July 2001
- Commander: Yang Guoliang

Personal details
- Born: April 1938 Ningbo, Zhejiang, China
- Died: July 25, 2020 (aged 82) Beijing, China
- Party: Chinese Communist Party
- Education: PLA Rocket Force University of Engineering

Military service
- Allegiance: People's Republic of China
- Branch/service: People's Liberation Army Ground Force
- Years of service: 1960-2020
- Rank: Lieutenant general
- Commands: Second Artillery Corps

Chinese name
- Traditional Chinese: 黃次勝
- Simplified Chinese: 黄次胜
Transcriptions
Standard Mandarin
- Hanyu Pinyin: Huáng Cìshèng

Huang Cisheng (Chinese: 黄次胜; April 1938 – 25 July 2020) was a lieutenant general (Zhongjiang) of the People's Liberation Army. He was a delegate to the 13th National Congress of the Chinese Communist Party and a deputy to the 10th National People's Congress.

== Biography ==
Huang was born in Ningbo, Zhejiang, in April 1938. He joined the People's Liberation Army soon after finishing college from the PLA Rocket Force University of Engineering in 1960. He joined the Chinese Communist Party in May of the following year. He had successively served as the staff officer, deputy team leader, deputy director, director and then president of the Training Department of the Academic Affairs Office, dean of its Command School, dean of its Engineering College, and director of its Equipment Technology Department. In November 1996, he was assigned as deputy commander of the Second Artillery Corps, and held that office until July 2001. He died of illness in Beijing, on July 25, 2020. He was promoted to major general in 1988 and to lieutenant general in 1998, aged 82.
