= Yu Qingjiang =

Chinese General and Politician

- 俞庆江

Chief of Staff of the People's Liberation Army Air Force
- Incumbent
- Assumed office December 2017
- Preceded by: Ma Zhenjun

President the PLA Air Force Command College
- In office October 2015 – December 2017
- Preceded by: Ma Jian
- Succeeded by: Fu Guoqiang

Personal details
- Born: September 1963 (age 63) Nanjing, Jiangsu, China
- Party: Chinese Communist Party
- Education: Air Force Political College; Air Force Engineering University; Russian Air Force Military Academy; PLA National Defence University

Military service
- Allegiance: People's Republic of China
- Branch/service: People's Liberation Army Air Force
- Years of service: ?–present
- Rank: Air Force Lieutenant General

Chinese name
- Simplified Chinese: 俞庆江
- Traditional Chinese: 俞慶江
Transcriptions
Standard Mandarin
- Hanyu Pinyin: Yú Qìngjiāng

Yu Qingjiang (Chinese: 俞庆江; born September 1963) is a lieutenant general (zhong jiang) of the People's Liberation Army Air Force (PLAAF) of China, serving as chief of staff of the People's Liberation Army Air Force since December 2017. Previously he served as president of the PLA Air Force Command College. He is a representative of the 19th National Congress of the Chinese Communist Party.

== Biography ==
Yu was born in Nanjing, Jiangsu, in September 1963. He graduated from Air Force Political College, Russian Air Force Military Academy, Air Force Engineering University, and the PLA National Defence University.

He served as commander of the 30th Air Force Aviation Division of Shenyang Military Region before being appointed as commander of the PLA Air Force Dalian Base in June 2007. In 2009, he became deputy chief of staff of the Air Force of Jinan Military Region, rising to chief of staff in 2013. In October 2015, he was made president the PLA Air Force Command College, succeeding Ma Jian. In December 2017, he rose to become chief of staff of the People's Liberation Army Air Force.

He was promoted to the rank of major general (Shaojiang) in December 2010 and lieutenant general (zhongjiang) in June 2019.

== Personal life ==
Yu likes calligraphy, for which he studied under Ouyang Zhongshi and Li duo at the China Calligraphy and Painting International University for three years.

Military offices
Preceded by Ma Jian	President the PLA Air Force Command College; 2015–2017	Succeeded by Fu Guoqiang (付国强)
Preceded by Ma Zhenjun	Chief of Staff of the People's Liberation Army Air Force; 2017–present	Incumbent
