= Border Defense Bureau of the National Defense Mobilization Department =

Chinese border defense agency

- 中央军委国防动员部边防局

Agency overview
- Formed: 11 January 2016
- Type: Subordinate bureau of the Central Military Commission
- Jurisdiction: People's Liberation Army
- Headquarters: Beijing
- Agency executive: Huang Xiaodong (黄晓东), Director
- Parent department: National Defense Mobilization Department
- Website: chinamil.com.cn

The Border Defense Bureau of the National Defense Mobilization Bureau, "Border Defense Bureau" (BDB) for short, is a Corps-grade organ of the Central Military Commission, responsible for the execution of border protection policy. It is based in Beijing.

== History ==
Before 2016, the "Border Defense Bureau" was a subordinate office of the People's Liberation Army General Staff Department's Operation Office, serving also as the administrative office of the National Committee on Border and Coastal Defense. In 1996, each province, prefecture, and county was required to set up its own border defense committee.

With the 2015 reforms, the Border Defense Bureau was transferred to the National Defense Mobilization Department of the Central Military Commission.

== Duties ==
The bureau is responsible for coordinating the defense of 22,000 kilometers of land borders, 18,000 kilometers of mainland coastline, and 14,000 kilometers of island coastline.

Since 1996, China has been building an extensive system of facilities and monitoring systems to cover the entirety of this massive border. Since 2017, the military border is patrolled by the PLA (replacing the PAP), and the National Immigration Administration and General Administration of Customs are responsible for civilian border crossings. The BDB has coordinating duties for the military border defense units, and the civilian border protection entities (such a drug interdiction by the Public Security Bureaus, undocumented migration control by the China Immigration Inspection, even the foreign ministry border office).

The BDB is responsible for coordinating the construction, maintenance, and use of hundreds of border crossings, 30,000 km of border roads, 25,000 km of maritime border patrol tunnels, 7,000 km of fences, 3,000 border markers, watchtowers, and coastal installations; and it is responsible for the "digital border surveillance system" (边防数字监控系统), finished in 2009, that links thousands of surveillance sentry posts to 10 large-scale monitoring centers with over 10,000km of fiber optic cables. The BDB is also responsible for coordinating with local authorities to carry out the "five-in-one" border defense policy (meaning the army, the police, the state, the party, and the people coordinating for border defense), and implementing "3D border protection and control systems" (边境立体化防控体系) using new information technology to monitor the borders.

== Organization ==
=== Directly Subordinate units ===
The China-Kazakhstan-Tajikistan-Kyrgyzstan Border Disarmament Implementation Office of the Ministry of National Defense (which monitors the 1996 agreement on demilitarization of the border by the Shanghai Five) is headed by Huang Xiaodong, the head of the Border Defense Bureau, and it is likely part of a "two organizations, one office" arrangement.

== See also ==
- Central Military Commission (China)
- National Defense Mobilization Commission
- National Committee of Border Control and Coastal Defense
- People's Liberation Army
  - Xinjiang Military District
  - Tibet Military District
  - Army Academy of Border and Coastal Defense
- Ministry of Public Security
  - National Immigration Administration
    - China Immigration Inspection
- State Oceanic Administration
- China Coast Guard
