= People's Armed Police Special Police College =

Chinese tactical police unit and training organization

Special Police College
- SPC logo
- Active: 1982 – present
- Country: China
- Agency: People's Armed Police
- Type: Police Training Unit
- Role: Counter-terrorism; Law enforcement; Riot control
- Motto: 忠诚，勇敢，团结，奉献; Loyal, Brave, United, [Willing to] Sacrifice

The People's Armed Police Special Police College (特种警察学院) is a Chinese counterterror police unit and training organization.

== History ==
In 1982, the Ministry of Public Security formed a secret police force for aircraft hijackings. The force was transferred to the PAP; it was renamed as the Special Police School in 1985. In 2000, the school's dual education and combat/operation functions were "elevated" and it was renamed to the Special Police College.

In May 2005, it was reported that the college has trained more than 1,000 officers since it was established. In August 2006, the special police units were provided new uniforms for feedback prior to general issue.

On April 9, 2014, President Xi Jinping presented the official flag of the Falcon Commando Unit, which is under the college's command.

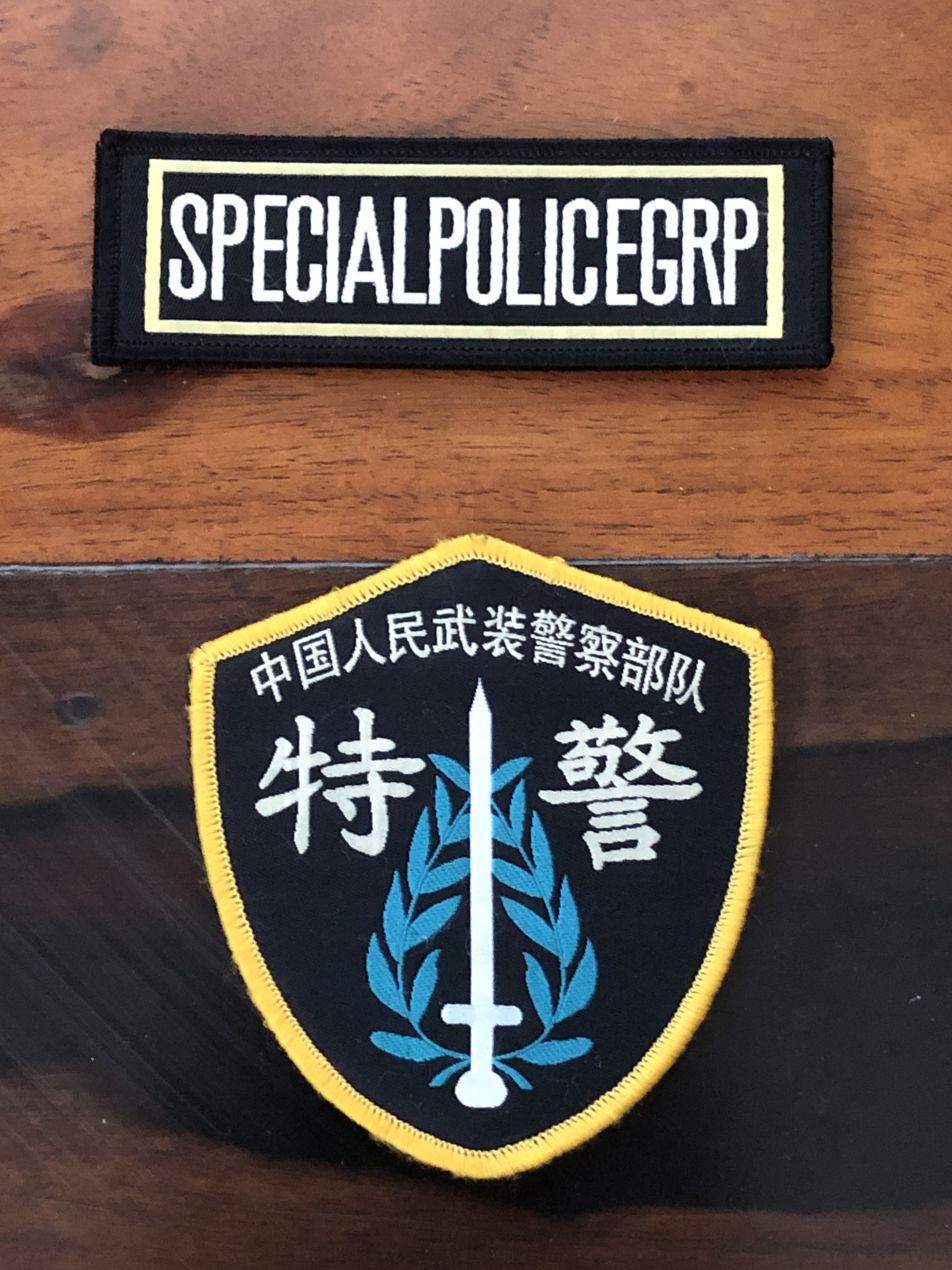
Former insignia of the SPU

== See also ==
- Academic institutions of the armed forces of China
- Snow Leopard Commando Unit
- Beijing SWAT
