= Changsha Aeronautical Vocational and Technical College =

University in Changsha, China

Coordinates: 28°08′33″N 113°02′39″E

- 长沙航空职业技术学院
- Motto: 自强不息 止於至善
- Type: Public university
- Established: 1973; 53 years ago
- Affiliations: People's Liberation Army Air Force Armament Department
- President: Zhu Houwang (朱厚望)
- Communist Party Secretary: Hu Dapeng (胡大鹏)
- Academic staff: 389
- Students: 9,200
- Campus: 800 mu
- Website: www.cavtc.edu.cn

Changsha Aeronautical Vocational and Technical College (simplified Chinese: 长沙航空职业技术学院; traditional Chinese: 長沙航空職業技術學院; pinyin: Chángshā Hángkōng Zhíyè Jìshù Xuéyuàn) is a university located in Changsha, Hunan, China. The university covers a total area of 800 mu, with more than 300,000 square meters of floor space.

As of fall 2014, the university has one campus, a combined student body of 9,200 students, 389 faculty members.

== History ==
It was formed in 1973 and initially called "PLA 5712 Factory Technical School". In 2002, Changsha Factory School merged into the university.

== Academics ==
The university consists of 6 departments:

- Department of Aeronautical Engineering
- Department of Mechanical Manufacturing Engineering
- Department of Electrical and Electronic Engineering
- Department of Chemical Engineering and Information Engineering
- Department of Economic and Trade
- Department of Administrative Engineering

== Culture ==
- Motto: 自强不息 止於至善
