= Non-commissioned Officer Academy of the People's Armed Police =

Chinese non-commissioned officer school

- 中国人民武装警察部队士官学校
- Type: Military academy
- Affiliations: People's Armed Police
- Location: Xixi campus: 377 Tianmushan Road, Xixi Subdistrict, Xihu District, Hangzhou, Zhejiang, China; 30.2611184°N 120.0678152°E; Fuyang campus: Sanlian Village, Fuchun Subdistrict, Fuyang District, Hangzhou, Zhejiang, China; 30.08662°N 119.87565°E
- Campus: Multiple sites

The Non-commissioned Officer Academy of the People's Armed Police is a higher education institution under the People's Armed Police (PAP). Founded in 2017 through the merger of two non-commissioned officer schools in Hangzhou and Shijiazhuang, the academy is headquartered in Hangzhou as the only non-commissioned officer school within the PAP.

== History ==
=== Hangzhou Non-commissioned Officer School ===
Founded in April 1984 as the Hangzhou Command School located within the West Lake Scenic Area, the school was an affiliation of Zhejiang Provincial Corps of PAP. In 2004, the PAP founded the Hangzhou branch of PAP Command College, which located within the Hangzhou Command School. Since 2004, the school began recruiting students for undergraduate education in military command from local schools as well as within the army. In 2006, the Hangzhou Command School was renamed as Hangzhou Command College. In July 2011, the college was renamed as Hangzhou Non-commissioned Officer School, and transformed from a deputy division commander level unit to a division commander level unit, with college becoming an education institution for incumbent officers. In 2012, the school started building a new campus in Fuyang with its own fund.

=== Shijiazhuang Non-commissioned Officer School ===
In 1983, the Training Division of the Hebei Provincial Contingent of PAP was transformed into the Shijiazhuang Command School, which started offering secondary vocational education in 1984. In 2000, the school began offering postsecondary vocational education. In 2004, the PAP founded the Shijiazhuang branch of Command College within the Shijiazhuang Command School. In September 2009, the school was upgraded to Shijiazhuang Command College. In September 2011, the school was renamed as the Shijiazhuang Non-commissioned Officer School.

=== 2017 Merger ===
In 2017, in the Chinese military reforms, the two non-commissioned officer schools was merged into the new and only non-commissioned officer school based in Hangzhou. The school thus became among the 36 military academies that recruited students from outsides of the military systems. Yet, it doesn't recruit students through Gaokao.
