= Rocket Force University of Engineering =

Military university in Xi'an, Shaanxi, China

- 中国人民解放军火箭军工程大学
- Logo of the Rocket Force University of Engineering
- Former name: Second Artillery Engineering University (中国人民解放军第二炮兵工程大学)
- Motto: 博学笃志 砺剑图强
- Type: Military university
- Established: 1951; 75 years ago
- Affiliations: People's Liberation Army Rocket Force
- President: Wang Yaopeng
- Vice-president: Liu Guangbin; Song Jixian
- Location: Xi'an, Shaanxi, China

Chinese name
- Simplified Chinese: 中国人民解放军火箭军工程大学
- Traditional Chinese: 中國人民解放軍火箭軍工程大學
Transcriptions
Standard Mandarin
- Hanyu Pinyin: Zhōngguó Rénmín Jiěfàngjūn Huǒjiànjūn Gōngchéng Dàxué

The Rocket Force University of Engineering (Chinese: 中国人民解放军火箭军工程大学) a military university in Baqiao, Xi'an, Shaanxi, China. It is affiliated with the People's Liberation Army Rocket Force.

The university consists of 3 colleges and 7 departments. At present, the university has 90 research institutions and research centers, including 1 national engineering research centre, 4 national key laboratories.

== History ==
PLA Second Artillery Engineering University was founded in January 1951, it was initially called "PLA Northwest Military Region Artillery Command College", then it was renamed "PLA First Artillery Command College". In 1956, it was renamed again and called "PLA Xi'an Artillery Command College". In 1959, Teach Brigade of the Department of Defense and 15th PLA Air Force College of Aeronautics merged into the university. The university changed to its currently in January, following the name change of Second Artillery Corps to Rocket Force.

== Schools and Departments ==
- College of Science
- College of Basic Education for Commanding Officers
- College of Professional Technology for Officers
- Department of Measurement and Control Engineering
- Department of Electrical Engineering and Automation
- Department of Electronic Engineering
- Department of Weapons and Launch Systems Engineering
- Department of Flight Vehicle Propulsion Engineering
- Department of Nuclear Technology and Security
- Department of Management Engineering
- Department of Environmental Engineering
- Department of Fire Control and Command and Control Engineering
- Department of Mechanical Engineering and Automation
- Department of Communication Engineering
- Department of Information Security
- Department of Information Engineering
- Department of Command Information System Engineering

== Notable alumni ==
- Liu Zheng

== See also ==
- Academic institutions of the armed forces of China
