= Air Force Engineering University =

Military university in Xi'an, Shaanxi, China

Coordinates: 34.273779°N 109.036171°E

- 空军工程大学
- Motto: 面向空天，脚踏实地，传承创新
- Motto in English: Facing the Air and Space; Having Feet on the Ground; Inheriting Innovation
- Type: Military university
- Established: July 1999; 27 years ago
- Location: Xi'an, Shaanxi, China
- Website: www.afeu.cn

The Air Force Engineering University (AFEU; 中国人民解放军空军工程大学) is a military university in Xi'an, Shaanxi, China. It is affiliated with the People's Liberation Army Air Force.

The university was established in July 1999 by the merger of the former Air Force Engineering College (空军工程学院), the Air Force Missile College (空军导弹学院), and the Air Force Telecommunications Engineering College (空军电讯工程学院).

The university has 6 colleges with about 8000 students and 700 teachers and professors.

== Department ==
- College of Aeronautics Engineering (former Air Force Engineering Academy)
- College of Air and Missile Defense (former Air Force Missile Academy)
- College of Information and Navigation (former Air Force Telecommunication Engineering Academy)
- College of Air Traffic Control and Navigation
- College of Equipment Management and UAV Engineering
- College of Aircraft-Technical Segreants
- College of Graduate Students
- Department of Basic Education
- Department of Military and Political Education
- Department of Foreign Cadet Training

== See also ==
- Academic institutions of the armed forces of China
