= Grades of the armed forces of China =

Core command structure of China's armed forces

The organization of the armed forces of the People's Republic of China is based on grades. Each military formation, institution, billet, and officer has a grade. Personnel grades flow from the institution's grade. For example, the grade of a unit commander billet is the same as the unit's, and the officer in that billet receives that grade. Historically, grade, rather than rank, determined or indicated an officer's authority, and various professional and career factors.

== Overview ==
=== Hierarchy ===
Grades determine the command hierarchy from the Central Military Commission (CMC) to the platoon level. Since 1988, all institutions, billets, and officers in the People's Liberation Army (PLA) and the People's Armed Police (PAP) have a grade. Entities command lower-graded entities, and coordinate with like-graded entities. An institution shares its grade with its leading officers, and all sub-ordinate institutions and officers have lower grades. Under the dual-command structure, an institution's military commanding officer and political officer have the same grade.

Civil–military relations within the wider state bureaucracy is also influenced by grades. The grading systems used by the armed forces and the government are parallel, making it easier for military entities to identify the civilian entities they should coordinate with.

=== Personnel management ===
An officer's authority, eligibility for billets, pay, and retirement age is determined by grade ("position grade".) Career progression includes lateral transfers between billets of the same grade, but which are not considered promotions. An officer retiring to the civil service has their grade translated to the civil grade system; their grade continues to progress and draw retirement benefits through the civil system rather than the armed forces.

Historically, personnel grade — or position (Chinese: 职务等级; pinyin: zhíwù děngjí) — was more important than rank (Chinese: 军衔; pinyin: jūnxián). Historically, time-in-grade and time-in-rank requirements and promotions were not synchronized; multiple ranks were present in each grade with all having the same authority. Rank was mainly a visual aid to roughly determine relative position when interacting with Chinese and foreign personnel. PLA etiquette preferred addressing personnel by position rather than by rank. Reforms to a more rank-centric system began in 2021. In 2023, a revised grade structure associated one rank per grade, with some ranks spanning multiple grades.

=== Civilians ===
The highest grade is CMC chairman; the General Secretary of the Chinese Communist Party, a civilian, is the CMC's chair which makes them the armed forces' representative in the Politburo Standing Committee, the country's ruling body. Civilian CMC members have personnel grades but do not have military ranks. During the drafting of the 1988 system, Deng Xiaoping - then CMC chairman - refused the rank of (depending on the report) marshal or "first class general"; first class general was the highest rank under the 1988 system and intended for the top leadership. The practice of an unranked CMC chairman was formalized in 1994 and the rank of first class general was abolished.

== History ==
=== Early systems ===
The Chinese Red Army, and later the PLA, did not use grades or ranks during the Chinese Civil War. Personnel were addressed by job titles. During the Second United Front period, the Eighth Route Army and the New Fourth Army were officially part of the Kuomintang's National Revolutionary Army, and therefore formally used its system of ranks from 1937 to 1946; this was not official Chinese Communist Party policy. After the establishment of the PRC, a 21-grade system was adopted in 1952. In 1955, this changed to 20 grades, combined with 15 Soviet-based military ranks; the ranks were abolished in 1965. The number of grades changed to 27 in 1965, 23 in 1972, and 18 in 1979; the 1965 and 1972 changes were based on the State Administrative Grade System.

=== 1988 reforms ===
The 1988 system had 15 grades and 10 ranks. The grades paralleled the civil grade system. The system had a many-to-many relationship between grades and ranks because grade and rank promotions were unsynchronized. From 1988 to 1994, there were three ranks allowable per grade; by 2021 there were two ranks per grade. A rank could also appear across grades; for example, major general could appear from division leader to military region deputy leader grades.

The vague relationship between grades and ranks was not the only problem. Further difficulties appeared with the Deepening National Defense and Military Reform - particularly the operational reorganization around theater commands - and the disruption of career paths with the conversion of many divisions and regiments into brigades.

Theater command leader and theater command deputy leader replaced military region leader and military region deputy leader respectively. Brigade leader and deputy brigade leader were also added; they may have been equivalent to division leader and deputy division leader in 2016 and then to deputy division leader and regiment leader in 2020.

1988 officer grades and ranks
Grade	Ranks	
Grade	Most common	Less common
CMC chairman CMC Vice-chairman	None; General	
CMC member	General	
Military region leader	General/Admiral	Lieutenant general/Vice admiral
Military region deputy leader	Lieutenant general/Vice admiral	Major general/Rear admiral
Corps leader	Major general/Rear admiral	Lieutenant general/Vice admiral
Corps deputy leader	Major general/Rear admiral	Senior colonel/Senior captain
Division leader	Senior colonel/Senior captain	Major general/Rear admiral
Division deputy leader	Colonel/Captain	Senior colonel/Senior captain
Regiment leader	Colonel/Captain	Lieutenant colonel/Commander
Regiment deputy leader	Lieutenant colonel/Commander	Major/Lieutenant commander
Battalion leader	Major/Lieutenant commander	Lieutenant colonel/Lieutenant commander
Battalion deputy leader	Captain/Lieutenant	Major/Lieutenant commander
Company leader	Captain/Lieutenant	First lieutenant/Lieutenant (junior grade)
Company deputy leader	First lieutenant/Lieutenant (junior grade)	Captain/Lieutenant
Platoon leader	Second lieutenant/Ensign	First lieutenant/Ensign

=== 2021 reforms ===
Changing to a rank-centric system was being considered by 2016 and became policy as part of the 2021 "interim" reforms to officer management and recruitment policies to improve professionalism. The reforms created a four-grade structure for technical specialists (senior professional, deputy senior professional, intermediate professional and junior professional), a separate pay level structure, and linked pay and benefits to rank rather than grade.

The revised officer grade system associated each grade to one rank, although a rank could be associated with multiple grades. The implementation of the new rank-based system seems to be ongoing at a slow pace, starting by equating TC appointments with full General rank, and deputy TC positions with Lt Generals, but the change is still not quite applied to lower posts and to field and company posts.

Post-2021 officer grades and ranks
Pay Level	Grade	Rank	Equivalent civil service grade	Notes
1	CMC chairman	None	National leader	
2	CMC deputy chairman	General; Admiral	Deputy national leader	
3	CMC member	General; Admiral	Quasi-national deputy leader	
4	Theater command leader	General; Admiral	Provincial/ministry leader	
5	Theater command deputy leader	Lieutenant general Vice admiral	Provincial/ministry leader	
6	Corps leader	Major general Rear admiral	Provincial/ministry leader	
7	Corps Deputy Leader	Major general Rear admiral	Provincial/ministry deputy leader	
7	Division leader	Senior colonel Commodore (Senior captain)	Provincial/ministry deputy leader	Treated as corps deputy leader for salary and benefits
8	Division officer	Senior colonel Commodore (Senior captain)	Department leader	
9	Division deputy leader	Senior colonel Commodore (Senior captain)	Department deputy leader	
8–11	Regiment leader	Colonel; Captain	County leader	
10–13	Regiment deputy leader	Lieutenant colonel Commander	County deputy leader	
12–16	Battalion leader	Major; Lieutenant commander	Township leader	
12–16	Battalion deputy leader	Major; Lieutenant commander	Township deputy leader	
14–17	Company leader	Captain; Lieutenant		
15–18	Company deputy leader	First lieutenant Lieutenant (junior grade)		
17–19	Platoon leader	Second lieutenant Ensign/Sublieutenant		

== Insignia ==
Grade was indicated on a uniform by the Type 07 ribbon bar system, and the total number of ribbon rows. The system also marked years of service. The current system is called the Type 23 system, and includes post grades for NCOs and technical officers.

=== 2023 grade ribbon bars ===
CMC Vice-chairman

CMC member

Theater Command leader

Theater Command deputy leader

Corps leader

Corps deputy leader

Division leader

Division deputy leader

Regiment leader

Regiment deputy leader

Battalion leader

Battalion deputy leader

Company leader

Deputy company leader

Platoon leader

Senior specialist technical officer

Deputy senior specialist technical officer

Intermediate specialist technical officer

Junior specialist technical officer

Staff sergeant

Platoon leader

Deputy platoon leader

Squad leader

Deputy squad leader

== See also ==
- Civil service of China
- Cadre system of the Chinese Communist Party
- Administrative divisions of China
- Civilian cadres of the People's Liberation Army
