= Type 97 Service Dress =

Former military uniform of China

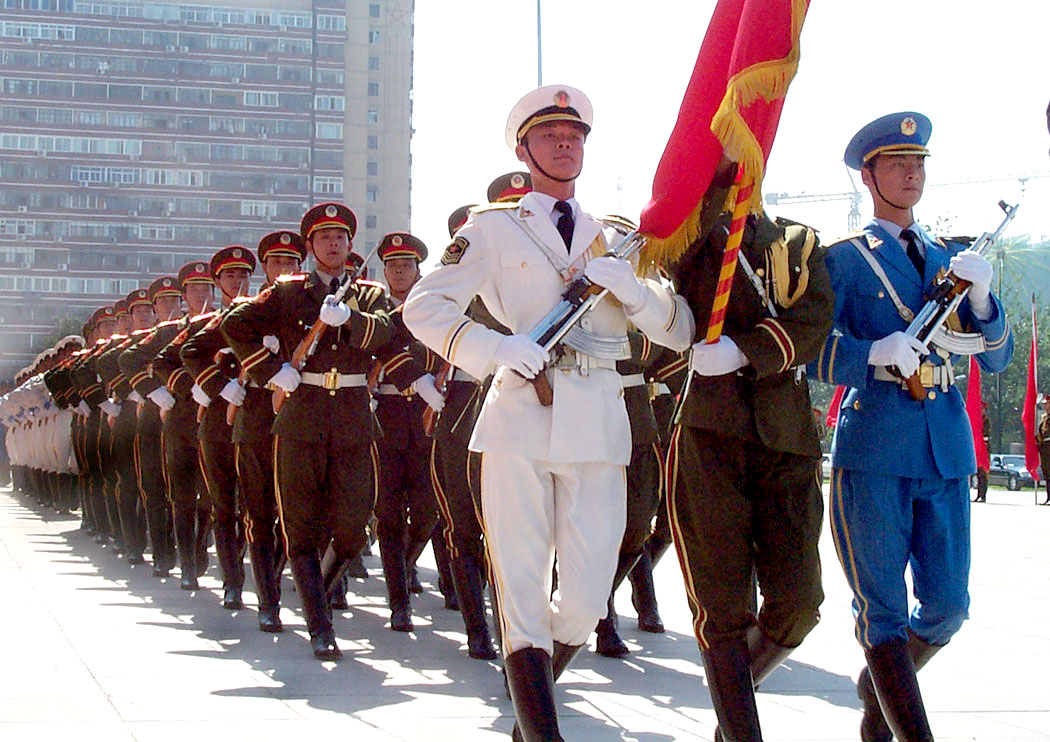
Members of the Beijing Garrison Honor Guard Battalion in the Type 97.

Type 97 Service Dress were the military uniforms used by all branches of the People's Liberation Army (PLA) in both the People's Liberation Army Hong Kong Garrison and People's Liberation Army Macau Garrison beginning in 1997. These uniforms have since been replaced by the new Type 07 series of uniforms, which were unveiled in late June 2007 in conjunction with the 10th anniversary celebrations of the Transfer of sovereignty over Hong Kong.

The uniform was selected to give a more formal and clean image for military personnel in Hong Kong.

== Service uniforms ==
=== Army uniforms ===
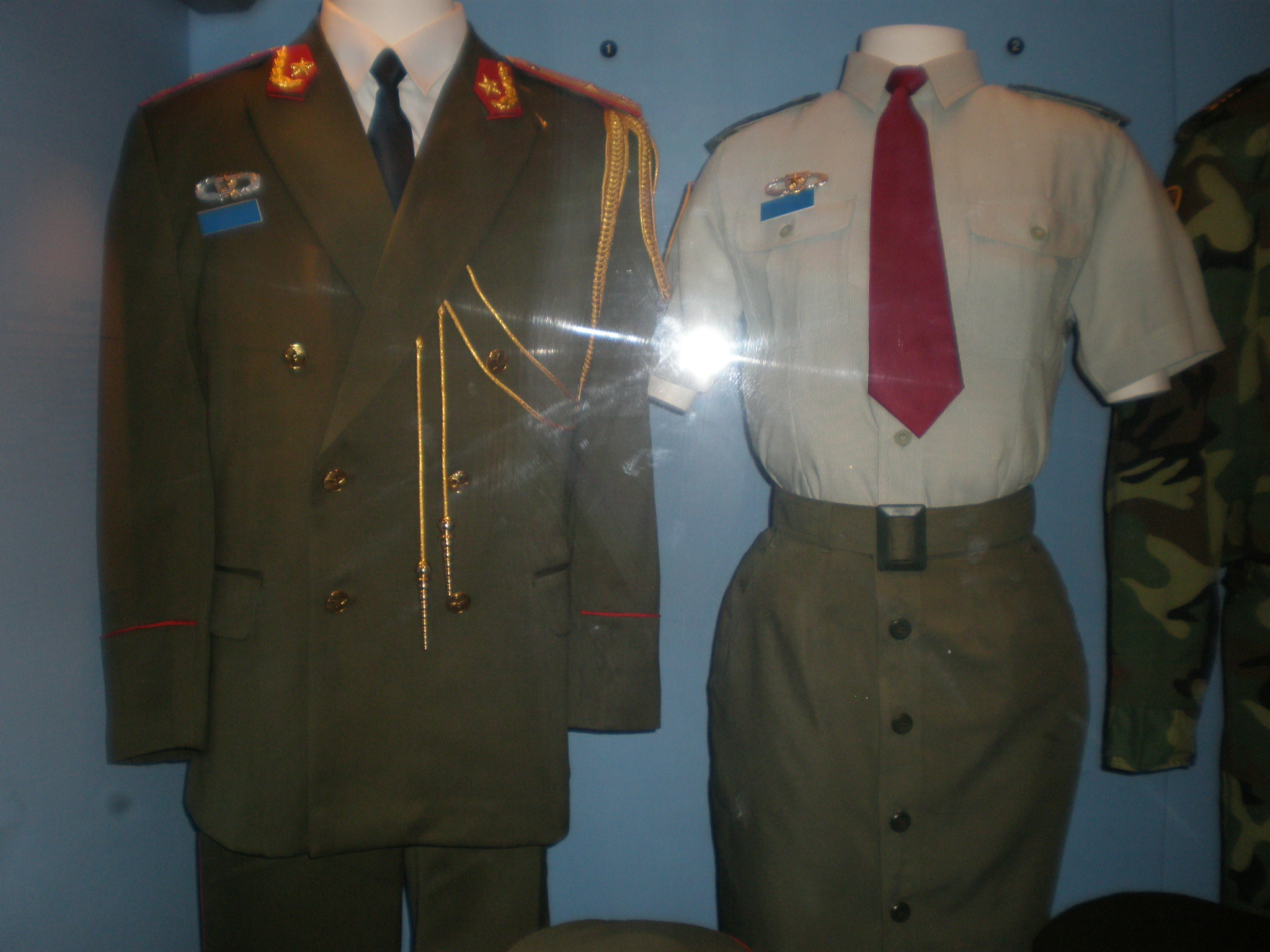
The male and female uniforms for a Major General in the PLA.

The Army variant of the Type 97 service uniform worn by the PLA Ground Force in Hong Kong and Macau featured an olive green colored jacket and blue tie. Olive green service caps and shirts were worn by officers. Formal dress pants continued to have yellow stripes. A lighter green shirt (with shoulder patch), berets and light olive green pants were worn by NCOs. Black boots are worn during formal ceremonies.

=== Navy Uniforms ===
The Type 97 Navy Uniforms had white and navy blue colors, but were still in line with the traditional appearance worn on the Mainland. NCO's wore white shirts with striped collar and blue pants. Black boots were worn during formal ceremonies.

=== Air Force Uniforms ===
The Type 97 Air Force Uniforms had white and blue colors, but were still in line with the traditional appearance worn on the Mainland. Black boots were worn during formal ceremonies.

== Combat & Training Uniforms ==
Combat & Training Uniforms were the older Type 87 Combat & Training Uniforms originally introduced in the 1980s, but introduction of the Type 97 series began to add camouflage after 2000.

== See also ==
Digital camouflage pattern uniforms:

- CADPAT
- Type 07
- Type 87
- MARPAT
- Army Combat Uniform
- Airman Battle Uniform
