= Type 87 =

Type 87 may refer to:

== Military ==
=== 20th century ===
- Type 87 Chi-I, Japanese experimental medium tank of the 1920s
- Type 87 armored car, Japanese version of the Vickers Crossley armoured car
- Type 87 Vixen II, variant of the Vickers Vixen biplane of the 1920s
- German Type U 87 submarine of WWII

=== 20th and 21st century ===
- Type 87 self-propelled anti-aircraft gun, Japanese air defense vehicle
- Type 87 ARV, Japanese armored reconnaissance vehicle
- Type 87 grenade launcher, Chinese infantry weapon
- Type 87 Chu-MAT, Japanese anti-tank missile
- Type 87 assault rifle, a variant of the Chinese Type 81
- Type 87 anti-aircraft gun, a 25mm Chinese copy of the Soviet ZU-23-2
- Type 87 (camouflage), the uniform used by People's Liberation Army during 1987 to 2007
