= Type 99 =

Type 99 may refer to:

- Type 99 tank
- Type 99 (camouflage)
- Type 99 cannon
- Type 99 grenade
- Type 99 light machine gun
- Type 99 rifle
- Type 99 mine
- Type 99 88 mm AA Gun
- Type 99 155 mm self-propelled howitzer
- Kawasaki Army Type 99 Twin-Engine Light Bomber
- Mitsubishi Army Type 99 Light Bomber
- Type 99 air-to-air missile, also has a designation for AAM-4
