= Xingkong (camouflage) =

Chinese military camouflage pattern

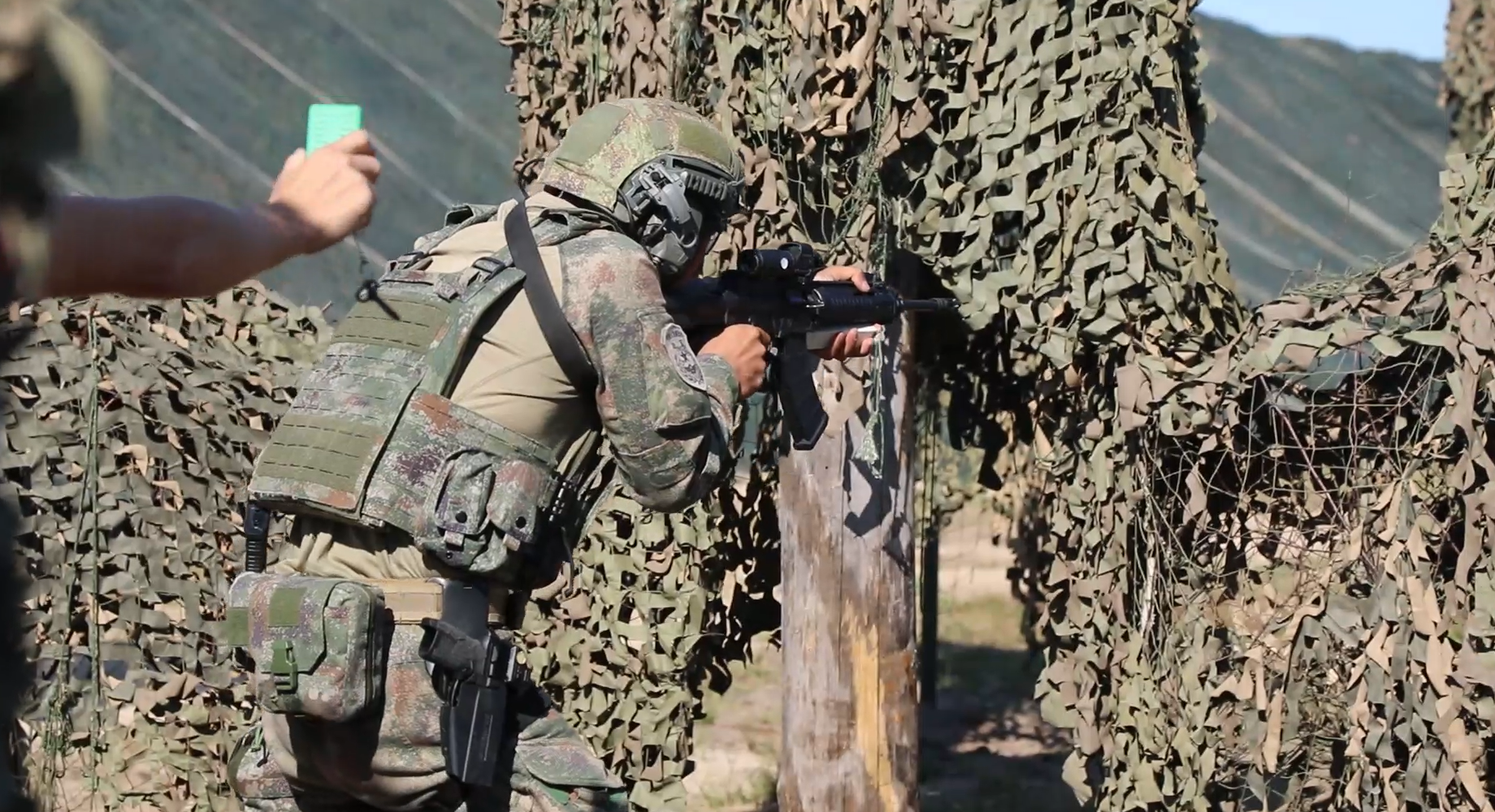
- A PLAGF SF wearing Type 19 uniform with Xingkong jungle pattern during a special operations demonstration
- Type: Military camouflage pattern
- Place of origin: China

Service history
- In service: 2019
- Used by: People's Liberation Army

Production history
- Designer: Jiangsu Casdilly Dress
- Designed: 2016
- Produced: 2016-present

Xingkong (Chinese: 星空; lit. 'Starry sky'), is a military camouflage pattern adopted in 2019 by all branches of the People's Liberation Army (PLA) of the People's Republic of China (PRC). Introduced in 2019, the Xingkong pattern replaced the Type 07 camouflage on the Type 07 combat uniforms used by regular units. The new uniform and Xingkong camouflage were first seen in September 2019, before the celebration ceremony for the 70th anniversary of the People's Republic of China.

The Xingkong camouflage is deployed with the Type 19 and Type 21 uniform series.

== History ==
=== Design ===
Comparison of Type 19 and Type 21 uniforms with Xingkong jungle camouflage pattern

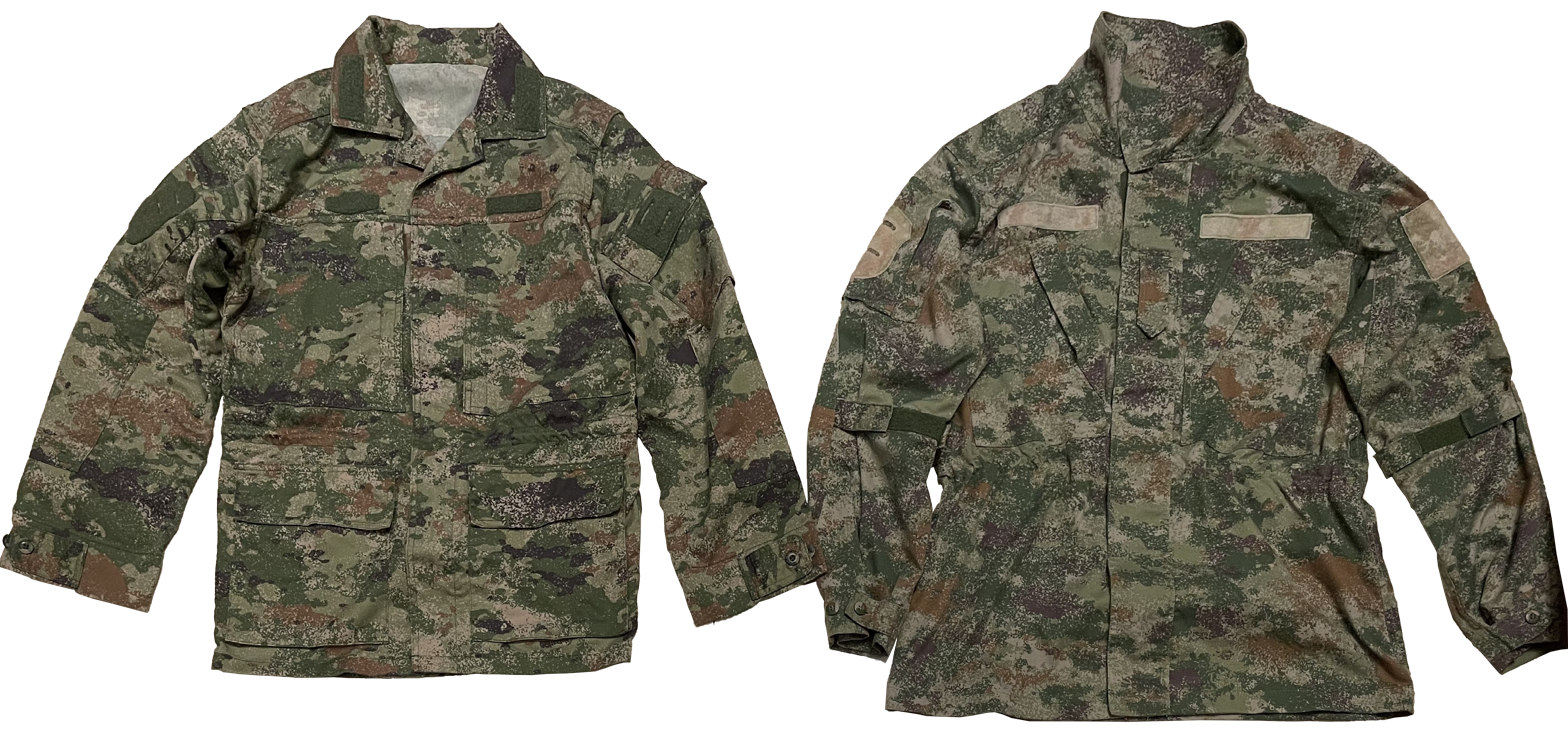
Type 19 (right) and Type 21 (left) blouse

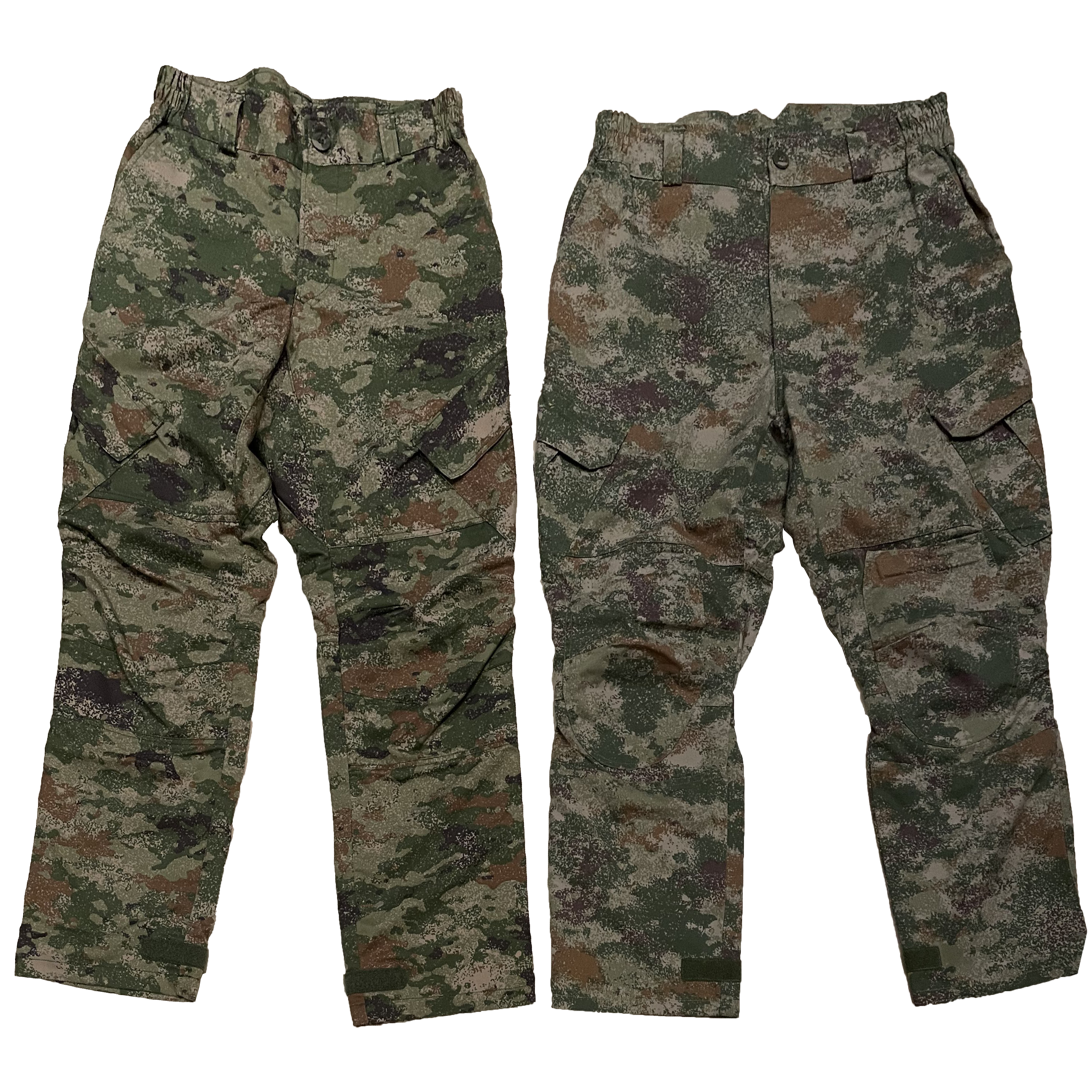
Type 19 (right) trousers and Type 21 (left) trousers

The new uniform is available with five different camouflage patterns. Colors are no longer service-based. The uniform has fastening hoops for the wrist, elbow, ankle and knee, which prevents a soldier wearing the uniform being affected by vegetation or terrain during travel. The uniform has internal slots for elbow and knee pads.

The pocket on the uniform is designed to open sideways, for access after equipping a tactical vest. The complementary tactical vest has improved structural and material design, offering better mobility, practicality, fire-resistance, and protection.

Color customization for the uniform accessories is achieved with the new design. Urban, woodland, and jungle camouflage is fitted with black-colored gloves and boots, while desert and tundra have colored ones. Camouflaged pouches and devices can be attached to the tactical vest.

The new pattern has better concealment in variable distances compared to traditional digital camouflage, due to the utilizing of unrecognizable tiny digital grids. It has dots or stars in the fabric that are smaller than those in the Type 07 digital camouflage.

=== Fielding ===
According to Senior Colonel Wu Qian, Director General of the Information Office of the Chinese Ministry of National Defense, the camo's distribution to the entire PLA is going as scheduled in an October 31, 2019 announcement.

The Xingkong is expected to be distributed with helmets, tactical gloves, combat vests and military boots.

== Variants ==
There are five variants of pattern for Xingkong camouflage.

Woodland
Brown and green colored digital camouflage.
Jungle
Jungle green colored digital camouflage.
Desert
Light sand colored digital camouflage.
Arid
Also called Wasteland and Tundra by some sources. Dark sand colored digital camouflage.
Urban
Dark grey colored digital camouflage.

== Gallery ==
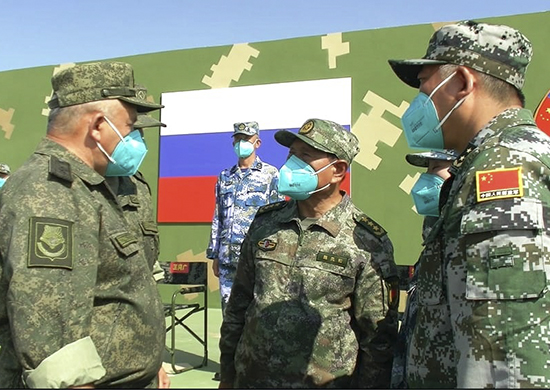
Russian and Chinese officers at Sibu/Interaction-2021 military exercises. From left to right: Russian office uniform with EMR camouflage, Type 19 office uniform with Xingkong camouflage, Type 07 camouflage uniform

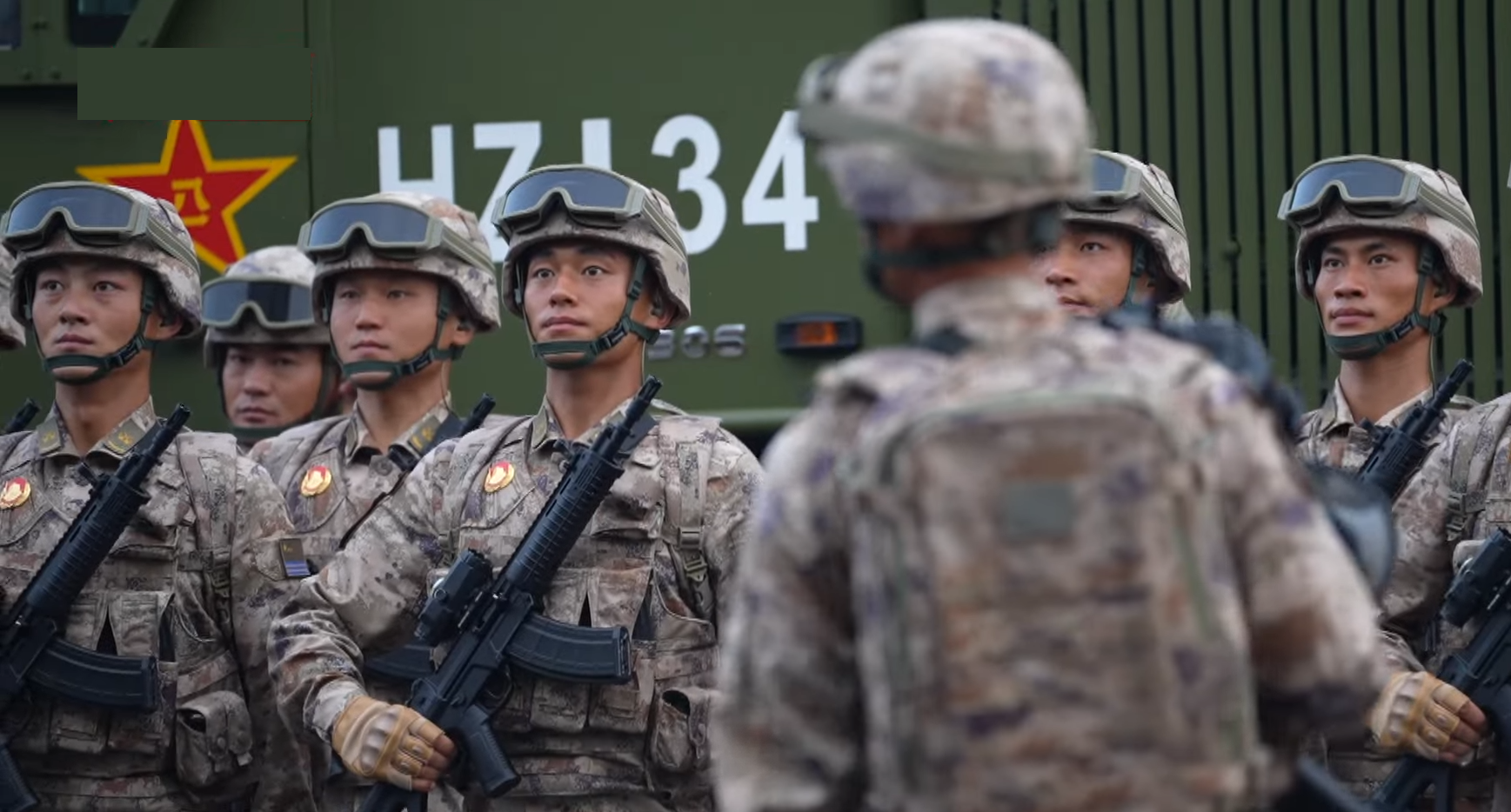
Chinese Marines in Type 21 uniforms at the 2025 China Victory Day Parade
