= Baicheng Ordnance Test Center of China =

Weapons testing unit of the People's Liberation Army

- 中国白城兵器试验中心
- Active: 1954 -
- Country: People's Republic of China
- Allegiance: Chinese Communist Party
- Branch: People's Liberation Army Ground Force
- Type: Weapons Testing Center
- Size: Corps
- Garrison/HQ: Baicheng City, Jilin Province

Commanders
- Commander: Major General Zeng Fanji (曾凡吉)
- Political Commissar: Major General Li Guangbin (李广彬)

The Baicheng Ordnance Test Center of China, also known as the People's Liberation Army (PLA) 31st Testing and Training Base (MUCD Unit 63850), is a subordinate Corps Grade unit of the People's Liberation Army Ground Force (PLAGF) based in Pingtai County, Taobei District, Baicheng City, Jilin Province. It is a multi-functional weapons equipment test range in China, serving as a national target range. Most conventional small weapons and equipment of the People's Republic of China (PRC) are tested and finalized by the center before being inducted by the army. The center is responsible for research and testing of China's conventional weapons and equipment, including finalization, appraisal, scientific research, production delivery, testing, and preparation of firing ranges.

== Foundation ==
In September 1953, the Central Military Commission(CMC) approved the construction of the PLA Ordnance Test Range in the Dacaodian area of Baicheng, Jilin Province, to undertake the performance assessment of ground artillery, infantry weapons, and weapon type tests. On August 26, 1954, the Ordnance Test Range was officially established. It was one of the 156 key projects built by the Soviet Union as part of their aid to China. The range was approved by Zhou Enlai, Liu Shaoqi, and Peng Dehuai.

In early September 1954, the first batch of personnel went to the horqin grassland for construction. Within this team, the light weapons unit established the test apparatus and learned test methods under guidance of Soviet expert A. Volkov. In April 1956, the range was renamed the First Ordnance Scientific Test Range of the PLA, which belonged to the General Armaments Department, with Maj. Gen. Zhang Yixiang as the director, Maj. Gen. Li Kungliang as the political commissar, Maj. Gen. Zheng Helin as the deputy political commissar, and Maj. Gen. Liu Zhirui as the deputy director.

From September 8 to October 24, 1955, a factory in northeast China sent batches of pistols to the range for product quality inspection tests. On June 9, 1956, the range held an opening ceremony. The first environmental simulation laboratory was completed in 1958. In July 1960, the Soviet experts withdrew, but that did not affect the construction of the range.

== Early History ==
In March 1959, Han Zhenji (韩振纪) was appointed director of the PLA General Logistics Department's Ordnance Department. The department took over the daily operations of Baicheng Range. The General Staff Department of the PLA was responsible for arranging the testing of weapons by all military branches. The deputy chiefs of staff in charge of this work were Zhang Aiping and Peng Shaohui. A decision was made by Han Zenji and the General Staff Department that the Baicheng range should report to the General Logistics Department Party Committee in order to strengthen the range's testing capabilities and comprehensive utilization.

After research by a team of experts from the General Logistics Department, a plan was put forward to extend the main target road so that the range could meet the requirements of anti-aircraft weapons and other long-range weapons testing. The plan was implemented after approval by the State Council and the CMC. The expansion was completed in 1960, during the period known as the Great Leap Forward, increasing the range's total area to 1,795 square kilometers.

At the beginning of 1960, the national defense industry began large-scale construction of the Third Front, and the CMC decided to build a new weapons testing ground in northwest China. Zhenji sent specialists to study the decision of the CMC and participate in site selection. After argumentation, Enlai approved the construction of the second test site, which was subordinate to the Baicheng base in terms of establishment. This became the China Huayin Weapons Testing Center.

On March 22 and July 10, 1961, Zhenji attended the All-Army Logistics Work Conference and All-Army Logistics Work Symposium organized by the General Logistics Department. He discussed practicing thrift and frugality in building up the army. He then convened the Party Committee of the Ordnance Department to study the issue of self-sufficiency. Subsequently, it was decided to build a farm in the Baicheng firing range that could provide for the unit.

In August 1963, the CMC made a special report to Enlai, Deng Xiaoping and the Secretariat of the Chinese Communist Party on the tasks of the Baicheng Range. They planned to build the Baicheng Range into a comprehensive test base with the Army's conventional weapon tests as the main focus, taking into account the naval and air force's tests for some of their conventional weapons. The General Staff Department, the General Logistics Department, the Air Force, the Navy, the Artillery, and the Armored Corps formed the Conventional Weapons Test Base Planning Group to formulate a plan and a phased construction program, which was approved by the Central Committee of the CCP in December 1963.

In January 1964, the CMC decided to change the name of the range to Ordinance Scientific Research and Test Base. In November 1964, the name was changed again to Conventional Weapons Test Base. The base was then assigned to the National Defense Science and Industry Commission (NDSC), and in 1998, was transferred to the General Armaments Department of the PLA.

At the beginning of the Cultural Revolution, the range's scientific research became stagnant, and most cadres were dispatched to carry out the four clean-ups, with officers being sent down for revolutionary education, and army units sent to support left actions and take military control of areas of struggle. Development work stopped due to the closure of colleges and universities across the country, which led to the inability to replenish the technical force. It was not until 1971, in the middle and late stages of the Cultural Revolution, that the situation improved.

After the 2015 Military Reforms, the Armaments Department was abolished and the base passed under the direct control of the PLAGF.

== Organization ==
- Engineering Department (技术部)
- Light Arms Testing Department (轻武器试验部)
