= Type 07 =

Standard dress uniform of the People's Liberation Army of China

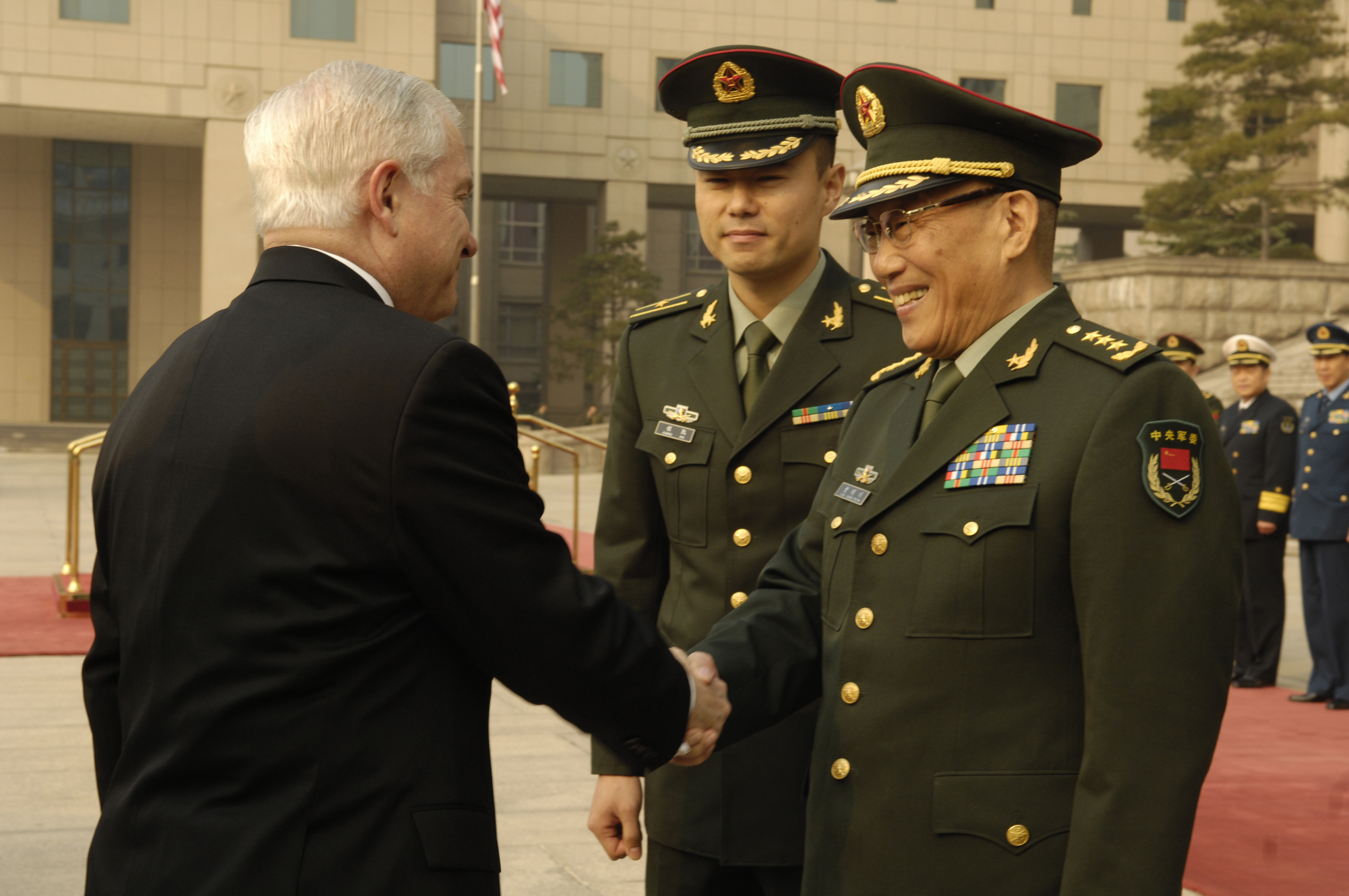
General Cao Gangchuan (right, foreground) in a Type 07 dress uniform

Type 07 (Chinese: “零七”式军服，“07”式军服) is a group of military uniforms used by all branches of the People's Liberation Army (PLA) of the People's Republic of China (PRC) and the paramilitary Chinese People's Armed Police Force.

== History ==
Introduced in 2007, the Type 07 uniforms replaced the Type 87 service uniforms used by regular units and the Type 97 Service Dress uniforms of the People's Liberation Army Hong Kong Garrison and the People's Liberation Army Macau Garrison. The Type 07 uniforms were first seen in late June 2007 during a celebration ceremony for the 10th anniversary of the Transfer of sovereignty over Hong Kong.

The combat uniforms are slated to be replaced by newer Type 19 uniform with the Xingkong camouflage pattern.

== Service uniforms ==
The design of the Type 07 uniform, especially that of the dress uniform, borrowed from older designs. The older designs, in turn, were influenced by those of the Soviet Union. The Type 07 design has striped cuff insignia which indicate years of service. The stripe cuff insignia are worn by all commissioned officers except for naval admirals and officers who use sleeve insignia on their dress blues.

=== Army uniforms ===
In 2007, the Type 07 uniforms were adopted by the People's Liberation Army Ground Force and other unbranched units. They replaced the Type 87 uniform and the Type 97 uniforms used by the garrison troops in Hong Kong and Macau. The Type 07 uniform made its debut in late June 2007 at a ceremony to celebrate the 10th anniversary of Hong Kong's return to China.

Since the mid-1980s, the army's uniforms had been olive green. The Type 07 uniforms, in contrast, are pine green. The insignias of all Ranks of the People's Liberation Army are placed on green backgrounds. The old standing-collar winter service uniform was abandoned in favour of an open-collar design.

=== Navy uniforms ===
The Type 07 naval uniforms replaced the Type 87 and Type 97 naval uniforms. The Type 07 naval uniforms adopt white and navy blue as their basic colours. Officers receive two service uniforms, an all-white single-breasted design with the traditional shoulder rank insignia for summer wear and a double-breasted navy blue design with cuff insignia for winter wear.

=== Air Force uniforms ===
The Type 07 Air Force uniform replaced the Type 05 Air Force Service uniform of the regular airmen and the Type 97 Air Force Service uniform of the PLA garrison troops in Hong Kong and Macau. The new Type 07 Air Force uniform inherited the "Air Force Blue" color of the Type 05 Air Force Service uniform. All rank insignias are placed on blue backgrounds. The old standing-collar winter service uniform was abandoned in favor of an open-collar design.

=== Rocket Forces uniforms ===
The Second Artillery Corps was elevated to the separate People's Liberation Army Rocket Force in December 2015. The new branch adopted distinct uniforms in 2016. The new Rocket Forces uniform is cut in the same pattern as the Ground Force and Air Force service uniforms, but use a distinct dark green color, worn with a khaki shirt, instead of the lighter pine green color and light green shirt of Ground Force uniforms.

=== Armed Police Force uniforms ===
As a branch of the armed forces of PRC, the People's Armed Police Force also adopted a Type 07 uniform. The uniform is cut in a similar pattern as the PLA Ground Force service uniform, in a dark olive green color and worn with a light green shirt. The insignias of ranks are placed on the same dark olive green backgrounds for officers, red for enlisted personnel.

== Combat uniforms and armor ==
=== Uniforms ===
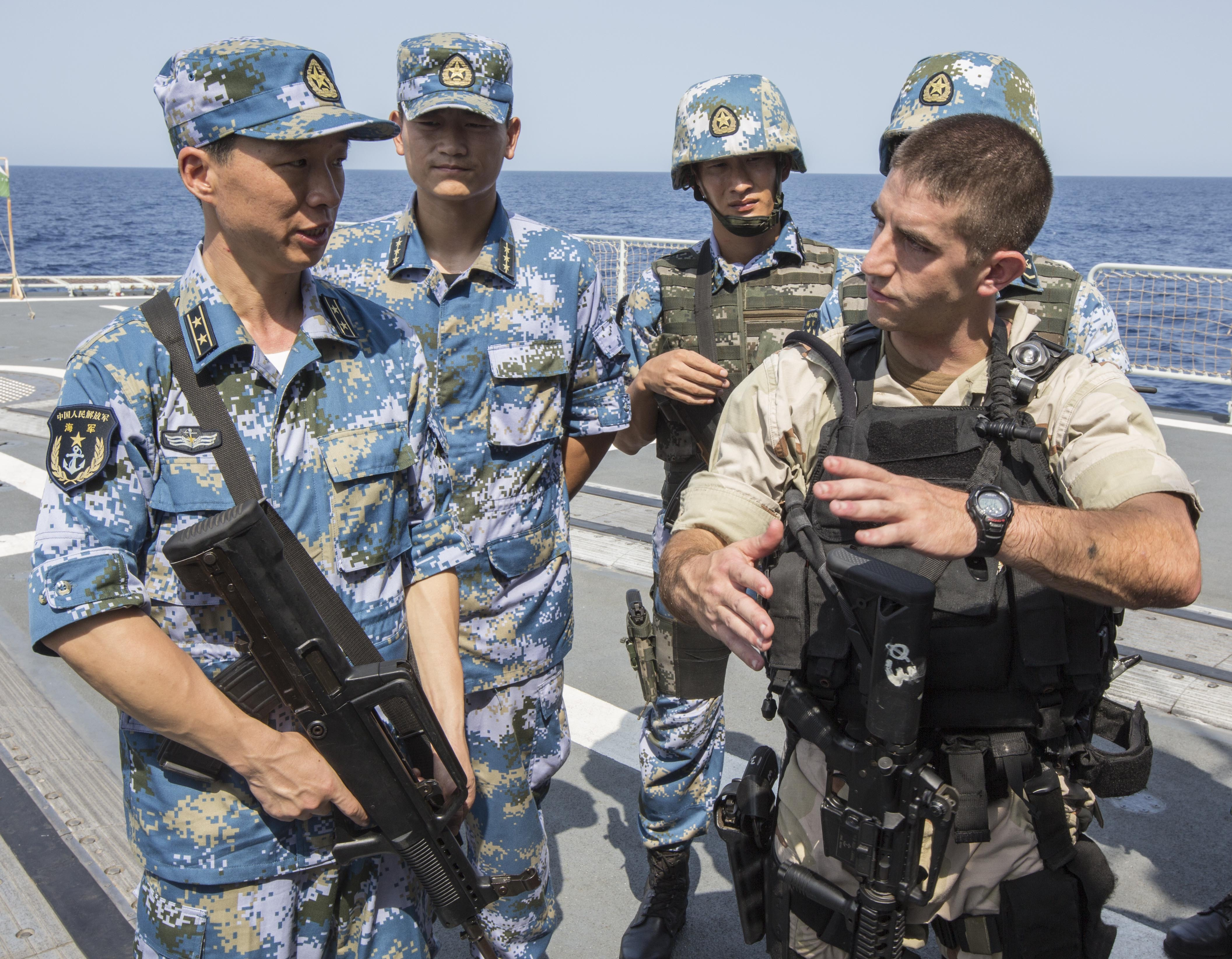
Chinese sailors wearing the "Ocean" type uniform

In 2007, the PLA introduced the Type 07 combat and training uniforms to replace the Type 87 combat and training uniforms which dated to the 1980s. The uniform includes a winter style made of heavy-weighted cotton fabric material and a summer style made of polyester and cotton twill fabric. Both styles include a coat, trousers, a soft cap and black leather boots.

The summer uniform has a coat, with cuffed sleeves, a soft turndown collar, two breast pockets, two hip pockets, and an arm pocket on the left sleeve. Trousers have two hip pockets and two cargo pockets on legs. A pair of cloth rank insignia (light yellow on olive drab for army, light yellow on medium blue for air force, and light yellow on navy blue for navy) with velcro is worn on the collars. The service branch cloth badge (military commission headquarters, army, air force, navy, Second Artillery Corps/Rocket Force, and People's Armed Police) is worn above the right chest pocket. The unit shield badge (of which there are thirty-seven types) is carried on the right sleeve pocket. During a multi-national event, a cloth nametag with both simplified Chinese and English text is worn above the left chest pocket and the PRC flag color patch may be worn above the left sleeve pocket. However, the navy special operations unit wears the PLA naval ensign flag color patch on their combat uniform. Enlisted and junior commanding personnel also receive a set of wicking T-shirt (either in green or camouflage) and shorts for physical fitness training in summer. Physical fitness training isn't required for senior officers.

The winter uniform (coat and trousers) is made of thicker heavy-weighted cotton material with front zipper flap. The outer jacket with a fur-collar has an inner lining of quilted polyester padding and a detachable hood for warmth. A fur cap with earflaps and gloves are also available for extreme cold operations.

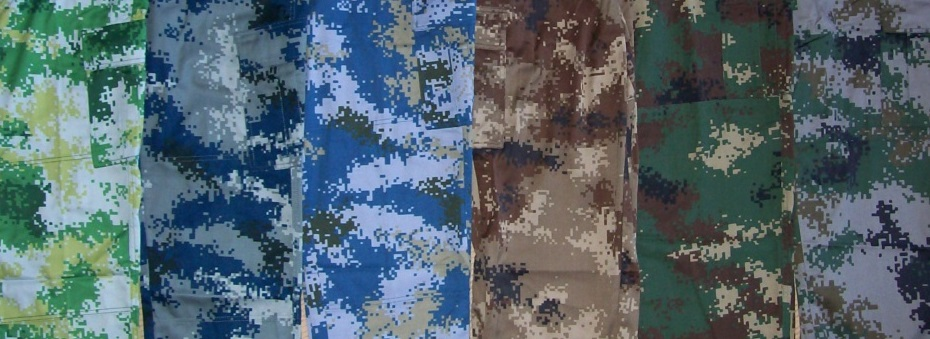
Some variants of type 07 camouflage patterns. From right to left: Universal, Woodland/Jungle, Desert/Arid, Oceanic, Urban/Air Force, OpFor Green.

The Type 07 combat and training uniform was made in four basic camouflage patterns, each in a four-color scheme. These were a universal pattern (most common); a desert pattern (used by troops in Tibet and border guards near Russia in the northeast in winter); a woodland pattern (used by Second Artillery Forces in dense forest regions); and an ocean pattern (used by naval special combat units).

- "Universal" (official name: 07 Universal Camouflage, "07式通用迷彩作训服"): green, brown and black on a grey background. This pattern was designed for semi-urban terrain. It was the standard pattern for the PLA army and airforce.
- "Desert" (official name: 07 Arid Camouflage, "07式荒漠迷彩作训服"): light khaki, dark brown, and black on a tan background. The pattern was designed for desert or arid terrain but was used in the winter of north China.
- "Woodland" (official name: 07 Woodland Camouflage, "07式林地迷彩作训服"): light yellow, medium brown, and black on an olive green background. The woodland pattern was designed for use in dense bush terrain or jungle. It was used by the PLA Rocket Forces then superseded.
- "Ocean" (official name: 07 Oceanic Camouflage, "07式海洋迷彩作训服"): light blue, green, and light khaki on a medium blue background. The ocean pattern was used in limited quantities in for instance the marine corps. now this camouflage is used by all naval vessel crew.
- "Navy blue": was the plain dark blue colour used by all naval vessel crew, has been abandoned now.
- "Special Operations Forces camo" (official name: 07 Special Operations Forces Camouflage, "07式特战迷彩作训服"): also called the "hunter digital camo"(Chinese: 猎人数码迷彩). It is a pixelated design of the Type 04 special forces DPM camouflage used since 2010 by reconnoitre units and special forces. It was first used by the 38th Group Army special operations unit.
- "Urban" (official name: 07 Urban Camouflage, "07式城市迷彩作训服"): (also known as PLAAF digital camouflage), dark green, light grey, and bluish-grey on a slate-gray background. The pattern was first used by the air force in November 2011. Sometimes been unofficially called "Air Force Camouflage".

There are two variants of Type 07 Camouflage for People's Armed Police (PAP) personnel:

- "PAP Summer Camouflage" ("07式武警夏季作训服"): Based on Type 06 PAP camouflage pattern, brown, black, and light green on an olive green background, being phased out by a new pixelated design adopted in 2015.
- "PAP Winter Camouflage" ("07式武警冬季作训服"): Based on Type 06 PAP winter camouflage pattern, green, brown, black, on a tan colored background, being phased out by a new pixelated design adopted in 2015.

Because of the complex commanding structure of the PAP, there were many modifications to PAP Type 07 camouflaged uniforms.

There are also Type 07 camouflage pattern variants for OpFor units during military exercises, such as the 07 Woodland Camouflage variant and 07 Oceanic Camouflage in brighter and lighter color tones.

Chinese Armed Forces will introduce irregular camouflage patterns for special occasions, for example, the military parade of the 60th National Day on 1 October 2009.

- "Airborne Camouflage" was used by the PLAAF 15th Airborne Corps formation at the 60th National Day. The pattern was sky blue, green, greyish green and light greyish blue, has been abandoned now.
- "07 Aviation Camouflage" ("07式航空迷彩作训服") was used by the PLAAF 15th Airborne Corps formation personnel during their preparation training before the 60th National Day military parade. The pattern was sky blue, light yellow, reddish-brown, white on a greyish blue background. After the parade, some PLA Air Force personnel were seen wearing this pattern for a short period. The pattern also been unofficially called "Type 09 Air Force Camouflage".
- "Second Artillery Corps Camouflage" was a variant of the Type 07 woodland pattern which used reddish-brown instead of dark brown, it has been abandoned now.

=== Body armor ===
In 2010, the PLA introduced a new series of body armor, including tactical vests as well as additional elbow guards, shoulder pads and knee pads. The armor set utilizes Type 07 style digital camouflage pattern.

== Users ==
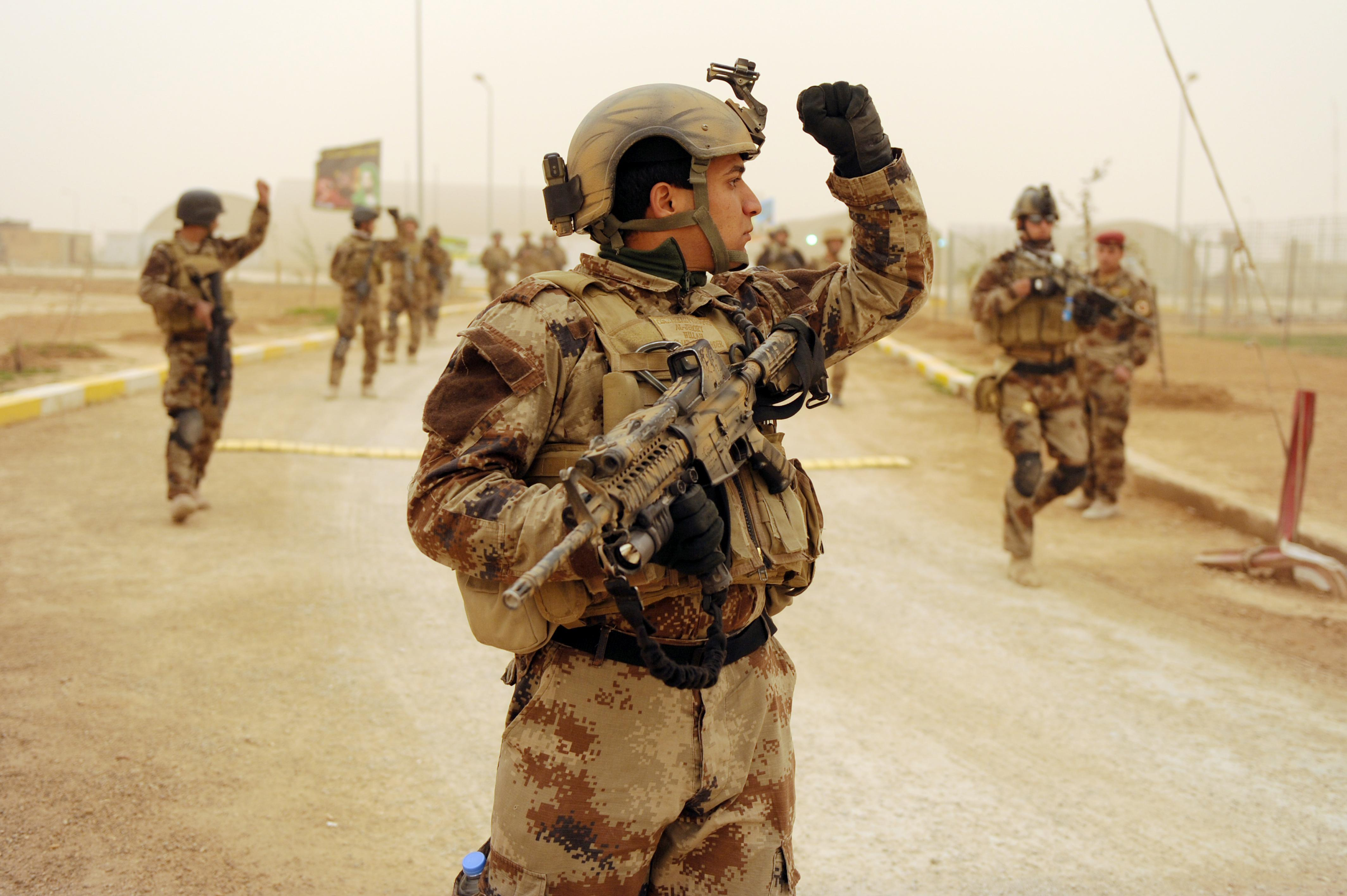
Iraqi Special Operations Forces operator with Type 07 camouflage uniform

- China: All branches of the People's Liberation Army. Being replaced by Xingkong.
- Iraq: Type 07 “arid” pattern is used by Iraqi Special Operations Forces.

== See also ==
- Xingkong

== Bibliography ==
- Larson, Eric H. (2021). Camouflage: International Ground Force Patterns, 1946–2017. Barnsley: Pen & Sword. ISBN 9781526739537.
