= People's Liberation Army Ground Force =

Chinese land warfare service branch

- 中国人民解放军陆军
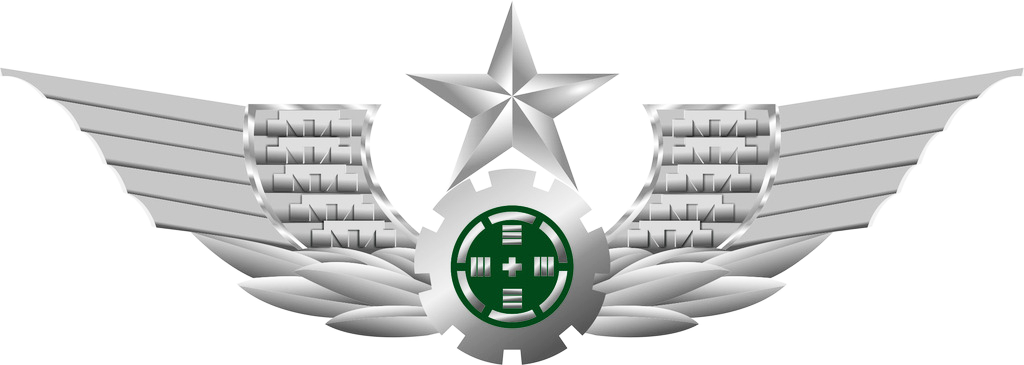
- Emblem of the People's Liberation Army Ground Force
- Founded: 1 August 1927; 99 years ago
- Country: China
- Allegiance: Chinese Communist Party
- Type: Army
- Role: Land warfare
- Size: 960,000 active personnel (2025)
- Part of: People's Liberation Army
- Headquarters: Central Military Commission
- Mottos: "Serve the people!" (Chinese: 为人民服务) "Follow the Party! Fight to win! Forge exemplary conduct!" (Chinese: 听党指挥、能打胜仗、作风优良)
- Colors: Red; Green
- March: March of the People's Liberation Army Ground Force
- Anniversaries: 1 August annually
- Equipment: List of PLAGF equipment
- Engagements: Chinese Civil War (1927-37, 1945-49); Second Sino Japanese War (1937-45); Korean War (1950-53); Campaign at the China–Burma border (1960-61); Sino-Indian War (1962); Vietnam War (1962-75); Nathu La and Cho La clashes (1967); Sino-Soviet border conflict (1969); Sino-Vietnamese War (1979); Sino-Vietnamese conflicts 1979-90 (1979-90); 1999 East Timorese crisis; Northern Mali conflict (2012–23); South Sudanese Civil War (2013-20); 2020–2021 China–India skirmishes (2020–21)

Commanders
- Commander: General Vacant
- Political Commissar: General Vacant
- Chief of Staff: General Cai Zhijun

Insignia
- Symbol

- Flag

- Sleeve badge

Chinese name
- Traditional Chinese: 中國人民解放軍陸軍
- Simplified Chinese: 中国人民解放军陆军
Transcriptions
Standard Mandarin
- Hanyu Pinyin: Zhōngguó Rénmín Jiěfàngjūn Lùjūn
- Bopomofo: ㄓㄨㄥˉ ㄍㄨㄛˊ ㄖㄣˊ ㄇㄧㄣˊ ㄐㄧㄝˇ ㄈㄤˋ ㄐㄩㄣˉ ㄌㄨˋ ㄐㄩㄣˉ
- Wade–Giles: Chung^{1}-kuo^{2} Jen^{2}-min^{2} Chieh^{3}-fang^{4}-chün^{1} Lu^{4}-chün^{1}
- Tongyong Pinyin: Jongguó Rénmín Jiěfàngjūn Lùjūn
- Yale Romanization: Jūnggwó Rénmín Jyěfàngjyūn Lùhjyūn
- IPA: [ʈʂʊ́ŋkwǒ ɻə̌nmǐn tɕjèfâŋtɕýn lûtɕýn]
other Mandarin
- Xiao'erjing: ژْوڭقُو رِنْمِنْجِيَ فَانْجُنْ لُوجُنْ
Wu
- Suzhounese: Tson^{1}-kueq^{7} Gnin^{2}-min^{2} Cia^{3}-faon^{5}-ciun^{1} Loq^{8}-ciun^{1}
Hakka
- Romanization: Chûng-koet Ngìn-mìn Ká-fong Kién-liuk Kién
Yue: Cantonese
- Jyutping: zung1 gwok3 jan4 man4 gaai2 fong3 gwan1 luk6 gwan1
- IPA: [tsʊŋ˥kʷɔk̚˧ jɐn˩mɐn˩ kaj˧˥fɔŋ˧kʷɐn˥ lʊk̚˨kʷɐn˥]
Southern Min
- Hokkien POJ: Tiong-kok Lîn-bîn Kiat-hòng-kun La̍k-kun
- Tâi-lô: Tiong-kok Lîn-bîn Kiat-hòng-kun La̍k-kun

The People's Liberation Army Ground Force (Note: Chinese: 中国人民解放军陆军; pinyin: Zhōngguó Rénmín Jiěfàngjūn Lùjūn) (PLAGF), also referred to as the PLA Army, is the land warfare service branch of the People's Liberation Army (PLA), and also its largest and oldest branch. The PLAGF traces its lineage to 1927 as the Chinese Red Army; however, it was not officially established until 1948.

== History ==
In February 1949, the existing large number of armies and divisions were regularized into up to seventy armies of three divisions each. While some, such as the 1st Army, survived for over fifty years, a number were quickly amalgamated and disestablished in the early 1950s. It appears that twenty per cent or even more of the seventy new armies were disestablished up to 1953; in 1952 alone, the 3rd, 4th, 10th, 17th, 18th, and 19th Armies were disbanded.

The PLAGF consist of conventionally armed main and regional units, which in 1987 made up over 70 percent of the PLA. It provided a good conventional defense, but in 1987 had only limited offensive potential and was poorly equipped for nuclear, biological, or chemical warfare. Main forces included about 35 group armies, comprising 118 infantry divisions, 13 armored divisions, and 33 artillery and antiaircraft artillery divisions, plus 71 independent regiments and 21 independent battalions of mostly support troops. Regional forces consisted of 73 divisions of border defense and garrison troops plus 140 independent regiments.

Under the old system, a field army consisted of three partially motorized infantry divisions and two regiments of artillery and anti-aircraft artillery. Each field army division had over 12,000 personnel in three infantry regiments, one artillery regiment, one armored regiment, and one anti-aircraft artillery battalion. Organization was flexible, the higher echelons being free to tailor forces for combat around any number of infantry divisions. At least theoretically, each division had its own armor and artillery — actual equipment levels were not revealed and probably varied — and the assets at the army level and within the independent units could be apportioned as needed.

In 1987 the new, main-force group armies typically included 46,300 soldiers in up to four divisions, believed to include infantry, armor, artillery, air defense, airborne, and air support elements. Although the new group armies were supposed to reflect a move to combined-arms operations, because of a lack of mechanization they continued to consist of infantry supported by armor, artillery, and other units. The 13 armored divisions each had 3 regiments and 240 main battle tanks (MBT) but lacked adequate mechanized infantry support.

There was little evidence of the use of armored personnel carriers during the Sino-Vietnamese border conflict in 1979, and tanks were used as mobile artillery and as support for dismounted infantry. Artillery forces emphasized towed guns, howitzers, and truck-mounted multiple rocket launchers. In the 1980s some self-propelled artillery entered service, but the PLA also produced rocket launchers as a cheaper but not totally effective alternative to self-propelled guns. There was a variety of construction equipment, mobile bridging, trucks, and prime movers. A new multiple rocket launcher for scattering antitank mines appeared in 1979, but mine-laying and mine-clearing equipment remained scarce.

Regional forces consisted of full-time PLA troops organized as independent divisions for garrison missions. Garrison divisions were static, artillery-heavy units deployed along the coastline and borders in areas of likely attack. Regional forces were armed less heavily than their main-force counterparts, and they were involved in training the militia. They were the PLA units commonly used to restore order during the Cultural Revolution. When chairman Mao proclaimed the People's Republic of China on October 1, 1949, the PLAGF was a 4.9 million-strong peasant army. After some time, the demobilization of ill-trained and politically unreliable troops began, resulting in the reduction of army strength.

In the 21st century, the PLAGF are continuing to undergo significant reform, experimentation, modernization, and restructuring to deal with potential threats and enhance their capabilities. Divisions are downsized into combined arms brigades, which reorganized into high-readiness army groups. The division echelon is phased out with only a limited number of division structures remaining existent. While the size of the PLA Ground Force has been reduced over the past few decades, technology-intensive elements such as special operations forces (SOF), army aviation (helicopters), surface-to-air missiles (SAMs), and electronic warfare units have all been rapidly expanded.

The latest operational doctrine of the PLAGF highlights the importance of information technology, electronic and information warfare, and long-range precision strikes in future warfare. The older generation telephone/radio-based command, control, and communications (C3) systems are being replaced by integrated battlefield information networks featuring local/wide-area networks (LAN/WAN), satellite communications, unmanned aerial vehicle (UAV)-based surveillance and reconnaissance systems, and mobile command and control centers.

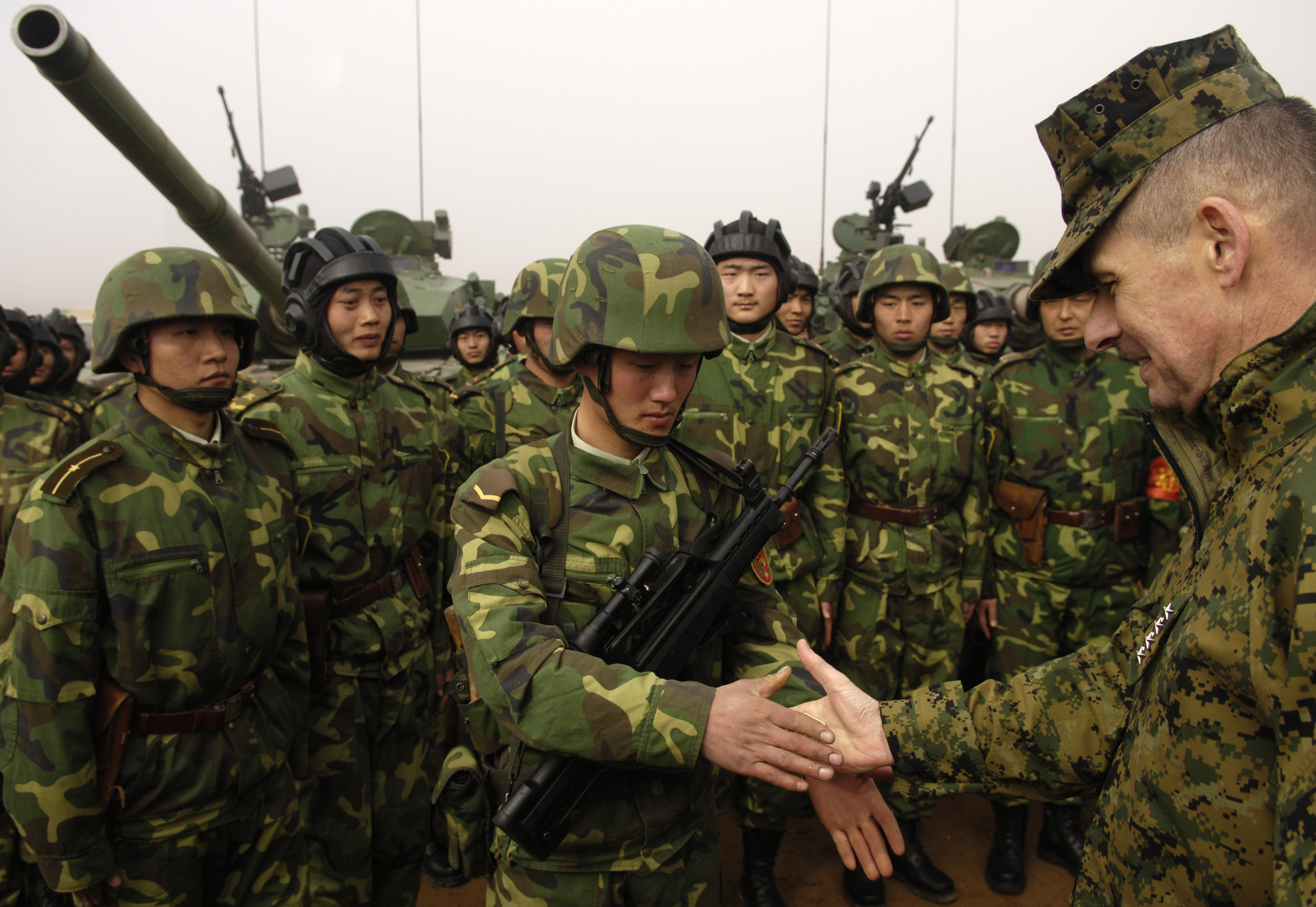
Chairman of the Joint Chiefs of Staff Peter Pace shakes hands with Chinese tankers at Shenyang in 2007

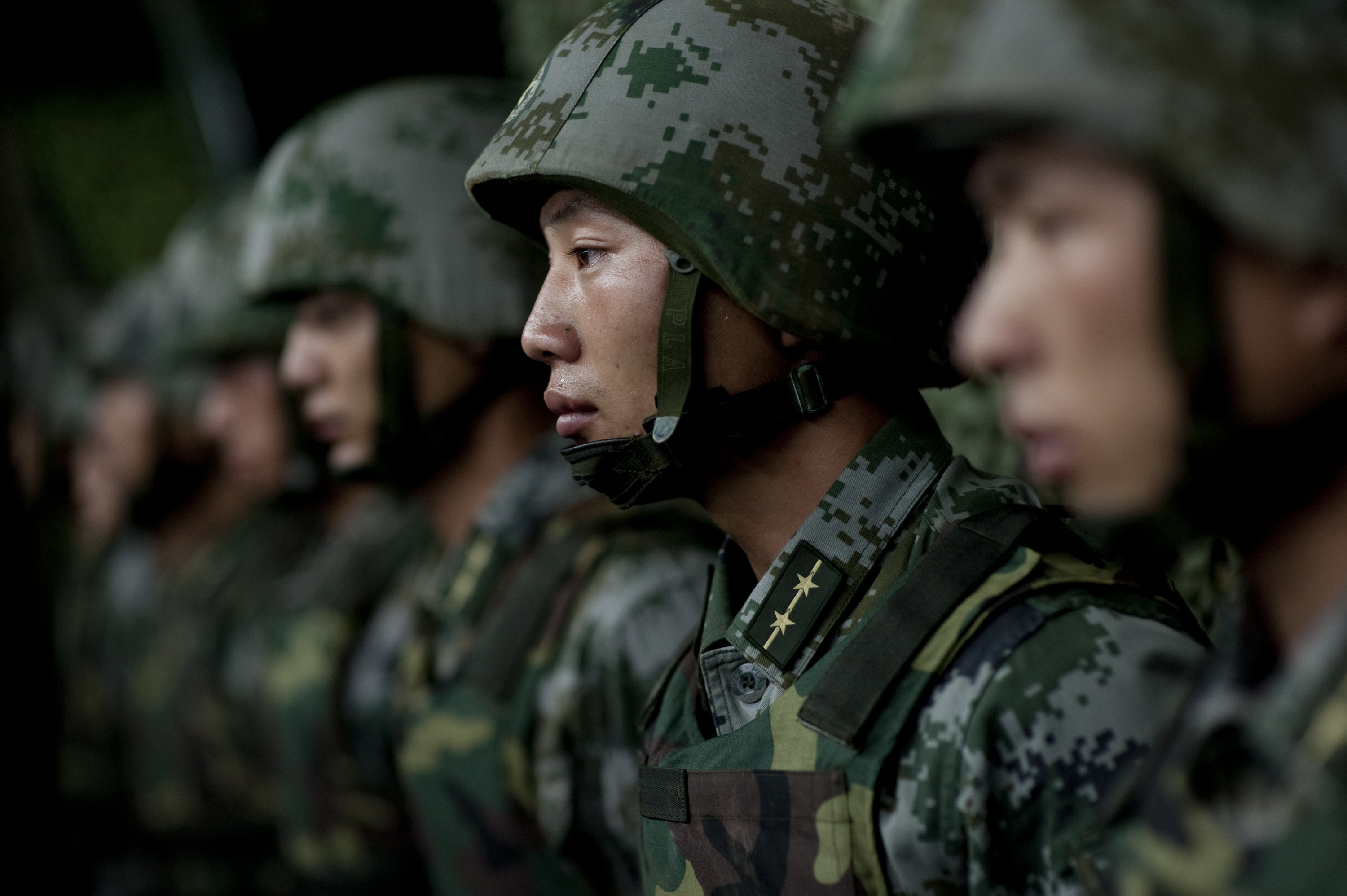
Soldiers of the People's Liberation Army Ground Force in 2011

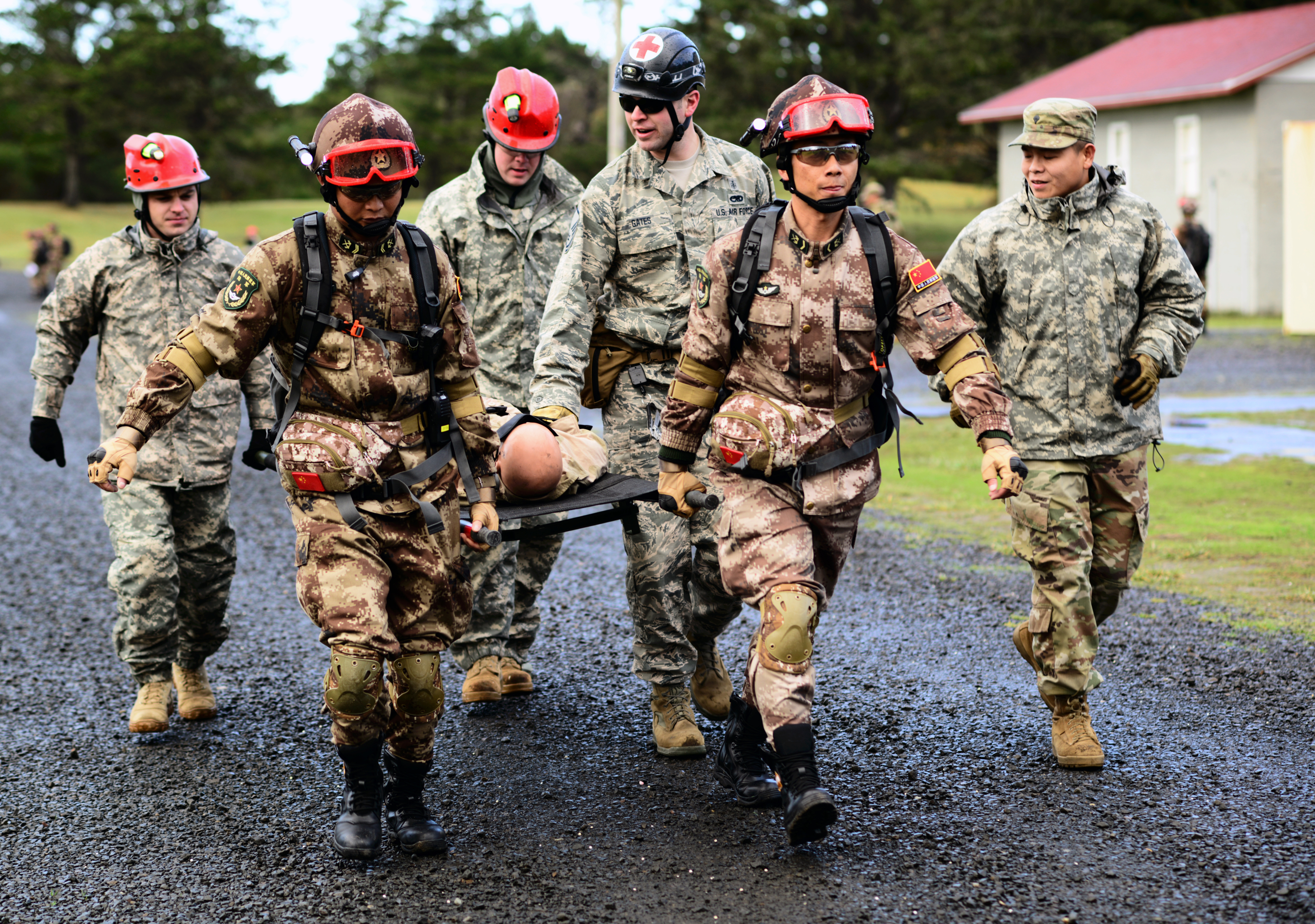
PLAGF and Oregon National Guard work alongside during a disaster response exercise in 2017

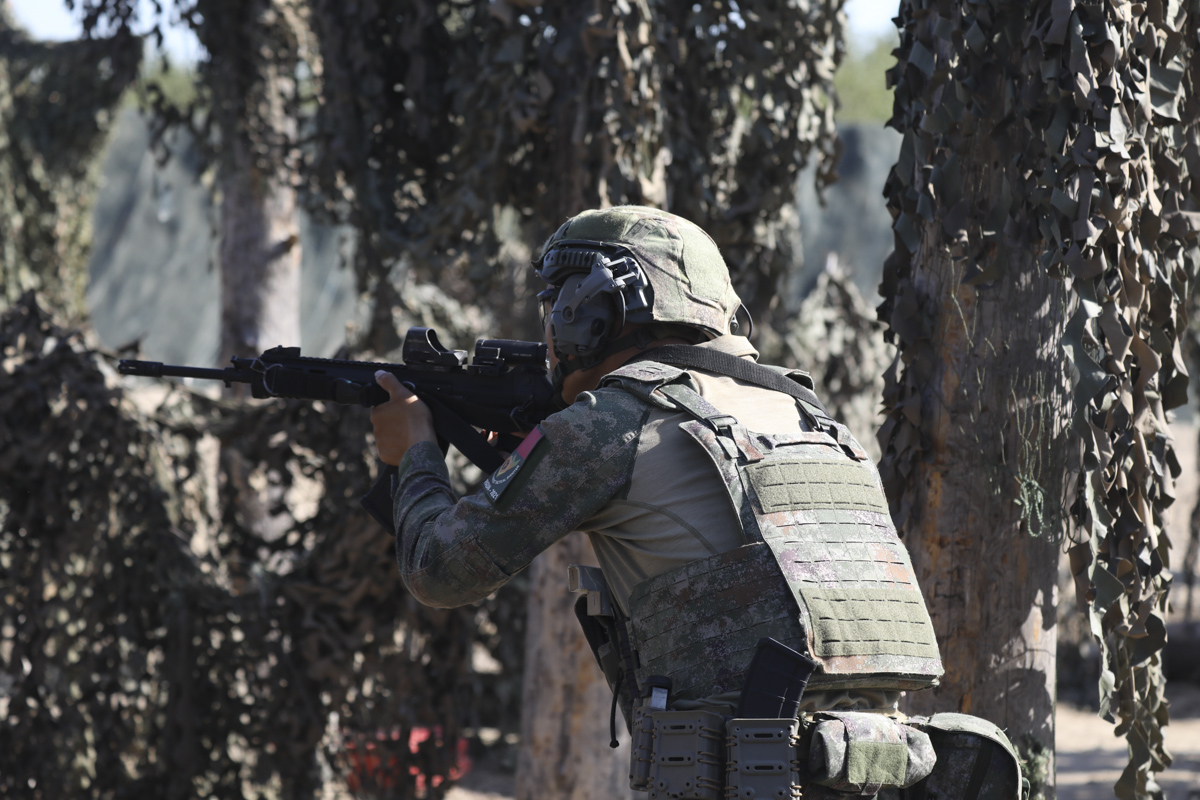
PLAGF infantryman at the International Army Games in 2021

== Structure ==
The five theater commands of the PLA

=== Organization ===
Command of the Chinese armed forces is exercised by the Central Military Commission (CMC) through the service headquarters, including PLAGF headquarters, and the theater commands (TC). The PLAGF component in each TC is the Theater Command Army. Both PLAGF and TC headquarters exercise control over operational units in peacetime, with the TC taking complete control wartime. The military-political dual-command structure is present throughout.

Units in sensitive areas, like Beijing, Hong Kong, and Xinjiang, are subordinated directly to PLAGF headquarters.

After the 2017 reforms, the PLAGF Headquarter structure is a follows:

==== Functional Departments ====
- Staff Department (参谋部)
- PLA Ground Force Political Work Department (政治工作部)
- PLA Ground Force Logistics Department (后勤部)
- PLA Ground Force Equipment Department (装备部)
- Supervision Commission (Commission for Discipline Inspection)

==== Theater Command Ground Force Units ====
- Eastern Theater Command
  - 71st Group Army, Xuzhou
  - 72nd Group Army, Huzhou
  - 73rd Group Army, Xiamen
- Southern Theater Command, Nanning
  - 74th Group Army, Huizhou
  - 75th Group Army, Kunming
- Western Theater Command, Lanzhou
  - 76th Group Army, Xining
  - 77th Group Army, Chengdu
- Northern Theater Command, Jinan
  - 78th Group Army, Harbin
  - 79th Group Army, Liaoyang
  - 80th Group Army, Weifang
- Central Theater Command, Shijiazhuang
  - 81st Group Army, Zhangjiakou
  - 82nd Group Army, Baoding
  - 83rd Group Army, Xinxiang

==== Directly Subordinate Military Districts ====
- Xinjiang Military District
- Tibet Military District
- Beijing Garrison

==== Directly Subordinate Units ====
- Baicheng Ordnance Test Center (31st Experimental Research Base)
- Huayin Weapons Testing Center (32nd Experimental Research Base)
- Army Research Institute
- Dog Training Base

==== Subordinate Academic Institutions ====
- Ground Force Command College
- Army Engineering University of the PLA
- Army Infantry College of the PLA
- Army Academy of Armored Forces
- PLA Army Academy of Artillery and Air Defense
- Army Aviation Academy
- Army Special Operations Academy
- Army Academy of Border and Coastal Defence
- Army Institute of NBC Defence
- Army Medical University
- Army Logistics Academy
- Army Military Transportation University

=== Branches of service ===
The PLAGF has a standing regular army and a reserve force. Although conscription is employed in China by law, mandatory military service has not been implemented since 1949, as the People's Liberation Army has been able to recruit sufficient numbers voluntarily. Chinese militia is not a component of the People's Liberation Army, however, they could provide a certain degree of reserve function, which was indicated by "Militia Military Training and Evaluation Outline" released by the People's Liberation Army General Staff Department in 2007. The Militia is however explicitly not part of the formal Reserve since the passing of the 2022 Reservist Law.

PLAGF branches of service (Chinese: 兵种; pinyin: Bīngzhǒng) are composed of light infantry, mechanized infantry, armour, artillery, air defense, aviation, engineering, CBRN, communications, special operations, logistics, reconnaissance, electronic warfare, and unmanned aerial vehicles. These branches of service have their respective military education institutions.

=== Operational structure ===
PLA operational structure reflects China's strategic missions, political environment, and geographical circumstances. There are 13 corps sized group armies (Chinese: 集团军; pinyin: Jítuánjūn, also known as combined corps) since the end of April 2017, divided among five Theater commands — Eastern, Southern, Northern, Western and Central. Within the group armies, the old divisions (Chinese: 师; pinyin: Shī) are being downsized into brigades (Chinese: 旅; pinyin: Lǚ). Each group army includes six maneuver combined arms brigades, fire support/artillery brigades, air defense brigades, aviation brigades, special operations brigades, combat support brigades, and sustainment brigades.

The maneuver combat components of the group armies are combined arms brigades (Chinese: 合成旅; pinyin: Héchénglǚ), including a mix of heavy combined arms brigades, medium combined arms brigades, light combined arms brigade, amphibious combined arms brigades, and mountain combined arms brigades. The practice is functionally similar to the US Army brigade combat team concept with unique modifications influenced by China's terrain diversity, strategic priority, political system, and military history.

The PLA heavy, medium, and light combined arms brigades share a modular construct, resembling its superior and subordinate units at the corps and battalion level. A typical PLAGF combined arms brigade has the brigade HQ, four maneuver combat battalions, and other support battalions. For instance, a heavy combined arms brigade includes four combined arms battalions (Chinese: 合成营; pinyin: Héchéngyíng), one artillery battalion, one air defense battalion, one reconnaissance battalion, one combat support battalion, and one sustainment battalion.

Combined arms battalions apply a structure drawn from the brigade echelon. For example, heavy combined arms battalions consist of battalions HQ company (including subordinate medic, reconnaissance, and air defense platoons), four maneuver combat companies including two tank companies (14 tanks per company), and two mechanized infantry companies (14 vehicles per company), one firepower company, and one combat support/sustainment company.

Before the 2015 reform, the International Institute for Strategic Studies (IISS) attributes the PLA Ground Force with nine active armored divisions consisting of a number of armored brigades, 25 infantry divisions (mechanized or motorized), organized into a number of infantry brigades, and 8 artillery divisions, also organized into field artillery brigades. Dennis Blasko wrote in 2000 that the traditional structure of PLA divisions (armored and mechanized) consisted roughly of three regiments or brigades – tuan (Chinese: 团; pinyin: Tuán) – of the main service arm, each of three battalions (Chinese: 营; pinyin: yíng) plus support units, a fourth regiment/brigade of infantry (in an armored division) or armor (in an infantry division), a field artillery regiment, an anti-aircraft defense regiment or battalion, and signals, engineer, reconnaissance, and chemical defense battalions or companies, plus combat service support units.

=== Special operations forces ===
The PLA first became interested in modern special warfare in the mid-1980s when it was shifting from the "People's War" to "active defense." After the reform, PLA special operations forces are organized under the combined corps level, as special operations brigades (Chinese: 特战旅; pinyin: Tèzhànlǚ). Special operation brigades provide organic deep reconnaissance and commando operation capability to the combined arms maneuver operations of their respective group armies, and they are highly specialized to operate in their specific theater. Different from Western-style special operations forces, PLAGF special operations brigades focus on operating in conventional military environments with missions focusing on Special Reconnaissance, target acquisition, Direct Action, sabotage, raids, and search and rescue. The unconventional warfare, counterterrorism, foreign internal defense, civil affairs, and internal security capability in China are covered by People's Armed Police (PAP) special operations units, instead of the military.

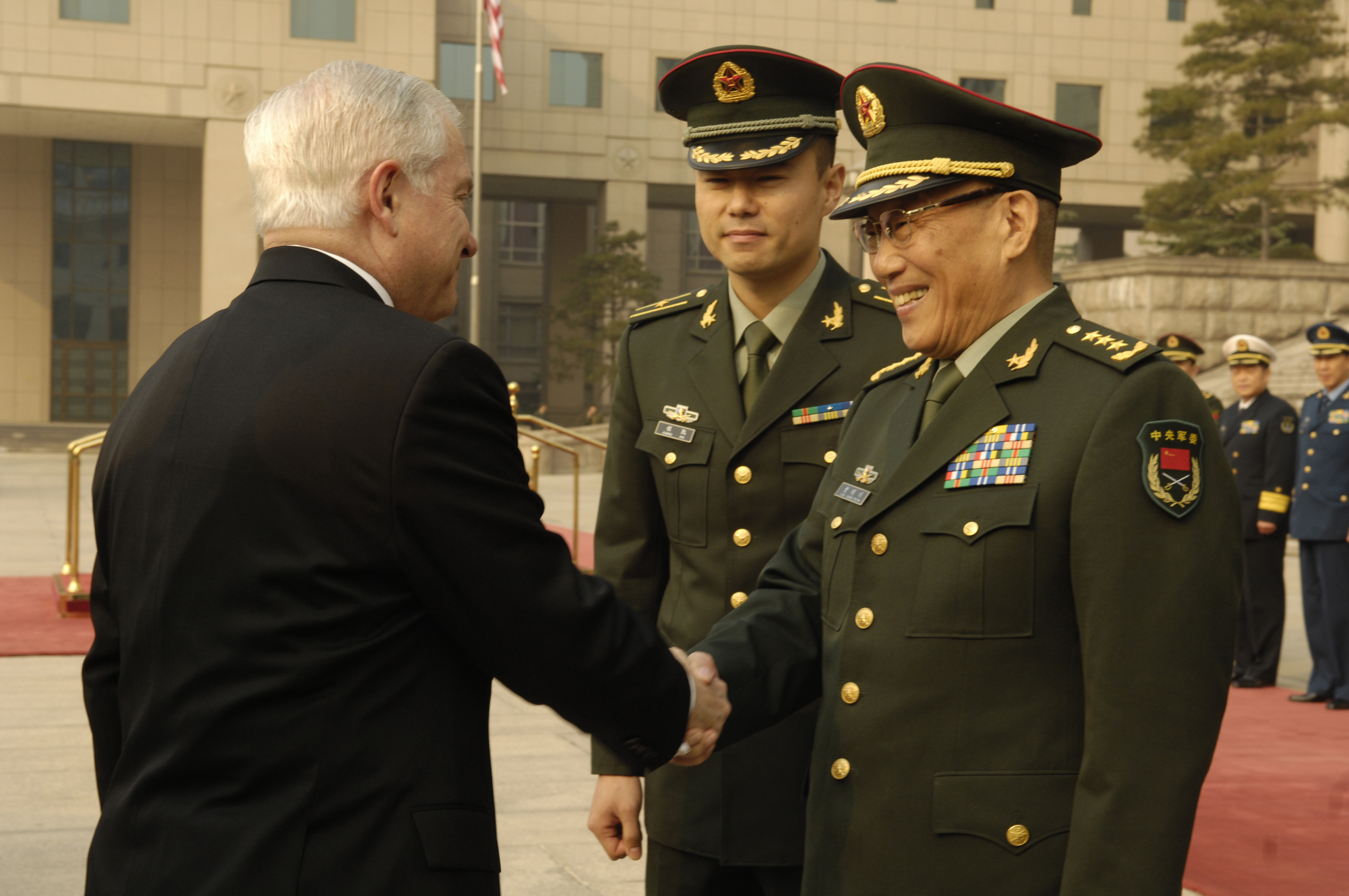
U.S. Defense Secretary Robert Gates greets Chinese Defense Minister Cao Gangchuan in Beijing, China on 5 November 2007

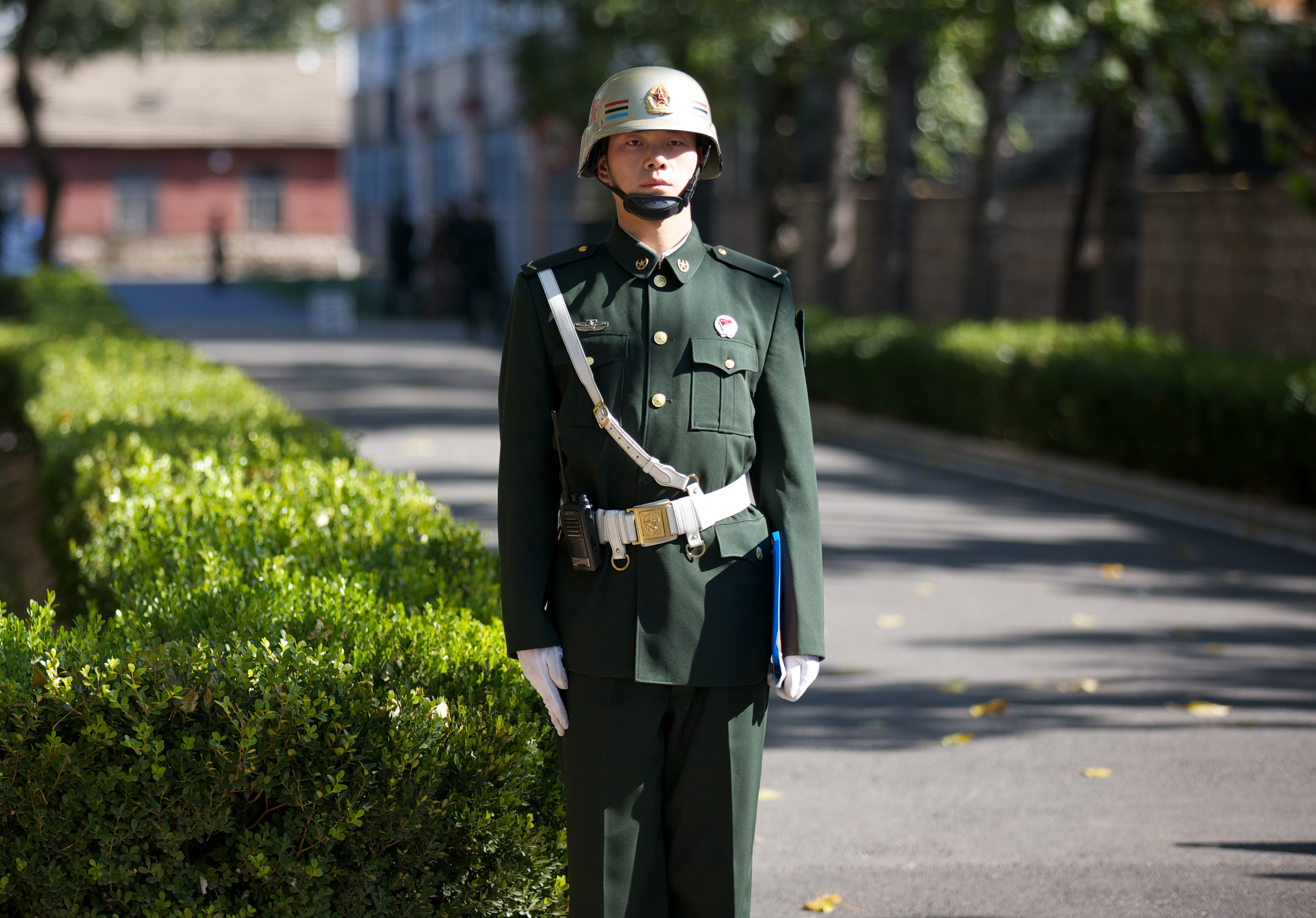
Military guard of the PLAGF in 2012

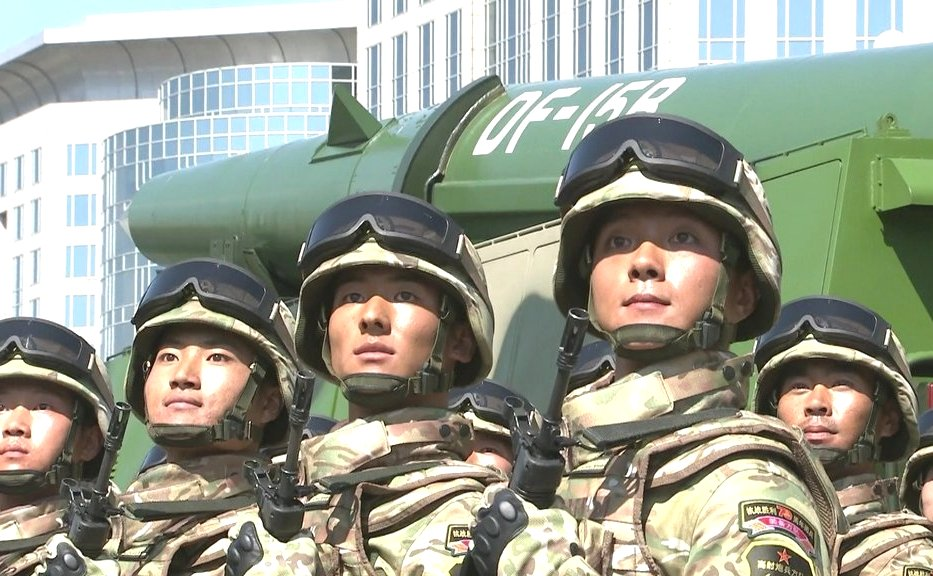
PLAGF infantrymen at the 2015 China Victory Day Parade

== Personnel ==
=== Commissioned officers ===
The current system of officer ranks and insignia was established in 1988. There are several paths to becoming a commissioned officer, such as joining a military academy, attending a reserve officer program, or a cadre selection program.

Officers may use Comrade to formally address another member of the military ("comrade" plus rank or position, as in "comrade Colonel", "comrade battalion leader", or simply "comrade(s)" when lacking information about the person's rank, or talking to several service people.)

Title	上将 Shang jiang	中将 Zhong jiang	少将 Shao jiang	大校 Da xiao	上校 Shang xiao	中校 Zhong xiao	少校 Shao xiao	上尉 Shang wei	中尉 Zhong wei	少尉 Shao wei	学员 Xue yuan
Equivalent translation	General	Lieutenant general	Major general	Senior colonel	Colonel	Lieutenant colonel	Major	Captain	First lieutenant	Second lieutenant	Officer cadet
Shoulder insignia											
Collar insignia											

=== Enlisted personnel ===
The current system of other ranks and insignia dates from 2022. Sergeant and Corporal are referred to as non-commissioned officers. New recruits have no military ranks before the boot camp is completed, and they will be awarded the rank of private after they have graduated from the induction training. According to Article 16 of Chapter 3 of the "Regulations on the Service of Active Soldiers of the Chinese People's Liberation Army" (Chinese: 中国人民解放军现役士兵服役条例), "The lowest enlisted rank is Private".

Conscripts (Note: The term "conscripts" (Chinese: 义务兵; pinyin: Yìwùbīng; lit. 'obligated soldier') in the PLA refers to all enlisted military personnel regardless of their status as recruited, conscripted, or voluntarily joined. Those who volunteered to join the force are still called "[being] conscripted" by the PLA. All enlisted personnel, for the first two years of their service, are designated "conscripts" within the PLA. When the "conscripts" become NCOs, they are sometimes called "volunteers".) can be promoted to private first class in their second year. At the end of two years, conscripts may retire or become NCOs if they volunteer, though the position requires at least a high school diploma, specialized skills, or undertaking training courses. They can also attend a military academy to become officers after evaluations.

In 2014, the position of unit "master chief" or "sergeant major" was established to award experienced NCOs who can assist platoon, company, battalion, and higher commands in leadership and training responsibilities.

Soldiers may use Comrade to formally address another member of the military ("comrade" plus rank or position, as in "comrade Sergeant", "comrade squad leader", or simply "comrade(s)" when lacking information about the person's rank, or talking to several service people.)

Rank group	高级军士 Gāo jí jūn shì			中级军士 Zhōng jí jūn shì		初级军士 Chū jí jūn shì		义务兵 Yì wù bīng	
Title	一级军士长 Yī jí jūn shì zhǎng	二级军士长 Er jí jūn shì zhǎng	三级军士长 Sān jí jūn shì zhǎng	一级上士 Yī jí shàng shì	二级上士 Er jí shàng shì	中士 Zhōng shì	下士 Xià shì	上等兵 Shàng děng bīng	列兵 Liè bīng
Equivalent translation	Master Sergeant First Class	Master Sergeant Second Class	Master Sergeant Third Class	Staff Sergeant First Class	Staff Sergeant Second Class	Sergeant	Corporal	Private First Class	Private
Shoulder insignia									
Collar insignia									

== Equipment ==
=== Heavy equipment ===
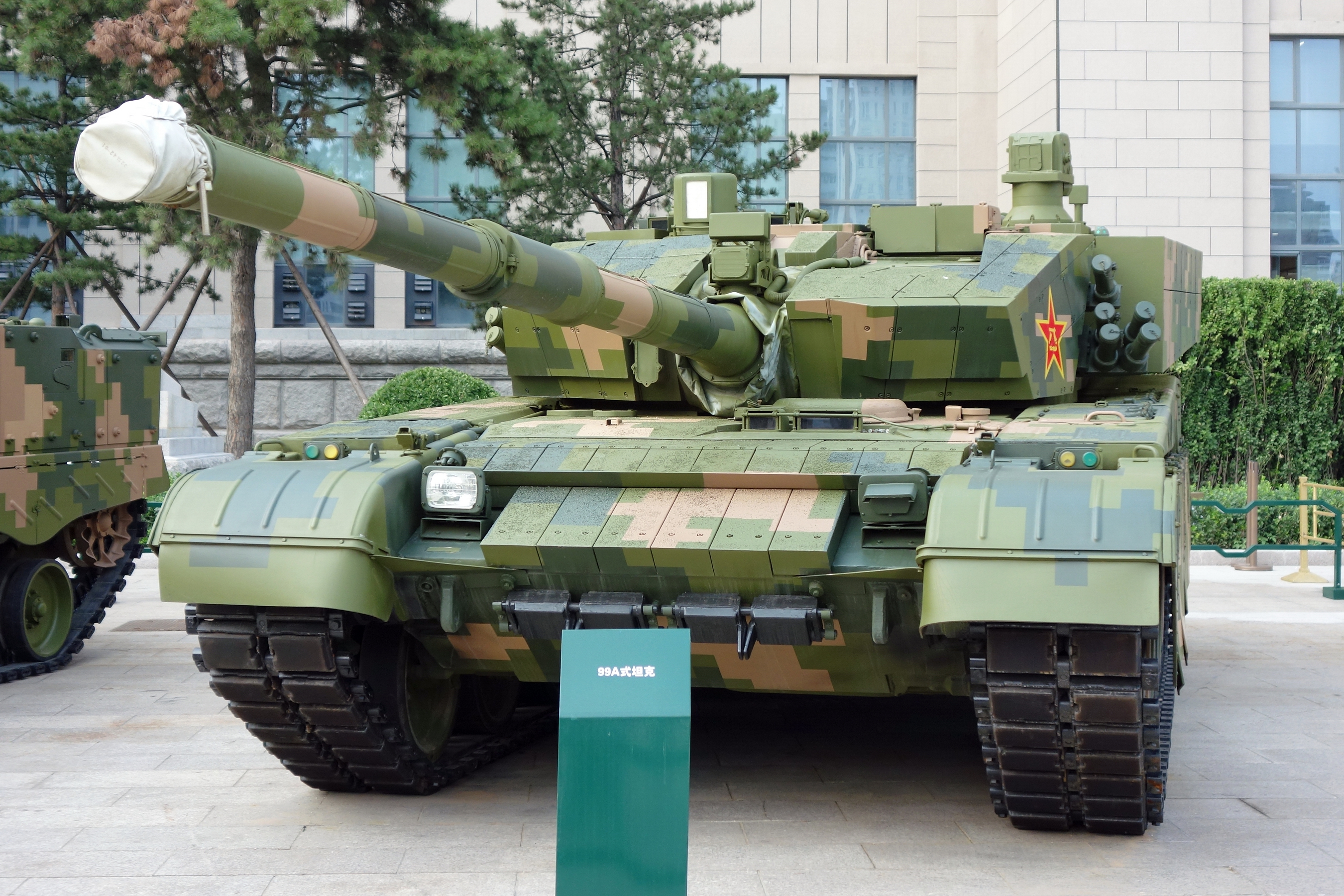
Type 99A main battle tank

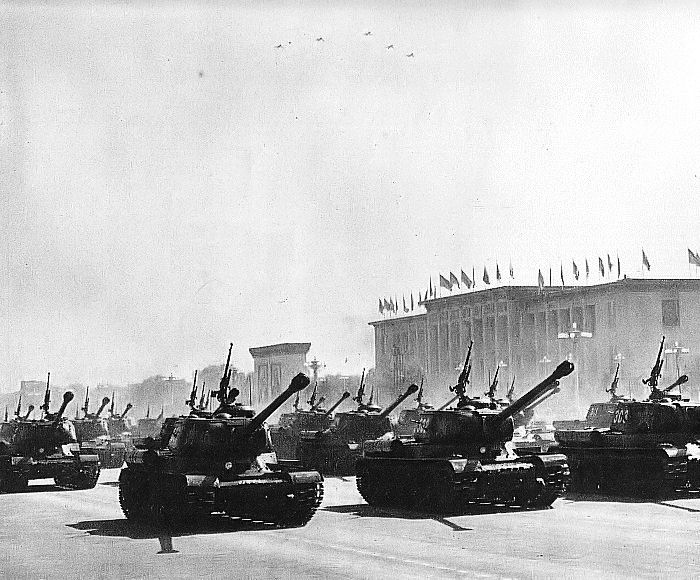
IS-2 tanks on display at the 10th anniversary of the founding of the PRC in 1959

The PLA Ground Force is heavily mechanized with armored platforms, advanced electronic warfare capability, concentrated firepower, and modern weapon systems that are competitive against Western counterparts. The PLA ground force is divided into highly mechanized heavy, medium, and light combined arms units. Heavy combined arms brigades are armored with main battle tanks and tracked infantry fighting vehicles, medium combined arms brigades are armed with tracked or wheeled infantry fighting vehicles, and light combined arms brigades are mobilized with armored personnel carriers, MRAP trucks, or armored cars.

At combined corps level, the PLAGF employs combined arms brigades, heavy artillery systems, medium-range air defense systems, special forces, army aviation units, and various engineering, and electronic warfare support systems. Weapon systems at this level include PLZ-05 howitzer, PCL-181 howitzer, PHL-03/16 multiple rocket launcher, and HQ-16 air defense system. Air assets within the aviation brigade include Z-10 attack helicopter, Z-19 recon helicopter, and Z-20 utility helicopter, etc. Unmanned aerial systems are employed extensively in PLA formations of all types.

At combined arms brigade level, brigade HQ can deploy various combined arms battalions composited with tanks, assault guns, and infantry fight vehicles (IFV) such as the ZTZ-99A tank, the ZBD-04A IFV, the ZBL-08 IFV, the ZTL-11 assault gun, and the CSK-181 MRAP fast-attack vehicle. Fire support, reconnaissance, and air defense battalion are equipped with PLZ-07, PLL-09, PCL-161/171 self-propelled artilleries, PHL-11, PHZ-11 multiple rocket launchers, AFT-9/10 missile carriers, PGZ-09/95, PGL-12/625, HQ-17/A air defense systems, and such as large amount of unmanned aerial vehicles.

At battalion level, battalion HQ can direct tank company, assault gun company, mechanized infantry company, and firepower company (Chinese: 火力连; pinyin: Huǒlìlián) to provide rapid close-combat maneuver, with support assets including the PCP-001 rapid-firing mortar, PLL-05/PLZ-10 self-propelled gun-mortars, AFT-8 missile carrier, MANPADS, and crew-served weapon systems such as QJG-85 heavy machine gun, PP-87 or newer PBP-172 mortar, QLZ-04 automatic grenade launcher, and HJ-8E wire-guided missile.

Under each mechanized infantry company are standard infantry platoons and a firepower platoon (Chinese: 火力排; pinyin: Huǒlìpái), which is equipped with lightweight mortar, anti-material rifle, 35 mm automatic grenade launcher, various rocket launcher, and heavy machine gun. At platoon level, a mechanized infantry squad consists of nine infantrymen, in which seven members are dismounted during combat. Infantry squads vary in composition based on the type of combined arms battalions. Medium and light infantry squads equip reusable rocket launchers to improve anti-armor and anti-fortification capability, whereas heavy infantry squads have no squad-level rockets, instead relying upon fire support from the firepower platoon, or their own ZBD-04A infantry fighting vehicle.

=== Weapons ===
==== Individual and crew-served weapons ====
The standard-issue rifle of PLA infantrymen is QBZ-95/191 chambered in proprietary 5.8×42mm, and the sidearm is QSZ-92 chambered in 5.8×21mm DAP92. Vehicle crews are equipped with QBZ-95B short-barreled carbine. The QCW-05 is a 5.8 mm submachine gun used by special forces and non-combat personnel. Sharpshooting is provided by the QBU-88/191 marksman rifle and QBU-141/202 sniper rifle. Indirect fire is provided by the QLG-10 grenade launcher. QBS-09 combat shotgun is issued for door breaching and close-quarters battle. The QJB-95 serves as the squad automatic weapon with its 75-round drum magazine.

PF-89, PF-97, and DZJ-08 disposable rocket launchers could be distributed on an ad hoc basis to infantry squads for direct-fire applications. Specialized fire support weapons, often equipped with dedicated rocketeers, or members of the firepower platoons, include the HJ-12 anti-tank guided missile, PF-98 rocket launcher, the QLZ-87 and QLZ-04 35 mm automatic grenade launcher, the QBU-10 anti-material rifle, QLU-11 sniper grenade launcher, QJG-02 anti-air machine gun, QJZ-89 heavy machine gun, and the PP-89/93 60 mm mortar.

==== Infantry equipment and uniforms ====
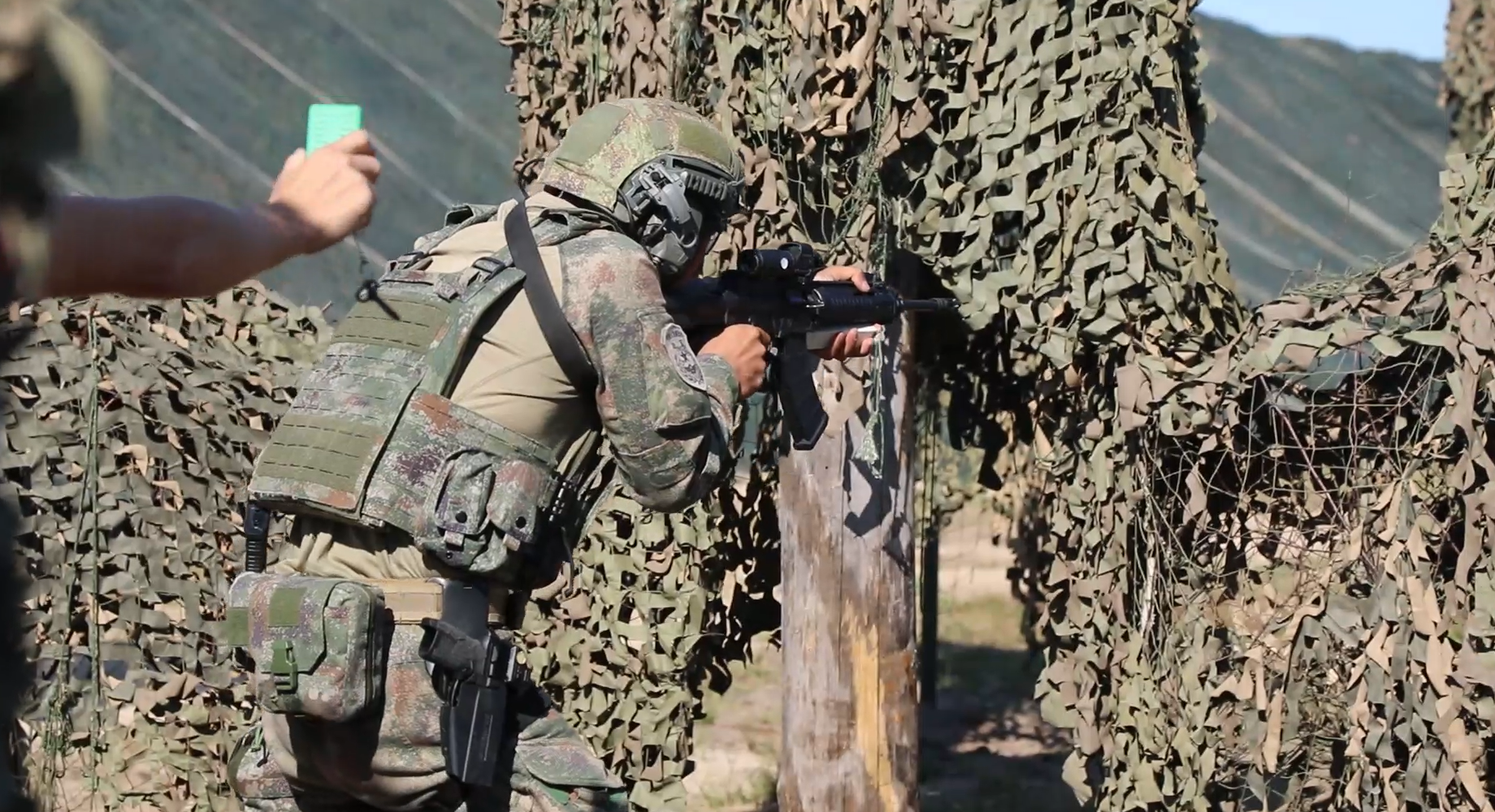
A PLAGF soldier armed with a QBZ-191 assault rifle and QSZ-92A pistol with Type-19 uniform in the 2021 International Army Games

In 2014, the cost to equip a single Chinese soldier is about 9,400 yuan (US$1,523). The standard kit includes Type 07 camouflage uniforms, helmet, tactical vest, gas mask, backpack, first-aid kit, infantry weapons, woven belt, rain cap, camouflaged uniform, kettle, and combat boots. However, regular infantrymen rarely use the issued body armor stored in the armory. Prior to 2015, only deployed special operation detachments were equipped with body armor.

The infantry equipment such as heavy body armor, personal radio, and knee pads has been seen in the standard kit in 2015 when PLA are deployed into high-risk areas, as observed for units participating in UN Peacekeeping and counter-piracy operations. The PLA has started to procure body armors for soldiers on large scale since March 2020, with 1.4 million body armor on order, which includes 930,000 units of plates for universal bulletproof vests and 467,000 units of plates for an enhanced bulletproof vest.

The Type 19 uniform with new xingkong digital camouflage patterns, tactical vest, backpack, protective gear, and eyewear started to replace Type 07 uniform series since 2019. Along with the uniform, a new communication system, personal computer, tactical interface, and assault rifle family QBZ-191, new variants of the QSZ-92 pistol family, along with whole new sets of weapon systems are also being adopted by the PLAGF since 2019. These new upgrades are components of the new Integrated Soldier Combat System, a program aiming to overhaul the PLA's infantry equipment.

=== Transformation ===
In 1987, the PLAGF, which relied upon obsolescent but serviceable equipment, were most anxious to improve defenses against armored vehicles and aircraft. Most equipments was produced from Soviet designs of the 1950s, but weapons were being incrementally upgraded, some with Western technology. One example of upgraded, Soviet-design equipment was the Type 69 MBT, an improved version of the Type 59 MBT, itself based on the Soviet T-54. The Type 69 had improved armor, a gun stabilizer, a fire control system including a laser rangefinder, infrared searchlights, and a 105 mm smooth-bore gun.

In 1987, the existence of a new, Type 80 MBT was revealed in the Western press. The tank had a new chassis, a 105 mm gun, and a fire control system.

The PLA had a scarcity of antitank guided missiles, tactical surface-to-air missiles, and electronics to improve communications, fire control, and sensors. China began production of the Soviet Sagger antitank missile in 1979 but lacked a more powerful, longer range, semiautomatic antitank guided missile. The PLA required a mobile surface-to-air missile and an infantry shoulder-fired missile for use against helicopters and certain other aircraft.

The PLAGF continues to undergo significant modernization and re-structuring to deal with potential threats and enhance their capabilities. Front line troops such as special forces, marines and paratroopers are given priority in receiving modern weapon systems and equipment. Other areas of improvement are its battlefield C4ISR capabilities, with the introduction of satellite communications, wireless networks, and digital radios, army commanders are now able to maintain constant communications with their front-line units while on the move. The bulk of the ground forces have been regularly asked to operate under severe electronic countermeasures conditions in exercises. Also a network-centric warfare capability connecting different combat, intelligence, surveillance and reconnaissance elements to form an integrated network is being developed.

=== Equipment summary ===
The PLAGF inventory maintains an array of military vehicles. All figures below are provided by the International Institute for Strategic Studies. Auxiliary vehicles such as engineering vehicles, logistics vehicles, reconnaissance vehicles, as well as antiquated and reserved equipment are not included.

Type	Active
Main battle tanks	4,700
Light tanks	1,250
Assault guns	1,200
Infantry fighting vehicles	8,060
Armored personnel carriers	3,600
Amphibious armored vehicles	750
Anti-tank missile carriers	1,125
Tank destroyers	480
Towed anti-tank guns	1,308
Self-propelled artillery	3,240<
Towed artillery	900
Self-propelled gun-mortars	1,250
Multiple rocket launchers	1,390+
Surface-to-air missile systems	754+
Self-propelled anti-aircraft guns	270
Towed anti-aircraft guns	7,126+
Attack helicopters	320+
Multi-role helicopters	208
Transport helicopters	512

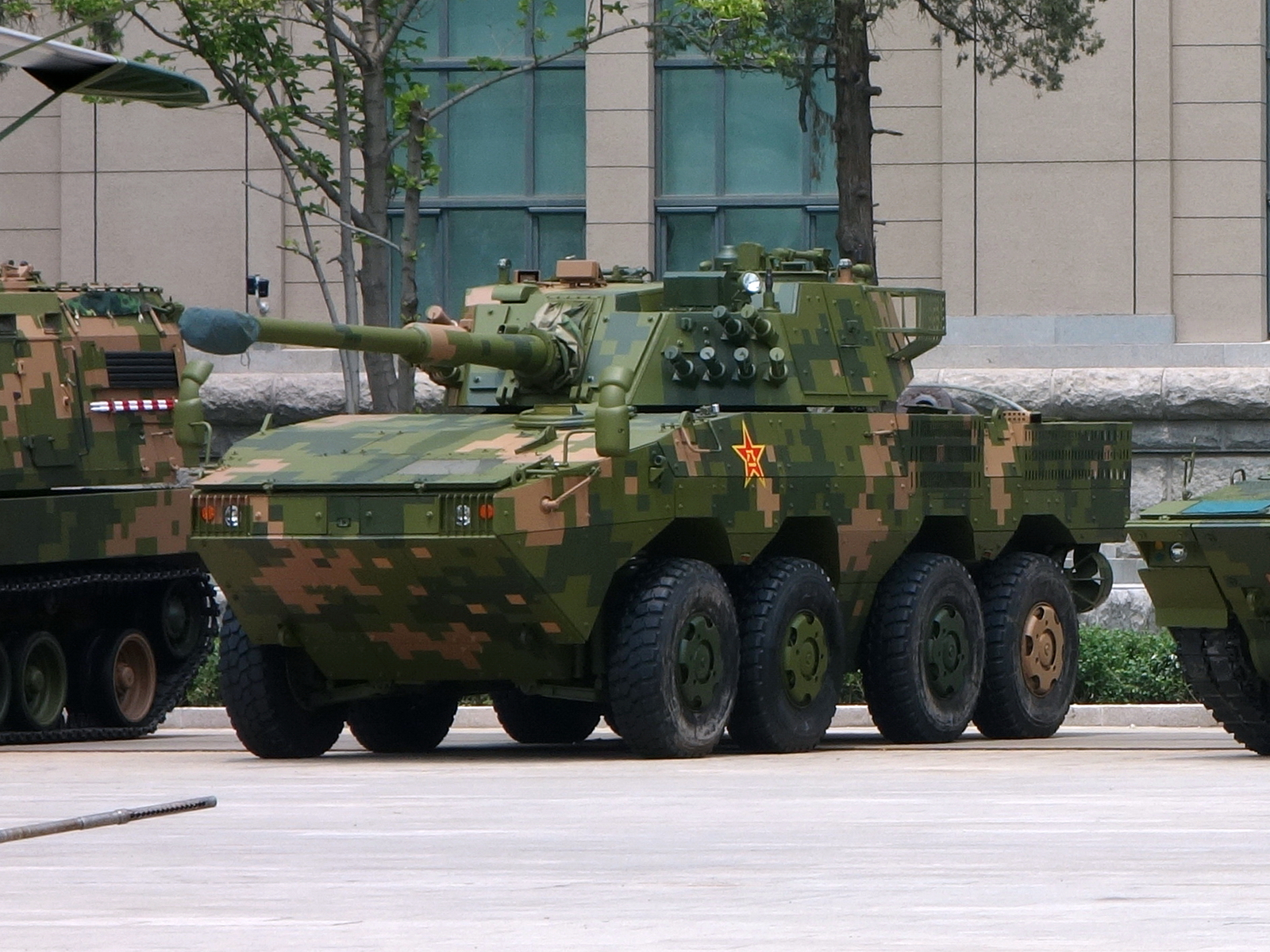
ZLT-11 assault vehicle

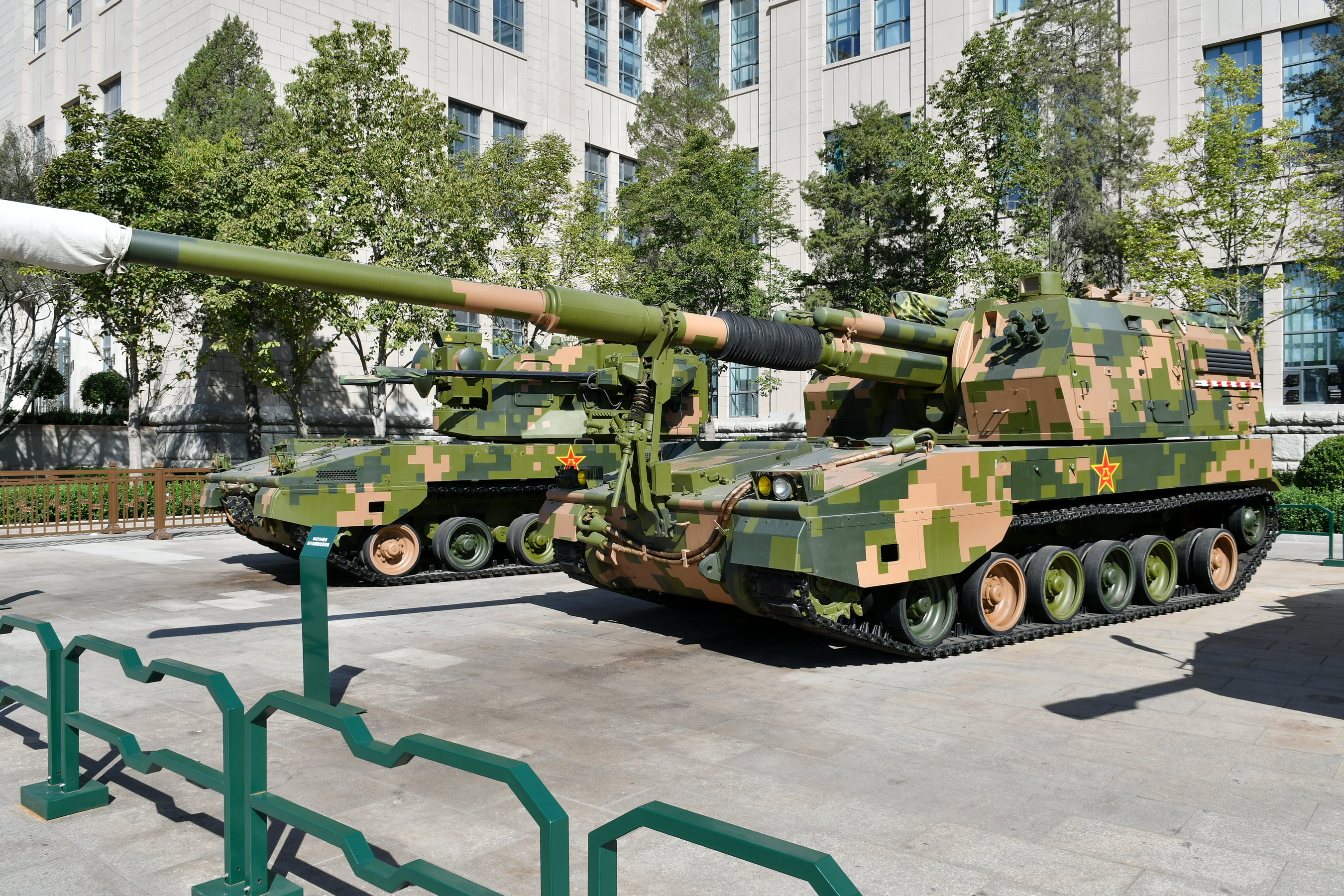
PLZ-05 self-propelled howitzer

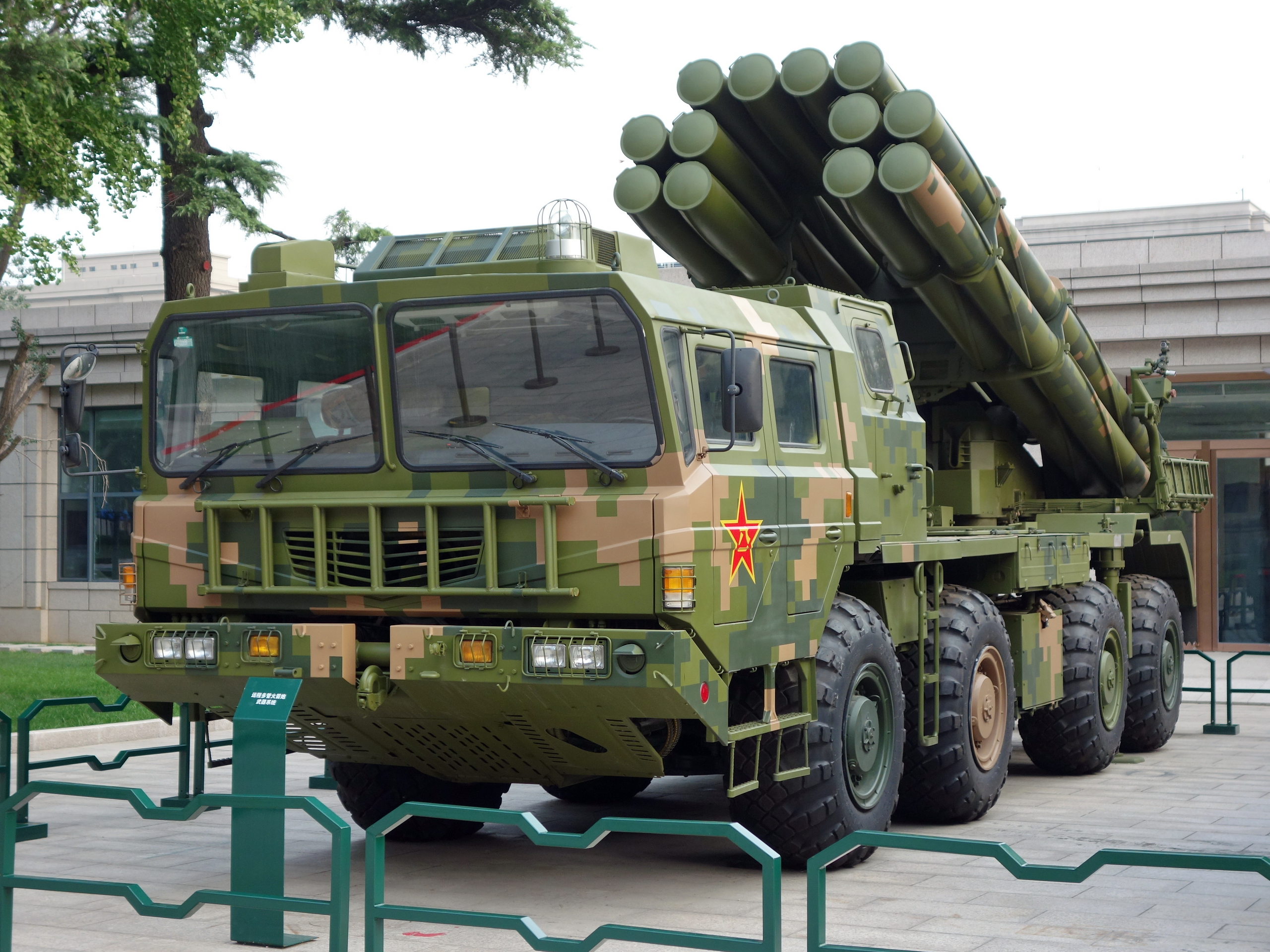
PHL-03 multiple rocket launcher

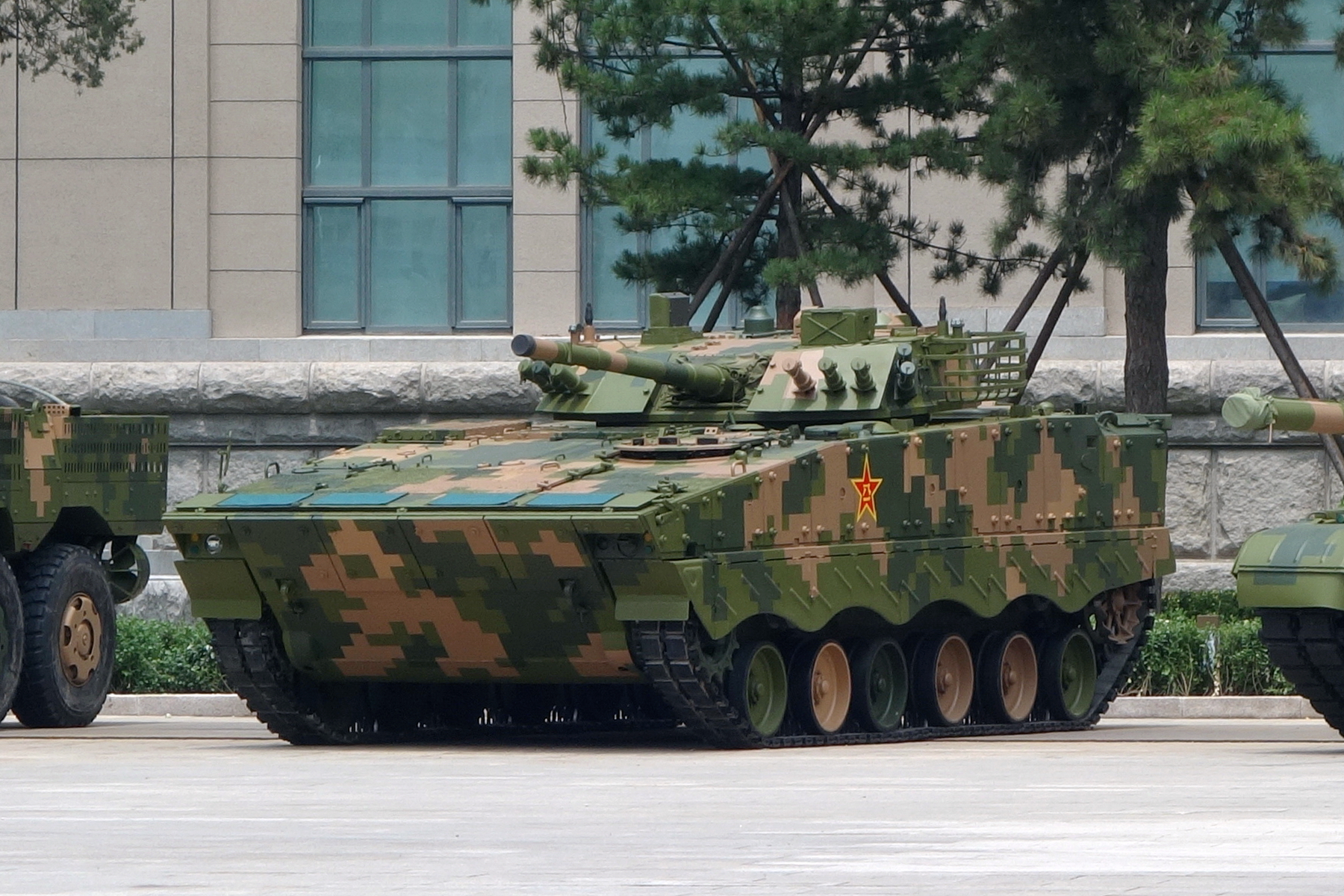
ZBD-04A infantry fighting vehicle

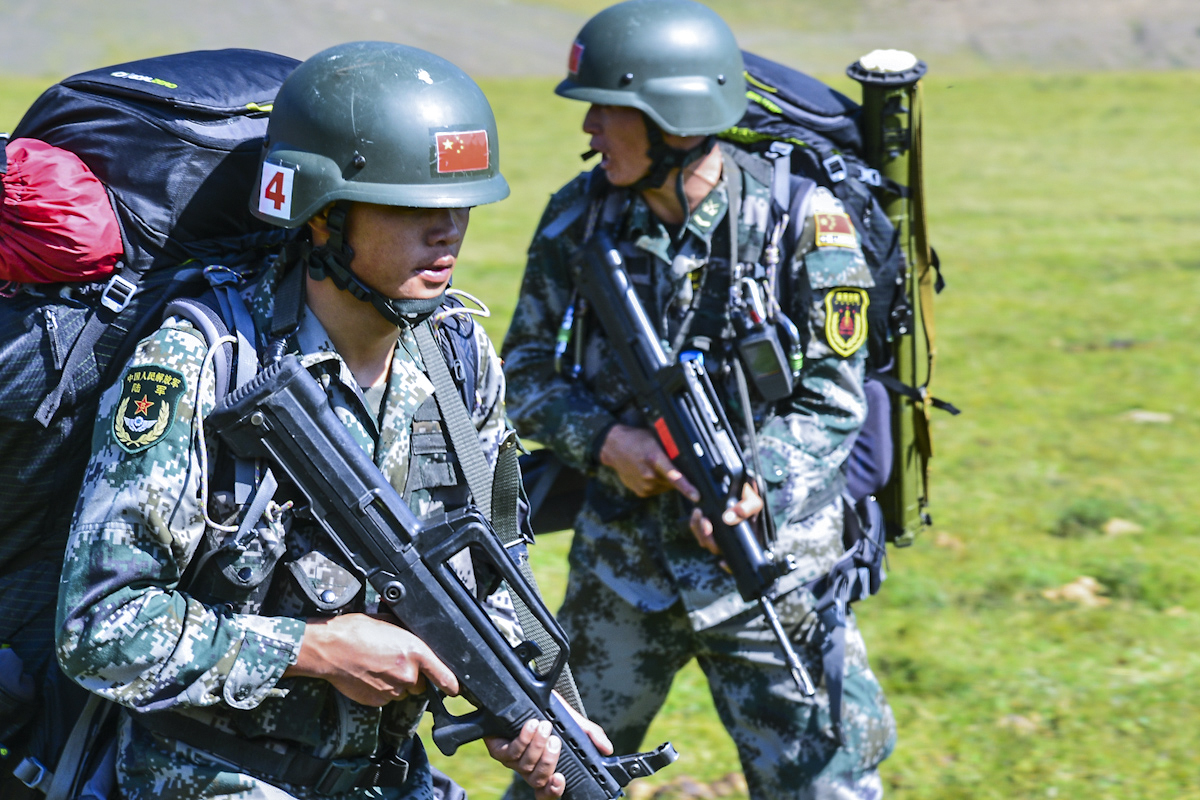
Infantrymen with QBZ-95

== Relationship with other organizations ==
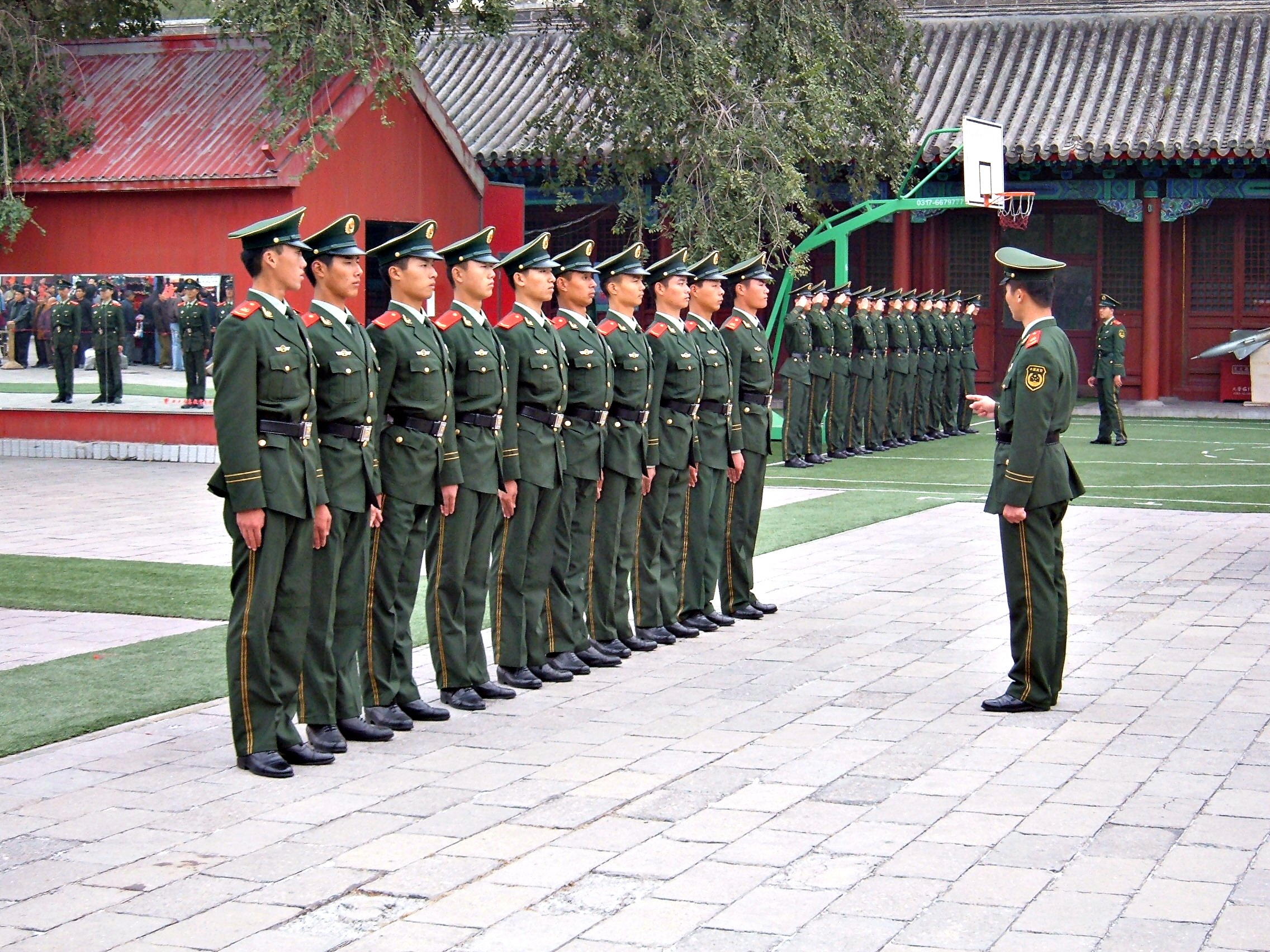
Troops of the People's Armed Police

The People's Liberation Army Ground Force maintains close relationships with several paramilitary organizations within China, primarily the People's Armed Police (PAP) and the Militia (also known as the China Militia). Both of these paramilitary organizations act as a reserve force for the PLAGF during a time of national emergency such as war or natural disaster. The PAP consists of approximately 1.5 million personnel. Their primary mission during peacetime is internal security and counter-terrorism.

The Militia is a paramilitary force engaged under the control of the Chinese Communist Party (CCP), and forms part of the Chinese armed forces. Under the command of the military organs, it undertakes such jobs as war preparation services, security and defense operation tasks and assistance in maintaining social order and public security. The Militia numbers some 3 million service men and women.

== See also ==
- Outline of the military history of the People's Republic of China
- Ranks of the People's Liberation Army Ground Force
- People's Armed Police
- Militia (China)
- Republic of China (Taiwan) Army
