= Type 87 (camouflage) =

Chinese camouflage scheme

- People's Liberation Army Type 87 woodland pattern
- Type: Military camouflage pattern
- Place of origin: China

Service history
- In service: 1987–2007
- Used by: People's Liberation Army

Production history
- Produced: 1987–2000s

The Type 87 is a camouflage pattern formerly used by People's Liberation Army of the People's Republic of China. The pattern is the first standardized pattern for temperate climate.

== Design ==
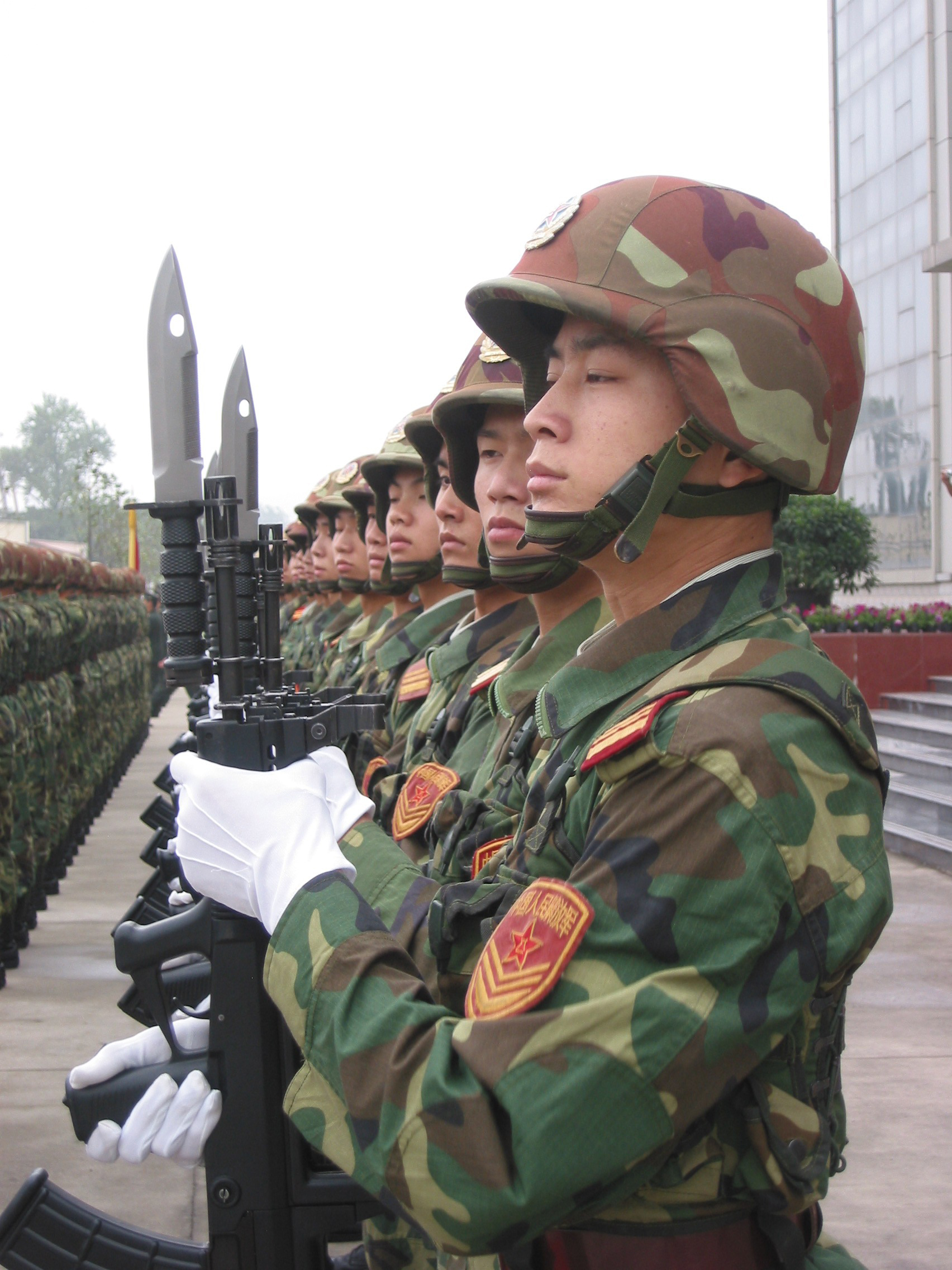
Honor guard of the PLAGF at their base in Nanjing, 2009.

The Type 87's style imitates that of the older American U.S. Woodland camouflage, in the sense it utilizes a macropattern of four colours for concealment, printed in interlocking, elongated and branching blobs. Type 87 uses a yellowish-green colour for its fourth colour, as opposed to the US pattern's khaki. Type 87 is the camouflage pattern for Type 87 Combat & Training Uniform. The camouflage and uniform is replaced by the digital Type 07 Combat & Training Uniform.

=== Pattern ===
The main variant is a four-colour woodland pattern with olive, green, yellowish-green and black. Type 87, like many other woodland uniforms with black, has been criticized for its use of this color, but once faded, it becomes dull and subdued, and therefore virtually unnoticeable.

The Type 87 has developed many variants throughout its service, each with different designations and colour variants. For example, there are Type 87, Type 95, and Type 03 patterns.
