= Ribbon bars of the armed forces of China =

Military insignia of China

The military ribbon bars of the armed forces of the People's Republic of China (Chinese: 中华人民共和国军人勋表; pinyin: Zhōnghuá Rénmín Gònghéguó jūnrén xūnbiǎo) are a set of around 200 ribbon bars ([勋表], sometimes called badges [略章]) used by the People's Liberation Army and the People's Armed Police to mark a number of awards, accomplishments, positions, and time in service on their uniforms. The current standard was issued in January 2023, and it's called the "Type 23" ribbon system, intended to be used as formal components of the "Type 19/21" uniforms. The Type 23 system supersedes the Type 07 system, that only had 22 ribbons.

The Type 23 ribbon system includes four categories of ribbon bars: 97 military honors ribbons, 63 service experience ribbons, 24 position grade ribbons, and 14 ribbons to show years of service. The system is somewhat broader in use than most Western ribbon bar systems, as while some ribbons do correspond to specific awards and medals, many are indicators of posts and occupations, closer in use to the service stripes, tabs, and badges used in the US and other Western militaries.

== Structure of the Type 23 system ==
On 28 January 2023, Xi Jinping, chairman of the Central Military Commission, signed an order to issue the "Regulations on the Administration of Military Medals" (军人勋表管理规定), which were implemented retroactively from 1 January 2023. The ribbon bars are meant to emphasize the highlights of every career, showing not just the seniority but the career development paths and accomplishments of every officer and soldier, using a system of 39 sets (项目) of ribbons, each set fitting in one of the four overall categories (类).

=== Granted to ===
Military ribbons may be awarded to active officers, NCOs, conscripts (enlisted), and cadets of military academies, but not to civilian cadres, reserve personnel, or retired veterans.

=== When to wear ===
Officers and servicemen should wear the ribbons when wearing formal uniforms (礼服), daily uniforms (常服), and work uniforms (作业服). They should not wear the ribbons when wearing other military uniforms (i.e. combat/operations/training and athletic), or with casual clothes.

NCOs, enlisted, and cadets may not wear national defense service experience ribbons. Enlisted may not wear military service time ribbons. When wearing the ribbon bars, the corresponding merit medals, award medals, and commemorative medals may be worn at the same time.

=== Where to wear ===
The position of the ribbon rack is determined according to the military uniform. The bars are worn in the center above the left breast pocket cover, with the bottom edge flush with the upper edge of the pocket cover; if there is no jacket pocket, the center line of the ribbons is located on the extension line of the left breast dart line, and the bottom edge is flush with the bottom horizontal line of the name tag worn on the right chest (or the chest badge [胸标] if there is no name tag).

=== Order of Wearing ===
According to guidelines issued by Ministry of Defense in April 2023, the four types of ribbon are typically arranged from top to bottom and from left to right in the order of: position grade, military honors, service experience, and service years. Ribbon bars are organized into rows on an officer's ribbon rack, with each row holding up to three ribbons, and no more than seven rows allowed in total. If the wearer is entitled to more than 21 ribbon bars, priority is given to job grade and honors ribbons.

Position grade ribbons are placed in the center of the first row of ribbons, which may hold either one, two or three ribbons. Rules for honors ribbons include placing personal honors first, followed by collective honors (unit awards); wartime honors first, followed by peacetime honors; military-wide awards first, followed by service branch or People's Armed Police ribbons; medal ribbons in the same category go orders (勋章), awards (奖章) and commemorative medals (纪念章). Within a set, top-class awards go first and lower classes second. Military service experience ribbons are arranged in the order of the 14 items specified in Article 8 of the Regulations. A “digital accessory” (数字配件), meaning a small Arabic numeral pin attached to the face of the ribbon (similar to British and American devices), is used to mark multiple awards of the same type awarded in the same "situational context".

Years-of-service ribbons are worn additively in pairs (so, twelve years of service mean one 10-years ribbon plus one 2-year ribbon), with the larger number on the left.

== List of ribbons of the Type 23 system ==
=== Meritorious service honors ribbon bars (功勋荣誉表彰) ===
Type	Name	Example	Comments	Times awarded
Order of the Red Banner			Currently reserved for wartime, the highest decorations awarded to personnel of the PLA, PAP, Reserves and Militia	2023－
Order of the Red Star			Currently reserved for wartime, the highest decorations awarded to personnel of the PLA, PAP, Reserves and Militia	2023－
Wartime honorary titles, and model unit honors	Special class combat hero			2023－
Wartime honorary titles, and model unit honors	First class combat hero			2023－
Wartime honorary titles, and model unit honors	Second class combat hero			2023－
Wartime honorary titles, and model unit honors	Special class heroic exemplar unit			2023－
Wartime honorary titles, and model unit honors	First class heroic exemplar unit			2023－
Wartime honorary titles, and model unit honors	Second class heroic exemplar unit			2023－
Peacetime merit awards Collective merit honors	Individual First Class			2023－
Peacetime merit awards Collective merit honors	Individual second class			2023－
Peacetime merit awards Collective merit honors	Collective			2023－
Honorary titles for major military operations other than war Collective merit titles	Individual			2023－
Honorary titles for major military operations other than war Collective merit titles	Collective			2023－
Wartime merit awards Collective merit honors	Individual First Class		The flag marks award for commanding operations, a red start marks award for participating in combat, and a red bastion around a silver star marks award for support actions. The silver star marks a general award.	2023－
Wartime merit awards Collective merit honors	Individual Second Class		The flag marks award for commanding operations, a red start marks award for participating in combat, and a red bastion around a silver star marks award for support actions. The silver star marks a general award.	2023－
Wartime merit awards Collective merit honors	Individual Third Class		The flag marks award for commanding operations, a red start marks award for participating in combat, and a red bastion around a silver star marks award for support actions. The silver star marks a general award.	2023－
Wartime merit awards Collective merit honors	Individual Fourth Class		The flag marks award for commanding operations, a red start marks award for participating in combat, and a red bastion around a silver star marks award for support actions. The silver star marks a general award.	2023－
Wartime merit awards Collective merit honors	Collective First Class			2023－
Wartime merit awards Collective merit honors	Collective Second Class			2023－
Wartime merit awards Collective merit honors	Collective Third Class			2023－
Wartime merit awards Collective merit honors	Collective Fourth Class			2023－
Peacetime merit awards Collective merit honors (may be granted 2-20 times)	Individual First Class		A shield with guns in saltire marks merit in combat readiness training; a book marks merit in education management, an atom marks merit in national defense science and technology, and a bastion marks merit in service support. A blank ribbon does not differentiate between situations.	2023－
Peacetime merit awards Collective merit honors (may be granted 2-20 times)	Individual Second Class		A shield with guns in saltire marks merit in combat readiness training; a book marks merit in education management, an atom marks merit in national defense science and technology, and a bastion marks merit in service support. A blank ribbon does not differentiate between situations.	2023－
Peacetime merit awards Collective merit honors (may be granted 2-20 times)	Individual Third Class		A shield with guns in saltire marks merit in combat readiness training; a book marks merit in education management, an atom marks merit in national defense science and technology, and a bastion marks merit in service support. A blank ribbon does not differentiate between situations.	2023－
Peacetime merit awards Collective merit honors (may be granted 2-20 times)	Collective First Class			2023－
Peacetime merit awards Collective merit honors (may be granted 2-20 times)	Collective Second Class			2023－
Peacetime merit awards Collective merit honors (may be granted 2-20 times)	Collective Third Class			2023－
Major MOOTW meritorious service awards Collective merit honors (may be granted 2-20 times)	Individual			2023－
Major MOOTW meritorious service awards Collective merit honors (may be granted 2-20 times)	Collective			2023－
Peacetime citations Collective honor citations (May be added 2-20 times)	Individual		A shield with guns in saltire marks commendable combat readiness training; a book marks commendable education management, an atom marks commendable national defense science and technology, and a bastion marks commendable service support. A blank ribbon does not differentiate between situations.	2023－
Peacetime citations Collective honor citations (May be added 2-20 times)	Collective			2023－
Major MOOTW citations Collective honor citations (may be added 2-20 times)	Individual			2023－
Major MOOTW citations Collective honor citations (may be added 2-20 times)	Collective			2023－
Commendations (may be added 2-20 times)	First Class			2023－
Commendations (may be added 2-20 times)	Second Class			2023－
Commendations (may be added 2-20 times)	Third Class			2023－
Commendations (may be added 2-20 times)	Collective First Class			2023－
Commendations (may be added 2-20 times)	Collective Second Class			2023－
Commendations (may be added 2-20 times)	Collective Third Class			2023－
Outstanding grassroots officer or soldier (may be added 2-20 times)	First Class		For junior officers or enlisted	2023－
Outstanding grassroots officer or soldier (may be added 2-20 times)	Second Class		For junior officers or enlisted	2023－
Outstanding grassroots officer or soldier (may be added 2-20 times)	Third Class		For junior officers or enlisted	2023－
Medal of Valor			For those disabled in combat.	2023－
Dedication to National Defense Commemorative Medal			For those disabled in the line of duty.	2023－
Army Vanguard Honors	First Class			2023－
Army Vanguard Honors	Second Class			2023－
Army Vanguard Honors	Third Class			2023－
Navy Deep Blue Warrior Honors	First Class			2023－
Navy Deep Blue Warrior Honors	Second Class			2023－
Navy Deep Blue Warrior Honors	Third Class			2023－
Air Force Sky and Space Iron Fist Honor	First Class			2023－
Air Force Sky and Space Iron Fist Honor	Second Class			2023－
Air Force Sky and Space Iron Fist Honor	Third Class			2023－
Rocket Force Sharpening Sword Vanguard honor	First Class			2023－
Rocket Force Sharpening Sword Vanguard honor	Second Class			2023－
Rocket Force Sharpening Sword Vanguard honor	Third Class			2023－
Strategic Support Vanguard Honor	First Class			2023－
Strategic Support Vanguard Honor	Second Class			2023－
Strategic Support Vanguard Honor	Third Class			2023－
Joint Logistics Support Pioneer Honor	First Class			2023－
Joint Logistics Support Pioneer Honor	Second Class			2023－
Joint Logistics Support Pioneer Honor	Third Class			2023－
PAP Loyal Guardian Honor	First Class			2023－
PAP Loyal Guardian Honor	Second Class			2023－
PAP Loyal Guardian Honor	Third Class			2023－

=== Service experience ribbon bars (服役经历) ===
Type	Name	Example	Comments	Period awarded
Combat experience			The name and date of the battle are engraved in the back of the ribbon.	2023－
Experience in major MOOTW (may be added 2-20 times)				2023－
Major special mission experience (may be added 2-20 times)				2023－
Overseas service experience	First Class			2023－
Overseas service experience	Second Class			2023－
Overseas service experience	Third Class			2023－
Border defense service experience	First Class			2023－
Border defense service experience	Second Class			2023－
Border defense service experience	Third Class			2023－
Unit command experience	Theater Command grade			2023－
Unit command experience	Theater Command deputy grade			2023－
Unit command experience	Corps grade			2023－
Unit command experience	Corps deputy grade			2023－
Unit command experience	Division grade			2023－
Unit command experience	Division deputy grade			2023－
Unit command experience	Regiment grade			2023－
Unit command experience	Regiment deputy grade			2023－
Unit command experience	Battalion grade			2023－
Unit command experience	Battalion deputy grade			2023－
Unit command experience	Company grade			2023－
Administrative or functional organ work experience	Central Military Commission		The main leaders of the organs have a silver star to the left. The leaders of bureau-level internal departments have a golden star to the right. The leaders of division-level internal departments have a bronze star to the right.	2023－
Administrative or functional organ work experience	Theater Command grade organizations		The main leaders of the organs have a silver star to the left. The leaders of bureau-level internal departments have a golden star to the right. The leaders of division-level internal departments have a bronze star to the right.	2023－
Administrative or functional organ work experience	Theater Command deputy grade organizations		The main leaders of the organs have a silver star to the left. The leaders of bureau-level internal departments have a golden star to the right. The leaders of division-level internal departments have a bronze star to the right.	2023－
Administrative or functional organ work experience	Corps grade organizations		The main leaders of the organs have a silver star to the left. The leaders of bureau-level internal departments have a golden star to the right. The leaders of division-level internal departments have a bronze star to the right.	2023－
Administrative or functional organ work experience	Division, brigade, and regiment grade organizations		The main leaders of the organs have a silver star to the left. The leaders of bureau-level internal departments have a golden star to the right. The leaders of division-level internal departments have a bronze star to the right.	2023－
Joint post experience	Senior			2023－
Joint post experience	Intermediate			2023－
Joint post experience	Junior			2023－
PLA and PAP service experience	PLA Ground Force			2023－
PLA and PAP service experience	PLA Navy			2023－
PLA and PAP service experience	PLA Air Force			2023－
PLA and PAP service experience	PLA Rocket Force			2023－
PLA and PAP service experience	Strategic Support Force		After the dissolution of the SSF, it is unclear what ribbons the three new arms will use.	2023－
PLA and PAP service experience	Joint Logistics Support Force			2023－
PLA and PAP service experience	People's Armed Police			2023－
National Defense Mobilization Department unit experience				2023－
Military institution educational officer (instructor) experience	Full-time			2023－
Military institution educational officer (instructor) experience	Part-time			2023－
Specialized technical position service experience	Senior			2023－
Specialized technical position service experience	Deputy senior			2023－
Specialized technical position service experience	Intermediate			2023－
Specialized technical position service experience	Junior			2023－
Command education and training experience	Senior			2023－
Command education and training experience	Intermediate			2023－
Command education and training experience	Junior			2023－
Special technical officer training experience	Senior			2023－
Special technical officer training experience	Intermediate			2023－
Special technical officer training experience	Junior			2023－
NCO promotion-related training experience	Senior			2023－
NCO promotion-related training experience	Intermediate			2023－
NCO promotion-related training experience	Junior			2023－
International education and training experience (may be added 2-20 times)				2023－
Source				

=== Position grade ribbon bars (岗位职务层级) ===
Type	Name	Example	Comments	Period awarded
Command officer	CMC Vice-chairman grade			2023－
Command officer	CMC member grade			2023－
Command officer	Theater Command leader grade			2023－
Command officer	Theater Command deputy leader grade			2023－
Command officer	Corps leader grade			2023－
Command officer	Corps deputy leader grade			2023－
Command officer	Division leader grade			2023－
Command officer	Division deputy leader grade			2023－
Command officer	Regiment leader grade			2023－
Command officer	Regiment deputy leader grade			2023－
Command officer	Battalion leader grade			2023－
Command officer	Battalion deputy leader grade			2023－
Command officer	Company leader grade			2023－
Command officer	Deputy company leader grade			2023－
Command officer	Platoon leader grade			2023－
Specialist technical officer	Senior			2023－
Specialist technical officer	Deputy senior			2023－
Specialist technical officer	Intermediate			2023－
Specialist technical officer	Junior			2023－
NCO Administrative Position	Staff sergeant			2023－
NCO Administrative Position	Platoon leader			2023－
NCO Administrative Position	Deputy platoon leader			2023－
NCO Administrative Position	Squad leader			2023－
NCO Administrative Position	Deputy squad leader			2023－

=== Time in service ribbon bars (服役年限) ===
Type	Name	Example	Comments	Period awarded
Time in service ribbon	1 year			2023－
Time in service ribbon	2 years			2023－
Time in service ribbon	3 years			2023－
Time in service ribbon	4 yrs			2023－
Time in service ribbon	5 years			2023－
Time in service ribbon	6 years			2023－
Time in service ribbon	7 years			2023－
Time in service ribbon	8 years			2023－
Time in service ribbon	9 years			2023－
Time in service ribbon	10 years			2023－
Time in service ribbon	20 years			2023－
Time in service ribbon	30 years			2023－
Time in service ribbon	40 years			2023－
Time in service ribbon	50 years			2023－

== Historical ribbons ==
The system of military honors in the People's Liberation Army and the People's Armed Police consists of merit medals (勋章, also called "Order medals"), award medals (奖章, usually called Awards), commemorative medals (纪念章), and a complementary system of honorary titles (荣誉称号), plus citations (嘉奖), commendations (表彰), and certificates (证章).

Even though the early Communist Party was adverse to individual awards as damaging to the collectivist revolutionary spirit, the earliest awards of medals, awards, and commemorative medals can be traced back to the First Civil War between the Kuomintang and the CCP. In the history of the Chinese Communist armed forces, there have been three large-scale awarding events, namely: the August 1st Army Day of 1933, when the Chinese Soviet Republic was founded: the Red Star Medal was awarded to officers and soldiers of the Chinese Workers' and Peasants' Red Army who had made special contributions. In 1955, the People's Republic of China awarded the August 1st Medal (1955 version), the Order of Independence and Freedom Medal and the Order of Liberation Medal to meritorious personnel who had served in the First Civil War between the Kuomintang and the Communist Party, the Agrarian Revolutionary War, the Anti-Japanese War, and the Second Civil War. In 1988, the Medal of Honor (a commemorative medal) was awarded to retired military personnel in three leveles, depending on whether they had joined between 1927 and 1937, 1937–1945, or 1945–1949.

In addition, at various points in time, the Central Military Commission and various military departments had awarded various standard medals and commemorative medals in a relatively ad hoc manner. It was not until 23 March 1979 that the General Political Department of the People's Liberation Army issued the "Notice on the awarding of wartime Heroic Exemplar Medals and meritorious service medals" and then on 20 October of the same year, the "Notice on the awarding of meritorious service medals and Heroic Exemplar Medals to personnel who have made meritorious service and are awarded honorary titles in peacetime" was issued and implemented in December. Only then did the central government unify the standards and rules of military awards.

The revised "Discipline Order" (纪律条令) in 2010 adjusted and integrated the names of some medals, awards and commemorative medals. The Heroic Exemplar Medal was adjusted up to the Order of the Heroic Exemplar, and five new commemorative medals were added, including medals for national defense service, defending the country and guarding the border, dedication to national defense, peace missions, and executing combat and major tasks.

On August 1, 2011, new medals, awards and commemorative medals were issued. The new rules and regulations only exchanged the original Heroic Exemplar Award to the Order of the Heroic Exemplar Medal, and adjusted the overall styles of the medals, awards and commemorative medals. They were designed by the General Political Department and approved by the Central Military Commission.

In 2017, the new August 1 Medal was re-established as the highest honor of the military. In April 2018, a new version of the "Discipline Regulations" was promulgated, exchanging the original Second Class honor titles to First Class, and merging the two levels of Heroic Exemplar Medals into a single Heroic Exemplar Award Medal.

=== Order of August 1st ===
The ribbon separately awarded with the Order of August 1 medal is different to the ribbon used in the standard Type 23 ribbon rack to represent the honor.

Type	Name	Example	Comments	Dates awarded
Order of August 1st			The highest honor available for members of the military.	2017–present

=== Grade ribbons ===
In 2007, active-duty officers and civilian cadres of the People's Republic of China began to wear grade and service time ribbons, to indicate the length of service and grade of the military personnel. This badge system was discontinued in 2023 due to the promulgation of the "Regulations on the Management of Military Ribbon Bars".

Type	Name	Example	Comments	Period awarded
Grade ribbons	Vice-chairman of the CMC		Golden stripe Grade marked with a golden star surrounded by a wreath of olive leaves	2007－ 2023
Grade ribbons	Member of the CMC		Golden stripe Grade marked with a golden star surrounded by a wreath of olive leaves	2007－ 2023
Grade ribbons	Theater Command grade		Yellow-orange stripe Full grade positions with two golden stars, deputy grade positions with one golden star	2007－ 2023
Grade ribbons	Corps grade		Orange stripe Full grade positions with two golden stars, deputy grade positions with one golden star	2007－ 2023
Grade ribbons	Division grade		Red stripe Full grade positions with two silver stars, deputy grade positions with one silver star	2007－ 2023
Grade ribbons	Regiment grade		Purple stripe Full grade positions with two silver stars, deputy grade positions with one silver star	2007－ 2023
Grade ribbons	Battalion grade		Deep blue stripe Full grade positions with two silver stars, deputy grade positions with one silver star	2007－ 2023
Grade ribbons	Company grade		Light blue stripe Full grade positions with two silver stars, deputy grade positions with one silver star	2007－ 2023
Grade ribbons	Platoon grade		Light green stripe All of grade marked with one silver star	2007－ 2023
Time in service ribbons	一			2007－ 2023
Time in service ribbons	2 years			2007－ 2023
Time in service ribbons	3 years			2007－ 2023
Time in service ribbons	4 years			2007－ 2023
Time in service ribbons	5 years			2007－ 2023
Time in service ribbons	10 years			2007－ 2023
Padding ribbon				2007－ 2023

=== 2010s ===
Type	Name	Example	说明	Period awarded
Order of the Heroic Exemplar	First Class			2011－ 2018
Order of the Heroic Exemplar	Second Class			2011－ 2018
Heroic Exemplar Medal		Please upload image		2018－2022
Meritorious Service Medal	First Class		2011－2022	
Meritorious Service Medal	Second Class		2011－2022	
Meritorious Service Medal	Third Class		2011－2022	
Medal of National Defense Service	Gold Medal		2011－2022	
Medal of National Defense Service	Silver medal		2011－2022	
Medal of National Defense Service	Bronze Medal		2011－2022	
Medal of Guarding the Frontiers	Gold Medal		2011－2022	
Medal of Guarding the Frontiers	Silver Medal		2011－2022	
Medal of Guarding the Frontiers	Bronze Medal		2011－2022	
Medal of Devotion for National Defense	Gold medal		2011－2022	
Medal of Devotion for National Defense	Silver medal		2011－2022	
Medal of Devotion for National Defense	Bronze medal		2011－2022	
Commemorative Medal of Peace Mission			2011－2022	
Medal of Performing Combat Mission			2011－2022	
Medal of Performing Vital Mission			2011－2022	
Air Force Meritorious Flight Officer Gold Medal of Honor		Please upload image	2011－2022	
Meritorious Flight Officer Medal	Gold Medal	Please upload image	2011－2022	
Meritorious Flight Officer Medal	Silver Medal	Please upload image	2011－2022	
Meritorious Flight Officer Medal	Bronze Medal	Please upload image	2011－2022	
Air Staff Medal of Honor	Gold Medal	Please upload image	2011－2022	
Air Staff Medal of Honor	Silver Medal	Please upload image	2011－2022	
Air Staff Medal of Honor	Bronze Medal	Please upload image	2011－2022	

=== 1980s ===
Type	Name	Example	Explanation	Period awarded
Red Star Medal of Honor and Merit	First class	Please upload image		1988
Red Star Medal of Honor and Merit	Second class	Please upload image		1988
Meritorious Service Medal of Independence				1988
Meritorious Service Medal of Victory		Please upload image		1988

=== 1970s ===
Type	Name	Example	Comment	Period awarded
Heroic Exemplar Medal	First Class			1979－2011
Heroic Exemplar Medal	Second Class			1979－2011
Meritorious Service Medal	First Class			1979－2011
Meritorious Service Medal	Second Class			1979－2011
Meritorious Service Medal	Third Class			1979－2011
Meritorious Service Medal	Special Class	Please upload image		1979－1988

=== 1950s ===
Type	Name	Example	Comment	Period awarded
Order of August 1st	First Class			1954－1957
Order of August 1st	Second Class			1954－1957
Order of August 1st	Third Class			1954－1957
August First Medal				1954－1957
Order of Independence and Freedom	First Class			1954－1957
Order of Independence and Freedom	Second Class			1954－1957
Order of Independence and Freedom	Third Class			1954－1957
Order of Independence and Freedom Medal				1954－1957
Order of Liberation	First Class			1954－1957
Order of Liberation	Second Class			1954－1957
Order of Liberation	Third Class			1954－1957
Order of Liberation Medal				1954－1957

== See also ==
- Grades of the armed forces of China
- Orders, decorations, and medals of China
- Honorary titles (PLA)
- Occupational titles in China
