= Orders, decorations, and medals of China =

The following is a list of the orders and medals issued by the People's Republic of China since its founding. The Working Committee on Party and State Merit and Honor Commendation is responsible for coordinating the work of Party and state merit and honor commendation.

== History ==
In the early days of the founding of the People's Republic of China, Mao Zedong and other leaders believed that the national honor system was a relic of old society, and that the pursuit of medals would encourage the prevalence of individualism and selfishness in society, which was inconsistent with the political moral standards of "selflessness". Therefore, the national honor system of the People's Republic of China had not been fully established before 2016 and was in a blank state during the Cultural Revolution period. China, together with Switzerland, South Sudan, Eritrea, etc., was listed as one of the few countries in the world that had not set up a national honours system, although it did have a list of military medals.

In recent years, calls were made for the government of China to improve the national honour system and make to award national medals. In 2007, the Ministry of Civil Affairs announced the decision to establish a national honour system in an effort to "unite the sons and daughters of China with common values." On December 27, 2015, the 18th session of the Standing Committee of the Twelfth National People's Congress passed the Law of the People's Republic of China on National Medals and Titles of Honour, which came into force on January 1, 2016. According to the provisions of this law, the state establishes the Order of the Republic, which is awarded to outstanding people who have made great contributions and made outstanding contributions to the construction of socialism with Chinese characteristics and the defense of the country. The Friendship Medal will be awarded to foreigners who have made outstanding contributions to China's socialist modernization drive, to promoting exchanges and cooperation with other countries, and to maintaining world peace. The National honorary title shall be established to award outstanding persons who have made significant contributions and enjoyed high reputation in various fields and industries such as economy, society, national defense, foreign affairs, education, science and technology, culture, public health, sports and so on. The July 1 Medal is awarded to outstanding party members. These five highest orders of honour in China form the core of its newly established system for merit and honour. The first August 1 Medal and the Friendship Medal were conferred on 28 July 2017 and 8 June 2018 respectively, the Republic Medal and the National Medal of Honour on 29 September 2019, and the July 1 Medal on 29 June 2021.

== Precedent ==
National medals and titles of national honour are usually awarded once every five years on the fifth and tenth anniversaries of the founding of the Chinese Communist Party (CCP), the People's Republic of China and the People's Liberation Army, and may be awarded at other times if necessary. The Standing Committee of the National People's Congress is responsible for the proposal of nomination of prospective individuals for inclusion to the national honours list to be awarded for these occasions.

== Civilian ==
=== Medals ===
Name (in English)	Name (in Chinese)	Medal	Issuing authority	Award Criteria	Date of establishment
Republic Medal	共和国勋章		President of China; Standing Committee of the National People's Congress	Distinguished personages who have made great contributions and established outstanding achievements in the construction of socialism with Chinese characteristics and the defence of the country	2016-01-01
Friendship Medal	友谊勋章		President of China	Foreigners who have made outstanding contributions to China's socialist modernization drive, the promotion of Sino-foreign exchanges and cooperation, and the maintenance of world peace	2016-01-01
July 1 Medal	七一勋章		General Secretary of the Chinese Communist Party	Chinese Communist Party members who have made outstanding contributions to the great cause of socialism with Chinese characteristics and to the great new project of party building	2017-07-22

=== Honorary titles and awards ===
Name (in English)	Name (in Chinese)	Ribbon	Issuing authority	Award Criteria	Date of establishment
National honorary titles	国家荣誉称号		President of China, Standing Committee of the NPC	Distinguished persons who have made significant contributions and enjoyed high reputation in various fields and industries such as economy, society, national defence, foreign affairs, education, science and technology, culture, health, sports and so on	2016-01-01
Chinese Government's Friendship Award	中国政府友谊奖		State Council	Foreign experts who have made outstanding contributions to China's socialist modernization and reform and opening up	1991
Aerospace Meritorious Service Award	航天功勋奖		CCP Central Committee, State Council, Central Military Commission	Astronauts from the People's Liberation Army Astronaut Corps who completed the Shenzhou spacecraft missions	2003-11-07
Outstanding communist party member award	全国优秀共产党员		CCP Central Committee	Party members that is ideologically and politically firm, consistent with the Central Committee with strong working style, high prestige, excellent working ability and outstanding achievements.	2006-06-30
Outstanding party affairs worker award	全国优秀党务工作者奖		Central Committee		2006-06-30
National model labourers award	全国劳动模范奖		Central Committee, State Council		1950-09-25
National frontier workers award	全国先进工作者奖		Central Committee, State Council		1960-06-01
Pioneer of Reform Award	改革先锋奖		Central Committee, State Council	People who have made outstanding contributions to China's reform and opening up	2018-12-18
China Reform Friendship Medal	中国改革友谊奖章		Central Committee, State Council	Foreigners who have given support and help to China's reform and opening up	2018-12-18
Highest Science and Technology Award	国家最高科学技术奖		Central Committee, State Council	Having made major breakthroughs in the frontiers of contemporary science and technology or made outstanding achievements in the development of science and technology; Scientific workers who create great economic or social benefits in the course of scientific and technological innovation, transformation of scientific and technological achievements and industrialization of high technology.	2019-01-08 (Medal)
International Science and Technology Cooperation Award	国际科学技术合作奖		Central Committee, State Council	Foreigners or organizations that have made contributions to China's scientific and technological undertakings.	2019-01-08 (Medal)

== People's Liberation Army ==
=== Order ===
Name (in English)	Name (in Chinese)	Ribbon	Rank	Date of establishment	Present situation
August 1 Medal	八一勋章(新)			2017-06-12	Still issued
Medal of Heroic Exemplar	英雄模范勋章		1	1979-03-23	Still issued
Medal of Heroic Exemplar	英雄模范勋章		2	1979-03-23	Still issued
Order of Bayi (1955)	八一勋章		1	1955-02-12	No longer issued
Order of Bayi (1955)	八一勋章		2	1955-02-12	No longer issued
Order of Bayi (1955)	八一勋章		3	1955-02-12	No longer issued
Order of Independence and Freedom	独立自由勋章		1	1955-02-12	No longer issued
Order of Independence and Freedom	独立自由勋章		2	1955-02-12	No longer issued
Order of Independence and Freedom	独立自由勋章		3	1955-02-12	No longer issued
Order of Liberation	解放勋章		1	1955-02-12	No longer issued
Order of Liberation	解放勋章		2	1955-02-12	No longer issued
Order of Liberation	解放勋章		3	1955-02-12	No longer issued
Honor Medal of the Red Star	红星功勋荣誉章		1	1988-07-01	No longer issued
Honor Medal of the Red Star	红星功勋荣誉章		2	1988-07-01	No longer issued
Honor Medal of Independence Merit	独立功勋荣誉章			1988-07-01	No longer issued
Honor Medal of Victory Merit	胜利功勋荣誉章			1988-07-01	No longer issued

=== Medal ===
Name (in English)	Name (in Chinese)	Ribbon	Rank	Date of establishment	Present situation
Meritorious Service Medal	立功奖章		1	1979-03-23	Still issued
Meritorious Service Medal	立功奖章		2	1979-03-23	Still issued
Meritorious Service Medal	立功奖章		3	1979-03-23	Still issued
Good Soldier Badge	优秀士兵证章	None		1996-08-01	Still issued
Excellent Cadet Badge	优秀学员证章	None		1996-08-01	Still issued
Commemorative Medal of National Defense Service	国防服役纪念章		Gold	2011-08-01	Still issued
Commemorative Medal of National Defense Service	国防服役纪念章		Silver	2011-08-01	Still issued
Commemorative Medal of National Defense Service	国防服役纪念章		Copper	2011-08-01	Still issued
Commemorative Medal of Defending the Frontiers	卫国戍边纪念章		Gold	2011-08-01	Still issued
Commemorative Medal of Defending the Frontiers	卫国戍边纪念章		Silver	2011-08-01	Still issued
Commemorative Medal of Defending the Frontiers	卫国戍边纪念章		Copper	2011-08-01	Still issued
Commemorative Medal of Devotion for National Defense	献身国防纪念章		Gold	2011-08-01	Still issued
Commemorative Medal of Devotion for National Defense	献身国防纪念章		Silver	2011-08-01	Still issued
Commemorative Medal of Devotion for National Defense	献身国防纪念章		Copper	2011-08-01	Still issued
Commemorative Medal of Peace Mission	和平使命纪念章			2011-08-01	Still issued
Commemorative Medal of Performing Combat/Vital Mission	执行作战和重大任务纪念章		Combat Mission	2011-08-01	Still issued
Commemorative Medal of Performing Combat/Vital Mission	执行作战和重大任务纪念章		Major Task	2011-08-01	Still issued

=== Ribbons ===
Qualification badges (Chinese: 级别资历章) are a series of decorations of People's Liberation Army Type 07 in the form of small ribbons mounted on small metal bars indicating military rank, billet, or length of service. Only PLA/PAPF officers can wear qualification badges, PLA/PAPF soldiers wear National Defense Service Medal instead.

==== Billet and rank ribbons ====
Each row has three ribbons; a blank white ribbon is used to fill out a row that only has two ribbons. Ranks and billets can be inferred from the number of rows. The rule is:

- 7 rows: Level of Vice Chairman of CMC (Chinese: 中央军委副主席) and CMC members (Chinese: 中央军委委员)
- 6 rows: Level of Theater Command (Chinese: 大军区级)
- 5 rows: Level of Corps (Chinese: 军级)
- 4 rows: Level of Division (Chinese: 师级)
- 3 rows: Level of Regiment/Brigade (Chinese: 团级)
- 2 rows: Level of Battalion (Chinese: 营级)
- 1 row: Level of Company (Chinese: 连级) and Platoon (Chinese: 排级)

The ribbon at the middle of top row is called a rank ribbon (Chinese: 级别略章) and has at least one five-pointed star on it. One star represent for deputy posts (except level of vice chairman of CMC and CMC members and platoon), and two stars for principal posts. The color of stars also differs from ranks, over and include level of corps it is golden and below it is silver.

==== Length of service ribbons ====
All ribbons except for the rank/billet ribbon centered at the top row are used to represent the wearer's length of service, similar to the U.S. military's service stripes.

===== Ribbon list =====
Ribbon class	Ribbon name	Description	Design
Rank	Level of Vice Chairman of CMC and CMC members	Lemon yellow background with a yellow star surrounded by olive branches in the middle.	
Rank	Level of Theater Command	Saffron yellow background with yellow stars in the middle, one for deputy posts and two for principal posts.	
Rank	Level of Corps	Khaki background with yellow stars in the middle, one for deputy posts and two for principal posts.	
Rank	Level of Division	Red background with silver stars in the middle, one for deputy posts and two for principal posts.	
Rank	Level of Regiment/Brigade	Dark purple background with silver stars in the middle, one for deputy posts and two for principal posts.	
Rank	Level of Battalion	Dark blue background with silver stars in the middle, one for deputy posts and two for principal posts.	
Rank	Level of Company	Light blue background with silver stars in the middle, one for deputy posts and two for principal posts.	
Rank	Level of Platoon	Grass green background with a silver star in the middle.	
Service length	One Year Ribbon	Green background with double yellow single red stripe.	
Service length	Two Years Ribbon	Dark blue background with double white stripes.	
Service length	Three Years Ribbon	Yellow background with triple red stripes.	
Service length	Four Years Ribbon	Grey blue background with tetrad yellow strips.	
Service length	Five Years Ribbon	Penta Red, white, dark blue, yellow, dark green strips.	
Service length	Ten Years Ribbon	Decade red, light blue, yellow, light green, yellow, dark blue, yellow, dark purple, yellow, red strips.	
Padding	Supplementary ribbon used when service length ribbons cannot fully fill the row. Its use is avoided where possible.	Light grey	

== Swords ==
- Sword of Deep Blue (Chinese: 深蓝之剑) – Awarded as a Naval honor
- Sword of The Sea (Chinese: 海之剑) – Awarded to graduating cadets of Dalian Naval Academy
- Sword of Military Spirit (Chinese: 军魂剑) – Awarded to graduating cadets of PLA Nanjing Political College

== See also ==
- Service ribbon
- Order
- List of military decorations
- List of civil awards and decorations
- Ranks of the People's Liberation Army
- Socialist orders of merit
