= Death of Wang Xiaolong =

Chinese coast guard (1995–2023)

Martyr Wang Xiaolong
- 汪晓龙
- Official portrait of Wang
- Born: December 1995; Fuyang, Anhui, China
- Died: March 24, 2023 (aged 27) off of Shanwei, Guangdong, China
- Cause of death: Murder
- Burial place: Taihe County, Fuyang, Anhui
- Education: Anhui Vocational College of Police Officers
- Military career
- Allegiance: China
- Branch: China Coast Guard
- Service years: 2019–2023
- Rank: Sergeant
- Service number: 0115479
- Units: Chengqu District Coast Guard Station, Shanwei Municipal Coast Guard Bureau
- Awards: Martyr; Gold Medal of Devotion for National Defense; Meritorious Service Medal 1st Class; China Youth May 4 medal

Wang Xiaolong (Chinese: 汪晓龙; Chinese: Wāng Xiǎolóng; December 1995 – March 24, 2023) was a Chinese Coast Guard who was killed whilst intercepting a smuggling operation. He is the first China Coast Guard (CCG) member to be killed in the line of duty and the first CCG member to be made a martyr for heroism.

== Early life ==
Wang Xiaolong was born in December 1995 in Fuyang, Anhui. He studied at the Anhui Vocational College of Police Officers. After graduation, he enlisted in the Guangdong Provincial Coast Guard Bureau in July 2019. He joined the Chinese Communist Party on December 18, 2020. He was assigned to the Chengqu District Coast Guard Station of the Shanwei Municipal Coast Guard Bureau. He assisted in putting out a ship fire on November 17, 2021, and intercepting illegal immigrants on May 13, 2022.

== Death ==
On March 23, 2023, the Shanwei Municipal Coast Guard Bureau learned of offshore smugglers near Jilong Hill. Around 3:10 AM on March 24, 2023, the suspect ship was intercepted and boarded by the CCG; the boarding was carried out by Wang Xiaolong, 1st Lieutenant Lin Qingping, Wang Shengsen, and Chen Yongxi in a rigid inflatable boat. A struggle ensued with Wang Xiaolong and Lin attempting to subdue a suspect. Another suspect escaped to the bridge and accelerated the ship, causing Wang, Lin, and the first suspect to go overboard. Lin's left leg was amputated by the propeller, and he was rescued by Wang Shengsen and Chen. Wang Xiaolong was declared missing in action; his body was found on March 26 near the Magong Harbour in Magong subdistrict. An autopsy determined that he was killed by the propeller.

Wang's funeral was on April 10 in Fuyang and was attended by over 300 people. He was buried in Taihe county. He was posthumously made a Martyr and, with Lin, received the Meritorious Service Medal 1st Class from the CCG. A statue of Wang was later erected at the Shanwei Municipal Coast Guard Bureau. Additionally, Wang received the Gold Medal of Devotion for National Defense, while Lin received the Bronze Medal of Devotion for National Defense. Wang Shengsen and Chen Yongxi, who assisted in the operation, both received 3rd class Meritorious Service Medals.

By April 11, around 10 suspects were arrested in relation to the case. A joint investigation by the Guangdong Coast Guard and the Ministry of Public Security determined the suspects had links to a Guangdong-area smuggling triad. By March 24, 2025, one suspect was convicted of murdering Wang and sentenced to death; another received life imprisonment; more than one other received multi-year imprisonment.

== Service record ==
Wang participated in 131 cases, over 500 arrests, and the seizure of 95 ships and over CN¥100 million of evidence.

=== Awards and decorations ===
- Martyr
- Meritorious Service Medal 1st Class (posthumous)
- Gold Medal of Devotion for National Defense (posthumous)
- China Youth May 4 medal (posthumous)
- 5 personal commendations

== Personal life ==
Wang planned to marry his fiancée at the end of 2023.

== See also ==
- List of People's Armed Police personnel killed in the line of duty
