= Xie Xianqi =

Chinese blasting expert

- 谢先启
- Born: 28 December 1960 (age 65); Honghu, Hubei, China
- Education: PLA Engineering Corps Command College; PLA Naval University of Engineering; Wuhan University of Science and Technology
- Scientific career
- Fields: Engineering blasting
- Workplaces: Jianghan University

Chinese name
- Simplified Chinese: 谢先启
- Traditional Chinese: 謝先啟
Transcriptions
Standard Mandarin
- Hanyu Pinyin: Xiè Xiānqǐ

Xie Xianqi (born 28 December 1960) is a Chinese blasting expert who is dean of Institute of Explosion and Engineering Blasting Technology at Jianghan University and an academician of the Chinese Academy of Engineering, formerly served as chairman of Wuhan Municipal Construction Group Co., Ltd., Wuhan Airport Development Group Co., Ltd. and Wuhan Blasting Company.

== Biography ==
Xie was born in Honghu, Hubei, on 28 December 1960. He enlisted in the People's Liberation Army in November 1979, and was despatched to the National Defense Construction Office of the 69th Army in Beijing Military Region. In 1984, he was admitted to PLA Engineering Corps Command College, where he majored in mine blasting. He earned his bachelor's degree in computer management and application from PLA Naval University of Engineering in 1996 and master's degree in mining engineering from Wuhan University of Science and Technology in 2005, respectively.

In April 1988, he became deputy director of Blasting Laboratory of the Institute of Science and Technology, Wuhan Municipal Engineering Corporation. In December 1992 he became deputy general manager of Wuhan Blasting Company, rising to general manager in November 2004. He rose to become chairman of Wuhan Municipal Construction Group Co., Ltd. and Wuhan Blasting Company in December 2004. In May 2015, he was appointed chairman of Wuhan Airport Development Group Co., Ltd., concurrently serving as chairman of Wuhan Blasting Company. In November 2018, he was hired by Jianghan University as dean of Institute of explosion and Engineering Blasting Technology.

== Honours and awards ==
- 27 November 2017 Member of the Chinese Academy of Engineering (CAE)
