= Du Fuguo =

Chinese military commander

- 杜富国
- Born: December 3, 1991 (age 34); Meitan County, Guizhou, China
- Military career
- Allegiance: PRC
- Branch: People's Liberation Army Ground Force
- Service years: 2010–present
- Rank: Staff Sergeant
- Unit: Engineering Troops
- Awards: August 1 Medal (2022); Model Worker of the Nation (2019); "Mine Clearing Hero Soldier" Honorary Title (2019); Hero Medal (2019); Meritorious Service Medal (China) (2018); Model Soldier of the Army (2019); Role Model of the Times (2019); 2018 Touching China Person of the Year; Outstanding Soldier; Outstanding NCO

Du Fuguo (born December 3, 1991) is a native of Meitan County, Guizhou Province, China. He currently serves as a broadcaster for the Southern Theater Command Ground Force's official WeChat account, holding the rank of Staff Sergeant in the Chinese People's Liberation Army Ground Force. On October 11, 2018, as the leader of the fourth squadron of the Yunnan mine clearance team under the Southern Theater Command Ground Force, Du was seriously injured during a border mine clearance operation while shielding his comrades, resulting in the loss of both hands and eyesight. He was awarded the honorary title of "Mine-Clearing Hero Soldier" and the Meritorious Service Medal (China).

== Life ==
Du Fuguo was born in December 1991 in Taiping Village, Xinglong Town, Meitan County, Zunyi, Guizhou Province, China. He has three younger siblings: Du Fujia, a nurse; Du Fumin, a doctor; and Du Fuqiang, who is also a soldier. Du enlisted in the People's Liberation Army (PLA) in December 2010 and joined the Chinese Communist Party in November 2016. To deal with a large number of landmines and explosives left over from the Sino-Vietnamese War and the two-mountain war in the 1970s and 1980s, on June 15, 2015, with the approval of the General Office of the State Council and the General Office of the Central Military Commission, the Chengdu Military Region dispatched troops to form the Yunnan Section Mine Clearance Command of the China-Vietnam Border. It launched the third large-scale mine clearance operation on the China-Vietnam border, involving more than 30 towns and villages in six counties of Wenshan Prefecture and Honghe Prefecture in Yunnan Province, across 113 minefields with a total area of 81.7 square kilometres. Du Fuguo took the initiative to apply to join the mine clearance team. In the past three years, he has entered and exited the minefield more than a thousand times, worked for more than 300 days in total, transported more than 15 tons of mine-clearing blasting tubes, cleared more than 2,400 mines and explosives in 14 minefields, and handled more than 20 dangerous situations of various types. On the afternoon of October 11, 2018, at 2:40 pm, during a demining operation in Bazi Village, Malipo County, Wenshan Prefecture, Du was inspecting a Type 67 wooden-handled grenade for booby traps when it exploded. To protect his comrades, he absorbed the majority of the blast impact and shrapnel. His protective gear was shredded, and he lost both hands and his eyesight. He lost consciousness at the scene. Afterwards, he was treated at Mengdong Township Clinic, Malipo County People's Hospital, and the PLA's 926 Hospital, where his condition stabilized. After Du Fuguo was injured, a delegation from the army and local authorities came to visit and offer their condolences. After treatment, Du Fuguo has entered the rehabilitation stage and will be fitted with prosthetic limbs.

== Follow-up ==
On the afternoon of November 16, 2018, at the Bazi minefield where Du Fuguo had been injured, soldiers of the Yunnan Demining Unit of the PLA Southern Theater Command Army formed a human chain to verify the final cleared minefield before officially handing it over to residents. This act marked the successful completion of the third large-scale demining operation in the Yunnan section of the China–Vietnam border. Over three years, the PLA thoroughly cleared 57.6 square kilometers of minefields and assisted local governments in permanently fencing off an additional 24.1 square kilometers of hazardous areas. In total, 198,200 landmines and explosive remnants of war were manually removed. Two soldiers were killed in the line of duty, and nearly 40 were wounded during the operation. Following the Yunnan mission, the troops were deployed to continue demining operations in the Guangxi section of the China–Vietnam border. After his injury and rehabilitation, Du Fuguo took on a new role as a voice-over announcer for the official WeChat account of the People's Liberation Army (PLA) Southern Theatre Command Army.

== Honor ==
Du Fuguo was commended twice, once as an "excellent soldier" and once as an "excellent non-commissioned officer". On November 18, 2018, the Southern Theater Command Ground Force decided to award Du Fuguo the first-class merit. On November 24, Chen Anyou, the captain of the Yunnan Mine Sweeping Battalion of the Southern Theater Army, and Zhou Wenchun, the political commissar, came to the ward and presented Du Fuguo with a certificate of merit and a military medal. At the regular press conference of the Ministry of National Defense on November 29, 2018, Colonel Ren Guoqiang, deputy director of the Information Bureau of the Ministry of National Defense and spokesman of the Ministry of National Defense, praised Du Fuguo for facing danger and sacrificing himself to save others, and for demonstrating the mission and responsibility of revolutionary soldiers in the new era with practical actions. He also paid high tribute to Comrade Du Fuguo and expressed sincere condolences to his family. On January 25, 2019, Du Fuguo was recognized as the first "Four Haves" New Era People's Liberation Army Ground Force Model and nine other outstanding soldiers, including Li Qingkun, Hou Guoling, Yang Xiangguo, Kuai Wei, Liu Jiaping, Lu Jianmin, Qian Lizhi, Zhang Shangnian and Leng Xuebing. Army Commander General Han Weiguo and Political Commissar General Liu Lei personally recognized Du Fuguo. Han Weiguo praised Du Fuguo for "voluntarily volunteering to go to clear mines, saying 'let me do it' in the face of danger, being strong despite being seriously injured, and being an amazing hero". He hugged Du Fuguo affectionately and shed tears during the award ceremony, which caused a tremendous response. In February 2019, Du Fuguo was named one of the 2018 "Touching China" Persons of the Year by China Central Television (CCTV). In May of the same year, the Publicity Department of the Chinese Communist Party awarded him the title of "Role Model of the Times" and publicly promoted his story across the country. On July 2, 2019, the Publicity Department of the CCP, the Political Work Department of the Central Military Commission, and the Communist Youth League of China jointly held a report meeting at the Great Hall of the People to share Du Fuguo's exemplary deeds. On July 31, 2019, Xi Jinping, Chairman of the Central Military Commission, signed an order conferring upon Du Fuguo the honorary title of "Heroic Demining Warrior." In September 2019, he was also recognized as a "National Model of Dedication and Devotion." On July 27, 2022, Du Fuguo was awarded the August 1 Medal as part of the second group of recipients.
