= Ranks of the People's Liberation Army =

Ranks of the People's Liberation Army may refer to:

- Ranks of the People's Liberation Army Ground Force
- Ranks of the People's Liberation Army Navy
- Ranks of the People's Liberation Army Air Force
