= Wang Yu =

Wang Yu may refer to:

- Wang Yu (chancellor) (died 768), chancellor of Tang Dynasty
- Jimmy Wang Yu (1943–2022), Taiwanese-Hong Kong martial arts actor
- Wong Yue (1955–2008), Hong Kong martial arts film actor
- Wang Yu (filmmaker), Chinese director and cinematographer, active since the 1990s
- Wang Yu (general) (born 1964), People's Liberation Army Navy admiral
- Wang Yu (lawyer) (born 1971), Chinese human rights lawyer
- Wang Yu (tennis) (born 1981), Chinese tennis player
- Wang Yu (chess player) (born 1982), chess player from China
- Wang Yu (high jumper) (born 1991), Chinese high jumper
- Wang Yu (footballer) (born 2002), Chinese football player

== See also ==
- Wang You (Wang Yu in Wade–Giles, 1910–1997), Chinese biochemist
