= Jianghan =

Jianghan may refer to:

- Jianghan District, in Wuhan, Hubei, China
- Jianghan University, in Wuhan, Hubei, China
- Jianghan Plain, in central and eastern Hubei, China

== See also ==
- Kong Hon or Jiang Han, Hong Kong actor
