= Zhao Yongfu =

- 赵永甫
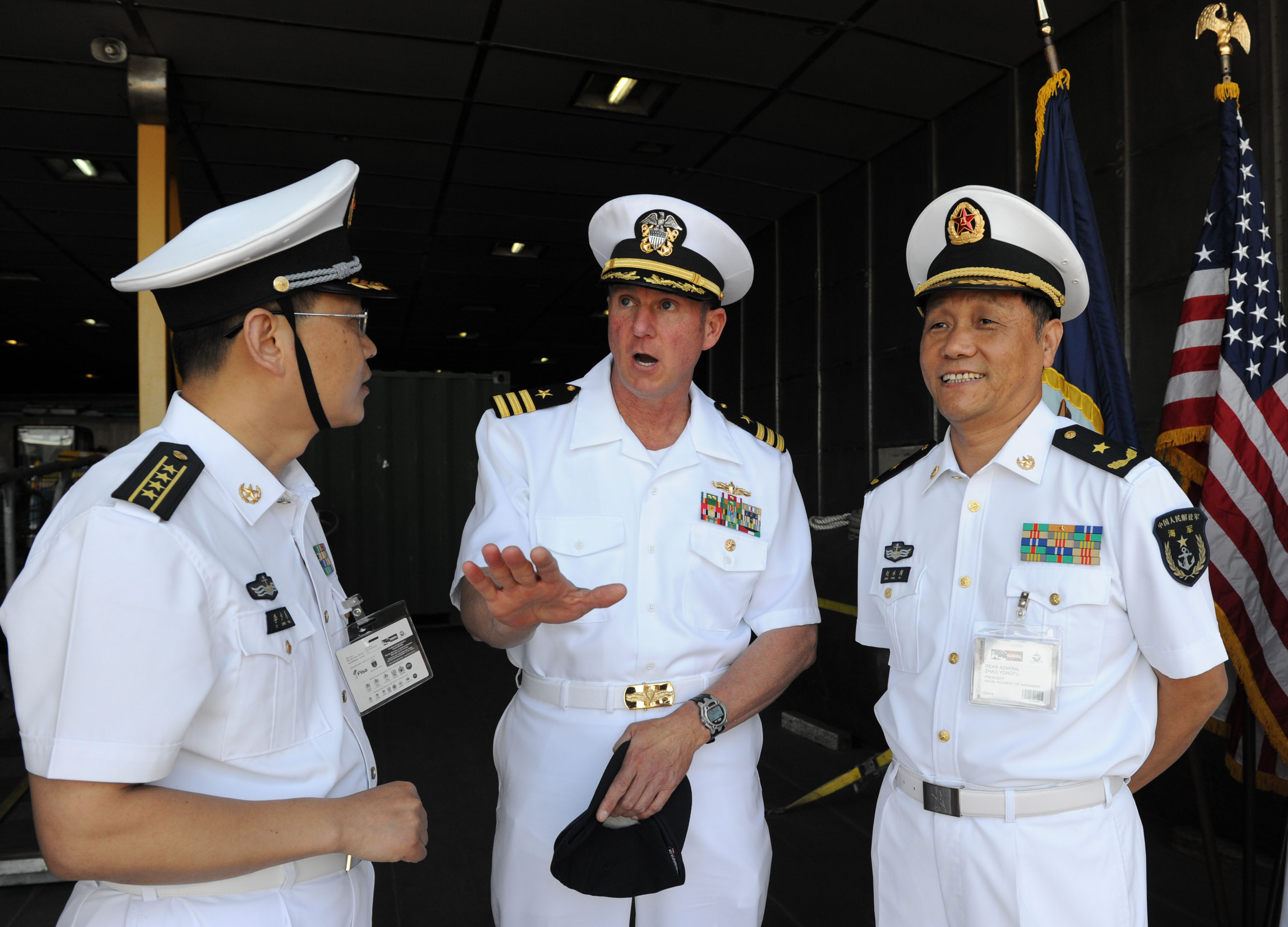
- Zhao Yongfu, right speaks with Cmdr. Mark Becker, center, mission commander of Southern Partnership Station 2011.

President of the PLA Naval University of Engineering
- In office 2011–2014
- Succeeded by: Han Xiaohu

President of the PLA Naval Academy of Armament
- In office 2008–2011
- Succeeded by: Wang Yu

Personal details
- Party: Chinese Communist Party

Military service
- Allegiance: China
- Branch/service: People's Liberation Army Navy
- Rank: Rear Admiral

Zhao Yongfu (simplified Chinese: 赵永甫; traditional Chinese: 趙永甫; pinyin: Zhào Yǒngfǔ) is a rear admiral (shao jiang) of the People's Liberation Army Navy (PLAN) of China. He served as president of the PLA Naval Academy of Armament from 2008 to 2011, and as president of the PLA Naval University of Engineering from May 2011 to December 2014.

== Biography ==
He assumed various posts in the People's Liberation Army Navy (PLAN), including president of the PLA Naval Academy of Armament, executive director of the Chinese Society of Naval Architecture and Marine Engineering (CSNAME), and vice-chairman of the China Defense Science and Technology Information Institute. He attained the rank of rear admiral (shao jiang) in July 2009. In May 2011, he was appointed president of the PLA Naval University of Engineering, and held that office until December 2014.

Military offices
Preceded by ?	President of the PLA Naval Academy of Armament; 2008–2011	Succeeded by Wang Yu (汪玉)
Preceded by ?	President of the PLA Naval University of Engineering; 2011–2014	Succeeded by Han Xiaohu (韩小虎)
