= Ma Weiming =

Chinese admiral and engineer

- 马伟明
- Born: 6 April 1960 (age 66); Yangzhong, Jiangsu, China
- Education: Tsinghua University; PLA Naval University of Engineering
- Occupation: Electrical Engineer
- Employer: PLA Naval University of Engineering
- Known for: Electromagnetic catapult system
- Political party: Chinese Communist Party
- Honours: August 1 Medal

Ma Weiming (simplified Chinese: 马伟明; traditional Chinese: 馬偉明; born 6 April 1960) is a Chinese electrical engineer. He is a professor of the PLA Naval University of Engineering. He is an academician of the Chinese Academy of Engineering and holds the military rank of rear admiral. He led the development of the electromagnetic catapult system for the Type 003 aircraft carrier and the development of electromagnetic railguns. In 2017, he was awarded the August 1 Medal, the highest honor of the People's Liberation Army.

== Biography ==
Ma was born in April 1960 in Yangzhong, Jiangsu, China. He graduated from the Department of Electrical Engineering of PLA Naval University of Engineering in Wuhan with a BS degree in 1982 and an MS degree in 1987. He earned his Ph.D. in electrical engineering from Tsinghua University in 1996.

Ma is Professor and Director of the Institute of Power Electronic Technique Application at the Naval University of Engineering. In 2001, he was elected a member of the Chinese Academy of Engineering (CAE) at the age of 41, making him one of the youngest academicians of the CAE. He also serves as Vice President of the China Association for Science and Technology. Considered a top naval engineer in China, he holds the military rank of rear admiral.

Ma was elected an alternate of the 18th Central Committee of the Chinese Communist Party in 2012 and the 19th Central Committee in 2017. In November 2019, he was promoted to full member at the Fourth Plenum of the 19th Central Committee.

== Contributions ==
Ma has led the development of China's electromagnetic catapult system for launching aircraft from carriers (similar to the Electromagnetic Aircraft Launch System of the United States), which is more efficient than the older steam catapult system. It is expected to be deployed on the Type 003, the PLA Navy's third aircraft carrier, which would make China the second country to develop the technology, after the US.

In January 2019, Chinese media reported that Ma's team had developed electromagnetic railguns capable of firing projectiles at very high velocity, with longer range and higher accuracy than traditional artillery. Military observers expect a modified version of the Type 055 destroyer to be equipped with the railgun, which would make China the first country to deploy the weapon on an actual warship. Ma is also credited for silencing noise of the PLA Navy's submarine's propulsion system thus making them less detectable on sonar.

Since the late 1980s, Ma has advised and guided more than 400 masters and doctoral students. Two of them, Xiao Fei and Wang Dong, were awarded rare peacetime First-Class Merit Awards by the PLA for their research.

== Honors ==
- Two State Technological Invention Awards (Third Class)
- State Science and Technology Progress Award (First Class), 2000
- Ho Leung Ho Lee Prize in Technological Sciences, 2015
- Order of August First, 2017
