= Friendship Medal (China) =

China's highest order of honour for foreigners

Friendship Medal 友谊勋章
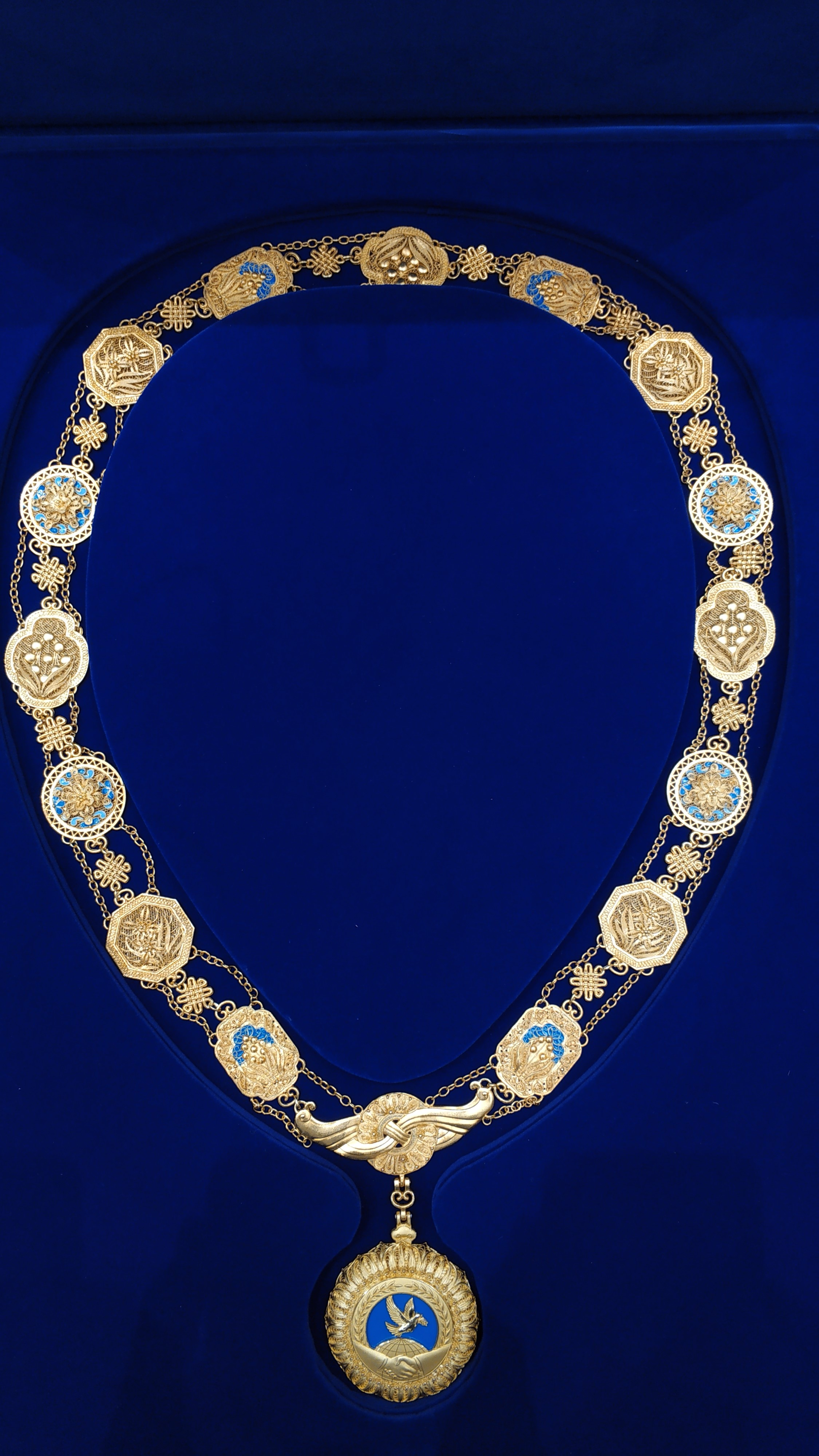
- Collar of the order

Awarded by China
- Type: Order
- Country: China
- Eligibility: Foreign nationals
- Awarded for: Significant contributions to support China's modernization and maintaining world peace
- Status: Active
- Grand Master: President of China
- Colours: Gold and blue

Statistics
- First induction: 2018
- Last induction: 2026
- Total inductees: 13

Precedence
- Equivalent: Medal of the Republic

The Friendship Medal is the highest honorary medal bestowed on foreign nationals by the People's Republic of China. The bestowal is decided by the Standing Committee of the National People's Congress and presented by the President of China.

On 27 December 2015, the Standing Committee of the National People's Congress passed a law establishing two national medals, the Medal of the Republic and the Friendship Medal, effective on 1 January 2016.

The Friendship Medal is bestowed on foreign nationals who have made outstanding contributions to China's socialist modernization, the promotion of exchange and cooperation between China and foreign countries, and the protection of world peace. All the recipients have cooperated and participated actively in supporting China's social, cultural, economic and international developments to various degrees.

The first Friendship Medal was awarded by President Xi Jinping to Vladimir Putin, President of Russia, on 8 June 2018.

== History ==
In August 2015, the 16th session of the Standing Committee of the Twelfth National People's Congress first considered the Law of the People's Republic of China on National Medals and National Honorary Titles (Draft).

In December 2015, the 18th session of the Standing Committee of the Twelfth National People's Congress was held in Beijing, where the Law of the People's Republic of China on National Medals and National Honorary Titles (Draft) was considered for the second time. In January 2016, the Law of the People's Republic of China on National Medals and National Honorary Titles was finally issued, which established the Friendship Medal.

In June 2018, the first Friendship Medal was awarded. With the approval of the Central Committee of the Chinese Communist Party (CCP), the ceremony of awarding the state medals and state honors of the People's Republic of China was held in the Great Hall. The President of China, CCP General Secretary, and Chairman of the Central Military Commission attended the ceremony, and both made speeches.

== Appearance ==
The major colors used for the Friendship Medal are gold and blue. The body of the medal adopted various elements; a dove which represents peace and love is placed at the centre of the medal plate, whereas earth is also engraved on the bottom of the dove, followed by a sign of hand-shaking that symbolises the friendly attitude from China to other countries. The medal plate is surrounded by lotus petals, a flower that represents pureness, peace and harmony in traditional Chinese culture. Likewise, even more, traditional elements can be observed from the chain of the Friendship Medal. This includes the use of Chinese decorative knots (solidarity), peony flowers (wealth/prosperity), jade (earth) and auspicious clouds (luck/fortune).

The whole medal is handmade with traditional crafts. An example could be the filigree inlay, which is also known as the fine gold arts. Such a heritage crafting technique can be spotted especially on the lotus petals as well as the engraved golden symbols. Another worth-noting technique is silk-pinching enamel, which is used to craft most of the blue parts of the Friendship Medal. The colour blue not only stood out from the rest of the gold medals, but it is also used to adorn the calm and stable colour symbolism within the traditional Chinese culture.

== Policies and regulations ==
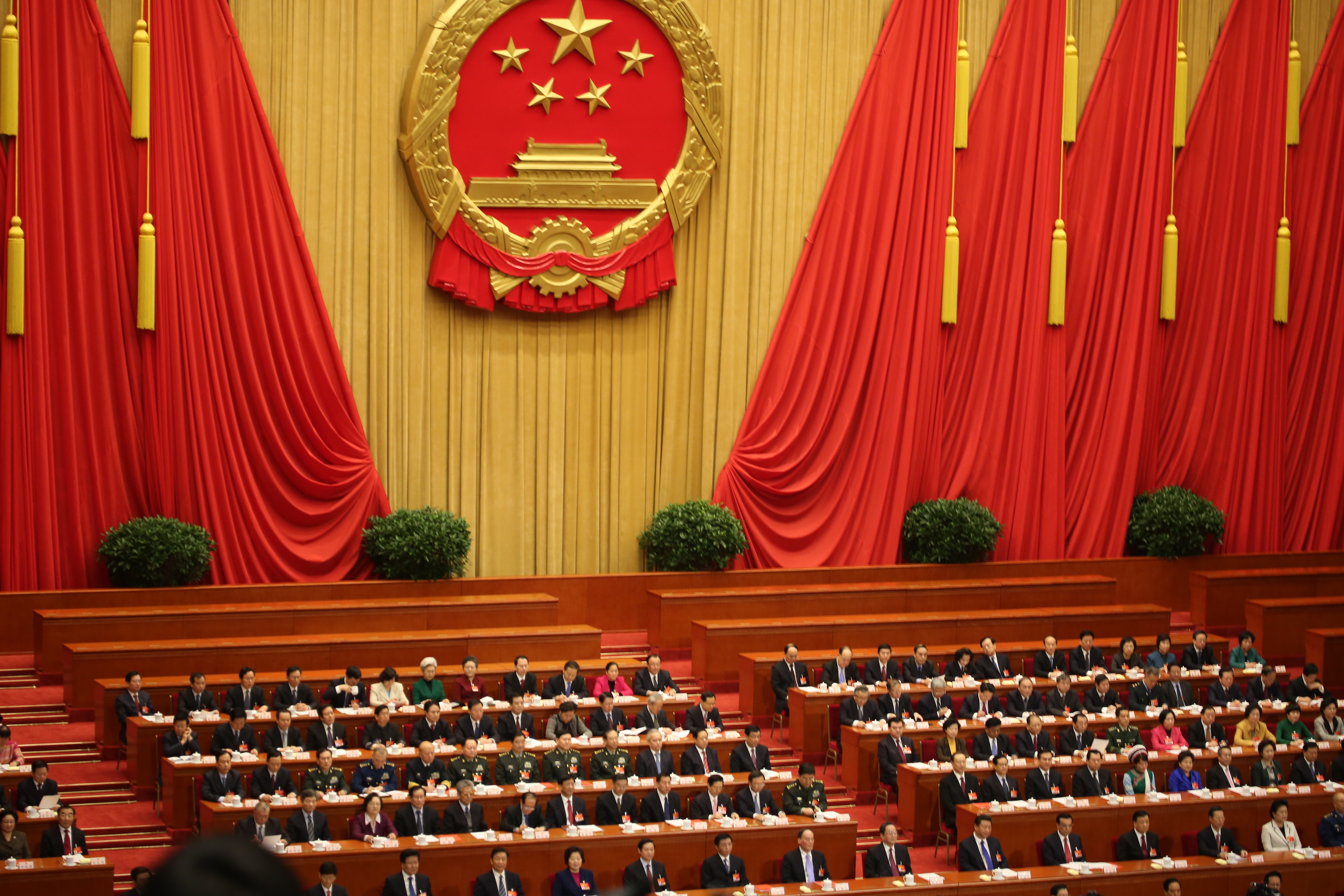
Twelfth National People's Congress

According to the Law of the People's Republic of China on National Medals and National Honorary Titles, state medals and state honors can be awarded posthumously. Any recipient who has made outstanding contributions during their lifetime and meets the conditions for awarding the Friendship Medal as stipulated in this law and who dies before the implementation may be awarded state medals and state honors posthumously.

In addition, state medals and state honors are for the lifetime of their recipients but can also be revoked. The Standing Committee of the National People's Congress (NPCSC) has the right to revoke the Friendship Medal if the recipient has been sentenced to imprisonment for a crime or has committed other serious violations of the law or discipline.

== Recipients ==
Name	Image	Position	Date	For
Vladimir Putin		President of Russia	8 June 2018	Recognition of President Putin's long-term commitment to encourage the development of good-neighborliness and comprehensive strategic partnership of cooperation between Russia and China.
Nursultan Nazarbayev		Former President of Kazakhstan	28 April 2019	China proposed the initiative of building the Silk Road Economic Belt, which received an enthusiastic response and solid cooperation from the first President Nazarbayev and all sectors of Kazakh society. He also enhanced the vigorous development of the Shanghai Cooperation Organization and the Conference on Interaction and Confidence-building Measures in Asia.
Raúl Castro		First Secretary of the Communist Party of Cuba, Former President of Cuba	29 September 2019	Raúl Castro has been supporting China to play a greater role in international and regional affairs. He is also an important founder of China–Cuba relations, an active advocator and promoter of China-Latin America relationships.
Maha Chakri Sirindhorn		Princess Royal of Thailand	29 September 2019	She has made irreplaceable and outstanding contributions to the development of China–Thai relations by gaining a deep understanding of China, actively fostering traditional Chinese culture and spreading China–Thai friendship. She's also deeply concerned about the Chinese people and was the first to lend a helping hand after the Wenchuan and Yushu earthquakes and other major natural disasters.
Salim Ahmed Salim		Former Prime Minister of Tanzania	29 September 2019	Salim has made outstanding contributions to the restoration of China's legitimate seat in the United Nations. He always advocated that China and Africa should continuously strengthen friendly exchanges. Salim would have loved to receive the award in person, but was unable to come to China for health reasons. Therefore, his daughter attended the award ceremony instead.
Galina Kulikova		The first vice-chairman of Russian-Chinese Friendship Association	29 September 2019	In 1989, she was elected as the First Vice-president of the Russian-Chinese Friendship Association and went to work at the Russian Embassy in China. Kulikowa has always been committed to developing friendly relations with China and has made outstanding contributions to the promotion of Sino–Russian people-to-people diplomacy.
Jean-Pierre Raffarin		Former Prime Minister of France	29 September 2019	As Prime Minister of France, Raffarin insisted on visiting China as scheduled during the SARS outbreak and gave great political and emotional support to the Chinese people. He attended the first "Belt and Road" International Cooperation Summit Forum and actively contributed to the objective understanding of all sectors in France and Europe in the "Belt and Road" cooperation.
Isabel Crook		Educator	29 September 2019	Isabelle Crook worked at Beijing Foreign Studies University for half a century and was a pioneer in the teaching of English and educational reform in the new China. She trained a large number of foreign language talents for the new China and made outstanding contributions to the Chinese education.
Norodom Monineath		Cambodian Queen Mother	6 November 2020	Norodom Monineath has been actively involved in the cause of Sino–Cambodian friendship and has witnessed the development of the new China. She has special feelings for the Chinese people and actively supports exchanges and cooperation between the two countries in various fields.
Nguyễn Phú Trọng		General Secretary of the Communist Party of Vietnam	31 October 2022	Nguyễn Phú Trọng is steadfast in Marxism and in maintaining the traditional friendship between China and Vietnam, he is also the one who guides and promotes the China-Vietnam Comprehensive Strategic Cooperative Partnership in the new era.
Emomali Rahmon		President of Tajikistan	5 July 2024	First friendship medal awarded in a foreign country. It was awarded in a special arrangement to express the Chinese people’s friendly feelings towards President Rahmon and the people of Tajikistan.
Dilma Rousseff		Chairwoman of the New Development Bank, Former President of Brazil	29 September 2024	Dilma Rousseff became the first woman to serve as President of Brazil, during which she cultivated strong relations with China. Following her presidency, Rousseff was appointed as the head of the New Development Bank, where she has played a key role in promoting cooperation and exchanges between Brazil, China, and other BRICS nations. Her leadership in this role has been noted for its focus on strengthening ties within the BRICS framework.
Aleksandar Vučić		President of Serbia	25 May 2026	"President Vučić has long been dedicated to fostering China–Serbia friendship and advancing the development of bilateral relations, serving as an active contributor to and steadfast defender of the China–Serbia Comprehensive Strategic Partnership. On issues involving China's core interests and major concerns, President Vučić has consistently extended his firmest and most unequivocal support to China, thereby earning the respect of the Chinese people."

== See also ==
- Orders, decorations, and medals of China
