= Xue yuan =

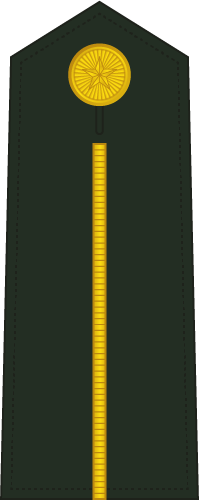
Dress Insignia for Xue Yuan

Xue yuan (simplified Chinese: 学员; traditional Chinese: 學員; pinyin: Xuéyuán, literally: learner or one who learns in English) is the equivalent of officer cadet of western, especially within the anglosphere, armed forces within the People's Liberation Army (PLA). The rank was established in 1988 as part of the revival of the use of rank by the People's Liberation Army. No equivalent rank existed in the pre-Cultural Revolution system of rank used by the PLA between 1955 and 1965 because of an effort to make all service members look uniform. All uniforms, from the common private all the way up to generals were the same.

== Usage ==
The PLA uses the term to refer to an officer as an undergraduate in a PLA academic institution or in one of the PLA's National Defense Student Programs. It can also be a student for any officers who have graduated and received technical training or education at a military institution. Similarly, the term xuebing (学兵, literally learning soldier) means any enlisted servicemember receiving specialty training at a training institution.

== Translation discrepancies ==
Due to faults in anglicizing and translating Chinese, xueyuan can also refer to 学院 (learning center, pinyin: xuéyuàn as opposed to 学员: xuéyuǎn). The PLA translates the Chinese term 学院 as either academy or college.

Civilian academic institutions may also translate xueyuan as school and institute; however, it is less common for terms like 学校 (school) or 大学 (college) to be used. The translation is not always consistent, even on the official website.

== See also ==
- PLA ranks
- PLA military academies
