= Medal of National Defense Service =

Medal of National Defense Service 国防服役纪念章
- Type: 5-rank Military medal
- Awarded for: Long service in the People's Liberation Army
- Country: China
- Presented by: Central Military Commission
- Eligibility: Military workers
- Status: Active
- Established: August 1, 2011

Precedence
- Next (higher): Meritorious Service Medal
- Next (lower): Medal of Guarding the Frontiers

The Medal of National Defense Service (Chinese: 国防服役纪念章) is a military decoration awarded by the Central Military Commission of China, first amended on May 4, 2010, then established on August 1, 2011. It was divided into three grades, but in 2022 it's re-divided into 5 grades.

== Criteria ==
=== 2011 criteria ===
The medal is awarded to military officers, civilian cadres and soldiers who have served for the People's Liberation Army for more than 10 years. Among them:

- A person who served more than 10 years and less than 20 years is awarded with a bronze medal,
- A person who served more than 20 years and less than 35 years is awarded with a silver medal,
- A person who served more than 35 years is awarded with a gold medal.

=== Service Ribbon ===
Golden

Silver

Bronze

=== 2022 criteria ===
In February 2022, the original 3-rank criteria were re-ranked with a new 5-rank criteria:

- A person who served for at least 50 years is awarded with a special level medal
- A person who served for at least 40 years and less than 50 years is awarded with a level 1 medal
- A person who served for at least 30 years and less than 40 years is awarded with a level 2 medal
- A person who served for at least 16 years and less than 30 years is awarded with a level 3 medal
- A person who served for at least 8 years and less than 16 years is awarded with a level 4 medal
