= Order of Heroic Exemplar =

Highest distinction of the People's Republic of China

- Simplified Chinese: 英雄模范勋章
Transcriptions
Standard Mandarin
- Hanyu Pinyin: Yīngxióng mófàn xūnzhāng
- IPA: [íŋɕjʊ̌ŋ mwǒfân ɕýnʈʂáŋ]

The Order of the Heroic Exemplar (Chinese: 英雄模范勋章) was the second highest military decoration, during 2011 and 2018, awarded by the Government of the People's Republic of China, only second to the Order of August First, and was named Heroic Exemplar Medal (Chinese: 英雄模范奖章) before 2011. The person who gained the award is called Heroic Exemplar (Chinese: 英模).

According to the 2018 amendment of PLA Disciplinary Order, the First Class Order of Heroic Exemplar is renamed back to Heroic Exemplar Medal (Chinese: 英模奖章), and the Second Class Order is abandoned.

== History ==
The Heroic Exemplar Medal, along with the Meritorious Service Medal, was first created in April 1951 by the Chinese People's Volunteer Army political director Du Ping in an effort to promote the unity of the Chinese armed forces during the Korean War. The medal was conceived so that the common soldiers would follow the examples set by a few selected role models. When the medal was first created, it was composed of three categories — second, first and special class. The special class was later eliminated when the Chinese People's Liberation Army's (PLA) medal system was formalized in 1988. In 2011, the name of the award changed into Order of Heroic Exemplar.

== Criteria and selection process ==
According to the initial award criteria published in 1951, the medal of the Order was awarded to those "who have owned two medals of third or second class or one of the first grade [Meritorious Service] award, who are most outstanding at an army or army corps level, (Note: In Chinese military nomenclature, the term "Army" (军) means Corps, while the term "Army Corps" (兵团) means Army.) and whose remarkable contribution are also recognized by friendly units."

A candidate for the order would normally be nominated by the deputy political officer of a company, while all squads within the company were required to meet once a month to list each soldier's accomplishments for the selection process. Once nominated, the Political Work Department of the Central Military Commission or the candidate's theater region political department would be responsible for approving the nomination to the order. Before 2018 the nomination process for a prospective inductee included what class of the order he or she will be appointed to.

== Investiture and regulations for wear ==
Once the nomination is approved, the recipient would be treated with a grand formal ceremony of investiture that is intended to educate the entire PLA or the recipient's military theater command, wherein he or she is formally invested with the medal of the Order. Besides the medal, the recipient also receives a ribbon bar and a certificate from the Political Work Department of the Central Military Commission. Until 2018 the certificate of honor indicated which class of the order in which he or she has been named to was to be stated. According to the 1988 regulation, the medal of the Order must be worn on the upper left side of the recipient's uniform. The regulation also decreed that the medal itself can only be worn during special meetings and celebrations, while the ribbon bars are allowed in daily functions.

== Recipient ==
=== First Class Order of Heroic Exemplar ===
From the renaming of the award in 2011, to the end of December 2016, a total of 14 people have received the First Class Medal of the Order of Heroic Exemplar, including 2 general officers, 7 field and junior grade officers, and 1 private. Of the 14 recipients, 4 of them are posthumously awarded.

No.	Name	Unit	Post and Rank when Decorated	Date	CMC Chairman	Notability	Note
1	Xu Jianping 徐建平	PLAAF	Former Deputy Minister of Equipment Department, XXth Aviation Division; Technical Professional Senior Colonel	Dec. 2011	Hu Jintao	Model Aircraft Crew Officer 模范机务干部	Posthumously Awarded
2	He Min 何敏	Lanzhou Military Region	Director of Department of Gynecology & Obstetrics, 4th Hospital of PLA; Non-rank Cadres	Dec. 2011	Hu Jintao	Model Surgeon of Plateau Areas 高原模范军医	Non-rank Cadres
3	Yan Gaohong 严高鸿	GPD	Former Chief Editor of Research Department Journal, Nanjing Political College, Professor; Non-rank Cadres	May 2012	Hu Jintao	Model Theorist 模范理论工作者	Non-rank Cadres, Posthumously Awarded
4	Liu Wang 刘旺	GAD	Astronaut; Senior Colonel	Oct. 2012	Hu Jintao	Heroic Astronaut 英雄航天员	Shenzhou 9
5	Liu Yang 刘洋	GAD	Astronaut; Major	Oct. 2012	Hu Jintao	Heroic Astronaut 英雄航天员	Shenzhou 9
6	Lin Junde 林俊德	GAD	Former Researcher, Xinjiang Malan Nuclear Test Base; Technical Professional Major General	Jan. 2013	Xi Jinping	Distinguished Scientist; Devoted to the cause of National Defense Technology 献身国防科技事业杰出科学家	Posthumously Awarded
7	Zhang Xiaoguang 张晓光	GAD	Astronaut; Senior Colonel	Jul. 2013	Xi Jinping	Heroic Astronaut 英雄航天员	Shenzhou 10
8	Wang Yaping 王亚平	GAD	Astronaut; Major	Jul. 2013	Xi Jinping	Heroic Astronaut 英雄航天员	Shenzhou 10
9	Jia Yuanyou 贾元友	Beijing Military Region	Squad Leader of 3rd Platoon, 6th Tk Co, XXth Mechanised Infantry Regiment, 38th Group Army; Chief Sergeant Class 4	Aug. 2013	Xi Jinping	Armored Elite 铁甲精兵	
10	Li Suzhi 李素芝	Chengdu Military Region	Administrator of General Hospital of Tibet Military Area Command; Technical Professional Major General	Aug. 2013	Xi Jinping	Great Surgeon of Snow-covered Plateau 雪域高原好军医	
11	Dai Mingmeng 戴明盟	PLAN	Deputy Commander of XXth Naval Aviation Troop; Senior Captain	Aug. 2013	Xi Jinping	Heroic Test Pilot of Aircraft Carrier Fighter 航母战斗机英雄试飞员	Shenyang J-15 test pilot
12	Tan Qingquan 谭清泉	SAC	Senior Engineer of 42nd Unit, Troop 96315; Senior Colonel	Aug. 2013	Xi Jinping	Sword Honing Pioneer 砺剑先锋	
13	Zhang Chao 张超	PLAN	Pilot of XXth Naval Aviation Troop; Lieutenant Commander	Nov. 2016	Xi Jinping	Pioneer Chasing Dreams in Sea and Sky for Strengthening the Military 逐梦海天的强军先锋	Posthumously Awarded; J-15 test pilot
14	Chen Dong 陈冬	EDD	Astronaut; Colonel	Dec. 2016	Xi Jinping	Heroic Astronaut 英雄航天员	Shenzhou 11

=== Second Class Order of Heroic Exemplar ===
Not all individuals who received the Second Class Order of Heroic Exemplar were reported in the public media.
