= Wang Yu (general) =

Chinese politician

- 汪玉
- Born: January 1964 (age 62); Zhijiang, Hubei
- Spouse: Xu Ni
- Military career
- Allegiance: People's Republic of China
- Branch: People's Liberation Army Navy
- Service years: 1987–present
- Rank: Rear Admiral
- Unit: South Sea Fleet
- Commands: Head of the Equipment Department of South Sea Fleet (December 2014 – September 2015)

Wang Yu (Chinese: 汪玉; pinyin: Wāng Yù; born January 1964) is a Rear Admiral in the People's Liberation Army Navy of China. He is a member of the Chinese Communist Party. As of September 2015 he was under investigation by the military authorities. Previously he served as head of the Equipment Department of South Sea Fleet.

== Biography ==
Wang was born in January 1964 in Zhijiang, Hubei. After graduating from Yiling High School, he entered Shanghai Jiao Tong University, where he majored in mechanical and power engineering. In December 1987, he enlisted in the People's Liberation Army and was assigned to the Navy Equipment Research Institute. He was elevated to deputy chief engineer in 1994, four years later, he was promoted again to become chief engineer. On July 20, 2007, he promoted to Rear Admiral. He was president of the Navy Equipment Research Institute before serving as Head of the Equipment Department of South Sea Fleet.

In September 2015, he was put under investigation for alleged "serious violations of discipline". Then he was removed from membership of China's national legislature, the National People's Congress.

Wang is a former delegate to the 10th, 11th and 12th National People's Congress.

== Personal life ==
Wang Yu married Xu Ni (徐霓), a medical doctor who had studied in Germany.

Military offices
| Previous: Zhao Yongfu (赵永甫) | President of the PLA Naval Academy of Armament; 2011–2016 | Next: Li Pengcheng (李鹏程) |
| Previous: Jiang Zhonghua (姜中华) | Head of the Equipment Department of South Sea Fleet; December 2014 – September 2015 | Next: Ju Xinchun (鞠新春) |
