= Medal of Peace Mission =

Medal of Peace Mission 和平使命纪念章
- Type: Military medal
- Awarded for: Serving in international military activities
- Country: China
- Presented by: Central Military Commission
- Eligibility: Military workers who co-operated internationally
- Status: Active

Precedence
- Next (higher): Medal of Devotion for National Defense
- Next (lower): Medal of Performing Combat/Vital Mission

The Medal of Peace Mission (Chinese: 和平使命纪念章) is a military decoration awarded by the Central Military Commission of China.

== Criteria ==
The medal is awarded to military officers, civilian cadres and soldiers who have served in international military activities, such as the United Nations peacekeeping operations, national anti-terrorism/military drills, foreign aid activities, etc.

=== Service Ribbon ===
Peace Mission
