= August 1 Medal =

Military order in the People's Republic of China

August 1 Medal 八一勋章
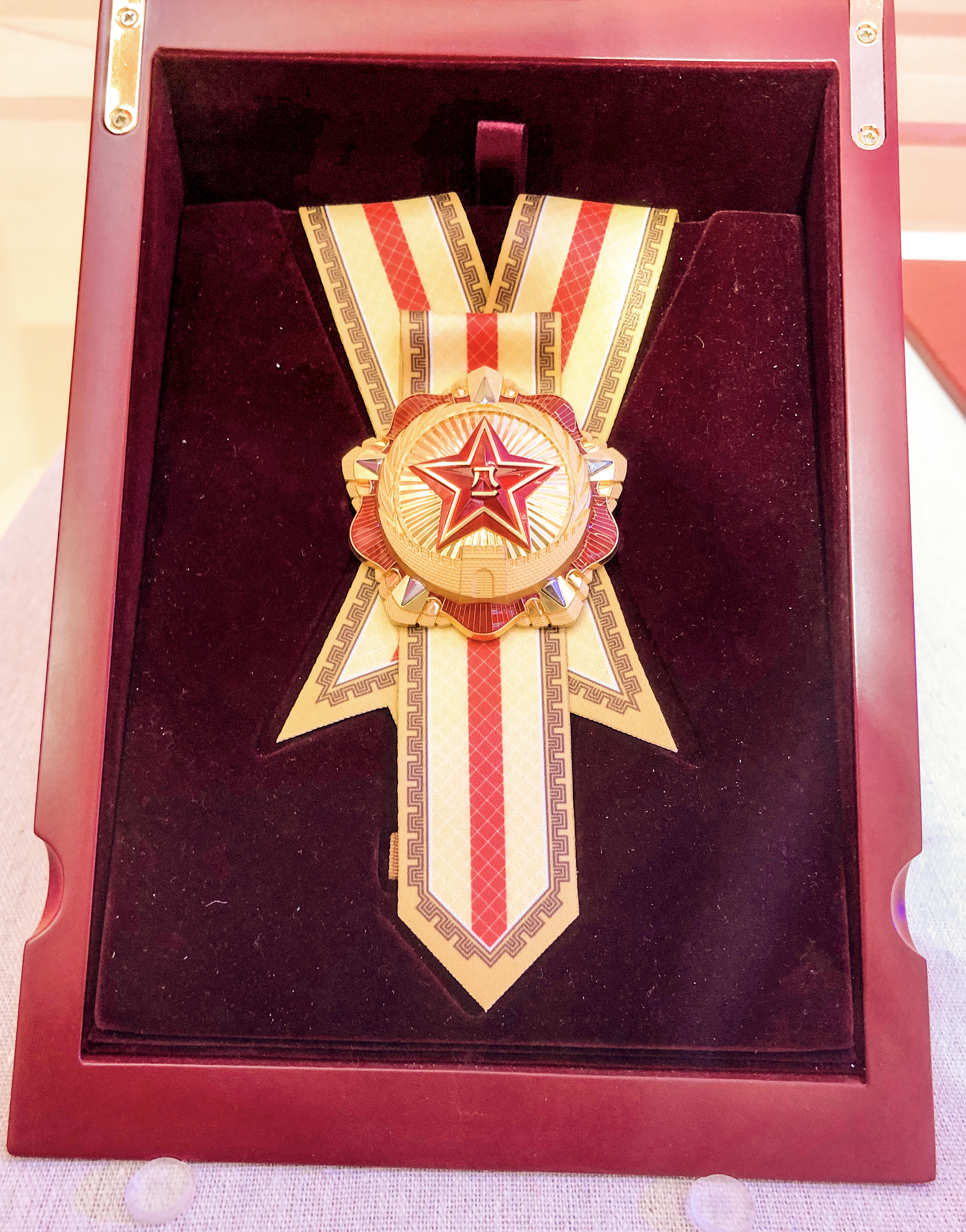
- August 1 Medal
- Type: Military awards and decorations
- Awarded for: "Military personnel who have meritorious service in upholding sovereignty, security and development interests of the state, and promoting the modernization of national defense and the armed forces"
- Country: China
- Eligibility: Military personnel of China
- Status: Active
- Established: 12 June 2017
- First award: 28 July 2017
- Final award: 27 July 2022

Highlights
- Total recipients: 13
- Ribbon of the Medal

Precedence
- Next (higher): Medal of the Republic
- Equivalent: July 1 Medal
- Next (lower): Order of Heroic Exemplar

August 1 Medal
- Traditional Chinese: 八一勳章
- Simplified Chinese: 八一勋章
Transcriptions
Standard Mandarin
- Hanyu Pinyin: Bāyī Xūnzhāng

The August 1 Medal is the highest honorary medal bestowed on military personnel by the People's Republic of China. The bestowal is decided by the Central Military Commission and presented by the Chairman of the Central Military Commission. According to law, this medal is awarded to "military personnel who have made great contributions and established outstanding meritorious service in safeguarding national sovereignty, security, and development interests, and promoting the modernization of national defense and the military, and have had a profound impact on the country and the entire military." It is awarded every five years.

== History ==
The August 1 Medal was originally established in 1955 as the highest military award for members of the PLA who served during the Second Sino-Japanese War and Chinese Civil War. The award was discontinued in 1957. On 12 June 2017, with the approval of Xi Jinping, Chairman of the Central Military Commission, the Order of August the First was re-established.

== Recipients ==
=== 2017 ===
On 28 July 2017, Xi Jinping awarded the decoration to ten recipients:

- Mai Xiande
- Ma Weiming
- Li Zhonghua
- Wang Zhongxin
- Jing Haipeng
- Cheng Kaijia
- Wei Changjin
- Wang Gang
- Leng Pengfei
- Yin Chunrong

=== 2022 ===
On 27 July 2022, Xi Jinping signs order to confer Medal on three military individuals:

- Du Fuguo (杜富国), sergeant in the PLA Southern Theater Command
- Qian Qihu (钱七虎), retired researcher at the former PLA University of Science and Technology
- Nie Haisheng (聂海胜), renowned astronaut from the PLA Astronaut Division
