= Medal of Performing Combat/Vital Mission =

Medal of Performing Combat/Vital Mission 执行作战和重大任务纪念章
- Type: Military Medal
- Awarded for: Performing in combat/vital missions
- Presented by: Central Military Commission
- Eligibility: Military Workers
- Status: Active

Precedence
- Next (higher): Medal of Peace Mission

The Medal of Performing Combat/Vital Mission (Chinese: 执行作战和重大任务纪念章) is a military decoration awarded by the Central Military Commission of China. It has two types: the Medal of Performing Combat Mission and the Medal of Performing Vital Mission.

== Criteria ==
The medal is awarded to military officers, civilian cadres and soldiers who have performed missions such as combat, disaster relief, counter-terrorism operations and maintaining stability, responding to emergencies, etc.

=== Service Ribbon ===
Performing Vital Mission

Performing Combat Mission
