= Jianghan University =

University in Wuhan, China

- 江汉大学; Jiānghàn dàxúe
- Established: 1978
- Location: Wuhan, Hubei, China
- Website: https://www.jhun.edu.cn/ https://eng.jhun.edu.cn/

Jianghan University (Chinese: 江汉大学; pinyin: Jiānghàn dàxúe) is a provincial public university in Wuhan, Hubei, China. Its campus is 1.4 km^{2}, with an additional 0.5 km^{2} under construction. It lies in the Wuhan Economy and Technology Development Zone by the Lake Sanjiao.

There are ten disciplines in the university: economics, law, education, literature, history, agriculture, science, engineering, medicine, fine arts, design and management. The university offers 42 undergraduate programs. There are about 1,000 full-time teachers, of whom 103 are full professors and about 400 associate professors. The number of full-time students is 15,600.

== History ==
Jianghan University was created as a technical college by the city government of Wuhan in 1981. It started a four-year undergraduate program in 1990s.

Jianghan University was accredited in October 2001 as a comprehensive university by the Ministry of Education of the People's Republic of China. It was established on the basis of the amalgamation of Jianghan University, Huazhong University of Science and Technology (Hankou branch), Wuhan Institute of Education, and Wuhan Workers Medical College. It later moved to the current campus.
