= Medal of Guarding the Frontiers =

Medal of Guarding the Frontiers 卫国戍边纪念章
- Type: 3-rank military medal
- Awarded for: Long service in Remote/Border and Hardship Areas (RBH Areas)
- Presented by: Central Military Commission
- Eligibility: Military Workers
- Status: Active
- Established: August 1st, 2011

Precedence
- Next (higher): Medal of National Defense Service
- Next (lower): Medal of Devotion for National Defense

The Medal of Guarding the Frontiers (Chinese: 卫国戍边纪念章) is a military decoration awarded by the Central Military Commission of China, first amended on May 4, 2010, then established on August 1, 2011. It is divided into three grades.

== Criteria ==
The medal is awarded to military officers, civilian cadres and soldiers who serving in remote/border and hardship areas (RBH Areas). Among them:

- A person who served 1 to 2 years in level-1 or level-2 RBH areas, or 2 to 4 years in level-3 RBH areas, or 3 to 6 years in level-4 RBH areas, or 4 to 8 years in level-5 RBH areas, or 5 to 10 years in level-6 RBH areas is awarded with a bronze medal,
- A person who served more than 2 times the service length in the corresponding area is awarded with a silver medal,
- A person who served more than 3 times the service length in the corresponding area is awarded with a gold medal.

=== Service Ribbon ===
Golden

Silver

Bronze
