= PLA Naval University of Engineering =

Military university in Wuhan, China

- 中国人民解放军海军工程大学
- Motto: 严谨、求实、拼搏、创新
- Motto in English: Rigorous, Realistic, Hard work, Innovation
- Type: National PLA
- Established: November 22, 1949
- Affiliations: People's Liberation Army Navy
- President: Han Xiaohu (韩小虎)
- Political commissar: Gao Xuemin (高学敏)
- Location: Wuhan, Hubei, China
- Campus: 3200 mu

PLA Naval University of Engineering (simplified Chinese: 中国人民解放军海军工程大学; traditional Chinese: 中國人民解放軍海軍工程大學; pinyin: Zhōngguó Rénmín Jiěfàngjūn Haǐjūn Gōngchéng Dàxué; abbreviated NUEPLA and colloquially known by the Chinese as Haǐgōngdà 海工大) is a national key university administered by the People's Liberation Army Navy. PLA Naval University of Engineering is located in Wuhan, Hubei, China.

As of fall 2015, the university has 2 campuses, consists of 5 colleges and 7 departments, with 20 specialties for undergraduates.

== History ==
PLA Naval University of Engineering was founded in May 1949, it was initially called "Andong Naval Academy". It was renamed "Dalian Naval Academy" in November 1949 and "PLA Second Naval Academy" in December 1950. In 1975, PLA Second Naval Academy was changed to PLA Naval Academy of Engineering. In 1999, PLA Naval Academy of Engineering and PLA Naval Academy of Electronic Engineering merged to form the PLA Naval University of Engineering. In 2004, PLA Naval Logistics Academy merged into the university.

== Schools and Departments ==
- College of Science
- College of Power Engineering
- College of Electronic Engineering
- College of Electrical Engineering
- College of Service
- Department of Weapon System Engineering
- Department of Marine Engineering
- Department of Nuclear Science and Engineering
- Department of Information Security
- Department of Management Engineering
- Department of Equipment Economics & Management
- Department of Training

== Culture ==
- Motto: 严谨、求实、拼搏、创新
- Official journal: Journal of Naval University of Engineering (《海军工程大学学报》), founded in 1977.

== Library ==
The PLA Naval University of Engineering Library has a collection of over 0.6 million volumes.

== Notable alumni ==
- He You (Chinese: 何友), an academician of the Chinese Academy of Engineering.
- Liang Yang (Chinese: 梁阳), captain of Changzhou Warship.
- Lou Fuqiang (Chinese: 楼富强), engineer commander of the Chinese aircraft carrier Liaoning.
- Ma Weiming (Chinese: 马伟明), an academician of the Chinese Academy of Engineering.
- Wang Wencai (Chinese: 王文才), president of Tianjin Campuses, PLA Naval University of Engineering.
- Li Juelong (Chinese: 李决龙), a professor at PLA University of Science and Technology and PLA Naval University of Engineering.

== Friendly Schools ==
- Tsinghua University
- Huazhong University of Science and Technology
