= Ranks of the People's Liberation Army Ground Force =

The People's Liberation Army (PLA) has not always used ranks or insignia. In common with the practice of the Red Army at the time of its founding in 1927, neither were used until 1955 when a system of ranks was established. As a result of the Cultural Revolution, ranks were abolished in May 1965 (this led to a similar reform in Albania in the midst of the Albanian Cultural and Ideological Revolution). After the Sino-Vietnamese War of 1979, reforms in the PLA began to be made to professionalize the armed forces once more. The 1984 Military Service Law provided for the resumption of rank, but disagreements on what ranks were to be used and who would receive them caused the revival of rank to be delayed until 1988. The following ranks and their respective insignia shown are those used by the People's Liberation Army Ground Force.

== Current ranking system ==
=== PLAGF officers ===
The current system of officer ranks and insignia, a revision of the ranks and insignia established in 1955, began usage in 1988. The 1955 to 1965 marshal officer ranks of yuánshuài (5-star Marshal) and dà yuánshuài (6-star grand marshal) were not revived. The general officer ranks (jiang) were revised by the addition of semi-circular wreath at the bottom of the insignia and by a change in the name of the highest general officer rank from da jiang (4-star General) to yi ji shang jiang (4-star first class colonel general). This highest rank in the new system was never held and was abolished in 1994. The field officer (Xiao) and company officer (Wei) ranks were the same in title and insignia except that highest company-level officer rank of Da Wei in the 1955 to 1965 system was not included in the revived ranks. The final difference between the two systems is that in 1955 to 1965 there existed a warrant officer rank, Zhun Wei, which was not incorporated in the revived rank system, while new system had a rank for officer cadets, Xue Yuan. Despite being the rank below Shao Wei in both systems, the insignia have no similarities.

Officer rank names are usually not translated literally, but rather to a corresponding rank system. This can lead to different translations being used depending on the system chosen for the correspondences. The 1955–1965 system, with its greater number of officer ranks, is usually translated using the Soviet rank system of that era, while the modern officer ranks are usually given a NATO rank correspondence. For example, the non-literal translation used for the rank of Shang Jiang (literally "senior general") depends on whether one is comparing it to Soviet or Russian ranks (colonel general) or to British or U.S. ranks (general).

Title	上将 Shang jiang	中将 Zhong jiang	少将 Shao jiang	大校 Da xiao	上校 Shang xiao	中校 Zhong xiao	少校 Shao xiao	上尉 Shang wei	中尉 Zhong wei	少尉 Shao wei	学员 Xue yuan
Equivalent translation	General	Lieutenant general	Major general	Senior colonel	Colonel	Lieutenant colonel	Major	Captain	First lieutenant	Second lieutenant	Officer cadet
Shoulder insignia											
Collar insignia											

=== PLAGF other ranks personnel ===
The current system of other ranks and insignia dates from 2022.

New recruits of the People's Liberation Army have no military ranks before the boot camp is completed, and they will be awarded the rank of Private/Seaman Apprentice/Airman (All collectively called "Private" or "Lie Bing" in the Chinese language) after they have graduated from the boot camp. According to Article 16 of Chapter 3 of the "Regulations on the Service of Active Soldiers of the Chinese People's Liberation Army" (Chinese: 中国人民解放军现役士兵服役条例), "The lowest enlisted rank is Private".

On February 27, 2022, the National People's Congress approved a new regulation which changes the previous Master sergeant fourth class(Chinese: 四级军士长) to Staff sergeant first class(Chinese: 一级上士).

Rank group	高级军士 Gāo jí jūn shì			中级军士 Zhōng jí jūn shì		初级军士 Chū jí jūn shì		义务兵 Yì wù bīng	
Title	一级军士长 Yī jí jūn shì zhǎng	二级军士长 Er jí jūn shì zhǎng	三级军士长 Sān jí jūn shì zhǎng	一级上士 Yī jí shàng shì	二级上士 Er jí shàng shì	中士 Zhōng shì	下士 Xià shì	上等兵 Shàng děng bīng	列兵 Liè bīng
Equivalent translation	Master Sergeant First Class	Master Sergeant Second Class	Master Sergeant Third Class	Staff Sergeant First Class	Staff Sergeant Second Class	Sergeant	Corporal	Private First Class	Private
Shoulder insignia									
Collar insignia									

=== Other military branches ===
The ranks of the People's Liberation Army Air Force generally has the same names, position and ranks as the People's Liberation Army Ground Force, and their insignia correspond except Air Force ranks are on a light blue background instead of green.

Ranks of the People's Liberation Army Navy also have corresponding insignia with a black background, but are only worn with the dress white uniforms, as only sleeve insignia are used in the dress blue uniform for officers, with other ranks retaining the shoulder board insignia.

== Historic ranks ==
=== 1955–65 rank system ===
The PLA adopted ranks in 1955. The insignia used by officers from 1955 to 1965 by the PLA Ground Force were modelled on those used by the Soviet Army at the time and similar to the earlier Imperial Japanese Army on collar insignia, with the primary differences being the existence of an additional field officer rank, and the insignia of the highest general officer rank being four stars unlike the one large star used by the Soviet Armed Forces starting in 1963. The NCO insignia of that period showed Japanese influence with the use of stars on the collars with the specialty badge on the side. While general duties officers wore the shoulder board pattern shown below (gold and red), technical service officers sported white and red shoulder boards with their rank insignia. Ranks were abolished during the Cultural Revolution.

=== Timeline of change ===
Officer ranks

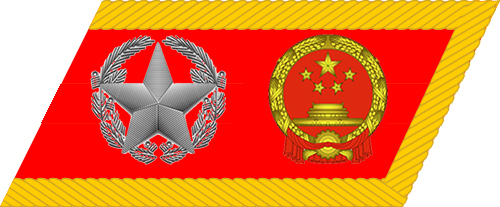
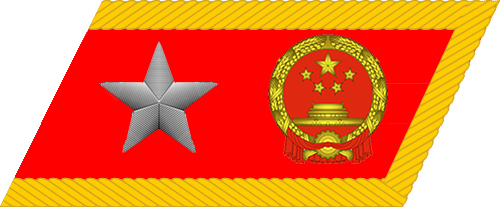
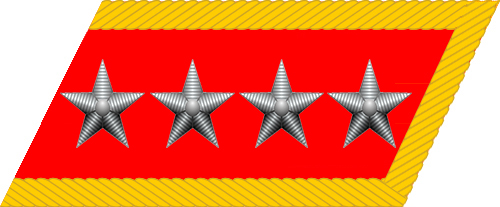
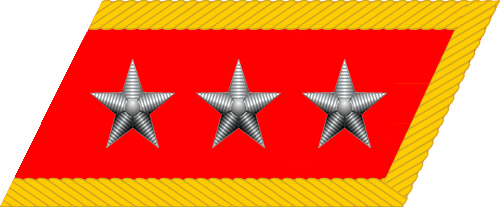
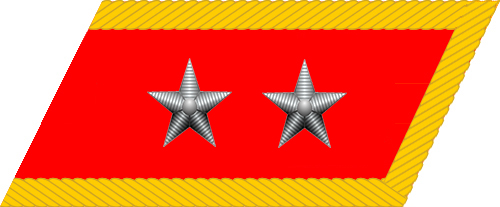
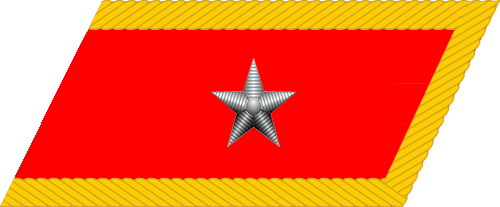
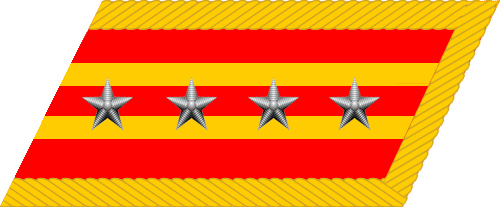
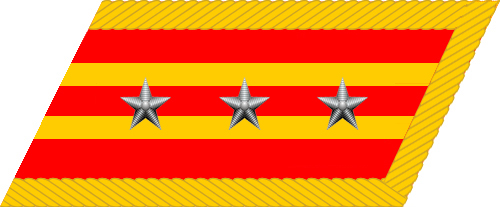
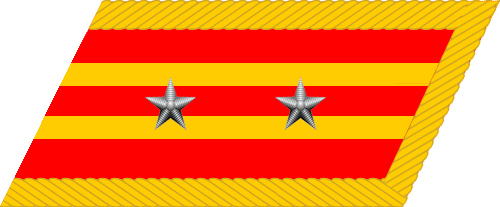
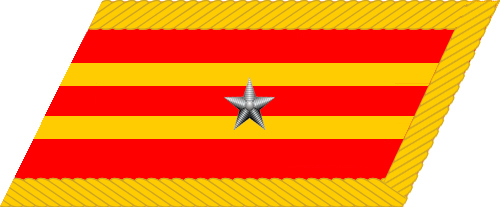
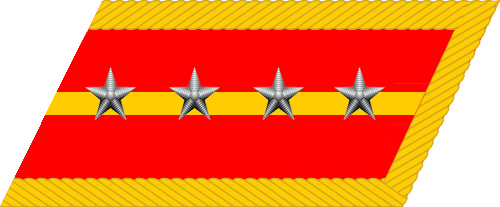
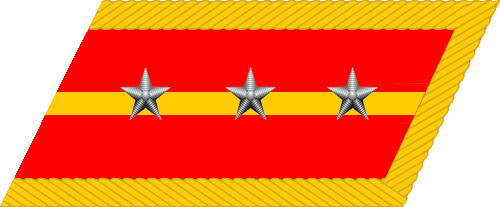
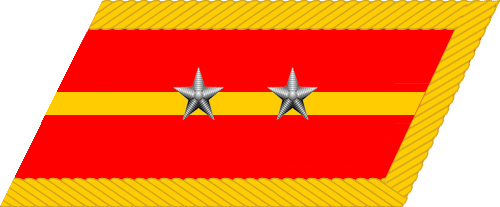
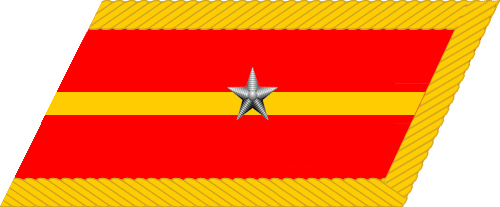
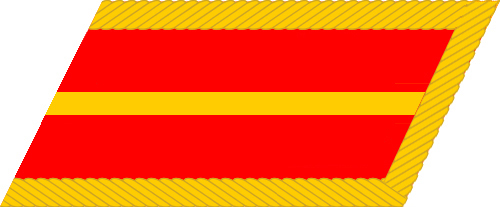
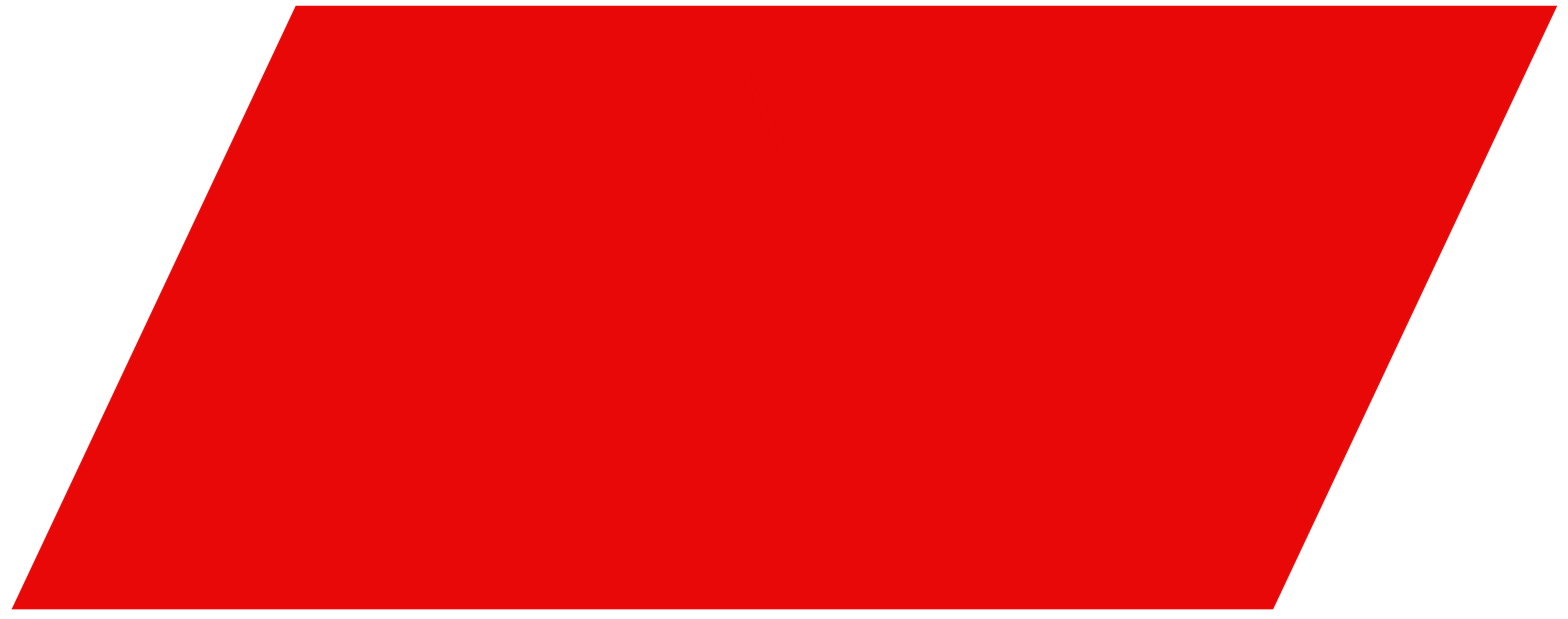
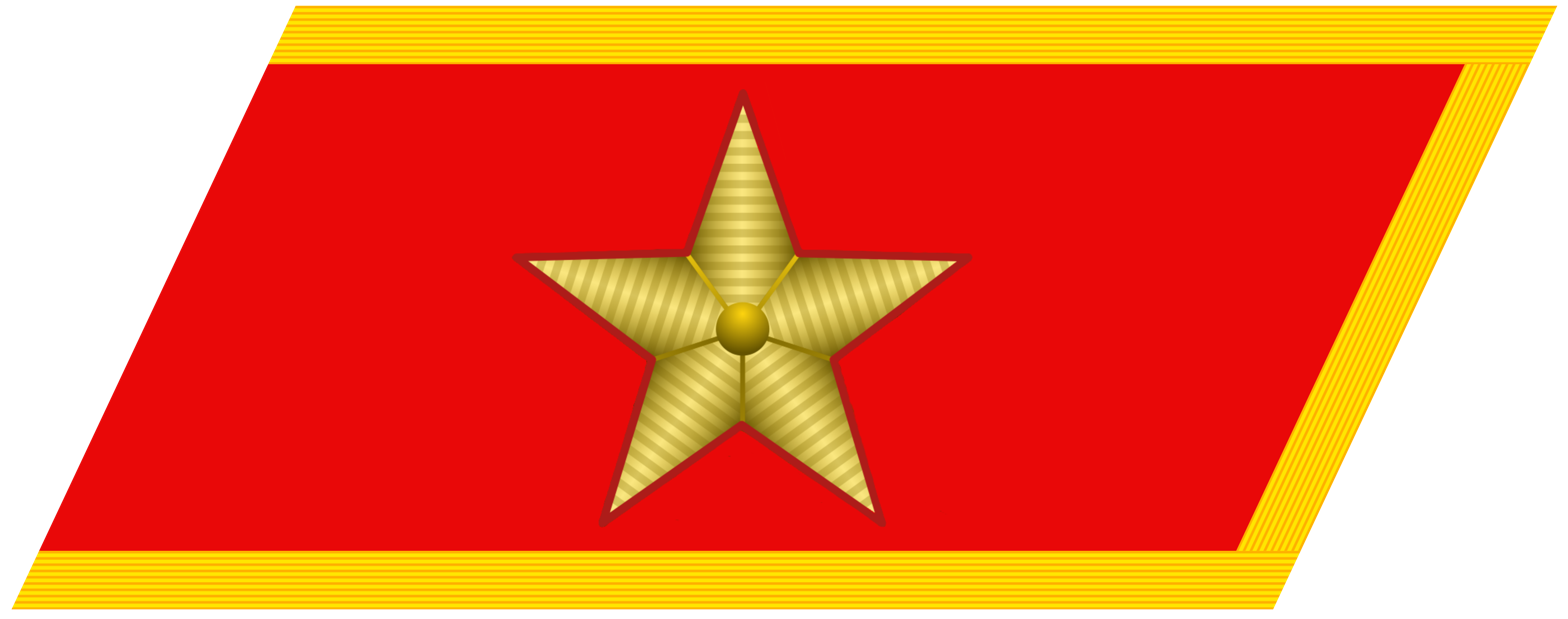
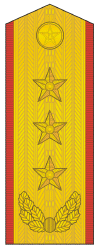
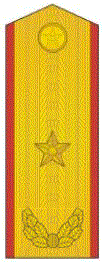
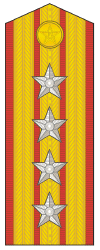
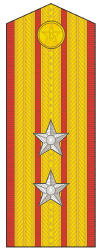
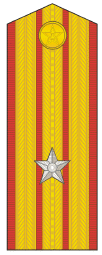
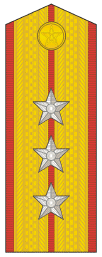
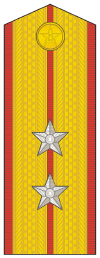
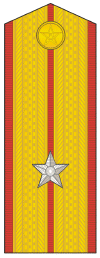
Rank group	General / flag officers						Senior officers				Junior officers
PLA Ground Force (1955–1965)
PLA Ground Force (1955–1965)	大元帥; Da yuan shuai	元帥; Yuan shuai	大将; Dà jiàng	上将; Shàngjiàng	中将; Zhōngjiàng	少将; Shàojiàng	大校; Dàxiào	上校; Shàngxiào	中校; Zhōngxiào	少校; Shàoxiào	大尉; Dàwèi	上尉; Shàngwèi	中尉; Zhōngwèi	少尉; Shàowèi	准尉; Zhǔnwèi
No ranks (1965–1985)
No ranks (1985–1988)
PLA Ground Force (1988–1994)
PLA Ground Force (1988–1994)			一级上将; Yī jí shàng jiàng	上将; Shàngjiàng	中将; Zhōngjiàng	少将; Shàojiàng	大校; Dàxiào	上校; Shàngxiào	中校; Zhōngxiào	少校; Shàoxiào	上尉; Shàngwèi		中尉; Zhōngwèi	少尉; Shàowèi	准尉; Zhǔnwèi

Other ranks

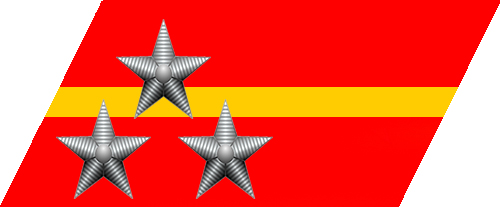
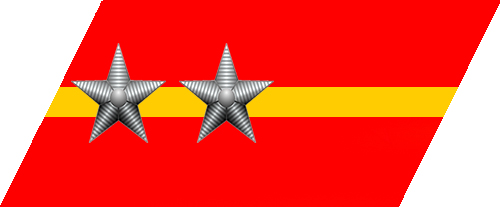
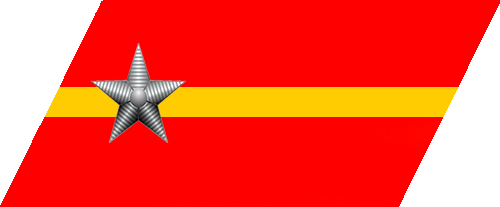
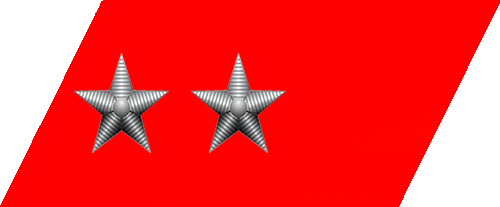
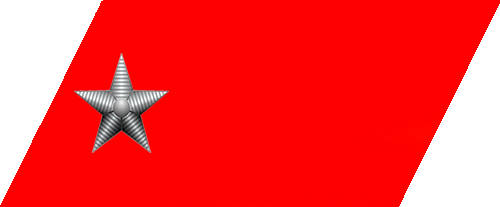
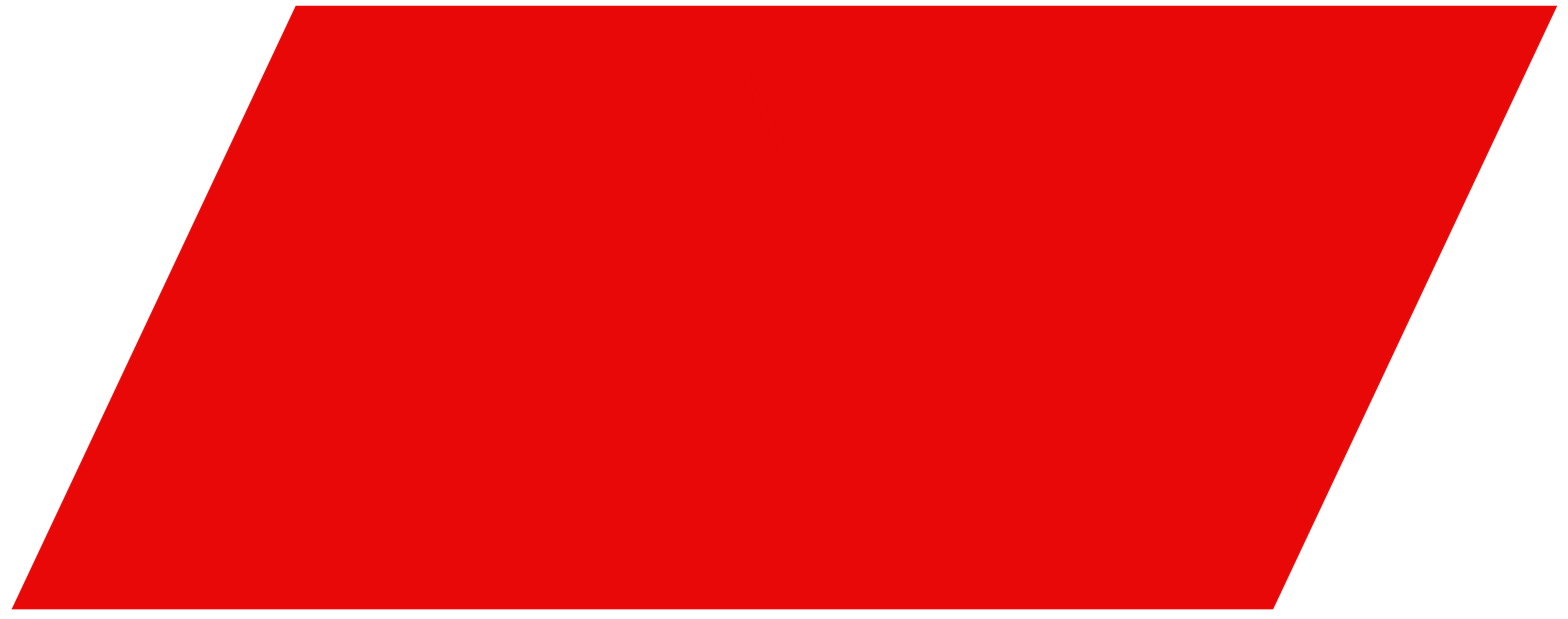
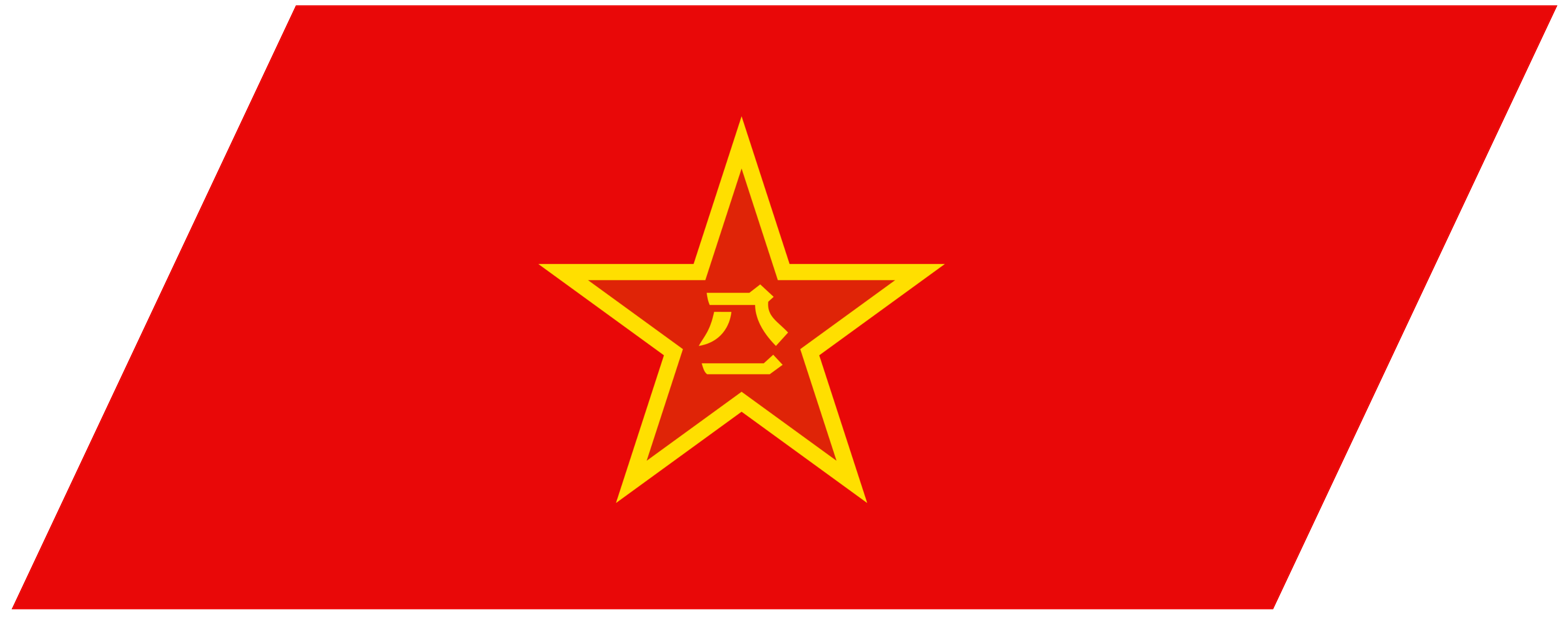
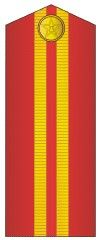
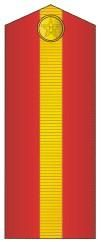
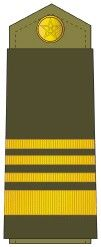
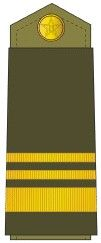
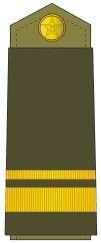
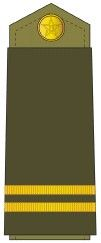
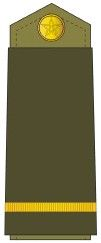
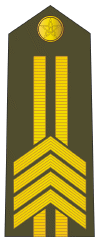
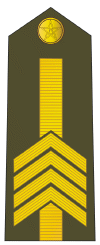
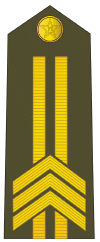
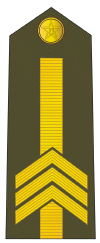
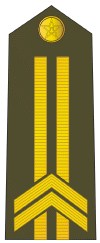
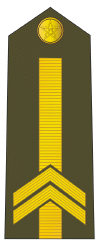
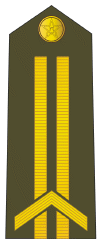
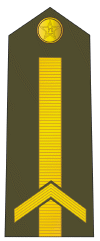
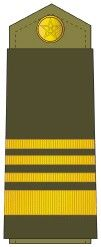
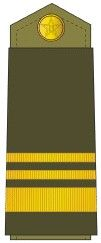
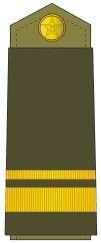
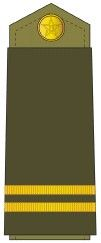
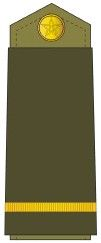
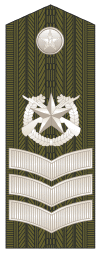
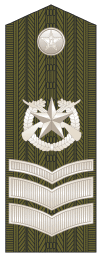
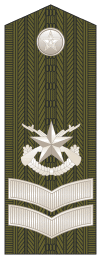
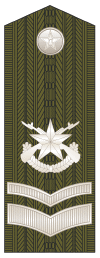
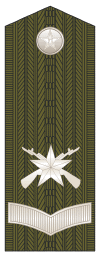
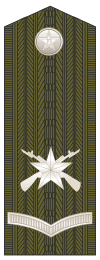
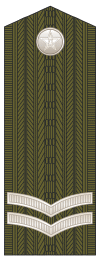
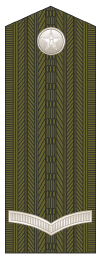
Rank group	Senior NCOs										Junior NCOs	Enlisted
PLA Ground Force (1955–1965)
PLA Ground Force (1955–1965)									上士; Shàng shì	中士; Zhōng shì	下士; Xià shì	上等兵; Shàngděngbīng	列兵; Lièbīng
No ranks (1965–1985)
No ranks (1985–1988)
PLA Ground Force (1988–1994)
PLA Ground Force (1988–1994)					军士长; Jūn shì zhǎng		专业军士; Zhuān yè jūn shì		上士; Shàng shì	中士; Zhōng shì	下士; Xià shì	上等兵; Shàngděngbīng	列兵; Lièbīng
PLA Ground Force (1995–1999)
PLA Ground Force (1995–1999)	四级军士长; Sì jí jūn shì zhǎng	四级专业军士; Sì jí zhuān yè jūn shì	三级军士长; Sān jí jūn shì zhǎng	三级专业军士; Sān jí zhuān yè jūn shì	二级军士长; Èr jí jūn shì zhǎng	二级专业军士; Èr jí zhuān yè jūn shì	一级军士长; Yī jí jūn shì zhǎng	一级专业军士; Yī jí zhuān yè jūn shì	上士; Shàng shì	中士; Zhōng shì	下士; Xià shì	上等兵; Shàngděngbīng	列兵; Lièbīng
PLA Ground Force (2000–2007)
PLA Ground Force (2000–2007)	六级士官; Liu ji shi guan				五级士官; Wu ji shi guan		四级士官; Si ji shi guan		三级士官; San ji shi guan	二级士官; Er ji shi guan	一级士官; Yi ji shi guan	上等兵; Shàngděngbīng	列兵; Lièbīng

== See also ==
- Grades of the armed forces of China
- People's Liberation Army rank insignia
- Republic of China Army rank insignia
