= Medal of Devotion for National Defense =

Chinese military decoration

Medal of Devotion for National Defense 献身国防纪念章
- Type: Military Medal
- Awarded for: Martyrdom, death or injury in the line of duty
- Presented by: Central Military Commission
- Eligibility: Martyrs, Killed/Injured Military Workers (in respective order)
- Status: Active
- Established: August 1st, 2011

Precedence
- Next (higher): Medal of Guarding the Frontiers
- Next (lower): Medal of Peace Mission

The Medal of Devotion for National Defense (Chinese: 献身国防纪念章) is a military decoration awarded by the Central Military Commission of China, first amended on May 4, 2010, then established on August 1, 2011. It is divided into three levels.

== Criteria ==
The medal is awarded to military officers, civilian employees and staff, and soldiers, posthumously to martyrs and those killed in the line of duty, and awarded to those disabled by injuries received in the line of duty.

- Martyrs are awarded posthumous golden medals
- A person who dies in the line of duty is awarded a posthumous silver medal
- A person who is disabled by injuries received in the line of duty is awarded a bronze medal

=== Service ribbon ===
Golden

Silver

Bronze
