= Meritorious Service Medal (China) =

The Meritorious Service Medal (Chinese: 立功奖章; pinyin: Lì Gōng Jiǎngzhāng) is the third highest military decoration awarded by the Chinese government.

== History ==
The Meritorious Service Medal, along with the Hero's Medal, was first created in April 1951 by the Chinese People's Volunteer Army political director Du Ping in an effort to promote the unity of the Chinese armed forces during the Korean War. The medals were conceived so that the common soldiers would follow the examples set by few selected role models. When the medal was first created, it was composed of four categories — third, second, first and special class. The special class was later eliminated when the Chinese People's Liberation Army's (PLA) medal system formalized in 1988.

== Criteria and selection process ==
According to the initial award criteria published in 1951, the medal can be awarded for any combat and noncombat achievements, as long as qualities such as "bravery in and skills in battle, acting in friendly unified, alert, earnest, lively way and [of] willing to help others in noncombat situations" were demonstrated.

Specific achievement that were required for the awards were also outlined in the criteria. For combat situations, the achievements would be "those who destroy enemy obstacles, one bunker, one tank, or supply storage with explosive packages or grenade, or bringing down one enemy plane with anti-aircraft gun; those who are good at annihilating the enemy forces with light infantry weapons at no or small cost; those who sneak into enemy positions and capture an enemy officer, or a scout or guard; and those who do not leave the front line on account of minor wounds or are always in the van to advance and in the rear to evacuate." For noncombat situations, the achievements would be those who "play a role in helping others to overcome difficulties such as caring about the wounded and the new recruits, [sic] are active in thinking to improve combat tactics and techniques...and have excellent outcomes in training or mutual learning activities, [sic] strictly observe disciplines, always respect local people and authorities, take good care of weapons and equipments, and good at criticism and self-criticism."

A candidate for the medal would normally be nominated by the deputy political officer of a company, while all squads within the company were required to meet once a month to list each soldier's accomplishments for the selection process. Once nominated, the political department of the candidate's brigade or corps/group army would be responsible for approving the nomination.

== Reward and regulation ==
Once the nomination is approved, the recipient would be treated with an official awarding ceremony that is intended to educate the unit that approved the nomination. Besides the medal, the recipient also receives a ribbon bar and a certificate with the citations from the Political Work Department of the Central Military Commission. According to the 1988 regulation, the medal must be worn on the upper left side of the recipient's uniform. The regulation also decreed that the medal itself can only be worn during special meetings and celebrations, while the ribbon bars are allowed in daily functions.

== Ribbons ==
1st Class	2nd Class	3rd Class
