= Ma Zhanmin =

Chinese politician (1932–2024)

- 马占民

Commander of the Beijing Military Region Air Force
- In office April 1994 – January 1996
- Political Commissar: Zhao Lirong
- Preceded by: Lin Jigui
- Succeeded by: Qiao Qingchen

Commander of the Lanzhou Military Region Air Force
- In office January 1993 – April 1994
- Political Commissar: Zheng Baosen; Zang Sui
- Preceded by: Sun Jinghua
- Succeeded by: Liu Shunyao

Chief of Staff of the People's Liberation Army Air Force
- In office November 1982 – January 1987
- Political Commissar: Zhang Tingfa; Wang Hai
- Preceded by: Wang Dinglie
- Succeeded by: Yu Zemin

Personal details
- Born: 22 July 1932 Shen County, Hebei, China
- Died: 19 April 2024 (aged 91) Beijing, China
- Party: Chinese Communist Party
- Education: 6th Flight School of the People's Liberation Army Air Force

Military service
- Allegiance: People's Republic of China
- Branch/service: People's Liberation Army Air Force
- Years of service: 1947–2003
- Rank: Lieutenant general
- Battles/wars: Chinese Civil War; Korean War

Chinese name
- Simplified Chinese: 马占民
- Traditional Chinese: 馬佔民
Transcriptions
Standard Mandarin
- Hanyu Pinyin: Mǎ Zhànmín

Ma Zhanmin (Chinese: 马占民; 22 July 1932 – 19 April 2024) was a lieutenant general in the People's Liberation Army Air Force of China. He was a delegate to the 6th and 7th National People's Congress. He was a member of the 9th National Committee of the Chinese People's Political Consultative Conference.

== Biography ==
Ma was born in Shen County (now Shenzhou City), Hebei, in July 1932. He enlisted in the People's Liberation Army (PLA) in July 1947, and joined the Chinese Communist Party (CCP) in October 1948.

During the Chinese Civil War, he served in the war and engaged in the Battle of Qingfengdian, Battle of Shijiazhuang, Battle of Jinan.

After establishment of the Communist State, in April 1950, he enrolled at the 6th Flight School of the People's Liberation Army Air Force, becoming one of the first batch of flight trainees of the People's Liberation Army Air Force since its establishment on 11 November 1949. After graduating in February 1951, he took part in the Korean War.

In June 1973, he was selected from the 50 aviation division commanders of the PLA Air Force and appointed director of the PLA Air Force Operations Department and PLA Air Force Military Training Department of the Central Military Commission. In 1977, he was appointed deputy chief of staff of the PLA Air Force, and five years later promoted to the chief of staff position. In January 1993, he was given command of the Lanzhou Military Region Air Force, and in April 1994, he was soon reassigned to command the Beijing Military Region Air Force. He retired in July 2003.

On 19 April 2024, he died in Beijing, at the age of 91.

Military offices
Preceded by Wang Dinglie	Chief of Staff of the People's Liberation Army Air Force; 1982–1987	Succeeded by Yu Zemin
Preceded by Sun Jinghua	Commander of the Lanzhou Military Region Air Force; 1993–1994	Succeeded by Liu Shunyao
Preceded by Lin Jigui	Commander of the Beijing Military Region Air Force; 1994–1996	Succeeded by Qiao Qingchen
