= Yu Zhenwu =

Chinese pilot (1931–2023)

- 于振武
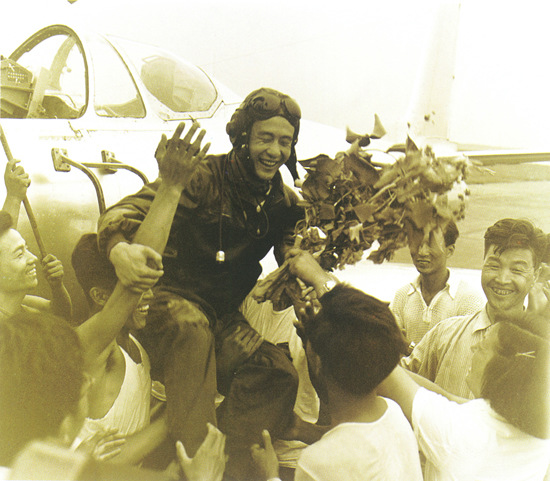
- Yu Zhenwu being congratulated after completing the maiden flight of the Shenyang JJ-1 (26 July 1958)

7th Commander of the People's Liberation Army Air Force
- In office November 1994 – December 1996
- Preceded by: Cao Shuangming
- Succeeded by: Liu Shunyao

Commander of the Guangzhou Military Region Air Force
- In office 1982–1985
- Preceded by: Wang Hai
- Succeeded by: Wu Jiyuan

Personal details
- Born: July 1931 Kuandian, Liaoning, China
- Died: 29 September 2023 (aged 92)
- Party: Chinese Communist Party

Military service
- Allegiance: People's Republic of China
- Branch/service: People's Liberation Army Air Force
- Years of service: 1947–1996
- Rank: General

Yu Zhenwu (Chinese: 于振武; July 1931 – 29 September 2023) was a pilot and general of the Chinese People's Liberation Army Air Force (PLAAF). As one of China's first test pilots, he conducted the 1958 maiden flight of the Shenyang JJ-1, China's first indigenously developed jet aircraft. He later served as commander of the Guangzhou Military Region Air Force from 1982 to 1985, deputy commander of the PLAAF from 1985 to 1994, and commander of the PLAAF from 1994 to 1996.

== Early life ==
Yu Zhenwu was born in July 1931 in Kuandian, Liaoning, Republic of China. He enlisted in the army in December 1947 and joined the Chinese Communist Party in August 1949. After the People's Liberation Army Air Force (PLAAF) was established, Yu transferred to the PLAAF and trained to become a fighter pilot. He was deployed in North Korea in the last few months of the Korean War.

== Test pilot ==
In 1958, Xu Shunshou at Shenyang Aircraft Corporation (then known as the 112 Factory) developed the Shenyang JJ-1, the first jet aircraft designed in China. After the first model crashed during a test flight, Yu, one of the top fighter pilots in the air force, was selected for the dangerous job as the test pilot for the second plane. On 26 July 1958, Yu successfully completed the maiden flight of the JJ-1, which has since been celebrated as a landmark in the history of Chinese aviation. In August 1958, Yu performed an air show at the celebration ceremony for the successful development of the JJ-1, which was attended by Marshal Ye Jianying and the PLAAF Commander Liu Yalou.

In 2004, China Central Television aired the documentary The Secrets of China's War Eagles (中国战鹰探秘), which includes an interview with Yu, to commemorate the maiden flight of the JJ-1.

== Commander of Guangzhou MRAF and PLAAF ==
Yu later served as director of the Training Department of the PLAAF headquarters. In 1982, he succeeded Wang Hai as commander of the Guangzhou Military Region Air Force (MRAF). When Wang was promoted to commander of the PLAAF in July 1985, Yu was appointed his deputy and placed in charge of schools, training, and maintenance. He subsequently served as deputy commander under Wang's successor Cao Shuangming. He was the youngest but highest ranking deputy under both Wang and Cao. The other two deputy commanders, Lin Hu and Yang Zhenyu, both had served as commandant or deputy commandant of the PLAAF Command College. The choice of the three deputy commanders reflected the PLAAF's emphasis on training.

In November 1994, Yu was appointed commander of the PLAAF, replacing Cao Shuangming. He was the first post-Korean War veteran to serve as commander. He visited the United States in May 1995, but it was aborted by the People's Republic of China government when Lee Teng-hui, the president of the Republic of China on Taiwan, visited the US in spite of Beijing's protest. Yu attained the rank of full general in January 1996, and was elected an alternate member of the 13th Central Committee of the Chinese Communist Party. He served two years as PLAAF commander before being replaced by Liu Shunyao in December 1996.

== Death ==
Yu died on 29 September 2023, at the age of 92.
