= Ma Ning =

Ma Ning may refer to:

- Ma Ning (military officer) (born 1922), Chinese military officer
- Ma Ning (referee) (born 1979), Chinese football referee
- Ma Ning (javelin thrower) (born 1983), Chinese javelin thrower
- Ma Ning (field hockey), Chinese field hockey player
