= Ding Wenchang =

Chinese general (1933–2022)

- 丁文昌

Political Commissar of the People's Liberation Army Air Force
- In office November 1992 – January 1999
- Preceded by: Zhu Guang
- Succeeded by: Qiao Qingchen

Personal details
- Born: October 1933 Su County, Anhui, China
- Died: October 13, 2022 (aged 88–89) Beijing, China
- Party: Chinese Communist Party
- Education: PLA 16th Infantry School; PLA Air Force 10th Aviation School; Central Party School of the Chinese Communist Party; PLA National Defence University

Military service
- Allegiance: People's Republic of China
- Branch/service: People's Liberation Army Air Force
- Years of service: 1951–1999
- Rank: General

Ding Wenchang (Chinese: 丁文昌; pinyin: Dīng Wénchāng; October 1933 – 13 October 2022) was a general in the People's Liberation Army Air Force of the People's Republic of China.

Born in Suzhou, Anhui Province, he joined the army in July 1951 and joined Chinese Communist Party in May 1956. He graduated from PLA 16th infantry school and also studied in 5th preparatory group of Air Force and the 10th aeronautics school of PLA.

In January 1954, he became a mechanic in a division of Air Force, supervisor assistant in organization section of the political department of the division and the vice political commissar of airplane group. He was appointed the secretary of secretariat of the political department of Air Force army corps in March 1966. In October 1970, he was elevated to vice section chief and later section chief of cadres section in the political department of Air Force army corps, and vice director of cadre section of the political department of Air Force in PLA Shenyang Military Region.

In May 1980, he became vice political commissar of the air-arm division of Air Force. In July 1981, he was promoted to director of the cadre section of the political department of Air Force in Shenyang Military Region. He became a vice political commissar of Air Force army corps in May 1983. From September 1983 to January 1984, he studied at Central Party School of the Chinese Communist Party. In November 1985, he became vice director of the political department of Air Force. He was made the director of political department and standing committee member of CCP committee in the Air Force. From March to May 1989, he was trained as a senior official at PLA National Defense University. From November 1992 to January 1999, he served as political commissar and Party chief of PLA Air Force.

Ding was a delegate to 7th National People's Congress, and was a member of 14th and 15th Central Committee of the Chinese Communist Party.

He attained the rank of major general of the PLAAF in September 1988, lieutenant general in July 1990, and general in January 1996.

Ding died on 13 October 2022, at the age of 89.

Military offices
| Preceded by Zhu Guang | Political Commissar of the People's Liberation Army Air Force; 1992–1999 | Succeeded by Qiao Qingchen |
