= Lin Hu (general) =

Chinese fighter pilot (1927–2018)

- 林虎
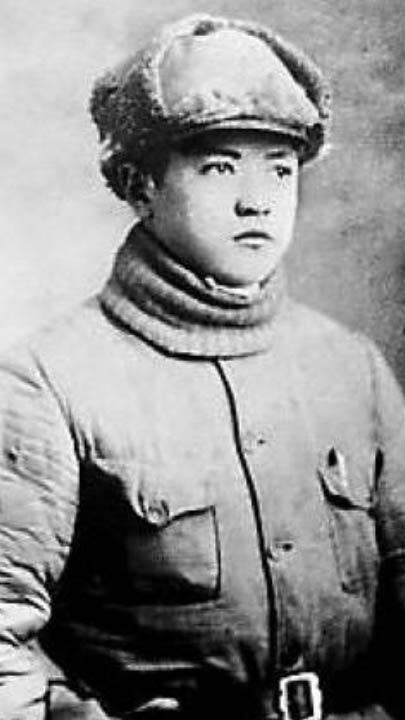
- Lin Hu in the 1940s.

Deputy Commander of the PLA Air Force
- In office 1985–1994 Serving with Li Yongtai, Liu Zhitian
- Commanders: Wang Hai, Cao Shuangming

Personal details
- Born: 26 December 1927 Harbin, Heilongjiang, Republic of China
- Died: 3 March 2018 (aged 90) Beijing, China
- Party: Chinese Communist Party
- Education: Northeast China Democratic United Army Aviation School

Military service
- Allegiance: People's Republic of China
- Branch/service: (Republic of China (1912–1949)) Eighth Route Army; People's Liberation Army Air Force
- Years of service: 1938–1994
- Rank: Lieutenant General
- Battles/wars: Second Sino-Japanese War, Korean War, Second Taiwan Strait Crisis

Lin Hu (Chinese: 林虎; pinyin: Lín Hǔ; 26 December 1927 – 3 March 2018) was a Chinese fighter pilot and lieutenant general of the People's Liberation Army Air Force (PLAAF). Born to a Russian mother and a Chinese father, he was orphaned at a young age. Lin joined the Eighth Route Army to fight in the Second Sino-Japanese War before he turned 11. After the Second World War, he was trained as a fighter pilot and fought in the Korean War and the Second Taiwan Strait Crisis. He served as deputy commander of the PLA Air Force from 1985 to 1994 and attained the rank of lieutenant general in 1988.

== Early life ==
Lin Hu was born on 26 December 1927 in Harbin, Heilongjiang province. His father, originally from Zhaoyuan, Shandong province, moved to Harbin. There he met Lin's mother, a Russian woman, who gave birth to three children. Lin was the middle child, with an older sister and a younger brother. When Lin Hu was just a few years old, his father froze to death in a winter night after falling asleep on a coal train. Soon afterward, his mother and brother both fell ill and died. Orphaned at a young age, he was adopted by a family surnamed Lin and was given the name Lin Gensheng (林根生). His sister was adopted by a different family.

== Wartime career ==
After the Japanese invasion of China, Lin joined the Eighth Route Army in October 1938 and fought in the Communist guerrilla base in the Yimeng Mountains of Shandong province, before he turned 11; he was renamed as Lin Hu ("forest tiger") by his superiors.

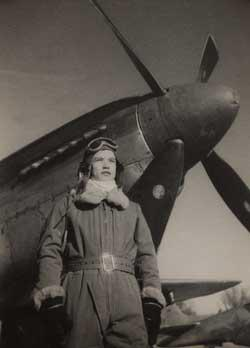
Lin Hu in 1949, before the founding ceremony of the People's Republic of China

In 1945, Lin became a member of the Chinese Communist Party. After the surrender of Japan at the end of the Second World War, the Communist Northeast Army took over a number of Japanese warplanes, pilots, and mechanics in the former Japanese puppet state Manchukuo, and established its first aviation school, the Northeast China Democratic United Army Aviation School (a predecessor of the PLA Air Force Aviation University). Lin was selected to receive pilot training at the school, from which he graduated in 1949. At the Founding Ceremony of the People's Republic of China on 1 October 1949, Lin piloted a P-51 Mustang fighter and flew across the sky over the Tiananmen in Beijing.

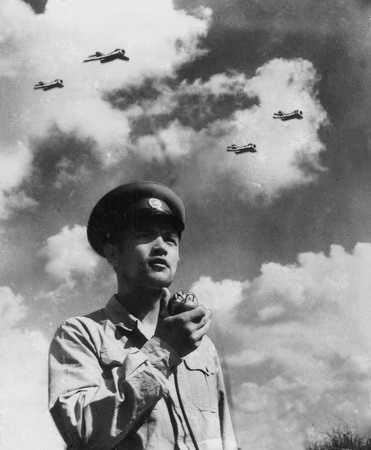
Lin Hu directing flights at Shantou Waisha Airport (1956)

During the Korean War, Lin was a deputy regiment commander of the People's Volunteer Army Air Force. He was credited with shooting down one and damaging another F-86 Sabre, the best jet fighter of the United States Air Force. After the end of the war, Lin was promoted to deputy commander of the 18th Division of the PLA Air Force based at the Shadi Air Base in Foshan, Guangdong. During the Second Taiwan Strait Crisis in 1958, he shot down two Taiwanese warplanes and damaged a third.

== Later career ==
Lin later successively served as deputy corps commander, deputy commander of a PLAAF command post, deputy commander of a military region air force, and deputy commandant of the PLAAF Command Academy. In 1985, he was promoted to deputy commander of the PLA Air Force, serving under Commander Wang Hai, and alongside Li Yongtai and Liu Zhitian, all Korean War veterans. He was awarded the rank of lieutenant general in 1988. He was also a deputy to the 7th and the 8th National People's Congress. He retired from active service in October 1994.

In August 1997, Lin made his last flight with a Sukhoi Su-30 at the MAKS Air Show. He executed a series of aerobatic maneuvers including the Pugachev's Cobra, in cooperation with Anatoly Kvochur.

In January 2002, Lin published the book Fight to Protect the Motherland's Airspace—A Retrospective of the Air Battles in the First Twenty Years of New China (保卫祖国领空的战斗—新中国二十年国土防空作战回顾), describing the PLAAF's defense operations between 1949 and 1969.

== Death ==
Lin died in the evening of 3 March 2018, at the age of 90 (91 by East Asian age reckoning). He died on the same day as his friend and colleague, fellow Korean War veteran and PLAAF lieutenant general Yao Xian. They were born in the same year and graduated from the same aviation school.

== Personal life ==
Lin Hu had a daughter named Lin Li (林莉).
