= Commander of the People's Liberation Army Air Force =

- 中国人民解放军空军司令员
- Incumbent; General Wang Gang since 3 July 2026
- People's Liberation Army Air Force
- Type: Commanding officer
- Reports to: Chief of the Joint Staff
- Appointer: Military Chairman
- Formation: 25 October 1949; 76 years ago
- First holder: Liu Yalou

The commander of the People's Liberation Army Air Force (Chinese: 中国人民解放军空军司令员; pinyin: Zhōngguó rénmín jiěfàngjūn kōngjūn sīlìng yuán) is the commanding officer of the People's Liberation Army Air Force (PLAAF). The current commander is Wang Gang.

== List of commanders ==
No.	Portrait	Commander	Took office	Left office	Time in office	Ref.
1	Liu Yalou刘亚楼	General; Liu Yalou 刘亚楼 (1910–1965)	25 October 1949	7 May 1965 †	15 years, 6 months	
2	Wu Faxian吴法宪	Lieutenant general Wu Faxian 吴法宪 (1915–2004)	May 1965	September 1971	6 years, 3 months	
3	Ma Ning马宁	Major general Ma Ning 马宁 (1922–2010)	May 1973	February 1977	3 years, 9 months	
4	Zhang Tingfa张廷发	Major general Zhang Tingfa 张廷发 (1918–2010)	April 1977	July 1985	8 years, 3 months	
5	Wang Hai王海	General; Wang Hai 王海 (1926–2020)	July 1985	November 1992	7 years, 4 months	
6	Cao Shuangming曹双明	General; Cao Shuangming 曹双明 (1929–2019)	November 1992	October 1994	1 year, 11 months	
7	Yu Zhenwu于振武	General; Yu Zhenwu 于振武 (1931–2023)	October 1994	November 1996	2 years, 1 month	
8	Liu Shunyao刘顺尧	General; Liu Shunyao 刘顺尧 (1939–2002)	November 1996	May 2002	5 years, 6 months	
9	Qiao Qingchen乔清晨	General; Qiao Qingchen 乔清晨 (born 1939)	May 2002	August 2007	5 years, 3 months	.
10	Xu Qiliang许其亮	General; Xu Qiliang 许其亮 (1950–2025)	September 2007	October 2012	5 years, 2 months	.
11	Ma Xiaotian马晓天	General; Ma Xiaotian 马晓天 (born 1949)	October 2012	August 2017	4 years, 10 months	
12	Ding Laihang丁来杭	General; Ding Laihang 丁来杭 (born 1957)	August 2017	6 September 2021	4 years, 1 month	
13	Chang Dingqiu 常丁求	General; Chang Dingqiu 常丁求 (born 1967)	6 September 2021	December 2025	5 years	
14	Wang Gang王刚	General; Wang Gang 王刚 (born 1965)	3 July 2026	Incumbent	2 months	
