= Liu Shunyao =

Chinese pilot and general

- 刘顺尧

8th Commander of the People's Liberation Army Air Force
- In office December 1996 – February 2002
- Preceded by: Yu Zhenwu
- Succeeded by: Qiao Qingchen

Commander of the Lanzhou Military Region Air Force
- In office April 1994 – October 1994
- Preceded by: Ma Zhanmin
- Succeeded by: Li Yongde

Personal details
- Born: 1939 Zhaoyuan, Shandong, China
- Died: 30 December 2002 (aged 63) Beijing, China
- Party: Chinese Communist Party
- Education: PLAAF Flight Academy; PLA National Defence University

Military service
- Allegiance: People's Republic of China
- Branch/service: People's Liberation Army Air Force
- Years of service: 1958–2002
- Rank: General
- Battles/wars: Battle of the Paracel Islands

Liu Shunyao (simplified Chinese: 刘顺尧; traditional Chinese: 劉順堯; 1939 – 30 December 2002) was a Chinese pilot and general of the People's Liberation Army Air Force (PLAAF). He served as commander of the Lanzhou Military Region Air Force, deputy commander of the PLAAF (1994–1996), and commander of the PLAAF (1996–2002).

== Early life and career ==
Liu was born in 1939 in Zhaoyuan, Shandong, Republic of China. He enlisted in the People's Liberation Army in 1958 and joined the Chinese Communist Party in 1961.

Liu later transferred to the People's Liberation Army Air Force (PLAAF) and trained as a fighter pilot at the PLAAF Flight Academy. Rising through the ranks in the Air Force, he served successively as deputy squadron commander, battalion commander, deputy regiment commander, regiment commander, deputy division commander, and division commander. In 1974, he fought in the Battle of the Paracel Islands against South Vietnam.

== Service in Northwest China ==
In May 1983, Liu became deputy director of the Air Force Command of the Urumqi Military Region, and was promoted to commander of the Urumqi Air Force Command in 1986. In 1990, he was selected for senior commander training at the PLA National Defence University, where he caught the attention of Commandant General Zhang Zhen.

After graduation, he was appointed deputy commander of the Lanzhou Military Region Air Force (MRAF). In 1994, he was promoted to commander of the Lanzhou MRAF and concurrently deputy commander of the Lanzhou MR, serving under Commander Fu Quanyou. In the decade he served in Northwest China, he placed a strong emphasis on training.

== PLAAF headquarters ==
In October 1994, Liu transferred to the PLAAF headquarters to serve as deputy commander. In December 1996, he was promoted to PLAAF Commander, replacing Yu Zhenwu. During his tenure, he oversaw the development of advanced weaponry, began emphasizing the need to fight offensive battles, and enhanced training involving air deterrence, interdiction, and joint exercises.

Liu was a delegate to the 13th, 15th, and 16th National Congress of the Chinese Communist Party. He was elected a member of the 15th Central Committee of the Chinese Communist Party. He attained the rank of major general in 1988, lieutenant general in 1995, and full general in 2000.

Liu stepped down from his post due to illness in February 2002 and was replaced by Qiao Qingchen as commander. He died in Beijing on 30 December 2002, aged 63.
