= Xu Qiliang =

Chinese military officer (1950–2025)

Air Force General Xu Qiliang
- 许其亮
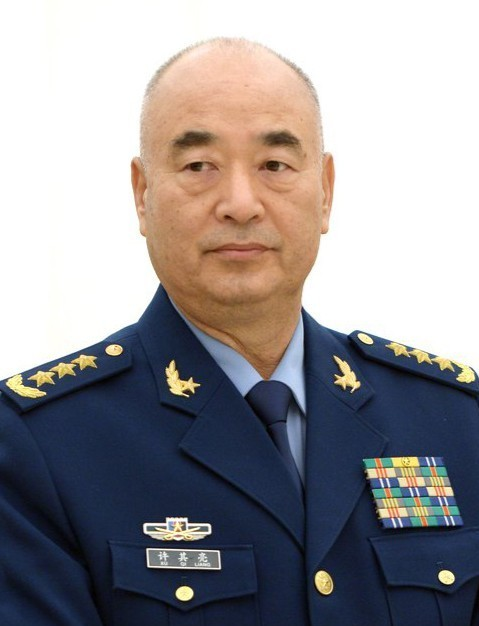
- Xu in 2015

Vice Chairman of the Central Military Commission
- In office Party Commission: 4 November 2012 – 23 October 2022; State Commission: 16 March 2013 – 11 March 2023 Serving with Fan Changlong and Zhang Youxia
- Chairman: Xi Jinping

10th Commander of the People's Liberation Army Air Force
- In office September 2007 – October 2012
- Deputy: He Weirong
- Preceded by: Qiao Qingchen
- Succeeded by: Ma Xiaotian

Personal details
- Born: 29 March 1950 Linqu County, Shandong, China
- Died: 2 June 2025 (aged 75) Beijing, China
- Party: Chinese Communist Party (1967–2025)
- Education: PLA National Defense University
- Committees: Central Leading Group for Military Reform

Military service
- Allegiance: China
- Branch: People's Air Force
- Service years: 1966–2023
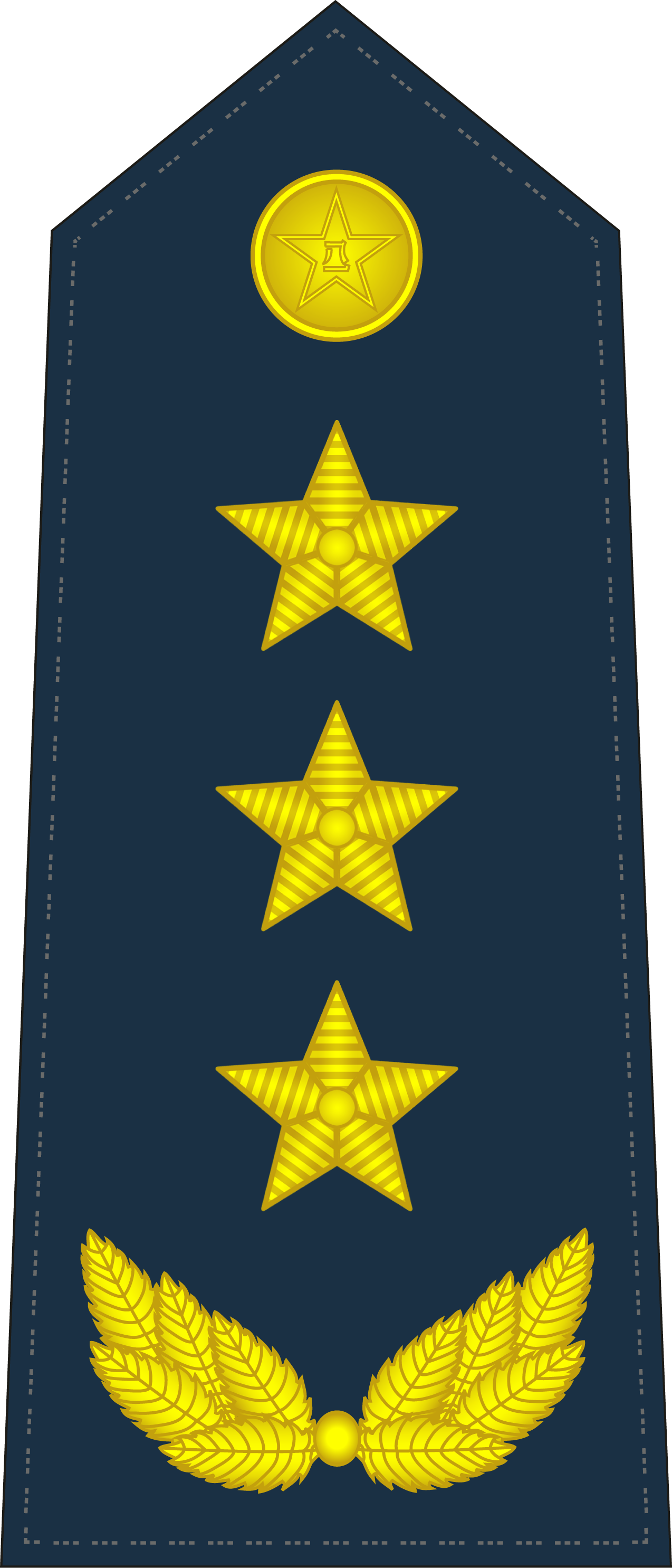
- Rank: Air Force General
- Commands: Shenyang Military Region; Air Force (1999–2004)

Xu Qiliang (Chinese: 许其亮; pinyin: Xǔ Qíliàng; 29 March 1950 – 2 June 2025) was a Chinese air force general in the People's Liberation Army Air Force (PLAAF). He served as a Vice Chairman of the Central Military Commission of the Chinese Communist Party (CCP) from 2012 to 2022, and served as a Vice Chairman of the Central Military Commission of China from 2013 to 2023. He served as a member of the 18th and the 19th Politburo of the Chinese Communist Party. He was promoted to Commander of the PLAAF from 2007 to 2012.

== Biography ==
Born on 29 March 1950 in Linqu County, Shandong, to a peasant's family, Xu entered the PLA and its Air Force No. 1 aeronautic preparatory school in 1966, learned piloting, and joined the Chinese Communist Party the following year. Later he transferred to the Air Force No. 8 and No. 5 aeronautic schools. He became a pilot after graduation in August 1969.

Xu was promoted to head of the military division in 1983, and vice army corps commander the next year. In 1985, he became chief of staff at the Air Force Shanghai headquarters, and also entered the PLA National Defense University for training. He was promoted to corps commander of the PLA Air Force in 1991 and was made a major general. In 1993, he became vice chief of staff of the Air Force and studied at the National Defense University again. After graduation, he was promoted to chief of staff of the PLA Air Force. He was made a lieutenant general in 1996.

In 1999, Xu became the vice commander and Air Force commander of the Shenyang Military Region, and studied at the National Defense University for the 3rd time in 2001. He was elevated to vice chief of staff of the PLA General Staff Department. He was made a full general on 20 June 2007. Xu also became the commander of the PLA Air Force in 2007. In 2012, he became China's first career air force officer promoted to Vice Chairman of the Central Military Commission and was succeeded as Air Force Commander by General Ma Xiaotian.

He was also a member of the 19th Politburo of the Chinese Communist Party. He was an alternate member of the 14th and 15th Central Committees of the Chinese Communist Party, and a full member of the 16th, 17th, and 18th Central Committees.

From the 2010s through the 2020s, Xu emphasized developing China's air power and air force digitization. During his ten-year tenure as vice chairman, he played a crucial role in advancing General Secretary of the Chinese Communist Party Xi Jinping's efforts to strengthen control over the military. He spearheaded major reforms, including the dissolution of the People's Liberation Army's four general departments and replacing them with 15 new offices directly under the Central Military Commission. Additionally, Xu facilitated the restructuring of China's seven military regions into five theater commands and oversaw the establishment of key military branches, including the Army Command, Rocket Force and Strategic Support Force.

In July 2018, Xu met in Beijing with the U.S. Secretary of Defense, James Mattis, to discuss regional issues and where the two men each laid out his country's military concerns before the other.

Xu died in Beijing on 2 June 2025, at the age of 75. A statement of condolences issued by the Ministry of National Defense referred him as an "excellent Communist Party of China member, a time-tested and loyal communist soldier, a proletarian military strategist, and an outstanding leader of the People's Liberation Army." He was cremated during a memorial service at the Babaoshan Revolutionary Cemetery on June 8, which was attended by top party and state leaders, including Xi Jinping.

== Awards and decorations ==
Military ribbons within the People's Republic of China only reflect the wearer's echelon and time in service. Consequently, Xu's ribbon rack, being seven rows high, indicates he was at the Central Military Commission (CMC) level, the gold ribbon with a single star indicates he was a member of the CMC, and the rest of his ribbons indicate his time in service through a combination of one, two, three, and four-year service ribbons totaling forty-six years.

=== Foreign decorations ===
- Order of the Friendship of Peoples (Belarus, 2013)
- Nishan-e-Imtiaz (Pakistan, 2009)
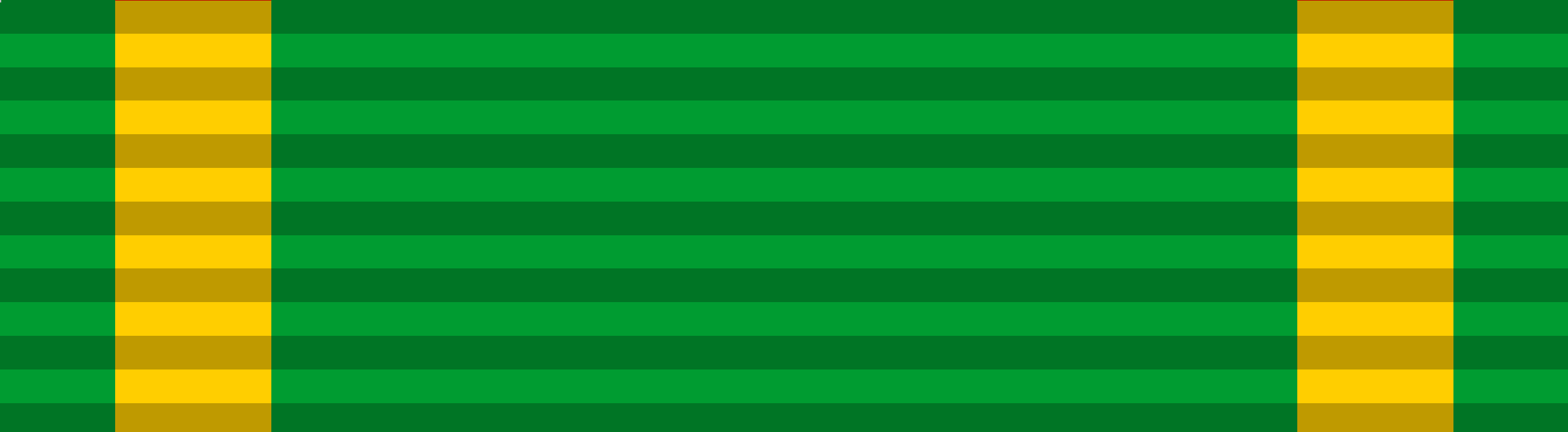
- Order of King Abdulaziz (Saudi Arabia, 2017)

Military offices
Preceded by Qiao Qingchen	Commander of the People's Liberation Army Air Force; 2007–2012	Succeeded by Ma Xiaotian
Preceded by Zheng Shenxia	Commander of the Shenyang Military Region Air Force; 1999–2004	Succeeded by Zhou Laiqiang
