= Wang Gang (general) =

Chinese military officer

Air Force General Wang Gang
- 王刚

Commander of the People's Liberation Army Air Force
- Incumbent
- Assumed office 3 July 2026
- Preceded by: Chang Dingqiu

Personal details
- Born: 1965 (age 60–61)
- Party: Chinese Communist Party

Military service
- Allegiance: People's Republic of China
- Branch/service: People's Liberation Army Air Force
- Years of service: ?–Present
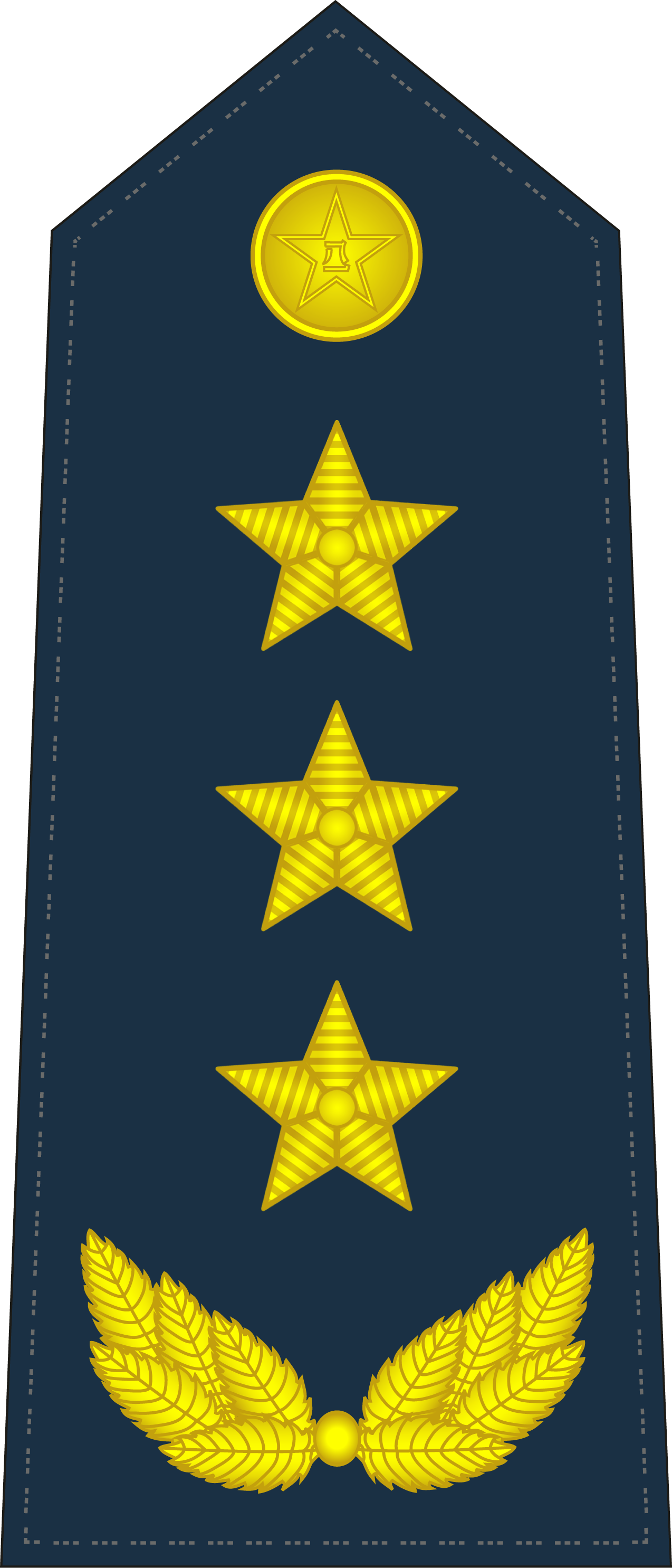
- Rank: Air Force General
- Unit: People's Liberation Army Air Force

Wang Gang (Chinese: 王刚) is a Chinese general who serves as the commander of the People's Liberation Army Air Force since 2026. He previously served as chief of staff and deputy commander of the PLAAF.

== Biography ==
Wang's previous appointments include Director of the Military Training Department of the PLAAF Headquarters, Assistant Chief of Staff of the PLAAF, Chief of Staff of the PLAAF, and Deputy Commander of the PLAAF. In December 2025, he took charge of the air force's military work.

On 10 May 2016, Wang was promoted to the rank of major general in the air force. He was subsequently promoted to lieutenant general in 2022. On 3 July 2026, he was promoted to the rank of General and appointed as commander of the PLA Air Force.
