= Chang Dingqiu =

Chinese air force general (born 1967)

Air Force General Chang Dingqiu
- 常丁求
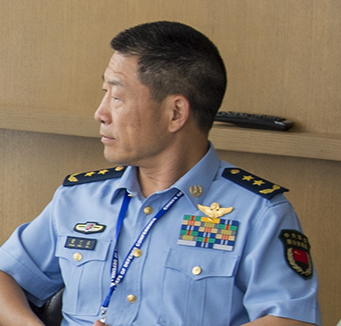

13th Commander of the People's Liberation Army Air Force
- In office 6 September 2021 – December 2025
- Preceded by: Ding Laihang
- Succeeded by: Wang Gang

Personal details
- Born: January 1967 (age 59) Hengyang County, Hunan, China
- Party: Chinese Communist Party

Military service
- Allegiance: People's Republic of China
- Branch/service: People's Liberation Army Air Force
- Years of service: 1984–2025
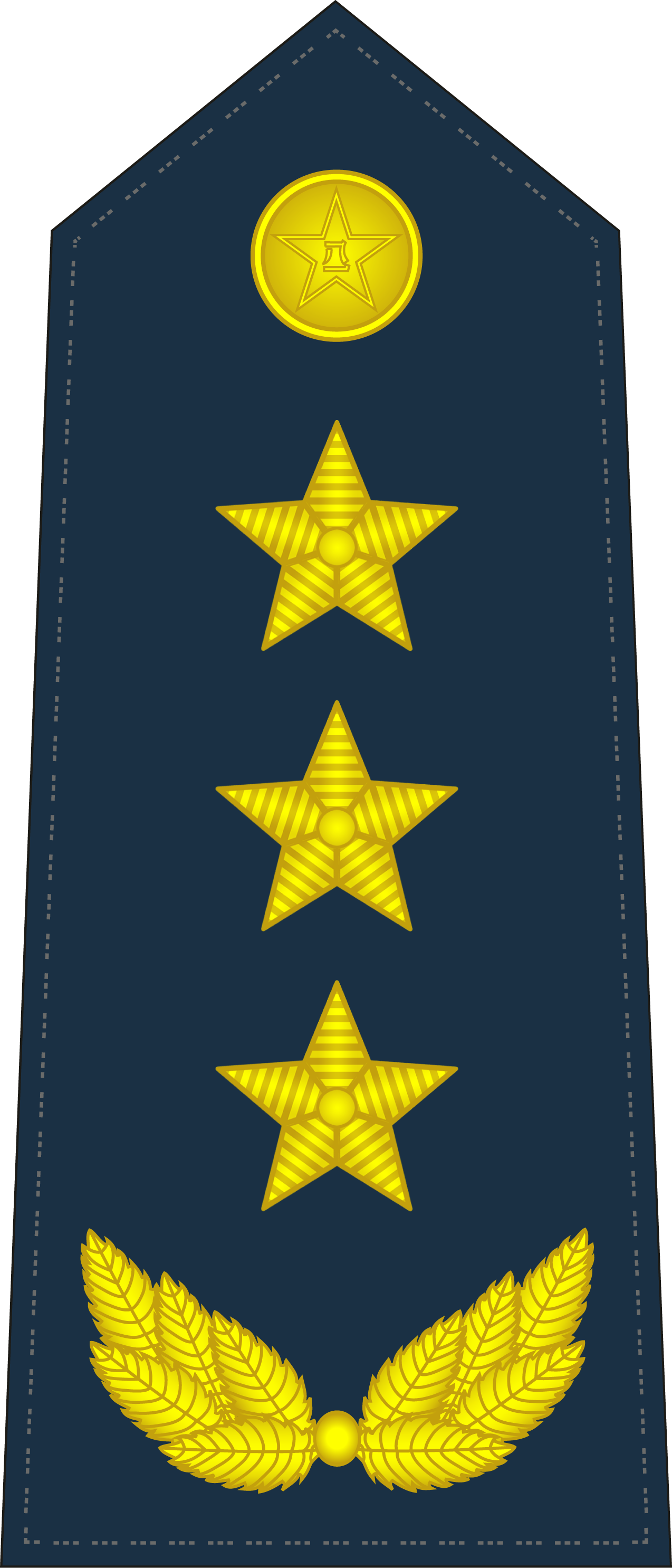
- Rank: Air Force General

Chang Dingqiu (Chinese: 常丁求; pinyin: Cháng Dīngqiú; born January 1967) is a general (shangjiang) of the People's Liberation Army (PLA) who served as commander of the People's Liberation Army Air Force from 2021 to 2025. He is a member of the 20th Central Committee of the Chinese Communist Party and was an alternate of the 19th Central Committee of the Chinese Communist Party.

== Biography ==
Chang was born in Hengyang County, Hengyang, Hunan province in 1967. He enlisted in the People's Liberation Army Air Force in 1984. He served as assistant chief of staff of the People's Liberation Army Air Force in 2011 before being appointed chief of staff of Shenyang Military Region Air Force. In January 2016, he was promoted to become deputy commander of the newly founded Southern Theater Command, and served until December 2017, when he was appointed deputy chief of staff of the Joint Staff Department of the Central Military Commission. In August 2021, he rose to become commander of People's Liberation Army Air Force, succeeding Ding Laihang.

He was promoted to the rank of major general (shaojiang) in July 2012, lieutenant general (zhongjiang) in July 2018 and general (shangjiang) in September 2021.

Military offices
Preceded by Ding Laihang	Commander of the People's Liberation Army Air Force; 2021–2025	Incumbent
