= Zhang Tingfa =

Chinese general (1918–2010)

- 张廷发
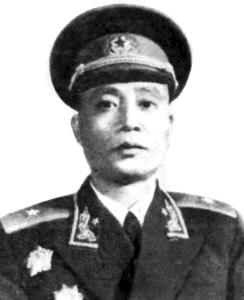
- Zhang Tingfa in 1955

4th Commander of the People's Liberation Army Air Force
- In office April 1977 – July 1985
- Preceded by: Ma Ning
- Succeeded by: Wang Hai

6th Political Commissar of the PLA Air Force
- In office October 1975 – April 1977
- Preceded by: Fu Chuanzuo
- Succeeded by: Gao Houliang

Personal details
- Born: 9 April 1918 Sha County, Fujian, China
- Died: 25 March 2010 (aged 91) Beijing, China
- Party: Chinese Communist Party

Military service
- Allegiance: China
- Branch/service: People's Liberation Army Air Force
- Years of service: 1933–85
- Rank: Major General
- Battles/wars: Second Sino-Japanese War; Chinese Civil War; Korean War; Sino-Vietnamese War

Zhang Tingfa (Chinese: 张廷发; 9 April 1918 – 25 March 2010) was a Chinese Communist revolutionary and a major general of the People's Liberation Army Air Force (PLAAF). He served as Political Commissar and Commander of the PLAAF, and was a member of the Central Military Commission (CMC). He also served two terms as a member of the Politburo of the Chinese Communist Party, before retiring in 1985. He fought in the Second Sino-Japanese War, the Chinese Civil War, and the Korean War, and commanded the Chinese Air Force during the Sino-Vietnamese War.

== Republic of China era ==
Zhang Tingfa was born on 9 April 1918 in Xiamao Town, Sha County, Fujian Province, to a family of craftsmen. He enlisted in the Red Army in September 1933, and participated in the Long March in 1934–35. He joined the Chinese Communist Party in November 1936.

During the Second Sino-Japanese War, Zhang was an officer of the 129th Division of the Eighth Route Army, and fought in the celebrated Hundred Regiments Offensive. In 1944 he was appointed commander of the Seventh Subdistrict of the Taihang Military District, and participated in several battles against the Japanese occupation force in northern China.

During the Chinese Civil War, Zhang was commander of the Third Subdistrict of the Tongbai Military District, and fought in many battles under the leadership of Liu Bocheng and Deng Xiaoping. Deng highly praised the performance of his subdistrict in a report to Mao Zedong. In May 1949, he was appointed Communist Party Chief of Xiangfan Prefecture, and Commander of the Xiangfan Military Subdistrict.

== People's Republic of China ==
After the Communists won the Civil War and founded the People's Republic of China in 1949, Zhang Tingfa fought in the Korean War, where he served as a deputy commander of the 11th Corps of the Chinese People's Volunteer Army.

In February 1953, Zhang was transferred to the nascent PLA Air Force (PLAAF), initially serving as the first deputy chief of staff, and later chief of staff and deputy commander. He was awarded the rank of major general in 1955. In May 1956, he was responsible for the successful inauguration of the Beijing–Lhasa flight.

During the turmoil of the Cultural Revolution, Zhang was stripped of his positions and persecuted. In 1969 and 1970, he was sent to work in labour camps in Yutai, Shandong and Dali, Shaanxi. After the fall of Lin Biao, he was politically rehabilitated in 1973 and resumed his old position as a PLAAF deputy commander. In October 1975, he was appointed Political Commissar of the PLAAF.

After the end of the Cultural Revolution, Zhang Tingfa was promoted to Commander of the PLAAF in April 1977. He was elected to the 11th and 12th CCP Politburos, and was also a member of the Central Military Commission from 1977 to 1982.

Zhang commanded the Chinese Air Force during the 1979 Sino-Vietnamese War, and was made chief of staff of the Southern Front, the main front facing Vietnam.

Zhang retired from his leadership positions in July 1985, and became a member of the Central Advisory Commission (CAC) in September. He was reelected to the CAC in November 1987, and largely disappeared from public view afterwards. On 25 March 2010, he died in Beijing at the age of 91.
