= Ma Ning (military officer) =

Commander of the People's Liberation Army Air Force

- 马宁
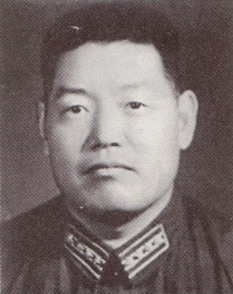
- Ma Ning in 1958

3rd Commander of the People's Liberation Army Air Force
- In office May 1973 – February 1977
- Preceded by: Wu Faxian (vacant since 1971)
- Succeeded by: Zhang Tingfa

Personal details
- Born: 1922 Qinyang, Henan, China
- Died: 3 December 2010 (aged 88) Beijing, China
- Party: Chinese Communist Party

Military service
- Allegiance: Chinese Communist Party; China
- Branch/service: (Republic of China (1912–1949)) Eighth Route Army; Second Field Army; People's Liberation Army Air Force
- Years of service: 1938–1984
- Rank: Air Force Major General
- Battles/wars: Second Sino-Japanese War; Chinese Civil War; Battle of Yijiangshan Islands

Ma Ning (Chinese: 马宁; 1922 – 3 December 2010) was a Chinese Communist revolutionary and major general of the People's Liberation Army Air Force (PLAAF). A decorated army veteran of the Second Sino-Japanese War and the Chinese Civil War, he transferred to the Air Force after being handicapped by battle wounds. He trained to become a bomber pilot and fought in the Battle of Yijiangshan Islands. He rose rapidly during the Cultural Revolution, and was appointed Commander of the PLAAF in 1973 following the Lin Biao incident. After the end of the Cultural Revolution in 1976, he was removed from the command for his association with the radical Gang of Four.

== Early life and army career ==
Ma Ning was born in Qinyang, Henan, Republic of China. During the Second Sino-Japanese War, he enlisted in the Communist Eighth Route Army in 1938 and later also fought in the Chinese Civil War. Wounded five times in battle, he underwent major surgeries in his abdomen and leg, which resulted in his left leg being 4 centimetres (1.6 in) shorter than the right one. He was awarded the decoration of "War Hero" by the Second Field Army.

== Transfer to the Air Force ==
After the founding of the People's Republic of China in 1949, Ma received treatment at a hospital in Chongqing. There he read Boris Polevoy's novel Story of a Real Man, based on the life of the Soviet aviator Aleksey Maresyev, a double amputee who overcame his handicap to become a flying ace. Inspired by the story, Ma resolved to become a pilot. With the help of Wu Faxian, then Director of the Political Department of the PLA Air Force, Ma transferred to the Air Force in 1949 and trained as a bomber pilot.

In 1955, he fought in the Battle of Yijiangshan Islands, the first battle in PRC history that involved the army, navy, and air force. He was awarded the rank of air force colonel in the same year, and was promoted to senior colonel in 1960 and major general in 1964.

Ma served as Commander of the 21st Air Force Division in Shanghai until 1967, when he transferred to Changchun in the Shenyang Military Region. During the Cultural Revolution, he served as a Standing Committee member of the Revolutionary Committee of Jilin province in 1968, and later Deputy Commander of the Lanzhou Military Region Air Force.

== Air Force Commander ==
After the Lin Biao incident in September 1971, the PLAAF commander Wu Faxian was implicated and imprisoned. The air force had no commander for almost two years, with General Li Desheng temporarily supervising the force. Although a relatively junior officer, Ma was appointed Commander of the PLAAF in 1973. Several more senior air force officers were passed over for the post because they were suspected of being followers of Lin Biao, whereas Ma had never served in the PLAAF headquarters, Lin's power base. Ma was the first pilot to become a PLAAF commander.

Ma's rapid rise to top leadership of the air force coincided with a period of radical influence of the Gang of Four, and he likely supported the radicals. When the Gang of Four was overthrown in 1976 at the end of the Cultural Revolution, Ma was promptly relieved of his command, and formally replaced by Zhang Tingfa in the spring of 1977. However, he was not purged from the Chinese Communist Party, and was allowed to retire in 1984 with the rank of a deputy corps commander.

Ma died in Beijing on 3 December 2010, aged 88.
