= Cao Shuangming =

Chinese fighter pilot

- 曹双明

6th Commander of the People's Liberation Army Air Force
- In office November 1992 – November 1994
- Preceded by: Wang Hai
- Succeeded by: Yu Zhenwu

Commander of the Shenyang Military Region Air Force
- In office 1983 – November 1992
- Preceded by: Wang Yuhuai
- Succeeded by: Xin Dianfeng

Personal details
- Born: August 1929 Linzhou, Henan, China
- Died: 23 July 2019 (aged 89) Beijing, China
- Party: Chinese Communist Party
- Education: PLAAF Fourth Flight Academy

Military service
- Allegiance: People's Republic of China
- Branch/service: People's Liberation Army Air Force
- Years of service: 1946–1994
- Rank: General
- Battles/wars: Chinese Civil War, Korean War, Second Taiwan Strait Crisis

Cao Shuangming (Chinese: 曹双明; August 1929 – 23 July 2019) was a fighter pilot and general of the Chinese People's Liberation Army Air Force (PLAAF). He fought in the Chinese Civil War, the Korean War, and the Second Taiwan Strait Crisis, and served as commander of the PLAAF from 1992 to 1994.

== Early life and Civil War ==
Cao was born in August 1929 in Linzhou, Henan, Republic of China. He enlisted in the People's Liberation Army in 1946 and joined the Chinese Communist Party in the same year. During the Chinese Civil War, he fought in the Huaihai campaign, the Yangtze River Crossing Campaign, and other battles.

== Korean War ==
After the founding of the People's Republic of China in 1949, Cao was selected to join the People's Liberation Army Air Force (PLAAF) and received pilot training at the PLAAF Fourth Flight Academy (now Shijiazhuang Flight Academy). An excellent student, he quickly became a master pilot of the Soviet-made MiG-15 fighter jet.

Upon graduation, Cao was appointed a squadron leader in the 16th Air Force Division. In 1953, he was dispatched with his division to North Korea to fight in the Korean War. After returning to China, Cao was promoted to deputy group commander, group commander, and deputy regiment commander. He attained the rank of senior captain in 1956.

== Second Taiwan Strait Crisis ==
During the Second Taiwan Strait Crisis, Cao served as deputy commander of the 48th Regiment of the 16th Division, based at Jinjiang Air Base. On 3 October 1958, he led a group of four fighter jets, with himself piloting a MiG-17, to intercept a group of 24 Taiwanese US-made C-46 transporters that were supplying the island of Kinmen. Cao shot down one of the transporters, while two pilots under his command shot down another. The ROC Air Force was forced to cease daytime airdrop operations after this loss. For his performance in the battle, Cao received the First Class Merit award. He was promoted to the rank of major in 1960.

== Air Force commander ==
In the 1980s, Cao concurrently served as commander of the Shenyang Military Region Air Force and deputy commander of the Shenyang MR. When the PLA restored its military ranks in 1988, he was awarded the rank of lieutenant general.

In November 1992, Cao succeeded Wang Hai as the commander of the PLAAF, and was promoted to full general in 1993. However, the Air Force suffered an excess number of accidents under his command, and he was dismissed after only two years and replaced by Yu Zhenwu in November 1994.

Cao was a member of the 14th Central Committee of the Chinese Communist Party. He was a delegate to the 6th, 7th, and 9th National People's Congresses.

Cao died on 23 July 2019 in Beijing, at the age of 89.
