= Qiao Qingchen =

Chinese air force general

- 乔清晨

9th Commander of the People's Liberation Army Air Force
- In office May 2002 – August 2007
- Preceded by: Liu Shunyao
- Succeeded by: Xu Qiliang

Personal details
- Born: 1939 (age 86–87) Zhengzhou, Henan, China
- Party: Chinese Communist Party
- Education: PLA National Defence University

Military service
- Allegiance: China
- Branch/service: People's Liberation Army Air Force
- Years of service: ?–2007
- Rank: General

Qiao Qingchen (born 1939 in Zhengzhou, Henan) is a Chinese Air Force general who served as the commander of the PLA Air Force from 2002 to 2007.
