= Wang Hai =

Chinese fighter pilot and general (1926–2020)

- 王海
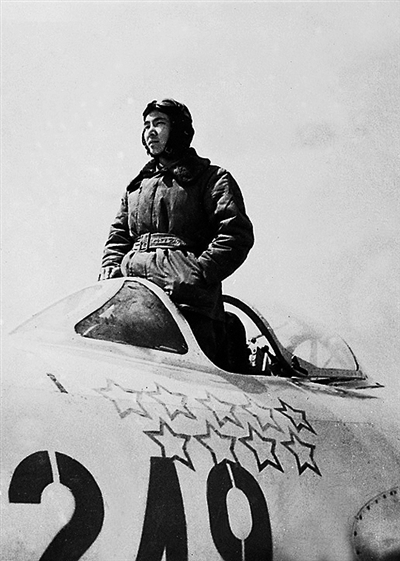
- Wang Hai in the Korean War

5th Commander of the People's Liberation Army Air Force
- In office July 1985 – November 1992
- Deputy: Li Yongtai, Lin Hu, Liu Zhitian
- Preceded by: Zhang Tingfa
- Succeeded by: Cao Shuangming

Personal details
- Born: 19 January 1926 Yantai, Shandong, Republic of China
- Died: 2 August 2020 (aged 94) Beijing, China
- Party: Chinese Communist Party

Military service
- Allegiance: China
- Branch/service: People's Liberation Army Air Force
- Years of service: 1944–1992
- Rank: General
- Battles/wars: Korean War

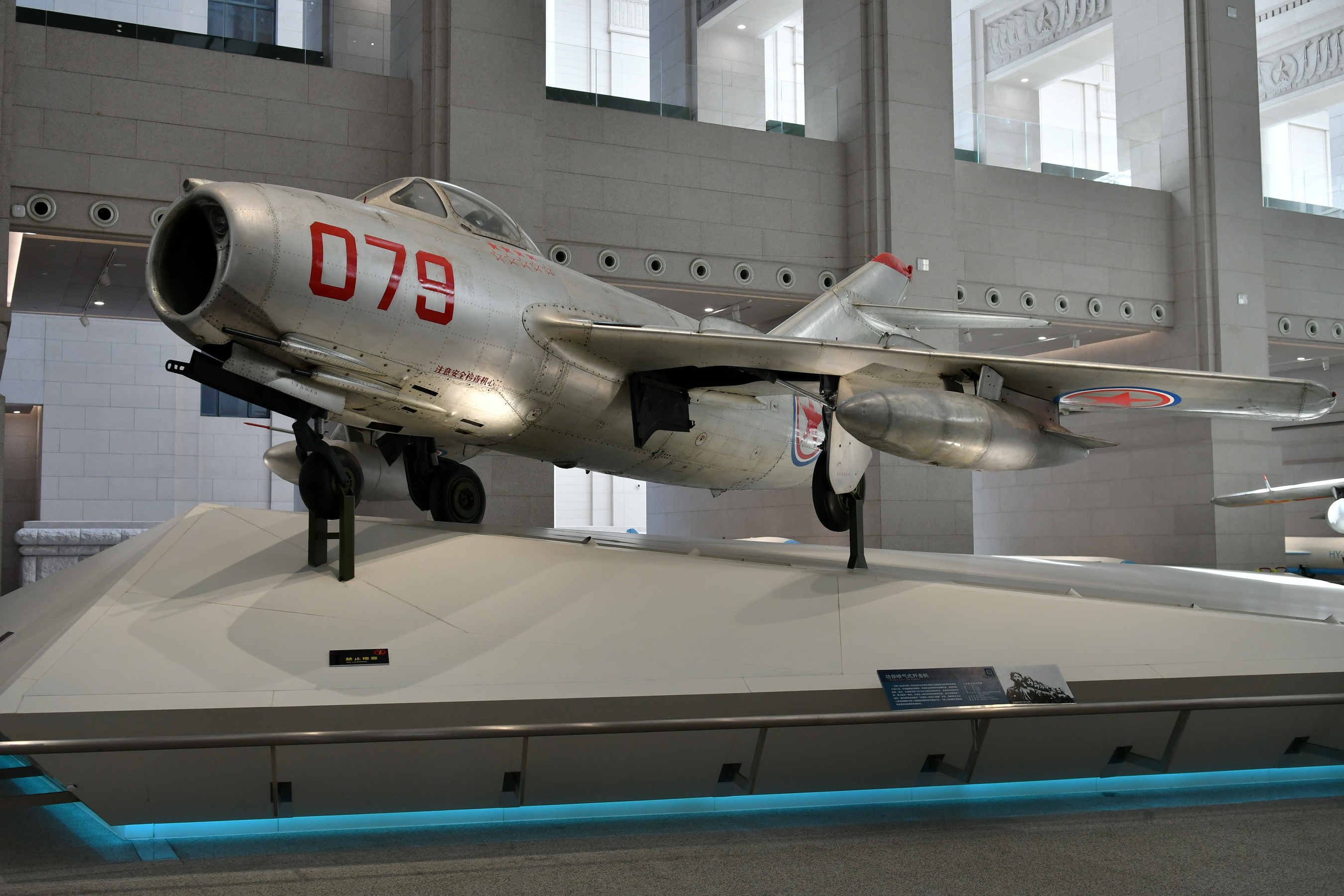
MiG-15 - 079

Wang Hai (Chinese: 王海; 19 January 1926 – 2 August 2020) was a Chinese fighter pilot and general. A flying ace of the Korean War, he served as commander of the People's Liberation Army Air Force (PLAAF) from 1985 to 1992. He was awarded the rank of general (shang jiang) in 1988.

== Biography ==
Wang Hai was born on January 19, 1926, in Yantai, Shandong Province. He joined the Chinese Communist Party (CCP) in September 1945 when he was a student at Weihai High School, and studied at Linyi People's Revolutionary University in Shandong. In June 1946 he entered Mudanjiang Aviator School, the first aviator training school of the CCP. In May 1950, he graduated from the training program to become a fighter pilot.

During the Korean War (1950–53), Wang was a pilot of the 3rd Fighter Aviation Division. He shot down or damaged nine American aircraft. The MiG fighter he flew is exhibited in the Military Museum of the Chinese People's Revolution in Beijing.

After the war, he was promoted to command an air force division, and later commander of the Guangzhou Military Region Air Force. In 1985, he was appointed commander of the People's Liberation Army Air Force. When the PLA re-instituted military ranks, he was awarded the rank of general (shang jiang) in September 1988. He retired in 1992. Starting with him all PLAAF commanders have been career aviators.

Wang Hai was a member of the 13th and 14th Central Committees of the Chinese Communist Party.

Wang died on 2 August 2020, aged 94.

== See also ==
- List of Korean War flying aces
