= People's Liberation Army Air Force =

Aerial service branch of the Chinese People's Liberation Army

- Emblem of the People's Liberation Army Air Force
- Founded: 11 November 1949; 76 years ago
- Country: China
- Allegiance: Chinese Communist Party
- Type: Air force
- Role: Aerial warfare; Airborne forces; Air defense
- Size: 403,000 active personnel (2026)
- Part of: People's Liberation Army
- Headquarters: Beijing
- Mottos: 为人民服务 ("Serve the People")
- Colors: Red and Blue
- March: March of the Chinese Air Force
- Anniversaries: 11 November annually
- Engagements: Chinese Civil War; Korean War; Vietnam War; Sino-Vietnamese War

Commanders
- Commander: Air Force General Wang Gang
- Political Commissar: Air Force General Shi Honggan (Acting)
- Chief of Staff: Air Force General Yin Wei

Insignia
- Roundel

- Flag

- Sleeve badge

Aircraft flown
- Attack: Shenyang J-16
- Bomber: JH-7, H-6
- Electronic warfare: Tu-154, Shaanxi Y-8, Shaanxi Y-9, J-16D
- Fighter: Shenyang J-8, Chengdu J-10, Shenyang J-11, Chengdu J-20, Shenyang J-35A, Su-27, Su-30MKK, Su-35S
- Helicopter: Harbin Z-8, Harbin Z-9
- Attack helicopter: Harbin Z-19, CAIC Z-10
- Utility helicopter: Harbin Z-20
- Interceptor: Shenyang J-8
- Trainer: Hongdu L-15, Hongdu JL-8, JL-9
- Transport: Xian Y-20, Shaanxi Y-9, Shaanxi Y-8, Xian Y-7, Il-76
- Tanker: H-6U, Il-78, YY-20

Chinese name
- Simplified Chinese: 中国人民解放军空军
- Traditional Chinese: 中國人民解放軍空軍
- Literal meaning: China People Liberation Army Air Army
Transcriptions
Standard Mandarin
- Hanyu Pinyin: Zhōngguó Rénmín Jiěfàngjūn Kōngjūn

The People's Liberation Army Air Force (PLAAF), (Note: Chinese: 中国人民解放军空军; pinyin: Zhōngguó Rénmín Jiěfàngjūn Kōngjūn) also known as Chinese Air Force (Note: 中国空军) or PLA Air Force (Note: 人民空军) is the primary aerial warfare service of the People's Liberation Army. The PLAAF controls most of the PLA's air assets, including tactical aircraft, large airlifters, and strategic bombers. It includes ground-based air defense assets, including national early-warning radars, and controls the Airborne Corps.

The PLAAF traces its origins to the establishment of a small aviation unit by the Chinese Communist Party (CCP) in 1924, during the early years of the Republic of China, which received training from the Soviet Air Forces. The formal establishment of the PLAAF occurred on 11 November 1949, following the CCP's victory in the Chinese Civil War. Early on, the PLAAF operated a mix of captured Kuomintang and Soviet aircraft, first fighting in the Korean War, primarily using the Soviet MiG-15 fighter, against the United States Air Force (USAF). The PLAAF then shifted to enhancing air defense capabilities following political decisions to limit offensive operations. The 1960s and 1970s saw strained resources and technical support from the Sino-Soviet split, while the Cultural Revolution weakened development and readiness. In the 1980s, the PLAAF was reformed via force reduction and modernizing air power technology. These efforts were somewhat hampered by the 1989 Tiananmen Square protests and massacre, which resulted in Western sanctions but eventually led to increased military collaboration with Russia in the 1990s.

In the 21st century, the PLAAF transitioned to more modern airpower with the acquisition of advanced aircraft like the Sukhoi Su-27 and domestic development of the Chengdu J-10. The strategic orientation of the PLAAF continued to evolve with a focus enhancing joint operational capacity with other branches of the Chinese military. With the Chengdu J-20 fighter's service in 2017, the PLAAF became the world's second air force to field an indigenous crewed stealth aircraft after the USAF; at 250 units as of 2025 it is the world's second largest stealth aircraft fleet. The PLAAF maintains the Xi'an H-6 strategic bomber, including the H-6K conventional variant and H-6N variant armed with the JL-1 strategic nuclear missile.

== History ==
=== Origins ===
Today's People's Liberation Army Air Force (PLAAF) traces its roots back to September 1924 when a small group of nine cadets from the still-young Chinese Communist Party graduated from Sun Yat-sen's military flight school in Guangzhou. Having only been founded three years prior in July 1921, the Chinese Communist Party (CCP) formed a united front with the nationalist Kuomintang (KMT) party against competing warlords in a bid to reunite a fractionalized China. The eighteen graduate pilots of the military flight school, under Sun's Guangzhou Revolutionary Government Aviation Bureau, included nine nationalist and nine communist pilots who were sent to the Soviet Union for two years of advanced flight training under the tutelage of the more experienced Soviet Air Force. Two of the CCP's graduates, Chang Qiankun and Wang Bi, continued to serve in the Soviet Air Force for fourteen years until, in September 1938, they returned to Dihua (now Ürümqi) as instructors. Chang and Wang would play instrumental roles in the founding of the PLAAF.

In January 1941, as intensifying clashes between CCP and KMT forces ended the united front against invading Japanese forces, and despite having neither aircraft nor airfields, the CCP's Central Military Commission (CMC) established the Air Force Engineering School with Wang as commandant and Chang as head instructor. In May 1944, just over a year before the Japanese surrender to Allied forces, the CMC established an Aviation Section in Yan'an with Wang as its director and Chang as deputy director. Two years later in May 1946 and after the withdrawal of Japanese troops, the CMC established the Northeast Old Aviation School in Jilin. By 1949 the Aviation Section of the CMC had 560 trained personnel (125 pilots and 435 ground support specialists), purchased 435 aircraft from the Soviet Union, acquired 115 Nationalist aircraft, and operated seven military flight schools.

=== Founding ===
The first organized air unit of the People's Liberation Army was formed in July 1949 at Beijing Nanyuan Airport (an airfield built and first operated under the Qing Dynasty). The unit operated American P-51 Mustangs, PT-19s, and British DH.98 Mosquitos. The squadron had acquired these Western-made aircraft by capturing planes that had been once donated to the KMT for use against the Japanese.

In March 1949, the CMC elevated its Aviation Section to the short-lived Aviation Bureau with Chang Qiankun and Wang Bi appointed as the bureau's director and political commissar, respectively. On 1 October 1949, the victorious communist forces established the People's Republic of China and, on 11 November 1949, the CMC dissolved its Aviation Section, instead founding the People's Liberation Army Air Force. Initially manned by a variety of units taken from the ground forces, the new PLAAF organized its headquarters (PLAAF HQ) in Beijing and organized administrative aviation divisions for each of the PLA's six military regions, later to be named Military Region Air Forces (MRAFs). The new organization, which was not yet seen as a service separate from the army, was headed by ground force commander Liu Yalou with Xiao Hua (formerly a ground force commander and political commissar) as the PLAAF's first political commissar. Chang Qiankun was appointed as a PLAAF deputy commander and as director of the PLAAF's Training Department while Wang Bi was named deputy political commissar and director of the Aeronautical Engineering Department.

In June 1950, the first full PLAAF aviation unit, the 4th Composite Air Brigade (混成旅) was established in Nanjing based on the 30th Army's 90th Division and commanding the 10th, 11th and 12th Air Regiments. In the same year, the PLAAF created the 2nd and 3rd Composite Air Brigades. Although the 4th Composite Air Brigade would be renamed in 1950 to the PLAAF 4th Air Division, it would become the 1st Air Division in 1956 with the 2nd and 3rd Composite Air Brigades becoming the 2nd and 3rd Air Divisions, respectively.

In 1950, the PLAAF had fewer than 100 fighters.

=== Korean War to the Sino-Soviet Split ===
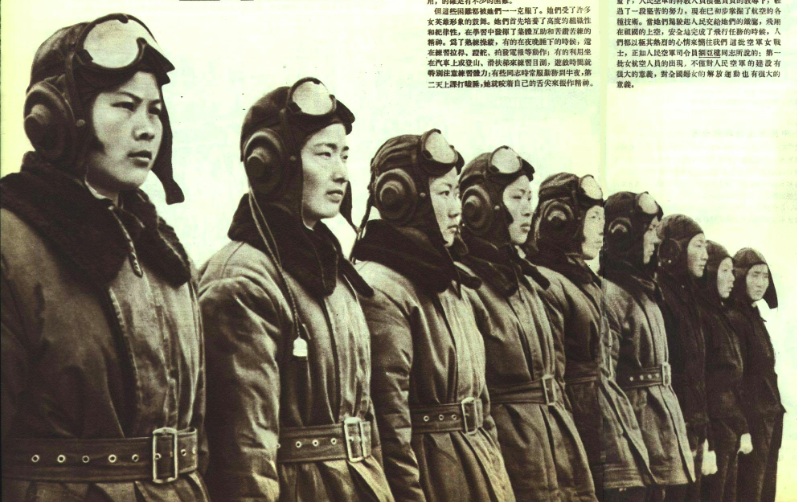
PLAAF female pilots in 1952

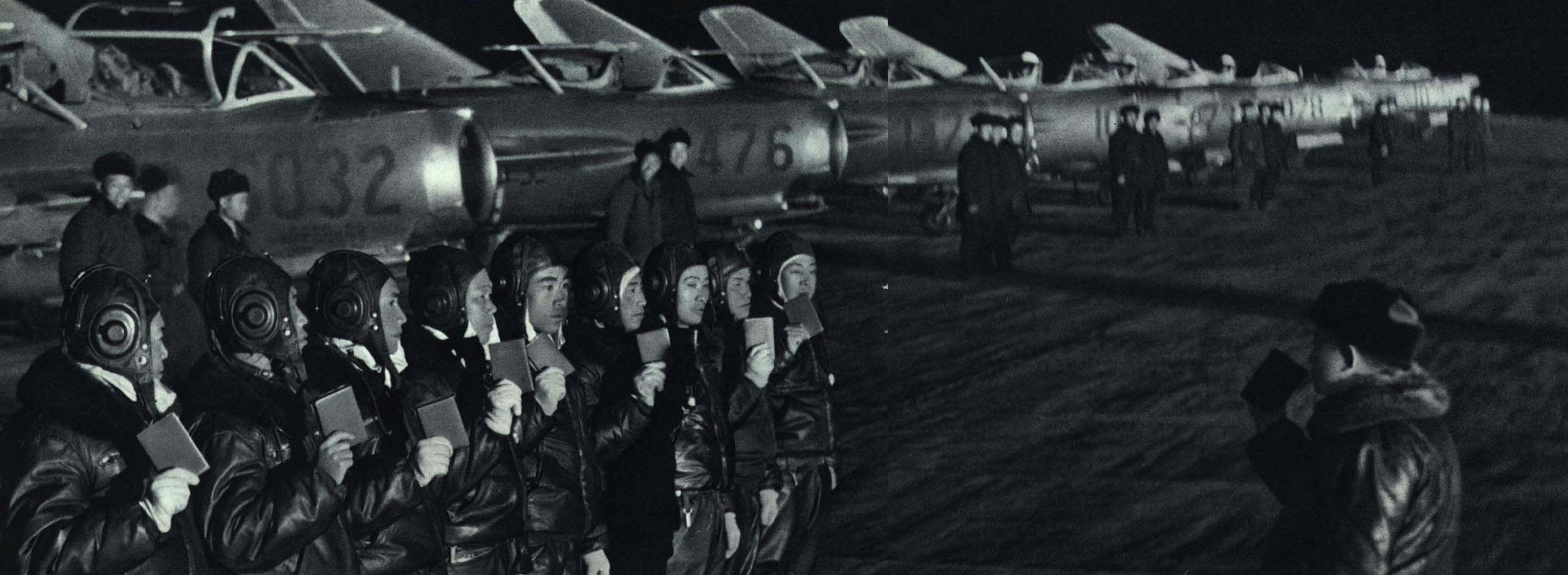
PLAAF fighter pilots in 1967

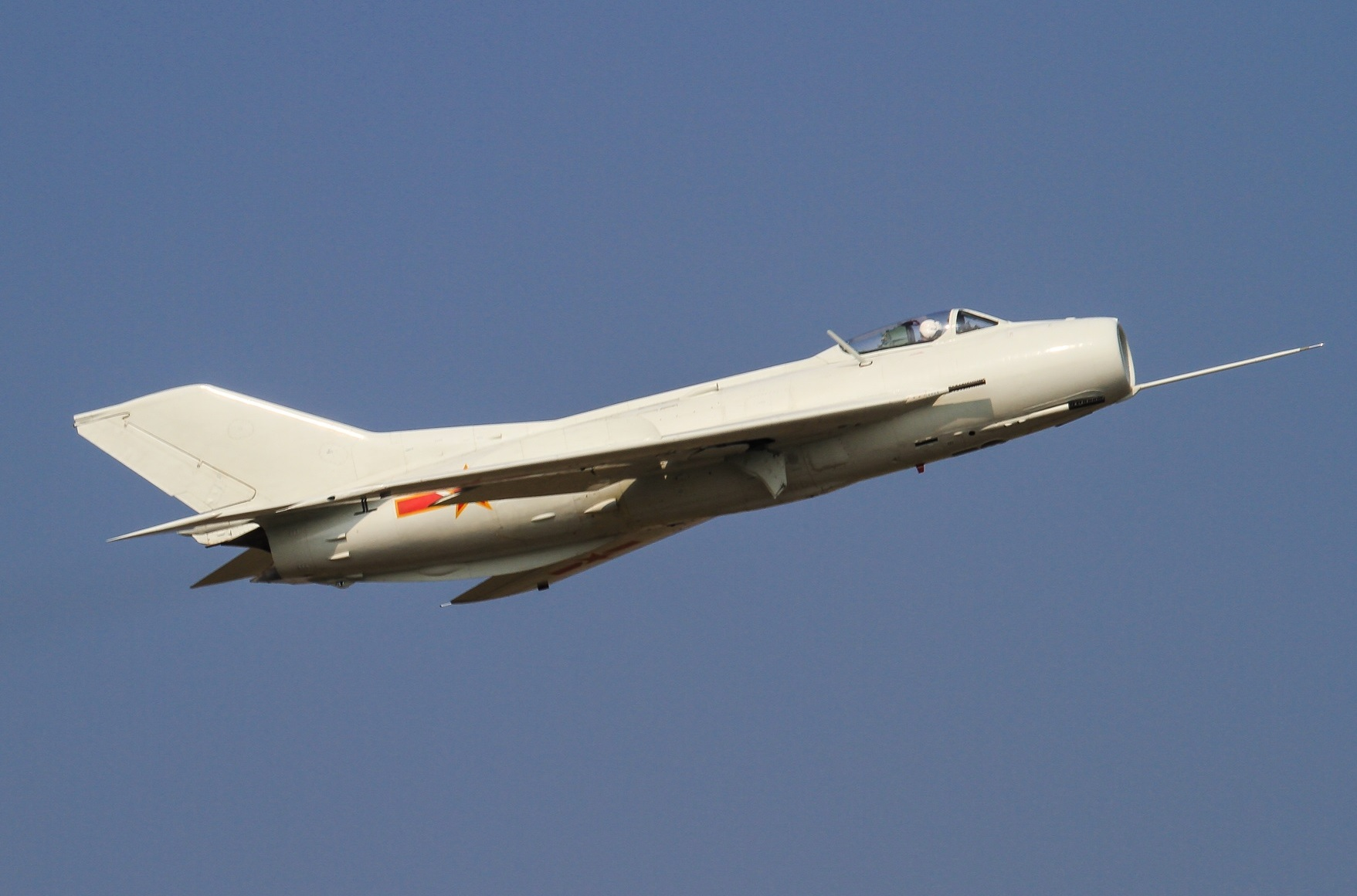
A J-6 fighter flight display at the 2010 Zhuhai Air Show

The PLAAF expanded rapidly during the Korean War. Two brigades were created in 1950, but they were disbanded in the early 1950s and replaced by divisions; both unit types had subordinate regiments. During the war, 26 divisions and a smaller number of independent regiments and schools were created by personnel transfers from the army; the air force inherited the army's organization and was commanded by army officers. By early 1954, there were 28 divisions, with 70 regiments, and five independent regiments operating 3,000 aircraft. The Soviets provided Mikoyan-Gurevich MiG-15 aircraft (named J-2 in Chinese service), training, and support for developing the domestic aviation industry. Shenyang Aircraft Corporation built the two-seat MiG-15UTI trainer as the JJ-2, and during the war manufactured various components to maintain the Soviet-built fighters.

In 1955, the PLAAF had grown to be the world's third largest air force. By 1956 the People's Republic was assembling licensed copies of MiG-15s and eight years later it was producing both the Shenyang J-5 (MiG-17) and the Shenyang J-6 (MiG-19) under license.

The PLAAF emerged from the war as an air defense force. Its main role was to support the army by achieving air superiority using fighters, radar, and ground-based weapons. This was reinforced through the 1950s and 1960s when the PLAAF's main activities were skirmishing with the Republic of China Air Force near the Taiwan Strait, and intercepting American aircraft. The PLAAF was passive in applying offensive airpower due to the limited range of capabilities and political considerations. PLAAF was used as a deterrent due to the political culture at the time. The Chinese leadership, in many instances, would cancel offensive bombing missions to prevent escalation, affecting the decision-making autonomy of the PLAAF.

In 1960, Soviet engineers and advisors left China due to the Sino-Soviet split; although the Soviet Union granted licensed rights to MiG-15, MiG-17, MiG-19, MiG-21, Il-28, and Tu-16, China didn't retain either the technical materials or the machinery as the Soviet advisors withdrew. China had to reverse-engineer aircraft and missile systems to set up production lines. Internal political and economic chaos from the Great Leap Forward and the Cultural Revolution severely impacted the modernization and development of the PLAAF.

The prioritization of the missile and nuclear weapon programs also removed necessary resources from the aviation industry, which markedly declined through 1963. PLAAF as a whole stagnated, in metrics such as flight safety, pilot education, training, and strategic planning. However, flight hours recovered around 1965 as China started to support North Vietnam and became involved in the Vietnam War. Due to difficult conditions, the accident rates raised from 0.249 to 0.6 per 10,000 sorties in 1965.

Between January 1954 and 1971, 22 new divisions were created for a total of 50.

=== 1970s to 1980s ===
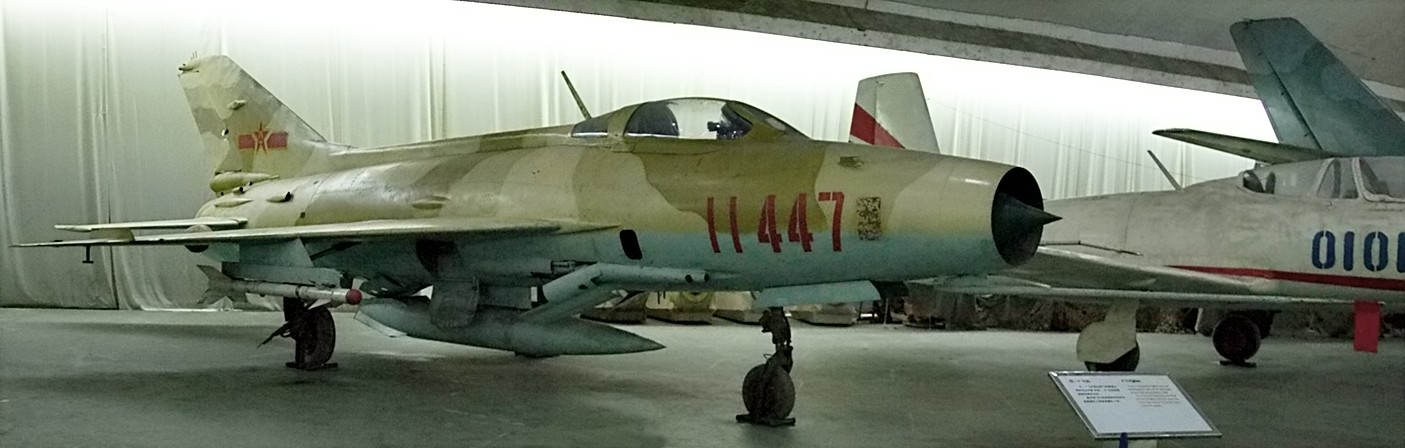
A Chengdu J-7I armed with PL-2 air-to-air missile on display at the Chinese Aviation Museum

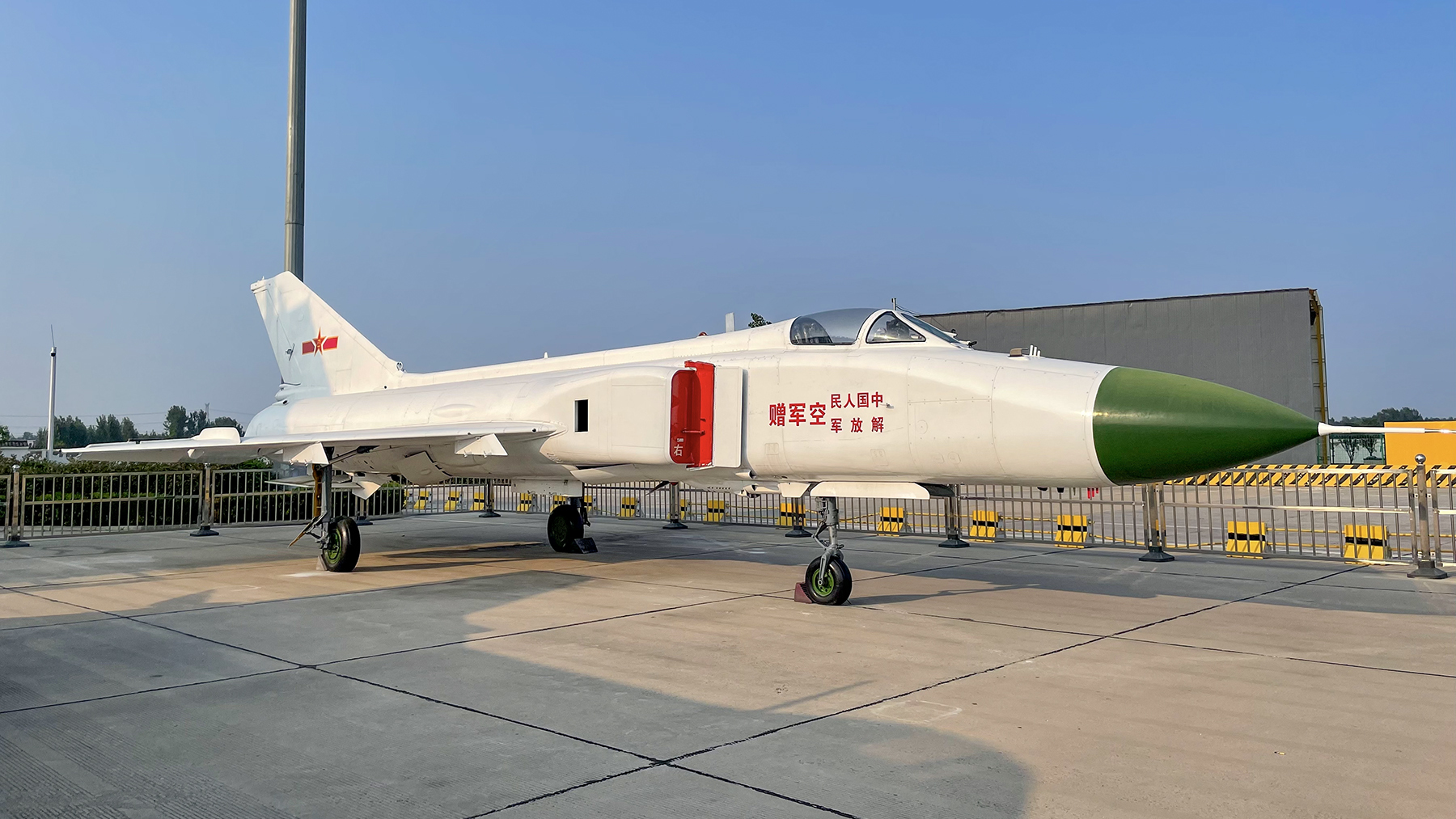
Shenyang J-8II (Finback-B)

In the 1970s, the Cultural Revolution (1966–1976) continued to damage the PLAAF readiness, leading to a devastating impact on pilot training, maintenance operations, and logistics. All PLAAF technical and maintenance schools were closed for a prolonged time, halting nearly every activity besides pilot flights. Moreover, the Chinese aviation industrial base was vandalized heavily due to the political turmoil, with many aircraft development programs stretched out, and the quality control in factories could not be sustained due to disruptions caused by Red Guards. The political fallout from the Cultural Revolution could still be felt by the leadership, and recovery only began in the 1980s.

PLAAF leadership recognized the importance of modern airpower and the existing weakness of the force in the late 1980s. After critical assessments, the 1985 reform led to force reduction, reorganization, and streamlining. Before the 1985 reorganization, the Air Force reportedly had four branches: air defense, ground attack, bombing, and independent air regiments. In peacetime the Air Force Directorate, under the supervision of the PLA General Staff Department, controlled the Air Force through headquarters located with, or in communication with, each of the seven military region headquarters. In war, control of the Air Force probably reverted to the regional commanders. In 1987 it was not clear how the reorganization and the incorporation of air support elements into the group armies affected air force organization. The largest Air Force organizational unit was the division, which consisted of 17,000 personnel in three regiments. A typical air defense regiment had three squadrons of three flights; each flight had three or four aircraft. The Air Force also had 220,000 air defense personnel who controlled about 100 surface-to-air missile sites and over 16,000 AA guns. In addition, it had a large number of early-warning, ground-control-intercept, and air-base radars operated by specialized troops organized into at least twenty-two independent regiments.

In the 1980s, the Air Force made serious efforts to raise the educational level and improve the training of its pilots. Superannuated pilots were retired or assigned to other duties. All new pilots were to be at least middle-school graduates. The time it took to train a qualified pilot capable of performing combat missions reportedly was reduced from four or five years to two years. The training emphasized raising technical and tactical skills in individual pilots and participation in combined-arms operations. Flight safety also increased.

From 1986 to 1988, each military region converted a division into a division grade transition training base (改装训练基地), which replaced training regiments in operational divisions.

In 1987 the Air Force had serious technological deficiencies — especially when compared with its principal threat, the Soviet Armed Forces — and had many needs that it could not satisfy. It needed more advanced aircraft, better avionics, electronic countermeasures equipment, more powerful aircraft weaponry, a low-altitude surface-to-air missile, and better controlled antiaircraft artillery guns. Some progress was made in aircraft design with the incorporation of Western avionics into the Chengdu J-7 and Shenyang J-8, the development of refueling capabilities for the H-6D bomber and the Nanchang Q-5 attack fighter, increased aircraft all-weather capabilities, and started production of the HQ-2J high-altitude surface-to-air missile and the C-601 air-to-ship missile.

Although the PLAAF received significant support from Western nations in the 1980s when China was seen as a counterweight to Soviet power, this support ended in 1989 as a result of the Chinese crackdown on the Tiananmen protests of 1989 and the later collapse of the Soviet Union in 1991.

=== 1990s to 2000s ===
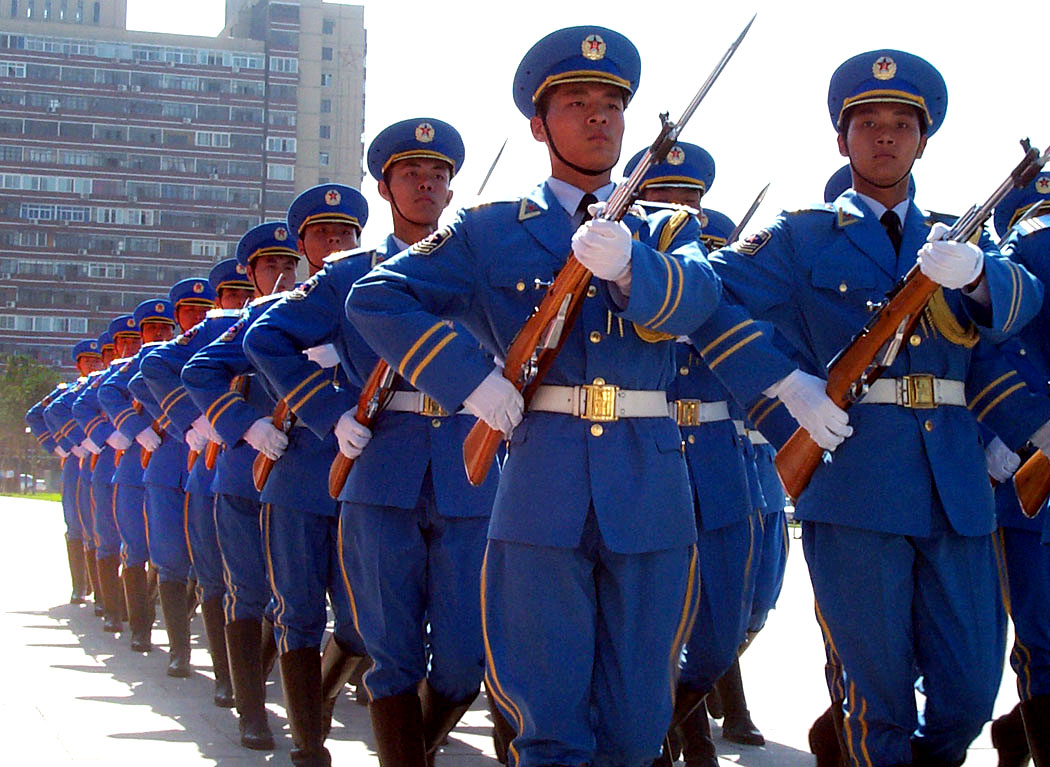
PLAAF airmen on parade during a full honors arrival ceremony in 2000

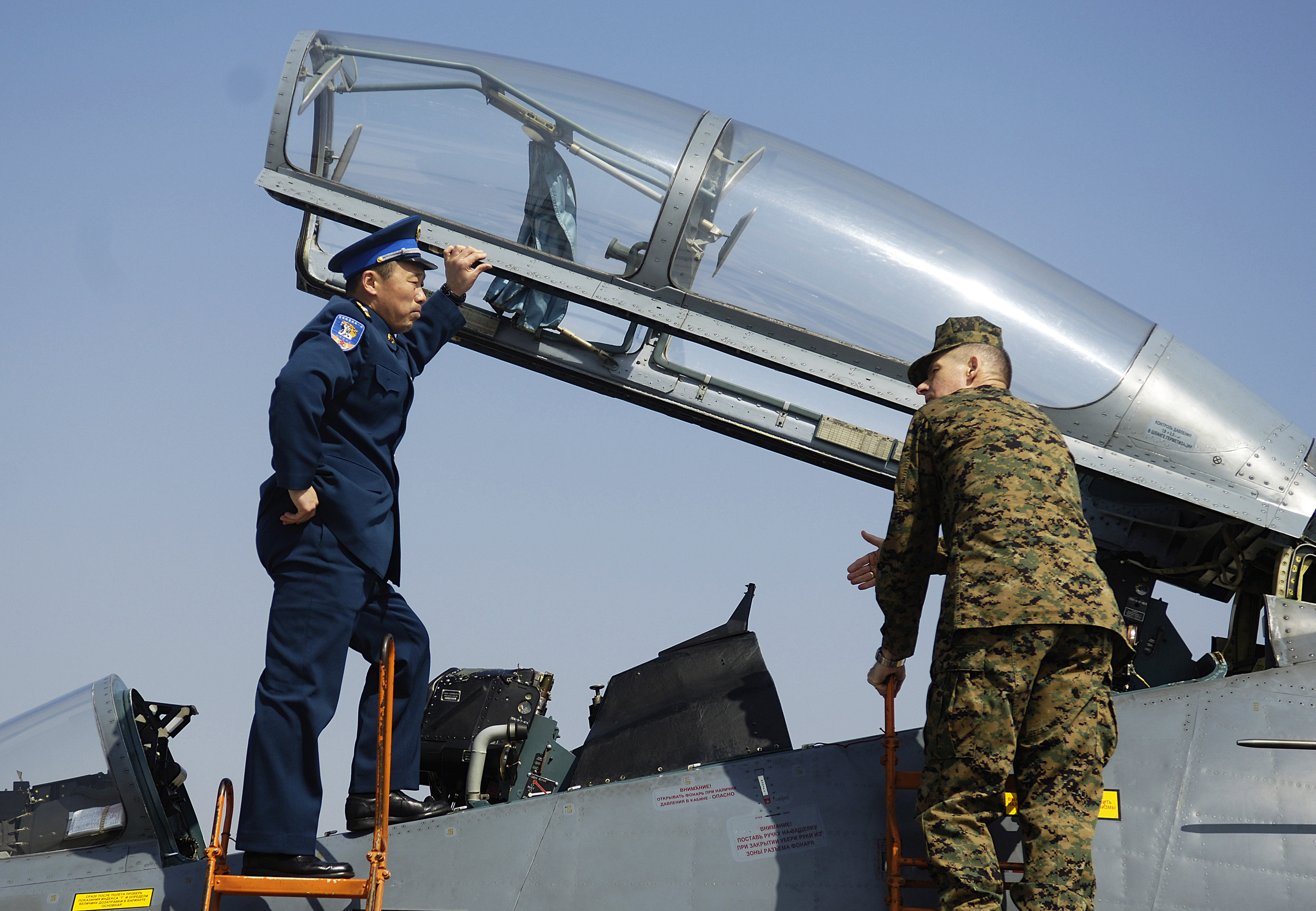
PLAAF Col. Wang Wei gave a tour of the Chinese Sukhoi Su-27 to Joint Chiefs of Staff Gen. Peter Pace in 2007

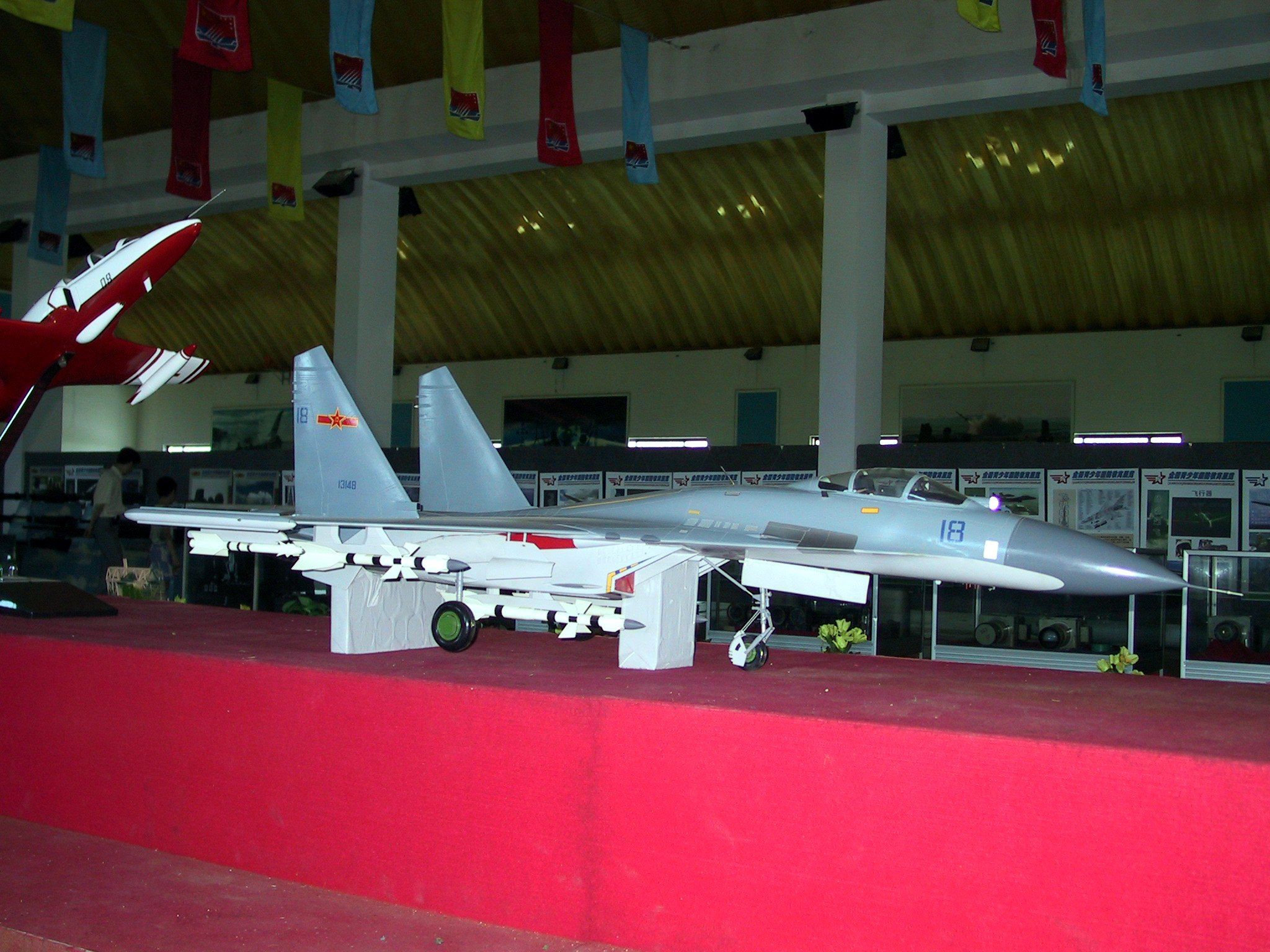
Shenyang J-11 armed with R-27 and R-73 air-to-air missiles in 2002

In the late 1980s and early 1990s, PLAAF still remained a large yet antiqued force. As of 1995, the air force consisted of approximately 4,500 combat aircraft based on 50s and 60s technologies, which were approaching the end of their service life. The overall force strategy is defensive, with the primary objectives limited to protecting cities, airbases, economic and industrial centers, and important institutions and facilities. The air fleet continued to shrink, with RAND Corporation predicting PLAAF would be halved by the early 2000s. PLAAF leadership also lacked strategic options, given the severe constraints in China's budgets, manpower, and technology at the time. The force lacked joint operation capabilities, had no combat experience since 1979, and lacked command and control infrastructure to support offensive operations beyond the Chinese borders. The Chinese aviation industrial base was inadequate and weak, and China lacked the capacity to produce modern avionics, composites, turbofan engines, and integrated systems.

Despite the difficulties, PLAAF was determined to introduce modern air power and secure technological self-sufficiency. The air force inducted the Sukhoi Su-27, the most sophisticated fighter Soviets had at the time. The sales were approved in December 1990, with three fighters delivered to China before the disintegration of the Soviet Union in 1991. Contracts with the Soviet Union and later Russia also included manufacture license for China to build the Su-27 domestically, which helped the Chinese aviation industry to accumulate know-how and experience. Other technology transfer and license agreements were also signed between China and countries such as Russia, France, Israel, which allowed Chinese access to many state-of-the-art technologies. China and Western countries also made several attempted to modernize the aging Chinese fleet in the form of Peace Pearl program and Chengdu Super 7. However, the political fallout from the 1989 Tiananmen Square protests and massacre terminated some of these efforts.

In the early 1990s, PLAAF continued to invest in domestic aircraft programs, including the J-10, the Project Sabre II, and the Sino-Pakistani FC-1. However, the concerns over the US possible intervention during a Taiwan independence scenario in 1992 to 1993 pressurized PLAAF to build near-term combat capability by prioritizing procurement of foreign platforms, which led to the further induction of platforms such as the Sukhoi Su-30 and the S-300 PMU-1.

At the same time, PLAAF leadership advocated for more active roles in the Chinese military, but was sidelined by the PLA headquarters due to concerns over political reliability and a general lack of capabilities. PLAAF continued persuasive efforts, and their plans were eventually endorsed by the PLA leadership in the late 1990s and early 2000s. In 1999, PLAAF set up a combined arms training base to conduct multi-force joint operations. In 2003, PLAAF began structural reforms and reduced the number of personnel by 200,000 (85% of whom were officials), freeing up resources for the force overhaul. The leadership was consolidated to become more operationally efficient. Three dedicated training bases were established to provide research, testing, training, and combat support. In 2004, PLAAF released the force reform concept named "Strategic Air Force", aiming to reconstruct the PLAAF into an integrated fighting force capable of both offensive and defensive operations in air and space. The 2004 reform included changes in doctrine, equipment, training, education, organizational structure, and strategic thinking.

By 2005, PLAAF was in the process of modernizing force composition by retiring obsolete aircraft. The antiquated Shenyang J-6 fighters were completely phased out of the service, and the more competent but still obsolescent Chengdu J-7 and Shenyang J-8 platforms were partially retired with the remaining fleet upgraded with improved technologies. The number of second and third-generation aircraft was reduced to about 1,000 planes. Fighters of foreign and domestic origin with modern avionics and missiles began to enter the service more rapidly. From 2000 to 2004, PLAAF incorporated 95 home-built Shenyang J-11A (licensed versions of the Su-27), acquired 76 Sukhoi Su-30MKK and 24 Su-30MK2 from Russia with improved composite material, weapons, and avionics akin to the Sukhoi Su-35, and negotiated the purchase of 38 Ilyushin Il-76 and Ilyushin Il-78 transport/tanker aircraft. To replace the antiquated Nanchang Q-5 attack plane, PLAAF introduced fighter-bomber Xi'an JH-7A with precision-strike capabilities. The homegrown Chengdu J-10 platform also matured into a highly capable, multirole fighter as PLAAF continued to accumulate experience in operating modern aircraft since the 1990s. By the mid-2000s, PLAAF had grown familiar with precision-guided munitions, aerial refueling, AEW&C aircraft, and networked command & control systems.

Several uncertainties troubled the PLAAF leadership, including China's inability to produce advanced jet engines, the lack of bombers to conduct long-range strike missions, and the dilemma between procuring foreign designs or supporting the homegrown defense industry that could only produce less capable ones. Thus, generous resources were devoted to research and development, with every possible approach, including purchase, license, technology transfer, reverse-engineering, and intelligence gathering to absorb foreign technology and build up the domestic defense industry. New home-built airframes emerged in the late 2000s, the including CAIC Z-10 attack helicopter and KJ-2000 airborne early warning & control aircraft in 2003, the Shenyang J-11B air superiority fighter in 2006, Shaanxi Y-9 medium airlifter and Shenyang J-15 carrier-born fighter in 2009, and most notably, the Chengdu J-20 fifth-generation stealth fighter in 2010. Other crucial aviation technologies that support the airframes, such as turbofan engines, advanced aerospace materials, full authority digital engine control (FADEC), integrated avionics, missile technologies, and active electronically scanned array (AESA) radar, saw substantial progress in this decade.

=== 2010s ===
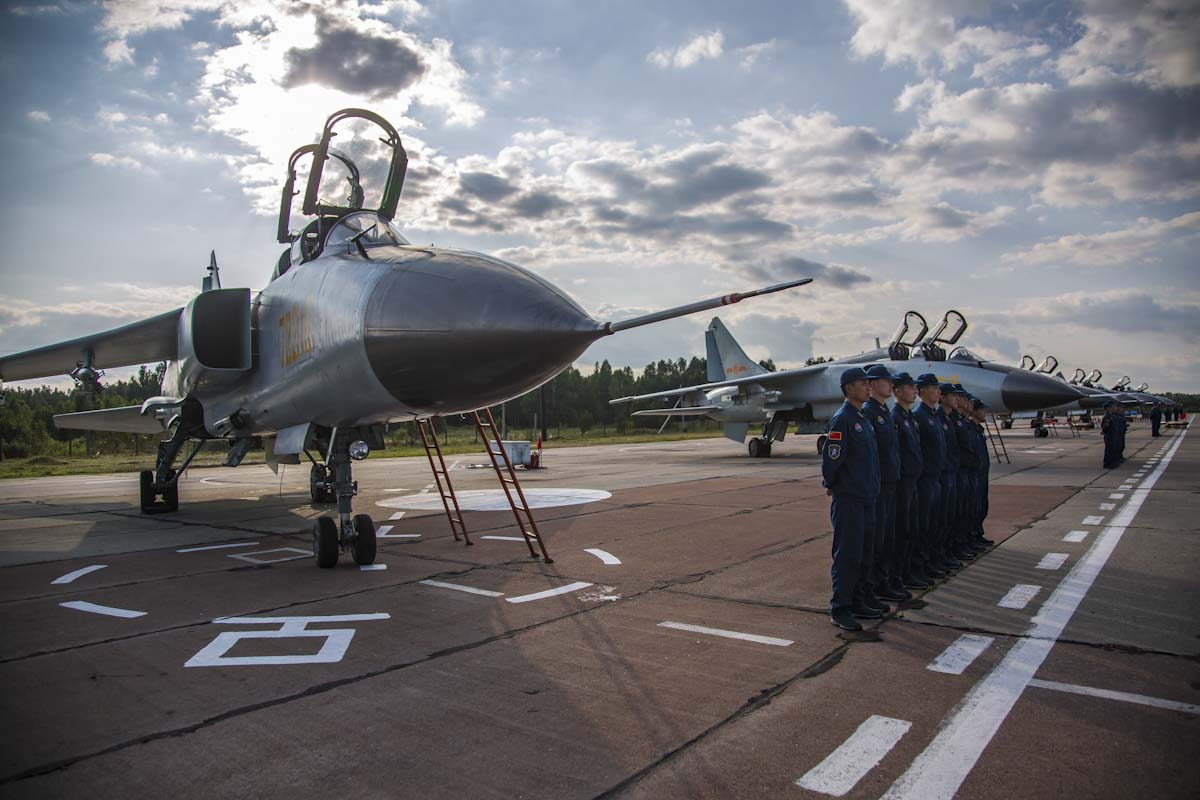
PLAAF pilots standing in front of their Xian JH-7As fighter-bombers in 2018

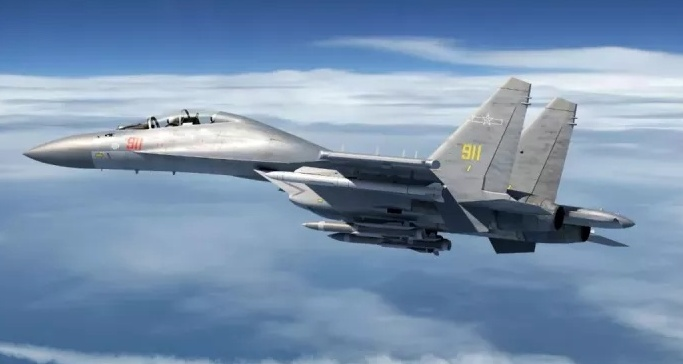
The PLAAF's Shenyang J-16, is an AESA radar-equipped dual-engine multirole strike fighter, equipped with PL-17 very-long-range air-to-air missile

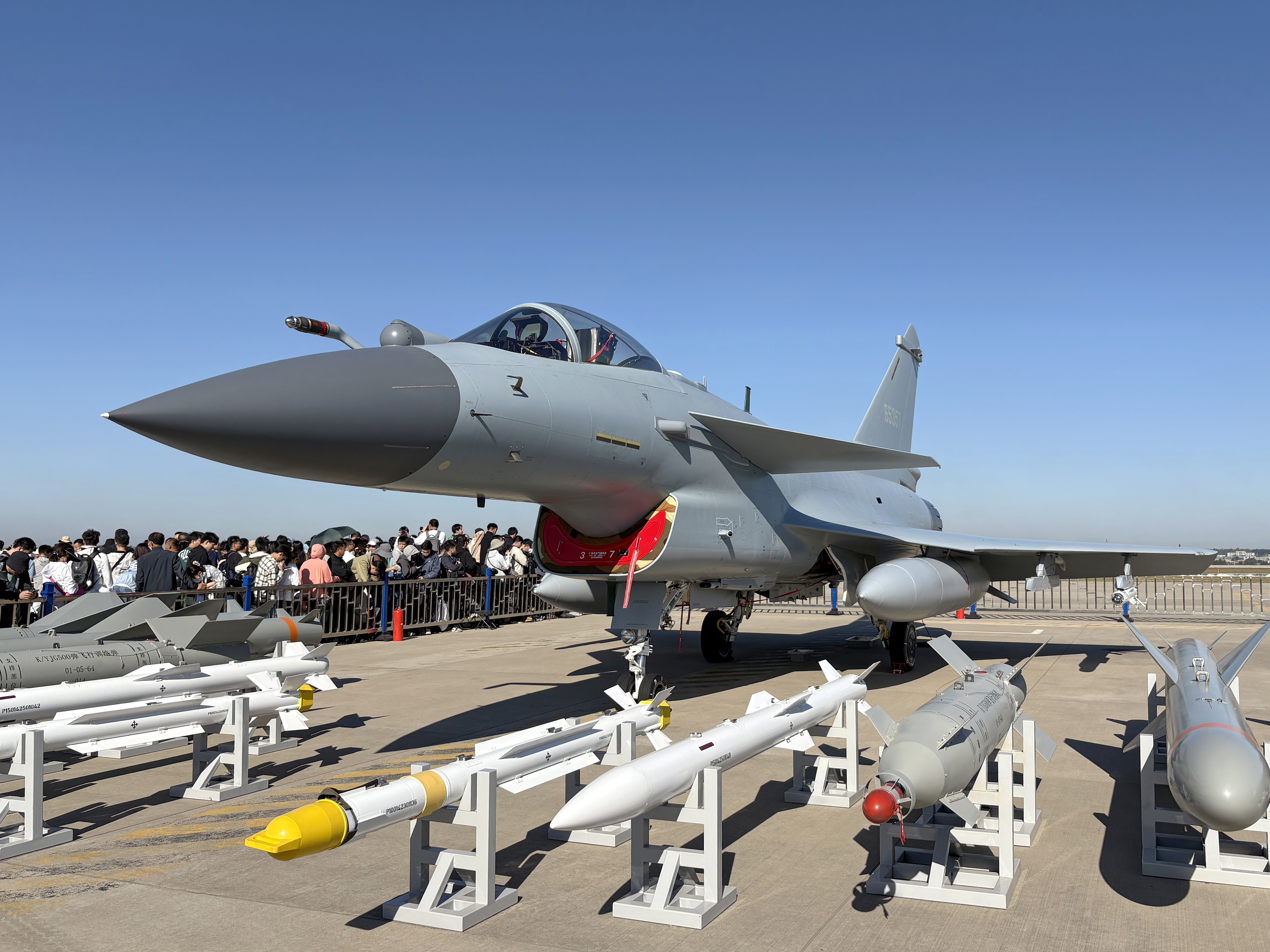
The PLAAF Chengdu J-10C, an AESA radar-equipped single-engine multirole fighter, on display with various air-to-air and surface strike armaments including the PL-10 and PL-15

In the 2010s, PLAAF began to transform expeditiously and emerged as one of the most significant global competitors in airpower. According to the US Air Force's National Air and Space Intelligence Center, PLAAF was projected to become one of the most capable air forces by 2020. PLAAF improved capabilities in several areas, including fighters, advanced missiles, early warning systems, and air defense systems; the force also started major reforms in training and doctrines. PLAAF leadership realized the current force was insufficient to counter US intervention in a Taiwan strait confrontation, thus invested heavily in a wider range of conventional capabilities to transition the PLAAF from a large, technologically inferior force to a force able to hold advantageous positions in both quality and quantity in its own geopolitical theater.

In 2013, it was estimated that China had 400 modern fighters in the fourth-generation class, and the number of fourth-generation aircraft was projected to increase further with improvements in training and force composition. According to a 2015 Pentagon report, PLAAF had approximately 600 modern aircraft and was phasing out more outdated platforms. The percentage of fourth-generation fighters raised from 30 percent in 2010 to 50 percent in 2015, projecting a majority fourth-generation force structure in the near future. The PLAAF also focused on developing long-range strike options with improved bomber platforms based on the Xian H-6K, long-range cruise missiles, as well as fielding more multirole aircraft such as the Shenyang J-16. In 2014, the Pentagon noted PLAAF was rapidly closing the gap in its training, equipment, and power projection capabilities with the United States.

From 2014 to 2016, PLAAF intensified its joint operations efforts with the PLA Navy, building up power projection and expeditionary strike capabilities with other service branches, and engaged in joint patrol missions with the PLA Navy in the East and South China Sea. In 2015, the PLA separated PLA Ground Force headquarters from the senior position, putting all service branches in the same echelon, thus ending the tradition of Army domination in PLA's command structure. A joint command structure under the newly reformed theater commands was established, improving inter-service support, command, and control efficiency, and cross-service warfighting capability. In 2016, PLA established the People's Liberation Army Strategic Support Force, which stripped PLAAF's responsibilities in space and information domain, leaving the air force focused on air operations, air defense, electronic warfare, airborne early warning, and air-to-ground surface strike missions. At the same time, PLAAF actively developed one of the most sophisticated integrated air defense systems in actual deployment, capable of providing air defense coverage far beyond China's coastline and borders. In the same year, PLAAF general Ma Xiaotian announced that China was developing a new type of long-range bomber on the air force's open day, which was later named the Xian H-20 stealth bomber.

After the reform, analysts noted PLAAF's joint operation and integrated fighting capabilities were considerably improved. In March 2017, PLAAF incorporated Chengdu J-20 stealth fighter into service and formed the first combat unit in February 2018, making China the second country in the world and the first in Asia to field an operational stealth aircraft. Around the same time, PLAAF introduced the PL-10 and PL-15 missiles, which noticeably improved the PLAAF's air combat capability. By 2019, aviation researchers believed that Chinese weapon platforms have reached approximate parity with Western equivalents, and surpassed Russia in most aspects of aviation technology development and implementation. In 2019 and 2020, PLAAF began to reform its pilot curriculum and transitional training programs, inducting advanced jet trainers and active-service fighters at dedicated training academies, ending the traditional practice of training pilot at operational units. The measure improved training efficiency and prevented distraction to the defense responsibilities of the active units.

According to International Institute for Strategic Studies, PLAAF had an unprecedented military build-up between 2016 and 2022. The force successfully closed the gap with the West due to improved domestic production, introducing indigenously developed airframes, composite materials, turbofan engines, advanced avionics, and weapon systems. In six years, PLAAF incorporated over 600 fourth- and fifth-generation aircraft in more than 19 frontline combat brigades. The modern Chengdu J-10C, Shenyang J-16, and Chengdu J-20 are all equipped with AESA radar systems, domestic WS-10 engines, standoff weapons, and long-range air-to-air missiles. PLAAF also made substantial progress with larger aircraft design and production in the form of Xian Y-20 and WS-20 engines. In 2021, PLAAF announced the force had achieved the status of "Strategic Air Force". Though this self-claimed designation wasn't universally agreed upon, many analysts acknowledged its rapid modernization progress. According to an Air University assessment in 2022, PLAAF was adjudged a strategic air force with the capabilities of long-distance power projection, maintaining combat readiness, and conducting global operations to protect Chinese interests. In 2023, PLAAF planned to decommission all older Chengdu J-7 and Shenyang J-8 platforms, which completed the PLAAF's transition to an air fleet composed of only fourth-generation and fifth-generation combat aircraft.

=== 2020s ===
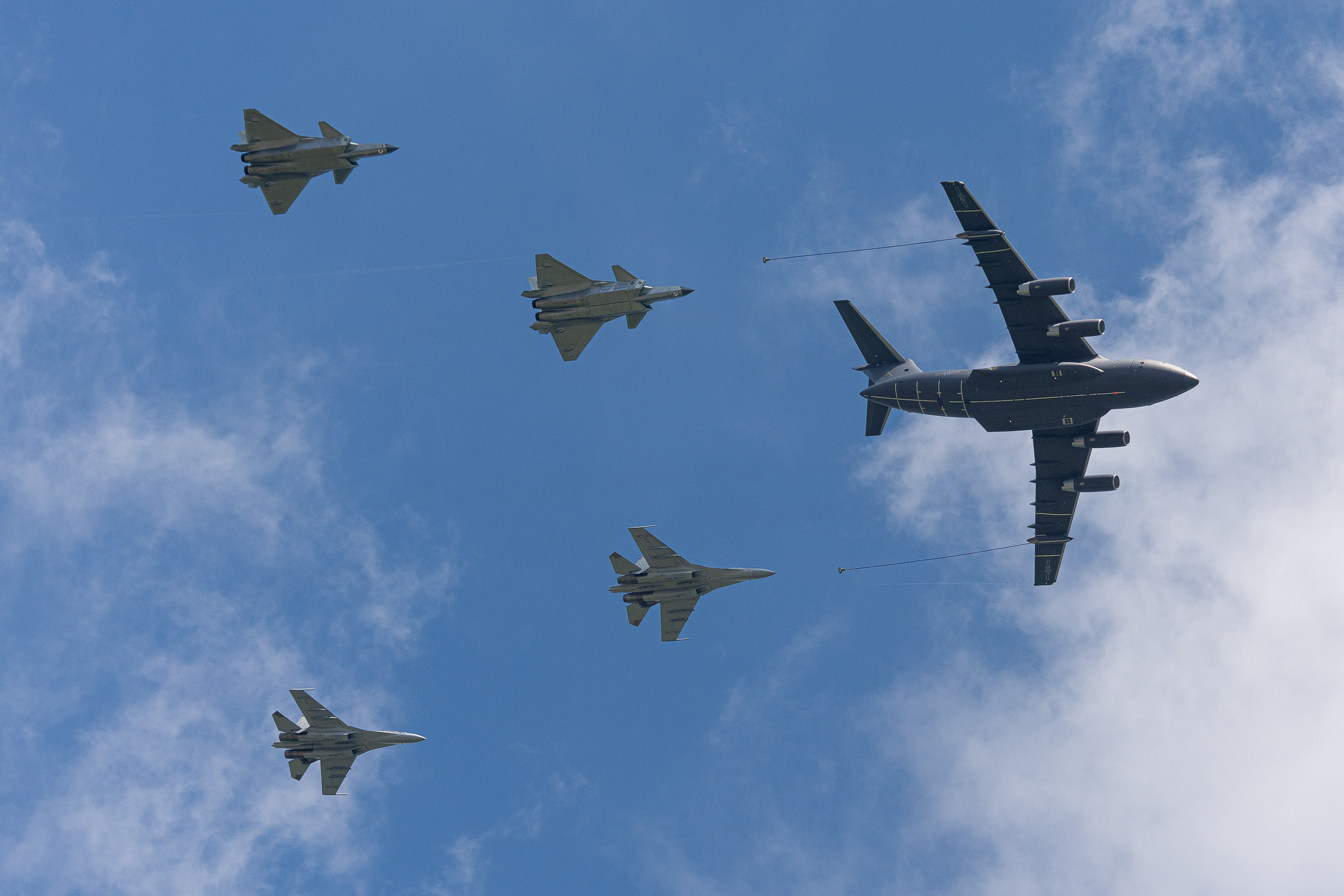
4.5 generation Shenyang J-16 and fifth-generation Chengdu J-20 multirole fighters along with tanker aircraft Xian YY-20 in an aerial refueling formation

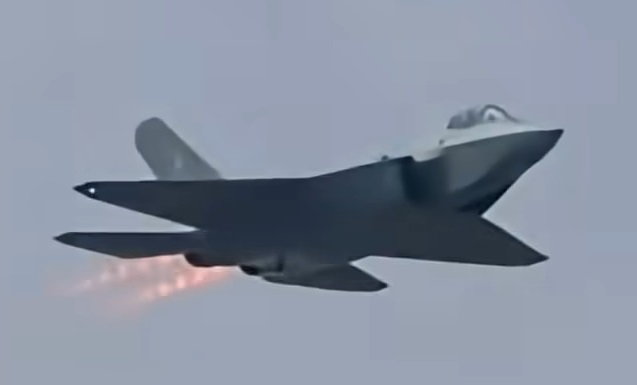
Fifth-generation Shenyang J-35A multirole fighter

In 2020, the PLAAF started to replace training aircraft with newer designs, such as the Hongdu JL-10. New aircraft and revised flight training programs improved training efficiency. PLAAF also emphasized gaining combat experience and tactical insights through sending pilots to foreign independent flight schools or recruiting foreign nationals to Chinese training bases. Pilots from across multiple Western militaries were reportedly recruited to help the Chinese military understand and counter Western aircraft and tactics.

Since 2021, China has also rapidly expanded its ability to assemble and deliver aircraft. Major expansions and infrastructure improvements of Aviation Industry Corporation of China (AVIC) manufacturing facilities were observed across China. By 2027, the AVIC was capable of delivering at least 250 aircraft per year to the PLAAF, while the whole AVIC would have the capacity to produce 300-400 fourth- and fifth-generation fighters annually. With the expanded industrial base, the PLAAF aircraft fleet saw extraordinary qualitative and quantitative increases between 2020 and 2026. The premier aircraft Chengdu J-20 grew from 50 airframes in 2020 to 300 in mid-2025, with additional variants (J-20A and J-20S) entering service. Similarly, the Shenyang J-16 number grew to 450 in 2025, while all variants of the J-10 grew to 550.

Besides the quantitative edge in the fourth- and fifth-generation aircraft, the PLAAF also saw diverse new capabilities added. The force introduced a new electronic warfare aircraft (J-16D), a new stealth fighter (Shenyang J-35A), improved quality of aircrew and exercise programme, large-scale deployment of competitive missile systems such as PL-15 and PL-17 with notable combat performance, enhanced surface-to-air missile capability (including HQ-9B/C, HQ-19, HQ-22, and HQ-26), and a thorough improvement in airborne sensor nodes (KJ-500) backed by orbital ISR and communication capabilities. The PLAAF also began to experiment with the forefront of jet fighter technologies. Its Xinjiang airbase hosted two sixth-generation aircraft prototypes.

Compared with the PLAAF two decades ago, the modern PLAAF in 2025 has significantly adjusted its force structure, roles in warfare, and the composition of assets. The PLAAF's equipment procurement became highly indigenous, removing dependency on foreign suppliers, even for sophisticated components such as the jet engine. The force also retired nearly all its low-tech systems and focused on deploying systems with stealth, air-defense penetration, and stand-off strike capabilities. The force also improved the percentage mix of support aircraft, such as aerial refuelers, strategic airlifts, AWACS, and AEW platforms, ensuring the effectiveness of the combat aircraft force. With 250 J-20 units it holds the world's second largest stealth aircraft fleet after the United States.

== Personnel ==
=== Ranks and insignia ===
PLAAF roundel.

PLAAF low-visibility roundel.

The ranks in the Chinese People's Liberation Army Air Force are identical to those of the other three services, except that those of the PLA Air Force are prefixed by 空军; Kōngjūn; 'Air Force'. See Ranks of the People's Liberation Army or the article on an individual rank for details on the evolution of rank and insignia in the PLAAF. The above main article primarily covers the existing ranks and insignia as of 2017.

The main roundel of the PLAAF is the PLA emblem, a red star fimbriated yellow, charged with yellow Chinese characters for "eight" and "one", (Note: representing 1 August 1927, the date of the formation of the PLA) in front of a red band fimbriated yellow, similar to the Soviet and Russian Air Force's roundels. PLAAF aircraft usually carry these markings on the fins as well as the wings, usually the low-visibility version.

=== Leadership ===
Commanders

- Liu Yalou (刘亚楼)Sr Gen (Oct 1949－May 1965)
- Wu Faxian (吴法宪) Lt Gen (May 1965－Sep 1971)
- Ma Ning (马宁) Maj Gen (May 1973－Feb 1977)
- Zhang Tingfa (张廷发) Maj Gen (Apr 1977－Jul 1985)
- Wang Hai (王海) Gen (Jul 1985－Nov 1992)
- Cao Shuangming (曹双明) Gen (Nov 1992－Oct 1994)
- Yu Zhenwu (于振武) Gen (Oct 1994－Nov 1996)
- Liu Shunyao (刘顺尧) PLAAF Gen (November 1996－May 2002)
- Qiao Qingchen (乔清晨) PLAAF Gen (May 2002－Sep 2007)
- Xu Qiliang (许其亮) PLAAF Gen (Sep 2007－Oct 2012)
- Ma Xiaotian (马晓天) PLAAF Gen (Oct 2012－Aug 2017)
- Ding Laihang (丁来杭) PLAAF Gen (Aug 2017－Sep 2021)
- Chang Dingqiu (常丁求) PLAAF Gen (Sep 2021－July 2026)
- Wang Gang (王刚) PLAAF Gen (July 2026－present)

Political commissars

- Xiao Hua (萧华) Sr Gen (Oct 1949－Apr 1950)
- Wu Faxian (吴法宪) Lt Gen (Feb 1957－May 1965)
- Yu Lijin (余立金) (May 1965－March 1968)
- Wang Huiqiu (王辉球) (Sep 1968－May 1973)
- Fu Chuanzuo (傅传作) (May 1973－Oct 1975)
- Zhang Tingfa (张廷发) (Oct 1975－Apr 1977)
  - Yu Lijin (余立金) (Aug 1975－Dec 1978; 2nd cmssr)
- Gao Houliang (高厚良) (Apr 1977－Jul 1985)
- Zhu Guang (朱光) Lt Gen (Jul 1985－Nov 1992)
- Ding Wenchang (丁文昌) Gen (Nov 1992－Jan 1999)
- Qiao Qingchen (乔清晨) PLAAF Gen (Jan 1999－May 2002)
- Deng Changyou (邓昌友) PLAAF Gen (May 2002－Oct 2012)
- Tian Xiusi (田修思) PLAAF Gen (Oct 2012－Jul 2015)
- Yu Zhongfu (于忠福) PLAAF Gen (Jul 2015－Jan 2022)
- Guo Puxiao (郭普校) PLAAF Gen (Jan 2022－Dec 2025)
- Shi Honggan (史洪干) PLAAF Gen (Dec 2025－present)

== Organizational structure ==
The post-2015 reforms reorganized the PLAAF in a similar fashion to the other services. PLAAF headquarters became a theater command grade unit. It was removed from the operational chain of command, and its responsibilities refocused on force building. The new Theater Command Air Force (TCAF) headquarters, deputy theater command grade units, were assigned command responsibilities and responsibility for most tactical assets. PLAAF headquarters retained control some units, including special mission aircraft, transport aircraft, and the Airborne Corps. The TCAFs were operationally subordinated to theater commands, which in turn were subordinated to the CMC.

=== Headquarters ===
PLAAF headquarters is responsible for force building. Its operational control is limited to special mission aviation unit, one transport division, one search and rescue brigade, and the Airborne Corps.

CCP oversight, in accordance to the dual command system, is exercised through PLAAF headquarter's Party Standing Committee. It includes the headquarters' senior officers and is chaired by the PLAAF's political commissar (the party secretary and a theater grade office) and the PLAAF's commander (the party deputy secretary). The larger PLAAF Party Congress meets twice a year.

==== Departments ====
The headquarters has four departments.

The Staff Department (SD) is a deputy theater command grade unit responsible for organizational structure, personnel management, intelligence, communications, radar, air traffic control, weather support, developing air force military theory, and managing education and safety. It was formerly the Headquarters Department.

The Political Work Department (PWD) is a deputy theater command grade unit responsible for the maintaining personnel records, propaganda, security, education, cultural activities, civilian–military relations, party discipline, and party organizations. It was formerly the Political Department.

The Logistics Department is corps grade unit responsible for transportation, finances, materials, supplies, and medical care.

The Equipment Department is corps grade unit responsible for managing all equipment through their entire lifecycle.

In 2016, the former Political Department's Discipline Inspection Commission (DIC) was upgraded to an independent deputy theater command grade unit. It is the main body responsible for maintaining party discipline and controlling corruption and works closely with the CMC's DIC. The DIC ranks ahead of the other departments in protocol order and is also represented in the Party Standing Committee.

The units directly subordinate to HQ include:

==== Subordinated operational units ====
- PLAAF Airborne Corps
- Transport Regiment
- Special Missions Division

==== Subordinated research and training units ====
- 66th Blue Brigade
- Air Force Experimental Training Base (空军试验训练基地)
- Air Force Research Institute (空军研究院)
- Air Force Flight Experimental Training Base (飞行试验训练基地)
- Paratroopers Training Base (空降兵训练基地)

==== Subordinated academic units ====
- Air Force Command College
- Air Force Engineering University
- Air Force Aviation University
- Air Force Early Warning Academy
- Air Force Harbin Flight Academy
- Air Force Shijiazhuang Flight Academy
- Air Force Xi'an Flight Academy
- Air Force Medical University
- Air Force Logistics Academy
- Air Force Communication NCO Academy

=== Theater commands ===
Supreme command of the PLA is vested in the CMC. The CMC exercises control through the theater command headquarters to which the Theater Command Air Forces (TCAFs) are subordinated. TCAF headquarters have operational control over PLAAF units in the theater. The TCAF headquarters were created from the previous MRAF headquarters im early 2016.

TCAF headquarters have staff, political works, and support departments; the last combines the logistics and equipment management functions.

Each theater command has a PLAAF component. These and their headquarter locations are:

- Central Theatre Command Air Force (Beijing)
- Eastern Theater Command Air Force (Nanjing)
- Northern Theater Command Air Force (Shenyang)
- Southern Theater Command Air Force (Guangzhou)
- Western Theater Command Air Force (Chengdu)

=== Bases and command posts ===
Prior to their abolition, each military region had a Military Region Air Force (MRAF). The MRAF had multiple subordinate command organizations - the MRAF headquarters, "air corps", "command posts", and "bases" - and all could be directly assigned tactical units. The corps leader-grade air corps were primarily made up of staff. They did not necessarily have organic units and could be moved to control units in another area. The air corps were used to control air divisions. The corps leader-grade command posts were responsible for geographical areas. Bases were practically corps deputy leader-grade command posts. MRAF headquarters could act as command posts and typically had control of tactical aviation units in the provinces the headquarters was located in.

Initially, command posts were administrative organizations. In the 1980s, they became operational organizations. All but five air corps being converted into command posts. Some command posts administrative functions, duplicated in the MRAF and air corps, were removed. All the command posts, except for Lhasa, were downgraded into bases in 1993.

By 2004, the MRAFs had a total of five corps leader-grade air corps, six corps leader-grade bases, and three division leader-grade command posts. In 2004, the air corps and bases were converted into command posts, and all tactical units were subordinated directly to MRAF headquarters.

New corps deputy leader-grade bases began to be created in 2012 to control new division deputy leader-grade aviation brigades created by the abolishment or conversion of aviation divisions and regiments. In 2017, some bases were renamed as "air defense bases". By this time, no tactical units remained directly subordinated to MRAF or TCAF headquarters. In 2023, there were 12 bases and 3 command posts; it was not clear whether bases and command posts are in the chain of command or if TCAF headquarters have direct control over brigades.

Bases and command posts have a DIC, and staff, political works and support departments.

=== Operational units ===
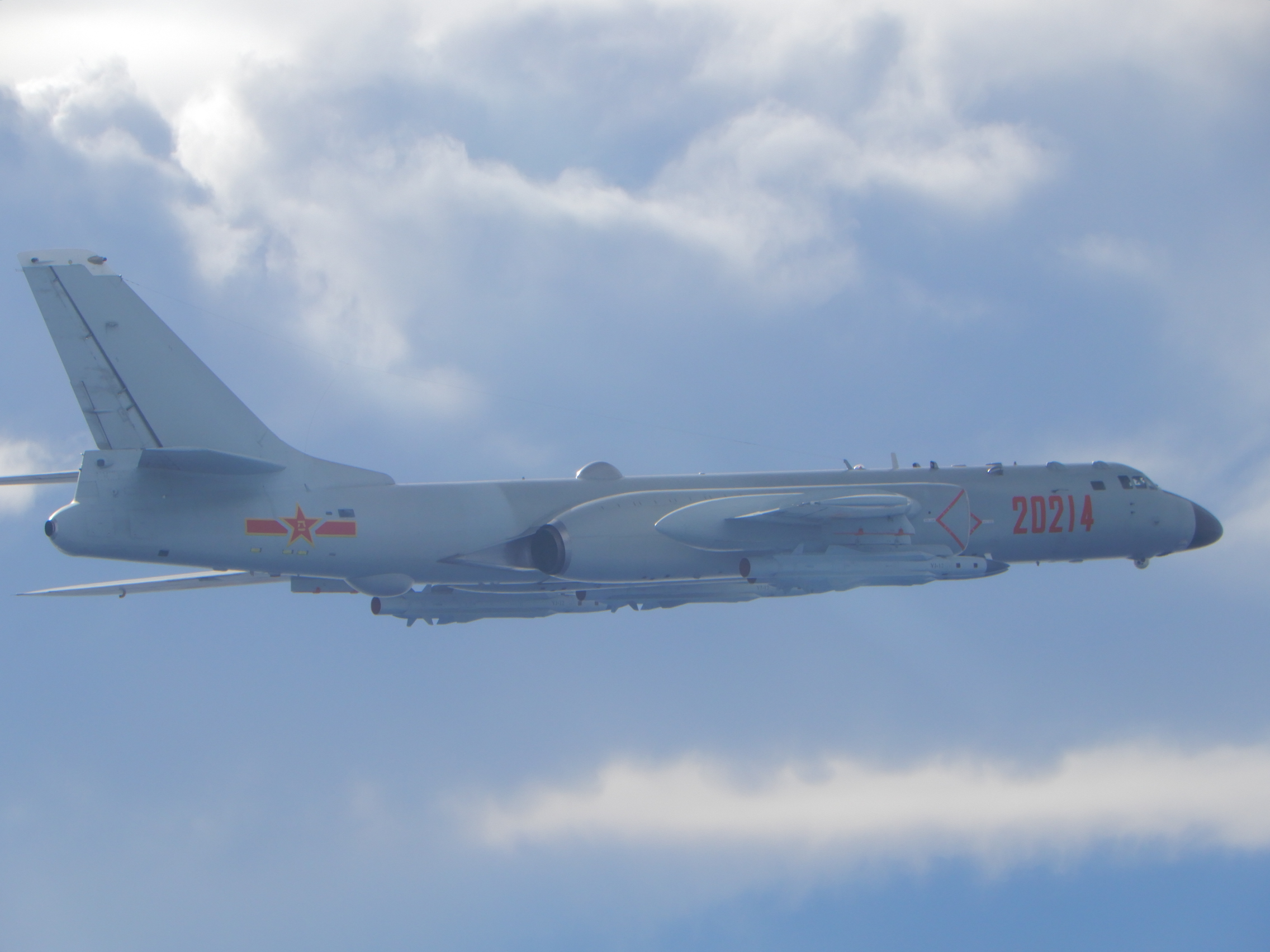
Xi'an H-6 Strategic bomber armed with YJ-12 supersonic anti-ship missiles

The early PLAAF used a hierarchy of air corps, air divisions, and air regiments.

Divisions were divided by role. Divisions had two regiments prior to 1953, after which they had three, including a training regiment. In the 1980s, each MRAF converted a division to a division leader-grade training base, and transferred the training regiments from operational division to the base. There were 50 divisions by the end of the 1980s. Divisions began to be discarded in the 2000s. By 2010, most divisions had two regiments. By 2017, there were nine divisions with subordinate regiments; these were for bombers, transports, and special mission aircraft, and were directly subordinated to PLAAF or TCAF headquarters instead of bases. Divisions have a regiment leader-grade "air station" responsible for logistics tasks.

Early regiments were divided into 3 or 4 battalion leader-grade dadui (Chinese: 大队) ("flight groups"), which were further subdivided into 3 or 4 company leader-grade zhongdui (Chinese: 中队) ("flight squadrons"). Fighter regiments had 24 aircraft and bomber regiments had 18. Regiments were called "groups" between 1964 and 1970 with no change in organization. Modern regiments have a battalion leader-grade maintenance group.

Division deputy leader-grade brigades began to be formed and subordinated to bases in 2011, with the process accelerating in 2016; this was part of the general conversion from the division-regiment structure to the base-brigade structure. In aviation units, this affected fighter and ground attack units. Brigades have 24 aircraft in three flight groups. Brigades were originally multifunctional with each flight group using a different type of aircraft. In 2018, this was changed to have a brigade equipped with closely related types of aircraft to improve efficiency and/or reduce the number of airframe-specific maintenance personnel required in each brigade. Brigades have an air station for logistics and a maintenance group.

Senior staff in divisions, brigades, and regiments have roles that mirror the DIC, staff, political, and support departments of higher echelons.

Divisions, brigades, and regiments are classified as "units" (部队), while every formation below regiment-size, from battalions to flights, is classified as a "subunit" (分队).

== Branches ==
=== Aviation Force ===
The initial force structure of the aviation forces was on a Corps-Division-Regiment-Group-Squad format. By 1971, the PLAAF had created a total of 50 air divisions. Each division was normally composed of two combat regiments and one training regiment. These 50 divisions remained in service until the end of the 1980s, when the first PLAAF force reductions took place. During the 2000s, the number of air divisions fell to 29, and then reduced to a mere 9 by 2017. Those 9 divisions are exclusively composed of long-range operating units, specifically bombers, transports, and special mission aircraft, and remain directly subordinate to the PLAAF HQ or the TCAF HQ rather than to a Base. Some service aircraft independent regiments also remain. All fighter and attack plane are as of 2025 organized into brigades, all subordinated to a Base, not to the TCAF HQ (with the exception of airlift and search and rescue brigades).

==== Aerobatic display team ====
The August 1st aerobatic team is the first PLAAF aerobatics team, established in 1962. It flies mostly the J-10 fighter, having recently (2023) upgraded to the J-10C version. It previously flew the J-5 and J-7. The Sky Wing and Red Falcon air demonstration teams, which operate Nanchang CJ-6 and Hongdu JL-8 respectively, were established in 2011.

=== Airborne Force Branch ===
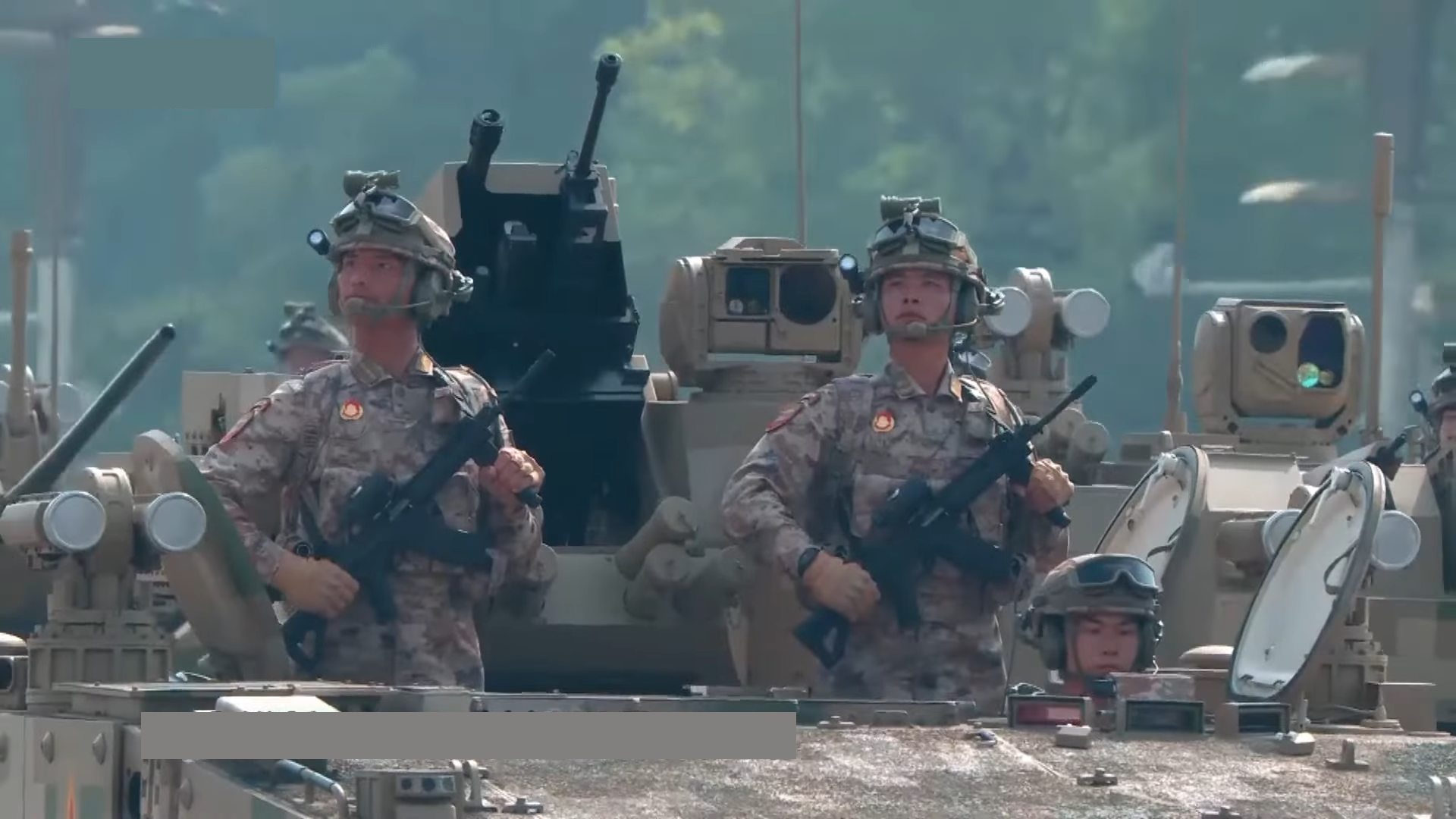
PLAAF Airborne Corps at the 2025 China Victory Day Parade

The Airborne Force (空降兵), which is also more commonly known the Airborne Corps (空降兵军) or the Airborne Troops, was created under the PLAAF in 1950. It did not become a formal branch until 1992, under the name of 15th Airborne Corps (空降兵第15军). In 2017 it was renamed into the plain unnumbered "Airborne Corps", with a corps grade, and placed under the direct subordinate control of the PLAAF HQ. The three airborne divisions were converted into six airborne brigades, an air assault brigade, a Special Forces brigade, an air transport brigade, a helicopter regiment, and a training base.

The Corps is a "rapid reaction unit" designed for air assault, airborne infiltration, long-range penetration, and special force missions in enemy rear areas. It practices airborne, air-mobile, and air-transportable missions.

=== Ground-to-Air Missile Force ===
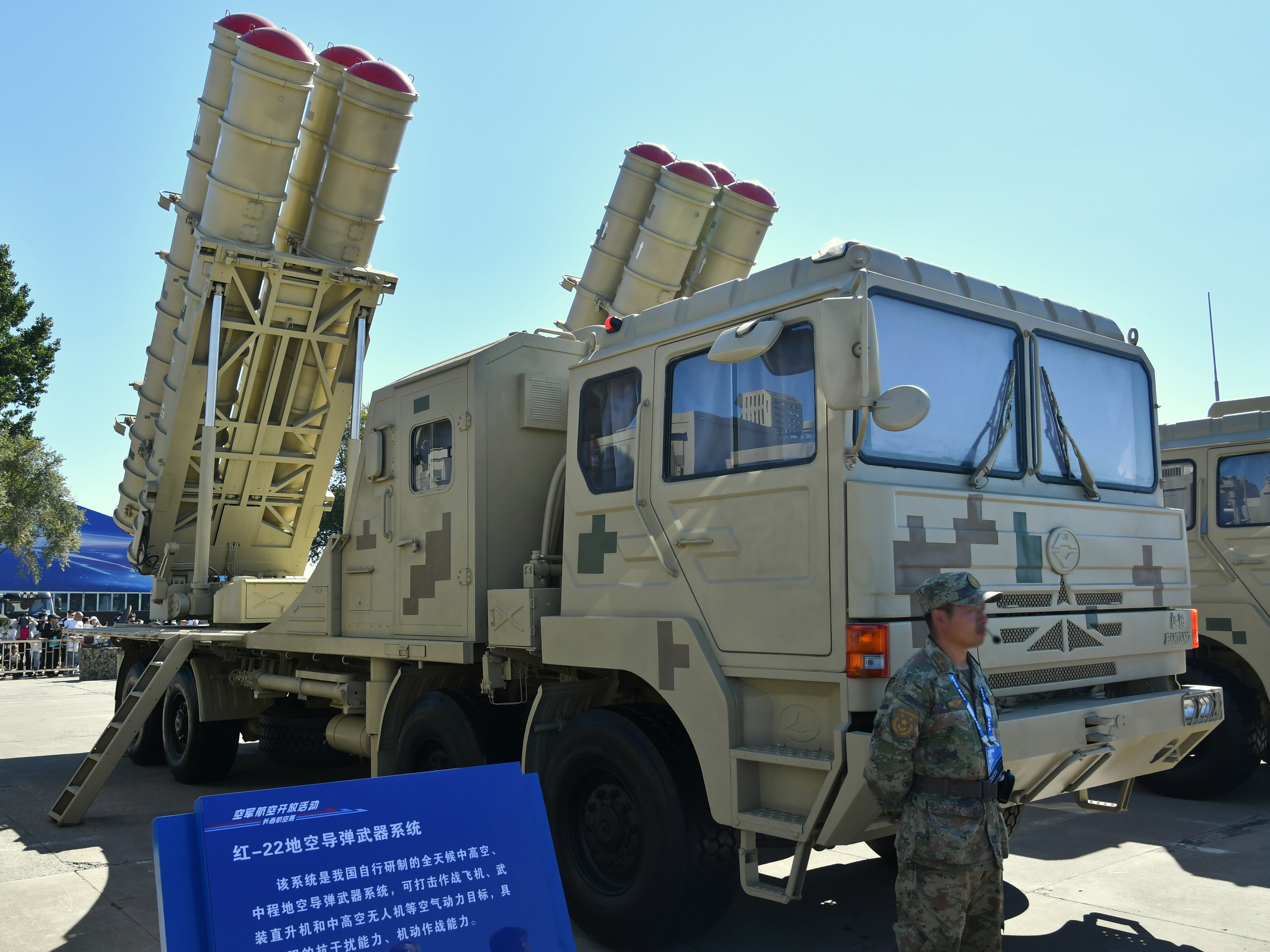
PLAAF HQ-22 surface-to-air missile (SAM) system

The Ground Air Defense Branch (地面防空兵) was the result of the merger of the former Surface-to-Air Missile (SAM/地空导弹兵) Branch and Antiaircraft Artillery (AAA/高射炮兵) Branch in approximately 2007, which it has identified in English as the Ground-to-Air Missile Branch (地面防空兵). Its subordinate units are identified as SAM (地空导弹/地导) divisions, brigades, and regiments (Note: only the Central TCAF (protecting Beijing) retain a division and its subordinate regiments, all other theater units have been made into brigades.), which are directly subordinate to the Bases, not the TCAF HQ.

After the 2023 reforms of the PLAN Aviation forces, the GADB received three air defense brigades from the PLAN (and the Radar Forces received three naval radar brigades), and simultaneously, it gained control over the air defense of Hainan, the Zhoushan to Wenzhou stretch of coast, and full command of the air defense for Shandong Province, meaning that for the first time it had complete responsibility for defending the entire coastal airspace of China.

=== Radar Forces ===
The first independent radar troop units were established in 1949. In 1950, radar units were divided into two types: 1) those subordinate to the Air Defense Department of the General Staff were responsible for early warning, and 2) those subordinate to the PLAAF were responsible for directly supporting aviation units. The Radar Troops were formally created in 1955 under the then independent PLA Air Defense Force (PLAADF). The radar troops became a formal branch (雷达兵) of the PLAAF in 1957, when the PLAAF and PLAADF merged.

The current (2025) PLAAF Radar Forces have three basic types of radar sites. The first type of sites are located at airfields and are used for air traffic control (ATC) and for vectoring pilots toward targets. The second type consists of the long-and medium-range radar picket line along China's borders, with an extensive network of radar stations mostly located on mountain tops (高山雷达站). The third type consists of over-the-horizon radars (OTHR—超视距雷达) based on the coastline or on islands (在海岛雷达站) that are used for early warning. The RF relationship with satellite-based early warning is unclear.

In the 2010s, all radar regiments were converted to brigades, each controlling a fairly large number of radar stations covering a wide geographical area. Today, each TCAF has one or several subordinate radar brigades, each with subordinate battalions, elements, and stations. The radar brigades, also identified as intelligence stations (情报站), are responsible for collecting, managing, and disseminating radar intelligence to all PLAAF field units. All radar brigades are now directly subordinate to Bases; however, some Bases also have directly subordinate company-level radar stations that are apparently not subordinate to a brigade.

Besides the surveillance network of long range, medium range, and short range radars (further categorized into low, medium, and high altitude), the PLAAF's aviation and SAM units have their own attached specialized (专业部队) radar units. These tend to be mobile units to diminish their vulnerability to enemy SEAD missions.

=== Electronic Countermeasures Branch ===
The PLAAF ECM (or electronic warfare) troops (电子对抗兵) were organized as an independent branch in 2009, being separated from the then joint Electronic Countermeasures and Radar Department (电子对抗雷达部). The PLAAF HQ most likely directly manages all ECM activities throughout the PLAAF.

=== Communications Corps ===
The PLAAF communication (or signals) units were raised into a branch ( 通信兵 ) in 2008. Today, the Communications Branch appears to be responsible for providing communications, navigation, and automated command support to the entire PLAAF, under the Staff Department's Information and Communications Bureau (信息通信局). All HQ units, PLAAF HQ, TCAF HQ, Base HQ, brigade, regiment and air station HQs have organic signals troops. Kenneth Allen points out that a high percentage of communications personnel are female.

The PLAAF HQ and each TCAF HQ has a regiment grade General Communications Station Center (通信总站中心) assigned to them, which are likely to also be their radar intelligence central station (雷达情报总站). Each TCAF seems to have subordinate several communications brigades. Communications regiments (通信团) are assigned to various organizations, such as the PLAAF HQ's Staff Department and the Airborne Corps HQ. Each Base Staff Department has its own subordinate Communications Station (通信站) and each Command Post has a communications battalion. Each brigade has subordinate battalions, elements, groups, companies, and/or stations depending on their missions and locations, often mobile facilities. The PLAAF HQ also has at least one subordinate communications training base (通信训练基地) located in Baoding.

== Airbases ==
The PLAAF has over 150 air bases distributed across each theater command.

== Equipment ==
The People's Liberation Army Air Force operates a large and varied fleet of some 4,000 aircraft, of which around 2,566 are combat aircraft (fighter, attack, and bombers). According to FlightGlobal, China has the second-largest active combat aircraft fleet and the third-largest total aircraft fleet in the world. In 2023, the PLANAF transferred the majority of its fixed-wing combat aircraft to the PLAAF, with the intent of simplifying logistics and focusing on carrier-based planes.

According to the International Institute for Strategic Studies, PLAAF combat pilots acquire an average of 100-150 flying hours annually.

According to the U.S. Department of the Air Force's China Aerospace Studies Institute (CASI) the PLAAF has a long history of developing UAVs, and continues to work on their development.

=== Air defense ===
The People's Liberation Army Air Force operates a multi-layered, integrated air defense system combining radar stations, electronic warfare systems, early warning and surveillance zones, and air-missile defense systems of various ranges.

Chinese air defense systems are highly distributed and mobile, in order to improve survivability against SEAD and DEAD missions.

Name	Origin	Type	Variant	In service	Notes
SAM
HQ-9	China	Long-range SAM	HQ-9/9B/9C	292+	derivative of the S-300 missile system
HQ-19	China	Long-range SAM		unknown	
HQ-20	China	Long-range SAM		unknown	
HQ-22	China	Long-range SAM	HQ-22/22A	130+	
HQ-29	China	Anti-ballistic missile		unknown	
S-300	Russia	Long-range SAM	S-300PMU/U1/U2	216	
S-400	Russia	Long-range SAM		32	
HQ-12	China	Medium-range SAM		150	
HQ-6	China	Short-range SAM	HQ-6A/6D	74+	
HQ-11	China	Short-range SAM		4+	
Anti-aircraft gun
AZP S-60	Soviet Union	Anti-aircraft autocannon	PG-59		

== See also ==
- List of historic aircraft of the People's Liberation Army Air Force
- People's Liberation Army Naval Air Force
- People's Liberation Army Ground Force
- List of aircraft produced by China
- List of Chinese aircraft engines
- People's Liberation Army Air Force Airborne Corps
