= 2015 Dongying explosion =

Fatal explosion in Dongying, Shandong, China

- Date: 31 August 2015
- Time: ~23:22 CST (~15:30 UTC) onwards
- Venue: Chemical factory
- Location: Dongying, Shandong, China
- Type: Explosion, fire
- Cause: Under investigation
- Deaths: 13
- Injuries: 25

The 2015 Dongying explosion was an explosion that occurred at the Diao Kou Xiang Bin Yuan Chemical Co. located within the Dongying Economic Development Zone in Dongying, Shandong, China, on Monday, 31 August 2015 and killed thirteen people.

== Events ==
At 11:22pm on 31 August 2015, a chemical factory in the Dongyin-Lijin Binhai Economic and Technological Development Zone in eastern China exploded. The ensuing fire took five hours to bring under control. Chinese authorities detained 12 company employees and executives and 11 government officials. One person was reported to have been killed in the explosion, however the death toll later rose to 13 with 25 others injured. The blast came just three weeks after the Tianjin disaster which garnered significant media coverage.

== See also ==
- 2015 Tianjin explosions
- 2014 Kunshan explosion
- 1988 PEPCON disaster
- Largest artificial non-nuclear explosions
- List of accidents and disasters by death toll
