= Zhang Jianping =

Chinese politician

- 张建平

Deputy Commander of the PLA Air Force
- Incumbent
- Assumed office April 2013 Serving with Chen Dong, Zheng Qunliang, Zhang Honghe
- Commander: Ma Xiaotian

Commander of the Guangzhou Military Region Air Force
- In office July 2011 – April 2013
- Preceded by: Gao Shouwei
- Succeeded by: Xu Anxiang

Commander of the Jinan Military Region Air Force
- In office January 2011 – July 2011
- Preceded by: Liu Zhongxing
- Succeeded by: Zheng Qunliang

Personal details
- Born: April 1956 (age 69–70) Sha County, Fujian, China
- Party: Chinese Communist Party

Military service
- Allegiance: China
- Branch/service: People's Liberation Army Air Force
- Years of service: 1974 – present
- Rank: Lieutenant General

Zhang Jianping (Chinese: 张建平; born April 1956) is a lieutenant general (zhong jiang) of the People's Liberation Army Air Force (PLAAF) of China. He has been deputy commander of the PLAAF since 2013, and previously served as commander of the Jinan Military Region Air Force and the Guangzhou Military Region Air Force.

== Biography ==
Zhang Jianping was born in April 1956 in Sha County, Fujian Province. He enlisted in the PLAAF in 1974.

Zhang was regimental commander at the age of 27 and commander of the 3rd Fighter Division a few years later (the elite of all elite divisions in the PLAAF). Being the first "fist unit" equipped with the Su-27 in the mid-1990s, he led the first team from the division to Russia to receive the Su–27 and become the first of the Su–27 pilot cadre in the PLAAF. He was promoted to be commander of the 9th Corps and deputy commander of the Beijing Military Region Air Force.

He was then transferred to the PLAAF headquarters as first deputy chief of staff. He assisted the chief of staff Yang Guohai, overseeing operations and training. In July 2009, he was the PLAAF representative in the Sino-Russian joint military exercise Peace Mission 2009 at Zhaonan Joint Tactical Training Base in the Jinan Military Region. After the exercise, he made a widely circulated speech on how the PLAAF should learn the best air force theory and practices of the foreign counterparts.

In January 2011, Zhang was promoted to commander of the Jinan Military Region Air Force and concurrently deputy commander of the Jinan MR. Six months later, he was transferred to the Guangzhou Military Region, serving the same positions. In April 2013, he was appointed deputy commander of the PLAAF.

Zhang attained the rank of major general in February 2003, and lieutenant general in July 2012. He was an alternate of the 18th Central Committee of the Chinese Communist Party.
