= Ding Laihang =

Chinese military officer

Air Force General Ding Laihang
- 丁来杭
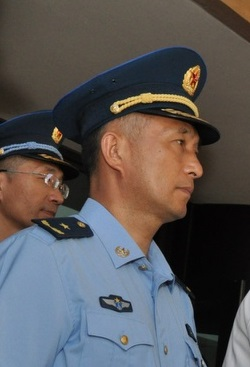
- Ding in 2009

12th Commander of the People's Liberation Army Air Force
- In office August 2017 – September 2021
- Preceded by: Ma Xiaotian
- Succeeded by: Chang Dingqiu

Commander of the Northern Theater Command Air Force
- In office February 2016 – August 2017
- Preceded by: New position
- Succeeded by: Xu Xueqiang

Commander of the Shenyang Military Region Air Force
- In office August 2012 – January 2016
- Preceded by: Zhou Laiqiang
- Succeeded by: Position abolished

Personal details
- Born: September 1957 (age 68) Hangzhou, Zhejiang, China
- Party: Chinese Communist Party

Military service
- Allegiance: China
- Branch/service: People's Liberation Army Air Force
- Years of service: ?–2021
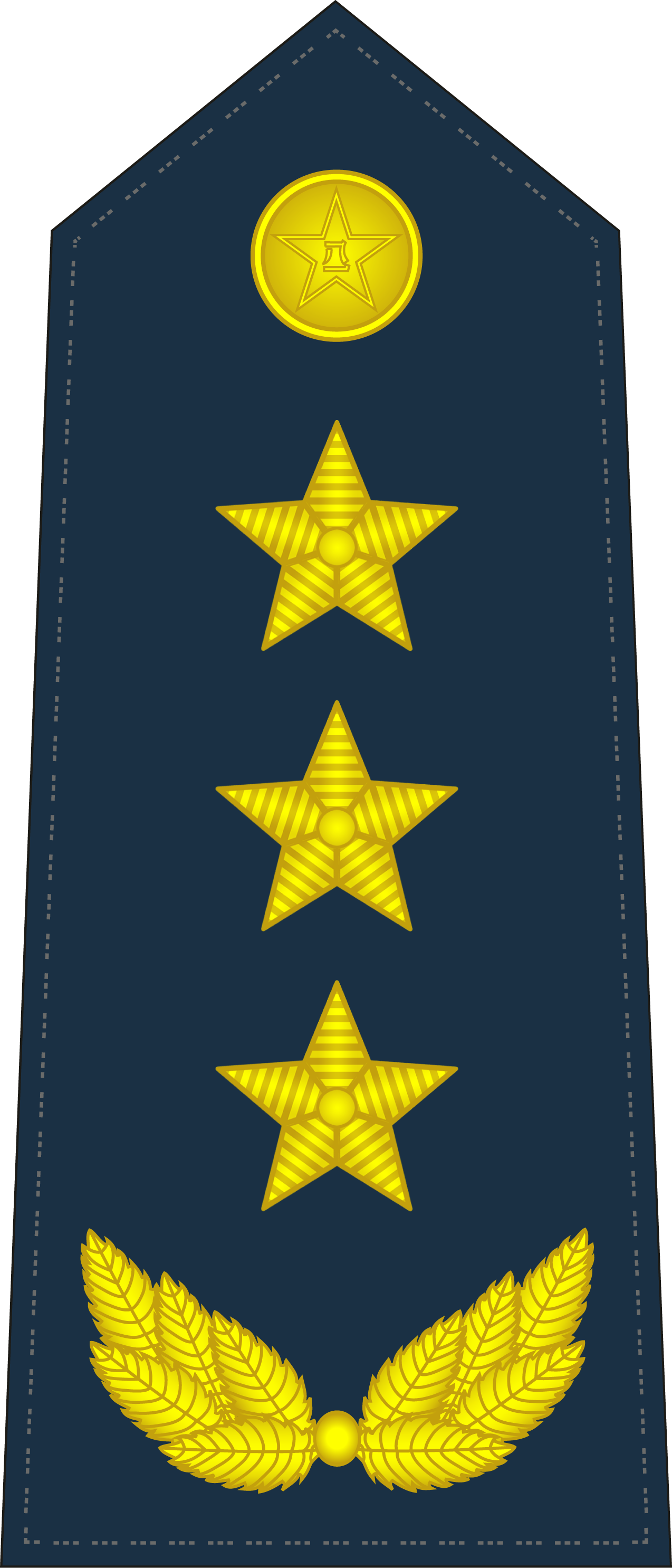
- Rank: Air Force General
- Commands: People's Liberation Army Air Force; Northern Theater Command Air Force; Shenyang Military Region Air Force

Chinese name
- Simplified Chinese: 丁来杭
- Traditional Chinese: 丁來杭
Transcriptions
Standard Mandarin
- Hanyu Pinyin: Dīng Láiháng
Wu
- Wugniu: Tin^{1} Le^{2}-ghan^{2}

Ding Laihang (Chinese: 丁来杭; born September 1957) is a general of the Chinese People's Liberation Army Air Force (PLAAF) who served as Commander of People's Liberation Army Air Force from 2017 to 2021. Prior to that, he was commander of the Shenyang Military Region Air Force and then commander of the Northern Theater Command Air Force.

== Biography ==
Ding was born in September 1957 in Hangzhou, Zhejiang. He became regimental commander of Regiment 71 of 24th Fighter Aviation Division while in his early 30s. From the position of division deputy commander he moved to command of a training base in the Beijing Military Region Air Force, a divisional unit. Like Ma Zhenjun, he emphasized combat-realistic "Red versus Blue" training.

In 2001, he was swiftly promoted to chief of staff of the 8th Corps, deployed on the Taiwan Front, reaching the deputy corps level at the age of 44. When the 8th Corps was reorganized down to the Fuzhou Forward Commanding Post in 2003, Ding was its founding head. In 2007 he was promoted to be president of PLA Air Force Command Academy. A year later he was transferred to the Chengdu Military Region Air Force as its chief of staff. Ding was one of the youngest senior officers among the seven PLAAF Military Regions (at the full corps rank).

In August 2012, Ding was promoted to commander of the Shenyang Military Region Air Force, as well as Deputy Commander of the Shenyang MR. In February 2016, he was appointed the inaugural Air Force commander and deputy commander of the Northern Theater Command, which was newly established in Xi Jinping's military reform. In August 2017, he was promoted to commander of the PLA Air Force, succeeding General Ma Xiaotian.

Ding attained the rank of major general in July 2003, and lieutenant general (zhong jiang) in July 2013. He was a member of the 11th National People's Congress. In October 2017, he was elected as a member of the 19th Central Committee of the Chinese Communist Party. On 31 July 2019 he was promoted to General.

=== Dismissal ===
In November 2023, Ding was put under investigation for a corruption case involving the construction of Beijing Xijiao Airport. On December 4, he was dismissed from his position as a representative of the 14th National People's Congress on suspicion of "serious violations of discipline and law".

Military offices
Preceded by Yu Changhai	Commander of Fuzhou Forward Commanding Post; 2003–2007	Succeeded by Huang Guoxian
Preceded by Yi Xiaoguang	President of PLA Air Force Command College; 2007–2008	Succeeded by Ma Jian
Preceded by Zhou Laiqiang	Commander of the Shenyang Military Region Air Force; 2012–2016	Succeeded by Position revoked
New title	Commander of Northern Theater Command Air Force; 2016–2017	Succeeded by Xu Xueqiang
Preceded by Ma Xiaotian	Commander of People's Liberation Army Air Force; 2017–2021	Succeeded by Chang Dingqiu
