= Zhang Yihu =

Lieutenant general of the People's Liberation Army Air Force

- 张义瑚

Commander of the Lanzhou Military Region Air Force
- In office July 2013 – January 2016
- Preceded by: Zhuang Kezhu
- Succeeded by: Position abolished

Personal details
- Born: 1962 (age 63–64) Lianyungang, Jiangsu, China
- Party: Chinese Communist Party

Military service
- Allegiance: Chinese Communist Party
- Branch/service: People's Liberation Army Air Force
- Years of service: 1980–present
- Rank: Lieutenant General

Zhang Yihu (Chinese: 张义瑚; born 1962) is a lieutenant general (zhong jiang) of the People's Liberation Army Air Force (PLAAF) of China. He has served as deputy commander of the Central Theater Command since 2016. He formerly served as commander of the Lanzhou Military Region Air Force and deputy commander of the Lanzhou MR.

== Biography ==
Zhang Yihu was born in 1962 in Lianyungang, Jiangsu Province. He enlisted in the PLAAF in 1980, serving in the Nanjing Military Region Air Force. He rose to a regimental leader in the 3rd Fighter Division of the PLAAF, and was the commander of the air force squad in the 1999 Chinese National Day Parade.

In 2002, Zhang became commander of the 33rd Fighter Division. He was promoted to deputy chief of staff of the Chengdu Military Region Air Force in July 2008, and assistant chief of staff of the PLAAF a year later. He was then appointed chief of staff of the Lanzhou Military Region Air Force (MRAF) in July 2010, and chief of staff of the Beijing Military Region Air Force in May 2011. In July 2013, he was promoted to commander of the Lanzhou MRAF and deputy commander of the Lanzhou MR.

In January 2016, Zhang was appointed deputy commander of the newly established Central Theater Command.

Zhang attained the rank of major general in July 2009 and lieutenant general on 16 July 2014. He was one of the youngest lieutenant generals in the PLAAF, along with Ma Zhenjun and Huang Guoxian.
