= Yi Xiaoguang =

Air Force General Yi Xiaoguang
- 乙晓光
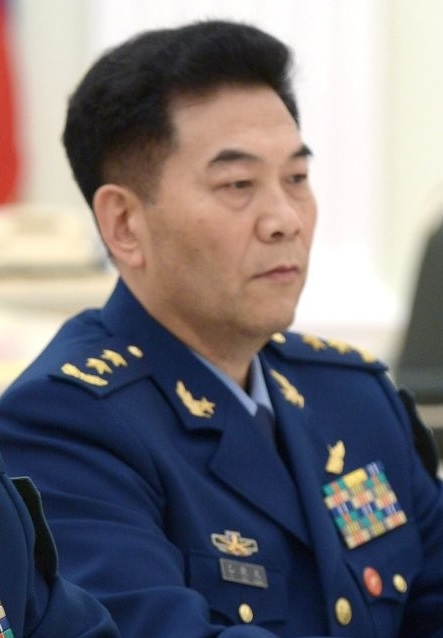
- Yi Xiaoguang during a meeting with the Russian president, Moscow, 2015

Commander of the Central Theater Command
- In office August 2017 – August 2021
- Preceded by: Han Weiguo
- Succeeded by: Lin Xiangyang

Deputy Chief of Joint Staff
- In office July 2014 – August 2017
- Chief: Fang Fenghui

Commander of the Nanjing Military Region Air Force
- In office December 2010 – December 2012
- Preceded by: Jiang Jianzeng
- Succeeded by: Zheng Qunliang

Personal details
- Born: June 1958 (age 68) Shuyang County, Suqian, Jiangsu, China
- Party: Chinese Communist Party
- Education: PLA Air Force Command Academy

Military service
- Allegiance: People's Republic of China
- Branch/service: People's Liberation Army Air Force
- Years of service: 1974–Present
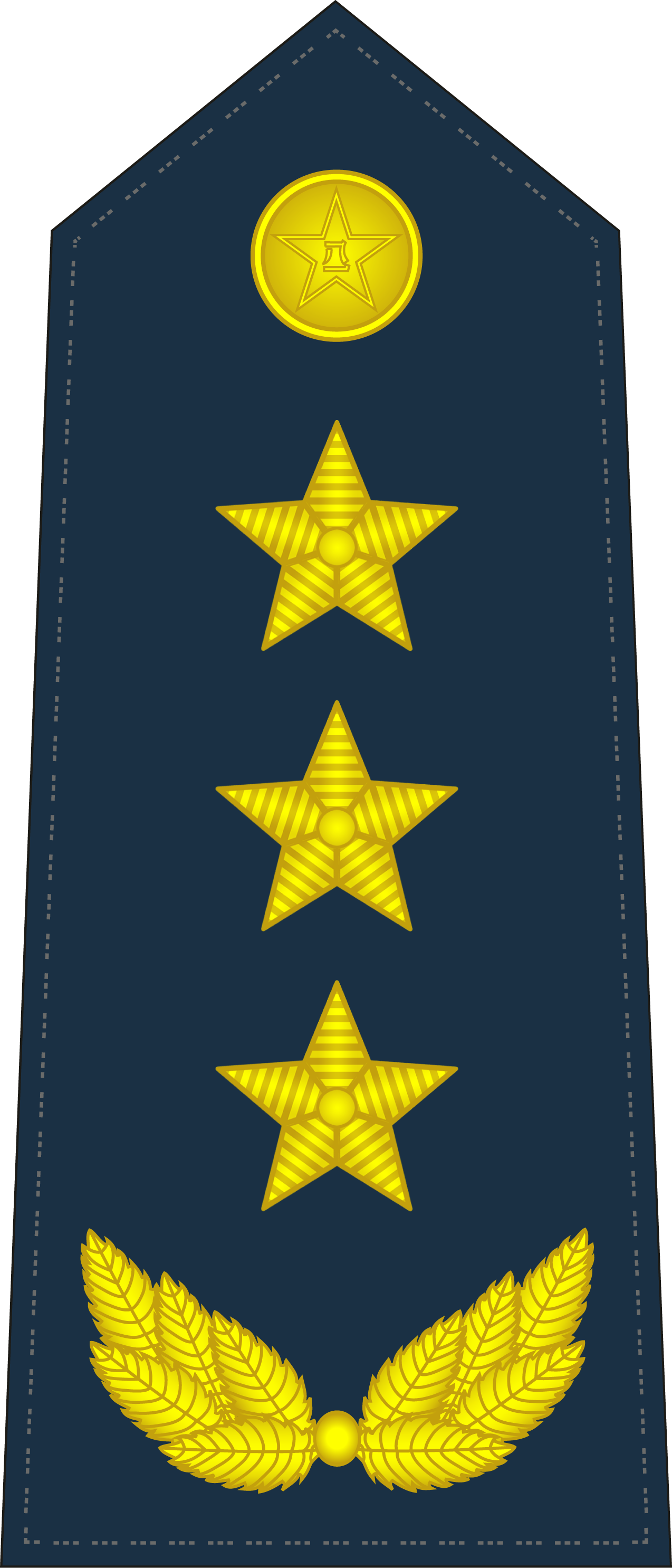
- Rank: Air Force General

Chinese name
- Simplified Chinese: 乙晓光
- Traditional Chinese: 乙曉光
Transcriptions
Standard Mandarin
- Hanyu Pinyin: Yǐ Xiǎoguāng

Yi Xiaoguang (Chinese: 乙晓光; born June 1958) is a general of the Chinese People's Liberation Army Air Force (PLAAF) who served as commander of the Central Theater Command from 2017 to 2021. Previously he served as President of the Air Force Command Academy, Commander of the Nanjing Military Region Air Force, and Deputy Chief of the Joint Staff. He is a member of the 19th Central Committee of the Chinese Communist Party.

== Biography ==
Yi Xiaoguang was born into a military family in Shuyang County, Suqian, Jiangsu Province. He joined the PLAAF in 1974 at the age of 16, studied at the Baoding Aviation School for a year, and became a battalion commander three years later at the age of 20. He entered the famous PLA Air Force Command Academy in Haidian, Beijing in 1984, laying the foundation for his subsequent "helicopter rise." He reached the post of deputy division commander in 1989 at the age of 31 and division command in 1992, director of the Department of Training in the PLAAF Headquarters in 1996 (the youngest grade-two department head at the time), and deputy chief of staff of Guangzhou Military Region Air Force in 2002.

Yi served as president of the PLA Air Force Command Academy (AFCA) from 2004 to 2008. In PLA tradition, it is relatively easy to find a capable corps commander, but very difficult to locate a capable president for a top military university. When he was divisional commander in 1992, Yi wrote The Chinese/English Manual for Jet Pilots, unique for a combat pilot with no formal higher education and an achievement helpful for his appointment to the presidency of the AFCA. In 2003, Yi Xiaoguang and Sun Herong co-authored the highly acclaimed book The Stealth Aircraft: A Difficult Adversary (《隐形飞机及其克星》ISBN 9787801721099). The book proved popular with the PLAAF, then in the midst of examining high-tech warfare.

In 2008 Yi was brought back to the PLAAF headquarters as deputy chief of staff. In December 2010, he was appointed commander of the Nanjing Military Region Air Force. In December 2012, he was named assistant to the Chief of Joint Staff, before getting promoted to Deputy Chief of Joint Staff in July 2014. In August 2017, Yi was appointed Commander of the Central Theater Command, replacing Han Weiguo.

Yi attained the rank of major general in July 2001, and lieutenant general in July 2012. He was promoted to general in July 2016; at the time of his promotion, Yi, 58, was the youngest full general in all branches of the PLA. He was an alternate of the 18th Central Committee of the Chinese Communist Party, ranking 166 out of 168 alternates (based on votes in favour at the Party Congress). In October 2017, he was elected as a member of the 19th Central Committee of the Chinese Communist Party.

Military offices
Preceded by Liu Guangzhi	President of PLA Air Force Command College; 2004–2008	Succeeded by Ding Laihang
Preceded by Jiang Jianzeng	Commander of the Nanjing Military Region Air Force; 2010–2012	Succeeded by Zheng Qunliang
Preceded by Han Weiguo	Commander of the Central Theater Command; 2017–2021	Succeeded by Lin Xiangyang
