= Chen Dong (general) =

Chinese general

- 陈东

Deputy Commander of the PLA Air Force
- Incumbent
- Assumed office 2012 Serving with Zhang Jianping, Zheng Qunliang, Zhang Honghe
- Commander: Ma Xiaotian

Personal details
- Party: Chinese Communist Party

Military service
- Allegiance: China
- Branch/service: People's Liberation Army Air Force
- Rank: Lieutenant General

Chen Dong (Chinese: 陈东) is a lieutenant general (zhong jiang) of the People's Liberation Army Air Force (PLAAF) of China. He has been Deputy Commander of the PLAAF since late 2012. He formerly served as Director of the Electronic Warfare Department (Department 5) of the PLA General Staff Department. He was elevated to the rank of lieutenant general on 16 July 2014.

He was one of the six lieutenant generals of the PLA who participated in the 2015 China Victory Day Parade, the first time in PRC history that military parade squads were led by officers ranked as high as lieutenant generals.
