= Huang Guoxian =

Chinese general

- 黄国显
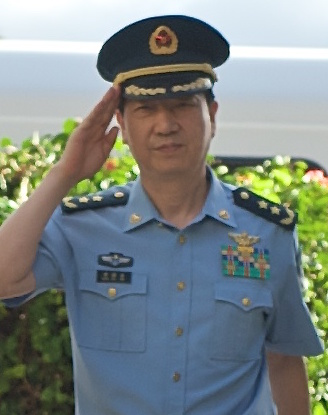
- Huang Guoxian in Pearl Harbor, September 2014

Commander of the Eastern Theater Command Air Force
- In office February 2016 – June 2016
- Preceded by: Position established

Commander of the Nanjing Military Region Air Force
- In office July 2013 – January 2016
- Preceded by: Zheng Qunliang
- Succeeded by: Position abolished

Personal details
- Born: April 1962 (age 63–64) Henan, China
- Party: Chinese Communist Party

Military service
- Allegiance: China
- Branch/service: People's Liberation Army Air Force
- Years of service: ? – present
- Rank: Lieutenant General

Huang Guoxian (Chinese: 黄国显; born April 1962) is a lieutenant general of the Chinese People's Liberation Army Air Force (PLAAF). He has served as the inaugural Commander of the Eastern Theater Command Air Force since its establishment in February 2016. Prior to that, he was Commander of the Nanjing Military Region Air Force and Deputy Commander of the Nanjing MR from 2013 to 2016.

== Biography ==
Huang Guoxian was born in April 1962 in Henan Province. He spent much of his career in the Chengdu Military Region Air Force, before being appointed Commander of the PLAAF Fuzhou Forward Headquarters in August 2005. In 2011, he succeeded Xu Anxiang as Chief of Staff of the Nanjing Military Region Air Force. In July 2013, he was promoted to Commander of the Nanjing MRAF, as well as Deputy Commander of the Nanjing MR, replacing Zheng Qunliang. In February 2016, during Central Military Commission chairman Xi Jinping's military reform, Huang was appointed the Air Force Commander of the newly established PLA Eastern Theater Command.

Huang attained the rank of major general in 2011, and was elevated to the rank of lieutenant general (zhong jiang) on 16 July 2014. He was one of the youngest lieutenant generals in the PLAAF, along with Ma Zhenjun and Zhang Yihu.

In September 2014, Huang and a delegation of PLAAF officers visited Joint Base Pearl Harbor–Hickam in Hawaii, as part of a reciprocal visit to building a strong military to military relationship between the United States and China. He was hosted by General Hawk Carlisle, Pacific Air Forces commander.
