= Zheng Qunliang =

Chinese Air Force general

- 郑群良
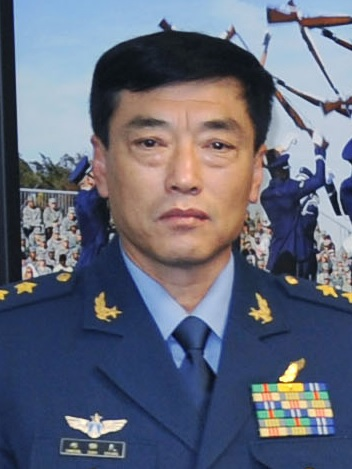
- Zheng in 2012

Deputy Commander of the PLA Air Force
- Incumbent
- Assumed office July 2013 Serving with Zhang Jianping, Chen Dong, Zhang Honghe
- Commander: Ma Xiaotian

Commander of the Nanjing Military Region Air Force
- In office December 2012 – July 2013
- Preceded by: Yi Xiaoguang
- Succeeded by: Huang Guoxian

Commander of the Jinan Military Region Air Force
- In office July 2011 – December 2012
- Preceded by: Zhang Jianping
- Succeeded by: Sun Herong

Personal details
- Born: January 1954 (age 72) Wafangdian, Liaoning, China
- Party: Chinese Communist Party
- Education: PLA Air Force Command Academy

Military service
- Allegiance: China
- Branch/service: People's Liberation Army Air Force
- Years of service: 1970 – present
- Rank: Lieutenant General

Zheng Qunliang (Chinese: 郑群良; born January 1954) is a lieutenant general (zhong jiang) of the People's Liberation Army Air Force (PLAAF) of China. He has served as Deputy Commander of the PLAAF since 2013 and previously as Commander of the Jinan Military Region Air Force and the Nanjing Military Region Air Force.

== Biography ==
Zheng Qunliang was born in January 1954 in Wafangdian, Liaoning Province. He joined the People's Liberation Army (PLA) in March 1970. He served in the 41st division of the PLA Ground Force until 1974, when he entered PLAAF No. 5 Aviation Academy. He joined the Air Force upon graduation in 1977. From 1984 to 1986 he studied at the PLA Air Force Command Academy.

Zheng is a top-grade jet fighter pilot. When he reached the PLAAF's compulsory non-flight age of 47, he had accumulated 2,200 flying hours. He became commander of Regiment 3 of the 1st Division in 1992, then division commander in 1997. In a transregional combat drill under no pre-set flying conditions, he led the division to a deployment at another air base, breaking PLA records for the largest number of aircraft moved on a single mission, traveling the longest distance, and the longest flying time under instrument only (blind flying) flight conditions. In 1999 he was the in-flight commander for the Air Force National Day Military Parade. The review formation was 7 kilometres (4.3 mi) long, and passed the review stand at Tiananmen Square exactly on time, to the second. This exhibition won him high praise from PLAAF leaders. In 2002 he was promoted to commander of the Wuhan Air Base.

He was named Chief of Staff of the Shenyang Military Region Air Force in February 2008, Deputy MRAF Commander in December 2010, and concurrently MRAF Commander and Deputy MR Commander in July 2011. In December 2012, he was transferred to the Nanjing Military Region Air Force to serve in the same concurrent positions. In July 2013, he was appointed Deputy Commander of the PLAAF.

Zheng attained the rank of major general in July 2005, and lieutenant general in July 2012. In November 2012, he was elected an alternate of the 18th Central Committee of the Chinese Communist Party.

== Visit to the United States ==
As commander of the PLAAF's elite 1st Fighter Division, Zheng was selected to participate in a PLA senior officers' delegation to visit the United States in July 2000, a sign that the PLA had identified him as a future leader in the air force. After his trip, he wrote a widely distributed article recounting his experiences visiting various U.S. Air Force bases.
