= Tibet Gaozheng Explosives =

Chinese state-owned company

- Company type: Public; partly state-owned
- Founded: 2002; 24 years ago

Tibet Gaozheng Civil Explosives (Chinese: 西藏高争民爆股份) or Tibet Gaozheng Explosives, Tibet Gaozheng Civil Explosives Co., Ltd. was founded on January 2, 2014, through the complete transformation of the former Tibet Gaozheng Civil Explosives Materials Limited Liability Company into a state-controlled enterprise in the Tibet Autonomous Region, specializing in the production, sales, transportation, and storage of civil explosives and possessing blasting qualifications. The company is situated at No. 18, Area A, Linqionggang Road, Lhasa, Lhasa Economic Development Zone, and its registered trademark is "Moving the Mountain"(Chinese: 移山). The primary commercial activities of the corporation encompass the manufacturing, sale, storage, and transportation of civil explosives and hazardous materials.

== History ==
The company was formally listed on the SME board of the Shenzhen Stock Exchange on December 9, 2016, designated as "Gaozheng Civil Explosives." (Chinese: 高争民爆, SZSE: 002827) By the conclusion of 2017, the company's total assets reached 895 million yuan. It is a holding entity under the State-owned Assets Supervision and Administration Commission of the Tibet Autonomous Region, with 68.37% ownership by Tibet Gaozheng Explosive Engineering Co. The company's sales territory encompasses the entire region of Tibet, specifically including Lhasa City, Shigatse, Shannan City, Nyingchi, Chamdo City, Nagqu, Ali, and more sales branches.
