= National Economic and Technological Development Zones =

Zones in China for foreign direct investment

- Simplified Chinese: 国家级经济技术开发区
- Traditional Chinese: 國家級經濟技術開發區
Transcriptions
Standard Mandarin
- Hanyu Pinyin: Guójiājí Jīngjì Jìshù Kāifā Qū

The National Economic and Technological Development Zones (simplified Chinese: 国家级经济技术开发区; traditional Chinese: 國家級經濟技術開發區; pinyin: Guójiājí Jīngjì Jìshù Kāifā Qū) are the special areas of the People's Republic of China where foreign direct investment is encouraged. They are usually called the "Economic and Technological Development Zones" or simply the "Development Zones" (开发区; Kāifā Qū).

These national level programs started with the Special Economic Zones for three cities in 1978, as part of the reform and opening up, and were extended to the Economic and Technological Development Zones in 14 cities in 1984.

== List of zones ==
In 2006, there were 49 Development Zones. A list of Development Zones is below:

- Dalian Development Area
- Haining
- Qinhuangdao
- Tianjin Economic-Technological Development Area
- Yantai
- Qingdao
- Nantong
- Lianyungang
- Weihai
- Fuqing Rongqiao
- Tongshan
- Shenyang
- Harbin
- Changchun
- Wuhan
- Wuhu
- Huizhou Dayawan
- Beijing
- Ürümqi
- Hefei
- Zhengzhou
- Xi'an
- Chengdu
- Kunming
- Changsha Economic and Technological Development Zone
- Guiyang
- Nanchang
- Hohhot
- Yinchuan
- Nanjing
- Suzhou Industrial Park
- Shanghai Minhang
- Shanghai Hongqiao
- Shanghai Caohejing Development Zone (Shanghai Metro)
- Shanghai Pudong Lujiazui Financial & Trading Zone
- Shanghai Pudong Waigaiqiao Free-Trade Zone
- Shanghai Pudong Jinqiao Export Manufacturing Zone
- Shanghai Pudong Zhangjiang Hi-Tech Park
- Hangzhou
- Hangzhou Xiangshan
- Ningbo
- Ningbo Daxie Island
- Wenzhou
- Fuzhou Mawei District
- Xiamen Haicang District
- Guangzhou
- Guangzhou Nansha
- Zhanjiang
- Hainan Yangpu Economic Development Zone
- Xining
- Taiyuan
- Lhasa - Lhasa Economic and Technological Development Zone
- Nanning
- Lanzhou
- Shuyang Shuyang Economic and Technological Development Zone
- Langfang

== Provincial Economic Development Zones ==
There are now many Provincial Economic Development Zones, such as:

- Dalian Changxing Island Seaport Industrial Area (Liaoning)
- Dongying Economic Development Zone (Shandong)
- Yunmeng County Economic Development Zone, Xiaogan, Hubei
- Hanchuan Economic and Technological Development Zone (汉川市经济技术开发区), Xiaogan, Hubei
- Jingzhou Economic and Technological Development Zone, Jingzhou, Hubei
- Aksu City Economic and Technological Development Zone

Some of them are as large as the National Economic and Technological Development Zones. There are also the Municipal-Level Economic Development Zones.

== See also ==
- List of economic and technological development zones in Beijing
- List of economic and technological development zones in Shanghai
- List of technology centers of the world
- Megalopolises in China
- Special economic zone
- Special economic zones of China
