= Zhang Honghe =

Chinese lieutenant general

- 张洪贺

Deputy Commander of the PLA Air Force
- Incumbent
- Assumed office 2013 Serving with Zhang Jianping, Chen Dong, Zheng Qunliang
- Commander: Ma Xiaotian

Personal details
- Born: November 1954 (age 71) Fuyang, Anhui, China
- Party: Chinese Communist Party

Military service
- Allegiance: China
- Branch/service: People's Liberation Army Air Force
- Rank: Air Force Lieutenant General

Zhang Honghe (Chinese: 张洪贺) is a lieutenant general (zhong jiang) and Deputy Commander of China's People's Liberation Army Air Force (PLAAF). He was elevated to the rank of air force lieutenant general on 16 July 2014. He formerly served as President of the PLA Air Force Engineering University (AFEU) in Xi'an, which is under the jurisdiction of the Ministry of National Defense.
