= Tongyang, Jiangsu =

Tongyang 潼阳镇
- Town
- Interactive map of Tongyang
- Coordinates: 34°16′15″N 118°37′14″E
- Country: People's Republic of China
- Province: Jiangsu
- Prefecture-level city: Suqian
- County: Shuyang

Area
  - Total: 100.69 km^{2} (38.88 sq mi)
- Elevation: 12 m (39 ft)

Population
  - Total: 47,500
  - Density: 472/km^{2} (1,220/sq mi)
- Time zone: UTC+8 (China Standard)
- Website: http://www.shuyang.gov.cn/shuyangtyz/

Tongyang (simplified Chinese: 潼阳; traditional Chinese: 潼陽; pinyin: Tóngyáng) is a town of Shuyang County in northwestern Jiangsu province, China, and is directly served by China National Highway 205. The town, which has 47,500 residents now, was also known as Yinping Town before 2000.

== Administrative divisions ==
Tongyang town has 2 neighborhoods and 13 villages:

- Yinping Neighborhood
- Tongdong Neighborhood
- Tongbei Village
- Tongxi Village
- Tongnan Village
- Caocun Village
- Maling Village
- Chaoyang Village
- Zhouzhuang Village
- Wutan Village
- Dazhai Village
- Houtun Village
- Zhabu Village
- Yaozhuang Village
- Shanyang Village
