= Zhou Laiqiang =

Chinese military officer

- 周来强

Commander of the Shenyang Military Region Air Force
- In office July 2004 – August 2012
- Preceded by: Xu Qiliang
- Succeeded by: Ding Laihang

Personal details
- Born: 1949 (age 76–77) Huai'an, Jiangsu, China
- Party: Chinese Communist Party

Military service
- Allegiance: China
- Branch/service: People's Liberation Army Air Force
- Rank: Air Force Lieutenant General

Zhou Laiqiang (Chinese: 周来强; born 1949) is a retired lieutenant general (zhong jiang) of the People's Liberation Army Air Force (PLAAF) of China. He served as commander of the Shenyang Military Region Air Force and concurrently deputy commander of the Shenyang MR from 2004 to 2012. He was appointed deputy commander of the PLAAF in July 2012, replacing Jing Wenchun who had reached the mandatory retirement age. He is a native of Huai'an, Jiangsu Province.
