= List of economic and technological development zones in Beijing =

This article is a list of Economic and Technological Development Zones in Beijing, China.

== Municipality-level development zones ==
- Beijing Badaling Development Area
- Beijing Daxing Industrial Development Area
- Beijing Economic-Technological Development Area
- Beijing Liangxiang Industrial Development Area
- Beijing Linhe Industrial Development Area
- Beijing Miyun Development Area
- Beijing Shilong Industrial Development Area
- Beijing Tongzhou Industrial Development Area
- Beijing Xinggu Development Area
- Beijing central business district CBD
- Beijing Financial Street
- Tianzhu Airport Industrial Zone
- Yongle Economic Development Area (Chinese Version)
- Zhongguancun Science Park

== County-level development Zones ==
- Changping Beijing International Information Area
- Daxing Caiyu Industrial Area
- Daxing Huangcun Industrial Area
- Daxing Jiugong Industrial Area
- Daxing Penggezhuang Industrial Area
- Daxing Qingyun Industrial Area
- Daxing Yizhuang Industrial Area (Eastern and Southern Sections)
- Daxing Yufa Industrial Area
- Fangshan Beijing Yanfang Industrial Area
- Fangshan Lianggong Industrial Area
- Fangshan Science and Technology Industrial Area
- Fangshan Yanshan Dongliushui Industrial Area
- Fengtai Baipengyao Industrial Warehousing Area
- Fengtai Changxindian Industrial Area
- Fengtai materials Transport Area
- Huairou Beifang Town Jingwei Industrial Development Area
- Huairou Fengxiang Science and Technology Development Area
- Miyun Binghe Industrial Development Area
- Miyun Jinhu Industrial Development Area
- Miyun Julong Industrial Development Area
- Miyun Longyuan Industrial Development Area
- Miyun Luzhou Industrial Development Area
- Miyun Huadu Industrial Development Area
- Miyun Huayun Industrial Development Area
- Miyun Shanqu Industrial Development Area
- Miyun Yunxi Industrial Development Area
- Pinggu Binghe Industrial Development Area
- Pinggu Mafang Industrial Area
- PingguYukou Economic Development Area
- Shijingshan Badachu Hi-Tech Development Area
- Shunyi Caiyuan Industrial Area
- Shunyi Chengguan Industrial Area
- Shunyi Fulida Industrial Area
- Shunyi Hongda Industrial Area
- Shunyi Jinma Industrial Area
- Shunyi Juyuan Industrial Area
- Shunyi Niulanshan Industrial Area
- Tongzhou Green Food Development Area
- Tongzhou Houxian Town Industrial Area
- Tongzhou Jufuyuan Nationalities Industrial Area
- Tongzhou Light Industrial Garments and Garment Decoration Area
- Tongzhou Majuqiao Xinghuo Intensive Industrial Area
- Tongzhou Yongle Economic Development Area
- Yanqing Economic and Technological Development Area

== See also ==
- Beijing central business district
- Beijing Financial Street
- Economic and Technological Development Zones
- List of economic and technological development zones in Shanghai
