= Zhu Qingyi =

Chinese politician

- 朱清益

Commander of the Lanzhou Military Region Air Force
- In office August 2006 – February 2011
- Preceded by: Jia Yongsheng
- Succeeded by: Zhuang Kezhu

Personal details
- Born: December 1948 (age 77) Yongjia County, Zhejiang, China
- Party: Chinese Communist Party
- Education: PLA Air Force Command Academy

Military service
- Allegiance: China
- Branch/service: People's Liberation Army Air Force
- Years of service: ? – 2011
- Rank: Lieutenant General

Zhu Qingyi (Chinese: 朱清益; born December 1948) is a retired lieutenant general (zhong jiang) of the People's Liberation Army Air Force (PLAAF) of China. He served as commander of the Lanzhou Military Region Air Force and deputy commander of the Lanzhou MR.

== Biography ==
Zhu was born in December 1948 in Yongjia County, Zhejiang Province. He graduated from the PLA Air Force Command Academy.

Zhu served as commander of the PLAAF 30th Fighter Division, and chief of staff of Dalian Air Base. He became assistant chief of staff of the PLAAF in June 1990, and was transferred to the PLA General Staff Department (GSD) in December 1994, working in air force affairs. He attained the rank of major general in July 2000, and was promoted to director of the Political Department of the GSD in May 2005.

In August 2006, he became commander of the Lanzhou Military Region Air Force and concurrently deputy commander of the Lanzhou MR. He was promoted to lieutenant general the following year. He retired from active service in February 2011.

Zhu was a member of the 11th National People's Congress.
