= 2006 People's Liberation Army Air Force KJ-200 crash =

Aviation incident in Anhui, China

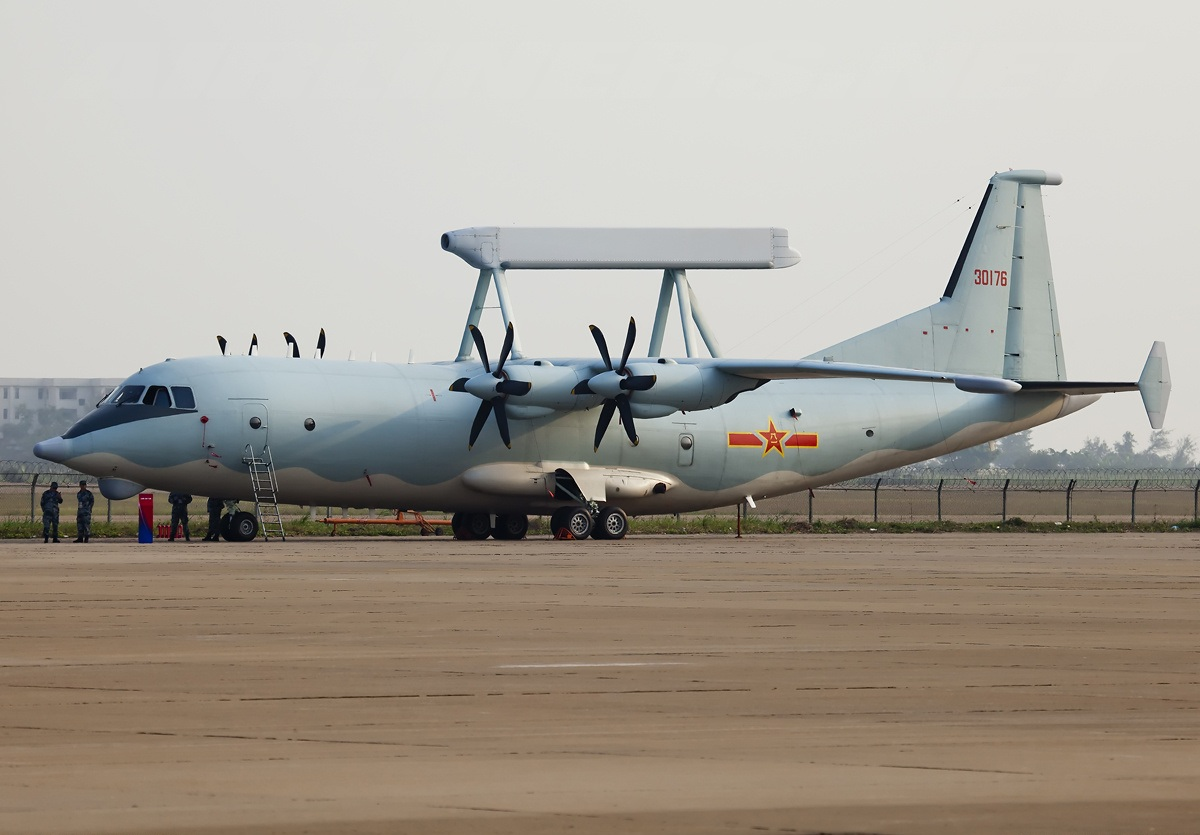
- A People's Liberation Army Air Force KJ-200 similar to the aircraft involved in the incident.

Accident
- Date: June 3, 2006
- Summary: In-flight break-up, loss of control following stall in icing conditions
- Site: Guangde County, Anhui, China; 30°46′35″N 119°16′31″E

Aircraft
- Aircraft type: Shaanxi KJ-200
- Operator: People's Liberation Army Air Force
- Registration: 30172
- Occupants: 40
- Passengers: 35
- Crew: 5
- Fatalities: 40
- Survivors: 0

On June 3, 2006, a People's Liberation Army Air Force KJ-200 crashed in Guangde County, Anhui Province, China. All 40 people on board were killed.

== Background ==
The aircraft involved was a PRC-produced Airborne Warning and Control System (AWACS) plane, one of four that were part of the country's efforts to expand its air defences. The exact model of aircraft involved was never officially identified, although it is believed to have been a KJ-200. The aircraft had been developed in 2002, and have been undergoing extensive tests since then.

The plane was carrying thirty-five electronics and avionics technicians, as well as five crewmembers. It is believed by aviation experts that the large number of people on board the aircraft indicated that some form of test was being conducted. Carrying such a large number of people allowed the plane to avoid transmitting real time data back to the ground, which could be compromised by foreign intelligence services.

== Crash ==
While cruising at 28,000ft, the aircraft encountered icing conditions, entered an uncontrolled descent, likely stalled and partially disintegrated while in the air before crashing into a hillside, killing all 40 people on board. It was one of the worst disasters in the history of the Chinese air force.

== Investigation ==
The Central Military Commission announced of the investigation result on September 7, 2006. The official explanation was that the accident was due to heavy ice formation on the wings after the aircraft made repeated passes in and out of clouds in bad weather. The announcement also declared that nearly a dozen high-ranking military officers were punished, including:

- Jiang Jianzeng, commander of the Nanjing Military Region Air Force (MRAF) and deputy commander of the Nanjing Military Region (MR), was censured.
