= Lhasa Economic and Technological Development Zone =

Area of Lhasa, Tibet, China

The Lhasa Economic and Technological Development Zone (Chinese: 拉萨经济技术开发区), or Lhasa Economic Development Zone, approved by the State Council of the People's Republic of China on September 19, 2001, is the first and only national-level economic and technological development zone in Tibet.

== History ==
In September 2001, the Lhasa Economic and Technological Development Zone was officially approved by the State Council as a state-level development zone. Located in the Doilungdêqên, Lhasa, the capital of the Tibet Autonomous Region, it is situated south of Jinzhu West Road, east of the West Main Drainage Canal, south of the Lhasa River extending to Shakku, and west to Naiqiong Township. The zone is approximately 10 kilometers from Lhasa's city center and 50 kilometers from Lhasa Gonggar Airport.

The development zone spans a total planned area of 5.46 square kilometers, divided into two sections: Area A, covering 2.51 square kilometers, and Area B, covering 2.95 square kilometers. It is designed as a comprehensive development zone focusing on research and development, processing, export, trade, and community building.

== See also ==
- National Economic and Technological Development Zones
