= Yang Guohai =

Chinese politician

- 杨国海

Chief of Staff of the PLA Air Force
- In office September 2007 – July 2013
- Commander: Xu Qiliang; Ma Xiaotian
- Preceded by: Zhao Zhongxin
- Succeeded by: Ma Zhenjun

Personal details
- Born: May 1950 (age 75) Tianjin, China
- Party: Chinese Communist Party

Military service
- Allegiance: China
- Branch/service: People's Liberation Army Air Force
- Years of service: ? – 2013
- Rank: Lieutenant General

Yang Guohai (Chinese: 杨国海; born May 1950) is a retired lieutenant general (zhong jiang) of China's People's Liberation Army Air Force (PLAAF), who served as Chief of Staff of the PLAAF from 2007 to 2013.

== Biography ==
Yang Guohai was born in May 1950 in Tianjin. He became commander of the PLAAF 4th Fighter Division in his late 30s, and commander of the Shanghai air base in 1998. He was an associate of Xu Qiliang in Shanghai, who later rose to become Commander of the PLAAF.

Yang was appointed chief of staff of the Lanzhou Military Region Air Force in 2000, and stayed in the post for six years, which delayed his career advancement. But after he was appointed to deputy chief of staff of the Air Force in 2006, he held that post for hardly a year before being promoted to chief of staff. His deputy period was considered transitional, waiting for the incumbent chief of staff Zhao Zhongxin to vacate the position.

Yang attained the rank of major general in July 1996, and lieutenant general in July 2009. He was a member of the 11th National People's Congress. He retired in July 2013.
