= Jing Wenchun =

- 景文春

Deputy Commander of the PLA Air Force
- In office August 2006 – July 2012
- Commander: Xu Qiliang

Commander of the Beijing Military Region Air Force
- In office December 2004 – August 2006
- Preceded by: Li Yongjin
- Succeeded by: Jia Yongsheng

Personal details
- Born: May 1949 (age 76) Harbin, Heilongjiang, China
- Party: Chinese Communist Party

Military service
- Allegiance: China
- Branch/service: People's Liberation Army Air Force
- Years of service: 1968–2012
- Rank: Lieutenant General

Jing Wenchun (Chinese: 景文春; born May 1949) is a retired lieutenant general (zhong jiang) of the People's Liberation Army Air Force (PLAAF) of China. He served as Deputy Commander of the PLAAF and Commander of the Beijing Military Region Air Force.

== Biography ==
Jing Wenchun was born in May 1949 in Harbin, Heilongjiang Province. He entered PLAAF No. 7 Aviation School in 1965, and joined the air force as a fighter pilot upon his graduation in 1968.

He became a regiment commander in the Beijing Military Region Air Force (Beijing MRAF) in 1980, and later rose to commander of the 17th division of the Beijing MRAF. He then served as deputy commander and commander of Kunming Air Base in the 1990s. He attained the rank of major general in 1995.

Jing served as commander of the 10th Corps (1998), deputy commander of the Beijing MR and commander of the Beijing MRAF (2002–2006) before becoming deputy commander of the PLAAF in August 2006. As one of several deputy commanders, he is in charge of the departments of supporting arms in the Headquarters (electronic warfare, radar and communications, education institutions, and key weapons projects). He was promoted to the rank of lieutenant general in July 2006.

Jing retired from active service in July 2012, after reaching the mandatory retirement age of 63 for deputy military region (DMR)-level commanders. He was replaced by Zhou Laiqiang.
