= Qinghai-Tibet-Sichuan-Tibet Highway Monument =

Monument in Lhasa, Tibet, China

Coordinates: 29.648398°N 91.095679°E

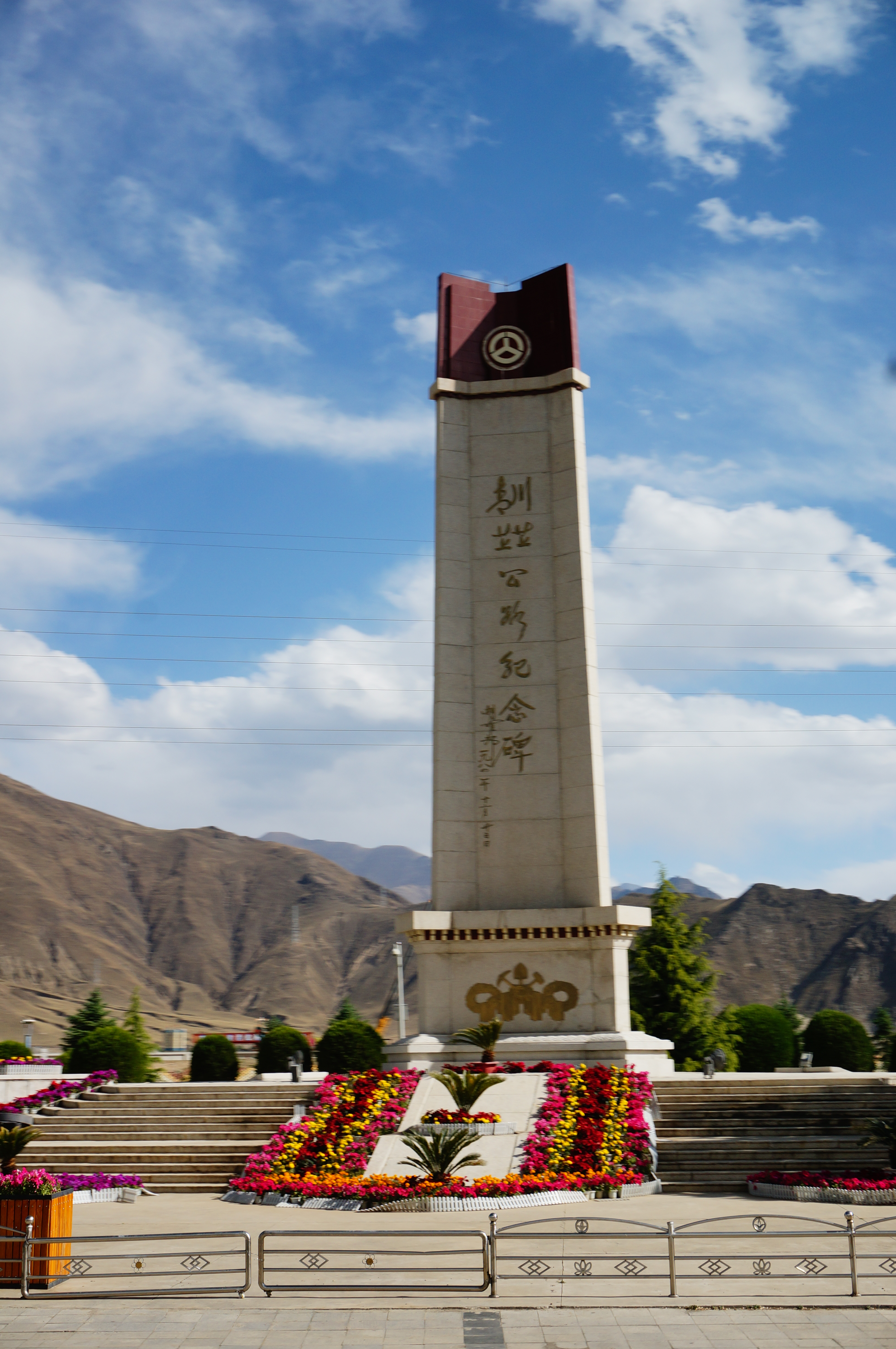
The monument on a sunny day

Qinghai-Tibet-Sichuan-Tibet Highway Monument (Chinese: 青藏川藏公路纪念碑), also known as Sichuan-Tibet and Qinghai-Tibet Highway Monument (Chinese: 川藏、青藏公路纪念碑), Sichuan-Tibet and Qinghai-Tibet Highway Opening Monument (Chinese: 川藏、青藏公路通车纪念碑), is a monument located at the intersection of Jinzhu West Road and Minzu Road, Gongdelin Street, Chengguan District, Lhasa City, Tibet Autonomous Region, People's Republic of China, on the banks of the Lhasa River.

== History ==
The monument was erected on December 25, 1984, to commemorate the 30th anniversary of the opening of the Qinghai-Tibet Highway and the Sichuan-Tibet Highway. The monument was inscribed by Hu Yaobang, then General Secretary of the Chinese Communist Party. On October 7, 2019, it was announced as the eighth batch of National Key Cultural Relics Protection Units.
