= He Weirong =

Chinese military personnel

- 何为荣
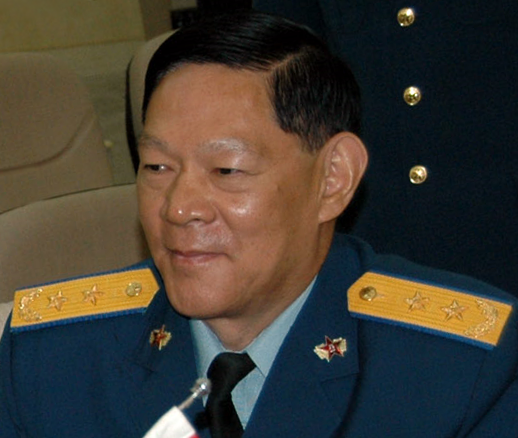

Deputy Commander of the PLA Air Force
- In office December 2005 – 2012
- Commander: Xu Qiliang

Chief of Staff of the PLA Air Force
- In office July 2003 – December 2005
- Preceded by: Zheng Shenxia
- Succeeded by: Zhao Zhongxin

Commander of the Jinan Military Region Air Force
- In office January 2003 – July 2003
- Preceded by: Guo Yuxiang
- Succeeded by: Liu Zhongxing

Personal details
- Born: October 1949 (age 76) Yichang, Hubei, China
- Party: Chinese Communist Party

Military service
- Allegiance: China
- Branch/service: People's Liberation Army Air Force
- Years of service: 1966–2012
- Rank: Air Force General

He Weirong (Chinese: 何为荣; born October 1949) is a retired lieutenant general (zhong jiang) of the People's Liberation Army Air Force (PLAAF) of China. He served as Chief of Staff and then Executive Deputy Commander of the PLAAF.

== Biography ==
He Weirong was born in October 1949 in Yichang, Hubei Province. He joined the PLAAF in 1966 and studied at the Air Force aviation school. In 1999 he graduated from the corps-level officer training program at PLA National Defence University.

He commanded the Sixth Fighter Division and was deputy commander of the Jinan Military Region and commander of the Jinan MR Air Force (2003). He was appointed PLAAF chief of staff in 2003, before assuming his current position in 2005. As executive deputy commander of the PLAAF, He was responsible for operations and training.

He attained the rank of major general in 1993, and lieutenant general in June 2004.
