= List of economic and technological development zones in Shanghai =

This article is a list of Economic and Technological Development Zones in Shanghai, China.

- Shanghai Baoshan Industrial Zone
- Shanghai Caohejing Export Processing Zone
  - Caohejing Export Processing Zone is set up in Shanghai Pujiang Hi-Tech Park, with first stage developed area of 0.9 km^{2}. It is situated close to XuPu Bridge and Outer Ring Road. Caohejing focuses on developing new electronic & IT manufacturing, specializing in computer, new electronic parts, communication and network equipment.
- Shanghai Caohejing Hi-Tech Park
  - Located in the south-west of Shanghai, Shanghai Caohejing Hi-Tech Park is only 11 km away from the city centre, and 7 km away from Hongqiao International Airport. Its total planned area is 14.3 square kilometres. The zone specialises in the development of computers and computer software, large scale integrated circuits and microelectronics technology, numerical controlled communication, precision instruments, bioengineering, space technology, and advanced-electronic technology. By the end of 2001, 280 foreign-invested enterprises had settled in the park. The total amount of foreign investment reached $1.8 billion.
- Shanghai Caohejing Pujiang Hi-Tech Park
  - Caohejing Pujiang Hi-Tech Park (CHJ-PJ) was established in 2004 as an expansion of Caohejing Hi-Tech Park, with the approval of the State Council. CHJ-PJ is composed of three parts, namely, Export Processing Zone, hi-tech industrial area and business supporting area, totalling to 10.7 square kilometres. CHJ-PJ focuses on hi-tech industry development such as electronics, computer & software, aeronautics & astronautics, new energy, new material and modern media etc. and will introduce the relevant supporting industries to facilitate the hi-tech development. As a state-level economic and technological development zone, CHJ-PJ has also been listed by Shanghai Municipal Government as one of the five key industrial parks in Shanghai.
- Shanghai Chemical Industry Park
  - Established in the late 1990s with major expansion in early 2000s with multinationals (such as BASF, Huntsman, Bayer) building plants to make MDI, chlorine, acrylics, and other polymers. It is located some 20 kilometers SW of the city near the village of Caojing.
- Shanghai Chongming Industrial Zone
- Shanghai Comprehensive Industrial Development Zone
- Shanghai China Fengpu Industrial Park
- Shanghai Fengjing Industrial Zone
- Shanghai Fuhua New & Hi-Tech Park
- Shanghai Hengsha Island Tourist Holiday Resort
- Shanghai Hongqiao Economic & Technological Development Zone
  - Shanghai Hongqiao Development Zone is located in the west part of the urban area of Shanghai. It covers an area of 65.2 hectares, with a construction area of 31.09 hectares, a greenery area of 19.54 hectares and a road area of 14.39 hectares. It plans to construct 300,000 sq.m. of exhibition and displaying place, office building, hotel and restaurant, commercial and building, complementary facilities. A foreign consular area has been established in the Development Zone. Shanghai Hongqiao Development Zone is characterized as a foreign trade center, and is the sole commercial and trade development zone in China that integrates the businesses of exhibition, office service, residence, catering and shopping.
- Shanghai International Automobile City/Anting
- Shanghai Jiading Hi-Tech Park
  - Shanghai Jiading Hi-tech Park is one of the “one zone and six parks” of Shanghai High and New Technological Development Zone which was approved in 1991 by the State Council. The planned area of the park is 2 square kilometers, 1.6 square kilometers has already been developed. Industries encouraged in Jiading Hi-Tech park include advanced manufacturing industries such as mechatronics, photoelectronics and information technology, regional and functional industry (automotive industry) as well as modern service industry.
- Shanghai Jiading Industrial Zone
- Shanghai Jiading Export Processing Zone
  - Established on June 3, 2005, with the approval of the State Council, Shanghai Jiading Export Processing Zone completed construction and began operating on April 1, 2008.

Shanghai Jiading Export Processing Zone is located in the northwest of Jiading Industrial Zone. With a designed area of 5.96 km2, Shanghai Jiading Export Processing Zone is divided into export processing area, developing spare area and supporting area. With the customs in Export Processing Zone supervised area of 3 km2, the designed area in Phrase One is 0.989 km2.

- Shanghai Jiading Overseas Students Pioneer Park
- Shanghai Jinqiao Export Processing Zone
  - Shanghai Jinqiao Export Processing Zone is a key state-level development zone under the approval of the Chinese government. The zone is mainly for the development of modern industry, modern residence, modern commerce and trade. It is a high-level development zone integrated with multi-functions of manufacturing, residence, trade, commercial service and community administration. It is administrated in accordance with international practices. The Zone, with a planned area of 20 square kilometers, is divided into two parts by the north-south Jinqiao Road. The eastern part, about 16 square kilometers, is for modern industrial park, modern commerce and trade park and the western part of about 4 square kilometers is for modern residential park, administration and service center.
- Shanghai Jinshan Industrial Zone
- Shanghai Lujiazui Finance & Trade Zone
- Shanghai Minhang Economic & Technological Development Zone
  - Shanghai Minhang Economic & Technological Development Zone was established in 1983. The zone now has a developed area of 3.5 square kilometers. The zone is only 30 kilometers away from the city center. The Zone is 27 kilometers away from the Hongqiao International Airport. A direct access to Pudong International Airport is also available via the Shanghai outer ring road. The Development Zone emphasises on the development of the mechanical and electrical equipment industry, the modern biological and pharmaceutical industry, the food and beverage industry. The establishment of R&D units and high-tech enterprises are also encouraged.
- Shanghai Minhang Export Processing Zone
- Shanghai Pudong Chuansha Economic Park
- Shanghai Pudong Economic and Technological Development Zone
- Shanghai Pudong Heqing Industrial Park
- Shanghai Pudong Kangqiao Industrial Zone
- Shanghai Qingpu Export Processing Zone
  - Established in March 2003 with the approval of the State Council, Shanghai Qingpu Export Processing Zone is a special zone under the regulation of Shanghai Customs enjoying a planned area of 3 square kilometers. Located in the planned territory of Qingpu Industrial Zone, a municipal industrial park in the west of Shanghai. Closed management is adopted in Qingpu Export Processing Zone where organizations and facilities for customs, commodities inspection, taxation, industrial and commercial administration, banking, foreign trade, transportation and customs clearance are available.
- Shanghai Qingpu Industrial Zone
- Shanghai Songjiang Export Processing Zone
  - Songjiang Export Processing Zone (SEPZ), established in April 2000, is one of the first state-level export processing zones. The enterprises in the zone enjoy preferential policies as those in the state-level industrial zones and their export products are exempted from value added tax. SEPZ programmed Phase 1 area is 1.98 square kilometres, whose development has been completed. 35 companies have settled down in the zone. It is planned to attract an investment of US$1.6 billion in the zone, and it has gotten an investment of US$400 million. The companies in the zone all engage in electronics, IT manufacturing, especially in the manufacture of laptops. SEPZ programmed Phase 2 is 2 square kilometers, which is undergoing expansion.
- Shanghai Songjiang Industrial Zone
- Shanghai Spark Development Zone
- Shanghai Waigaoqiao Free Trade Zone
  - Shanghai Waigaoqiao Free Trade Zone (WFTZ), covering an area of 10 square kilometres, is one of the first and largest free trade zones in China. Owing to its outstanding business environment and preferential policies, it has been well recognised as golden bridge of international trade and hottest investment zone for foreign companies in China. Up to now, it has attracted over 9300 companies, among which over 80% are of trading companies. The number of foreign enterprises set up in Waigaoqiao Free Trade Zone has accounted for 1/3 of total in Shanghai. Among which 135 are from Top Fortune 500 companies. In terms of GDP, import & export value, investment, WFTZ accounts for over 60% of the total of 15 FTZ in China.
- Shanghai Xinzhuang Industrial Zone
- Shanghai Xinyang Industrial Park
- Shanghai Zhangjiang High-Tech Park
- Shanghai Zizhu Science-based Industrial Park

== See also ==
- Economic and Technological Development Zones
- List of economic and technological development zones in Beijing
