= TEDA Hospital =

- Location within China

Geography
- Location: 65 Third Street, Binhai District, Tianjin, China
- Coordinates: 39.0277°N 117.7164°E

Organisation
- Type: General

Links
- Website: www.tedahospital.com.cn
- Lists: Hospitals in China

TEDA Hospital (Chinese: 泰达医院) is a general hospital in the Binhai New Area of the Chinese metropolis of Tianjin, named for the Tianjin Economic-Technological Development Area. In 2015, victims of the Tianjin explosions were taken there for treatment.
