= 2015 Tianjin explosions =

Explosions at the Binhai New Area of Tianjin, China

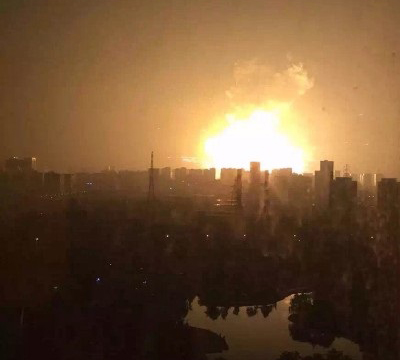
- Fireball from the second explosion
- Date: 12 August 2015
- Time: ~23:30 CST (~15:30 UTC) onwards
- Venue: Port of Tianjin
- Location: Binhai, Tianjin, China; 39°02′23″N 117°44′11″E
- Type: Ammonium nitrate disaster
- Cause: Auto-ignition of nitrocellulose
- Deaths: 173 (including 8 missing, presumed dead)
- Injuries: 798

Location of the explosion

Video of the explosions
- https://www.youtube.com/watch?v=Nivf3Y96I_E

On 12 August 2015, a series of explosions at the Port of Tianjin in Tianjin, Northern China, killed 173 people, according to official reports, and injured hundreds of others. The explosions occurred at a container storage station in the Binhai New Area of Tianjin, China. The first two explosions occurred 33 seconds apart. The second explosion was much larger and involved the detonation of about 800 tonnes of ammonium nitrate (approx. 256 tonnes TNT equivalent). Fires caused by the initial explosions continued to burn uncontrolled throughout the weekend, resulting in eight additional explosions on 15 August.

The cause of the explosions was not immediately known, but an investigation concluded in February 2016 that an overheated container of dry nitrocellulose was the cause of the initial explosion. The official casualty report was 173 deaths (including eight missing), and 798 non-fatal injuries. Of the 173 fatalities, 104 were firefighters.

== Background ==
Tianjin Dongjiang Port Ruihai International Logistics, or Ruihai Logistics, is a privately held logistics company established in 2011. It handled hazardous chemicals within the Port of Tianjin, such as flammable and corrosive substances, oxidizing agents, and toxic chemicals. The company, which employed 70, was designated by the Tianjin Maritime Safety Administration as an approved agent for handling these hazardous chemicals at the port, and its operating license was renewed two months prior to the explosions. Its 46,000-square-metre (500,000 sq ft) site, roughly the size of two city blocks, contained multiple warehouses for hazardous goods, a fire pump and a fire pond.

The warehouse building, owned by Ruihai Logistics, is recorded in a 2014 government document as being a hazardous chemical storage facility for calcium carbide, sodium nitrate, and potassium nitrate. Safety regulations requiring that public buildings and facilities should be at least 1 kilometre (0.62 mi) away were not followed, and local inhabitants were unaware of the danger. The authorities stated that poor record keeping, damage to the office facilities and "major discrepancies" with customs meant that they were unable to identify the substances stored. State media revealed that Ruihai had only received its authorisation to handle dangerous chemicals less than two months earlier, meaning that it had been operating illegally from October 2014, when its temporary license had expired, to June 2015.

== Explosions ==
The first reports of a fire at a warehouse in the Binhai New Area began coming in at around 22:50 local time (14:50 UTC) on 12 August. The first responders were unable to keep the fire from spreading. Firefighters who first arrived on the scene proceeded to douse the fire with water as they were unaware that dangerous chemicals were stored on the site, thereby setting in motion a series of more violent chemical reactions.

At around 23:30 (15:30 UTC), the first explosion occurred and registered as a magnitude 2.3 earthquake, generating seismic shock-waves energetically equivalent to 2.9 tonnes of TNT. After 30 seconds, a second violent explosion occurred, causing most of the damage and injuries with shock-waves felt many kilometres away. The second explosion registered as a magnitude 2.9 earthquake and generated seismic shock-waves with energy equivalent to 21.9 tonnes of TNT. The resulting fireballs reached hundreds of meters in height. Around 23:40 (15:40 UTC) on 15 August, a series of eight smaller explosions occurred in the port as fire from the original blasts continued to spread. The total energy release was equivalent to 28 tonnes of TNT, or 100GJ.

The explosion was large enough to be photographed by Himawari, a geostationary meteorological satellite operated by the Japan Meteorological Agency (JMA). Chinese scientists subsequently estimated that the second more powerful explosion involved the detonation of about 800 tonnes of ammonium nitrate, based on crater size and lethality radius (336 tons TNT equivalent, based on relative effectiveness factor of 0.42).

One month after the explosion, official reports listed 173 deaths and 797 injuries. Media reported the area to be densely populated, with around 5,600 families living within 1.5 kilometres (0.93 mi) radius of the plant, the closest being only 520 metres (1,710 ft; 570 yd) away. Neither the developers nor the buyers were aware of the latent dangers of the activities at the nearby site, with developers also claiming to be victims. According to the Tianjin government, more than 700 people were injured by the explosion, many with extensive injuries, mostly from burns and explosive blast injuries. More than a thousand firefighters responded to the scene. A total of 104 were killed: 24 were firefighters from the China Fire Services branch of the People’s Armed Police, and 80 were volunteer firefighters. An additional five volunteer firefighters were presumed dead. One surviving firefighter from his team, a 19-year-old named Zhou Ti (周倜), was found on the morning of 14 August. The death toll, which also included 11 police officers, was the worst in a single incident for Chinese front line responders since the founding of the People's Republic of China in 1949.

=== Damage ===
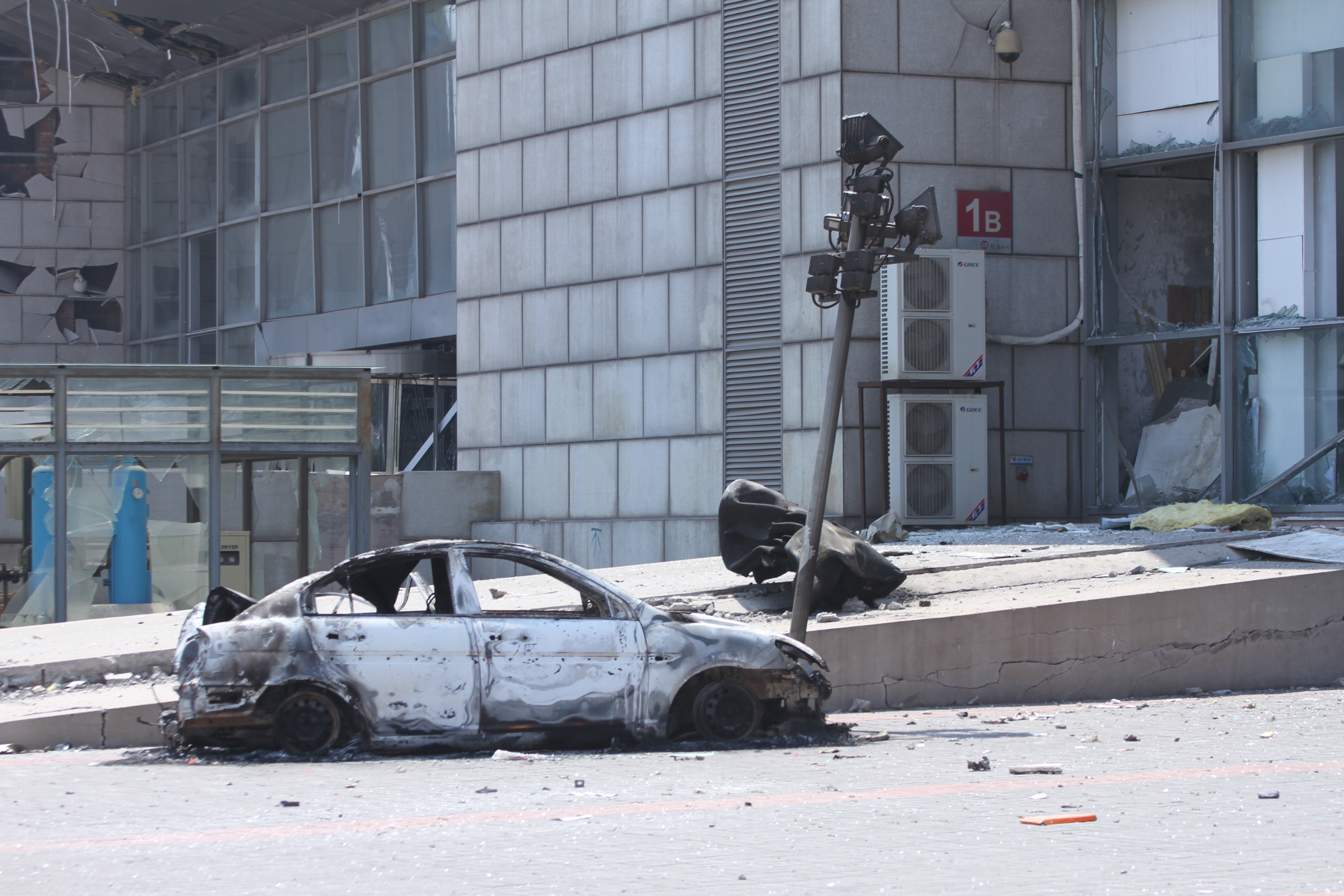
Destroyed car at Donghai Road Station

Photographs and videos showed extensive destruction in and around the warehouse compound, with an enormous crater at the blast site. The buildings of seven more surrounding logistics companies were destroyed, and large quantities of intermodal container stacks were toppled and thrown by the forces of the explosions. More than eight thousand new cars from Hyundai, Kia, Volkswagen, Renault, and Toyota, parked in lots located near the blast site, were largely burned as a result of the initial explosions. Numerous buildings surrounding the blast site were declared "structurally unsafe". In total, 304 buildings, 12,428 cars, and 7,533 intermodal containers were damaged. Beyond insurance, the cost to businesses of the break in the supply chain caused by the explosions was estimated at $9 billion, making it the third most expensive supply chain disruption of 2015.

Apartment blocks 2 km (1.2 mi) from the site sustained shattered glass, loss of roof tiles and damage to ceilings – with 17,000 units being affected. Nearby Donghai Road Station suffered severe damage as a result of the explosions and was closed until 2016, as was the rest of Line 9 of the Tianjin Metro beginning on 13 August. A Japanese department store four kilometres (2.5 mi) away reported damage to walls and ceilings. The explosions also affected the National Supercomputing Center of Tianjin several kilometres away, knocking out windows and causing some internal ceilings to collapse; the center's supercomputer Tianhe-1A itself was not damaged.

=== Cause ===
It is not known what chemicals were being stored at the site. In addition to vast quantities of sodium cyanide and calcium carbide, paperwork was discovered showing that 800 tonnes of ammonium nitrate and 500 tonnes of potassium nitrate were at the blast site. On 17 August, the deputy director of the public security bureau's fire department told CCTV:

Over 40 kinds of hazardous chemicals [were stored on site]. As far as we know, there was ammonium nitrate and potassium nitrate. According to what we know so far, all together there should have been around 3,000 tonnes.

Ammonium nitrate, which is predominantly used as an agricultural fertilizer, oxidizing agent in explosive compositions, and in manufacturing of other chemicals, has been the cause of a number of other fatal industrial explosions. A fire department spokesman confirmed that firefighters had used water in combating the initial fire, which may have led to water being sprayed on calcium carbide, releasing the highly flammable gas acetylene. This would have provided the fuel source for reaction with the oxidizer, ammonium nitrate, thus triggering its detonation more readily.

=== Pollution ===
At least 700 tonnes of highly toxic sodium cyanide was stored at the site – 70 times the legal limit. Sodium cyanide leakage was reported in the sewer. On 13 August, sulphur dioxide, carbon monoxide and nitrogen oxides, all of which are toxic, were detected within 500 m (1,600 ft) of the origin of the explosion, but the levels conformed with the national standards. Gases were undetectable 2 km (1.2 mi) from the site during initial testing on 14 August.

When the first rains after the initial explosions arrived on 18 August, white chemical foam covered the streets. Citizens complained of burning sensations and rashes on sensitive skin regions after coming into contact with rain droplets. However, meteorologists and health experts sought to reassure the public that the rain was not directly harmful to health, whilst the Environment Protection Board advised against exposure to the rain due to traces of cyanide dust reacting with water.

Thousands of dead sticklebacks washed up on the banks 6 km (3.7 mi) from the explosion site on 20 August, fuelling fears of water contamination. Officials downplayed the fears, saying that there were not high levels of cyanide in the river and that the fish likely died due to oxygen depletion in the water.

More precipitation throughout August in the Binhai New Area brought more complaints of skin irritations and burns from volunteers and journalists. A bright white foam manifested yet again on the streets in a similar manner to before. Deng Xiaowen, director of Tianjin's environmental monitoring centre, stated that the foam was "a normal phenomenon when rain falls, and similar things have occurred before".

== Immediate aftermath ==
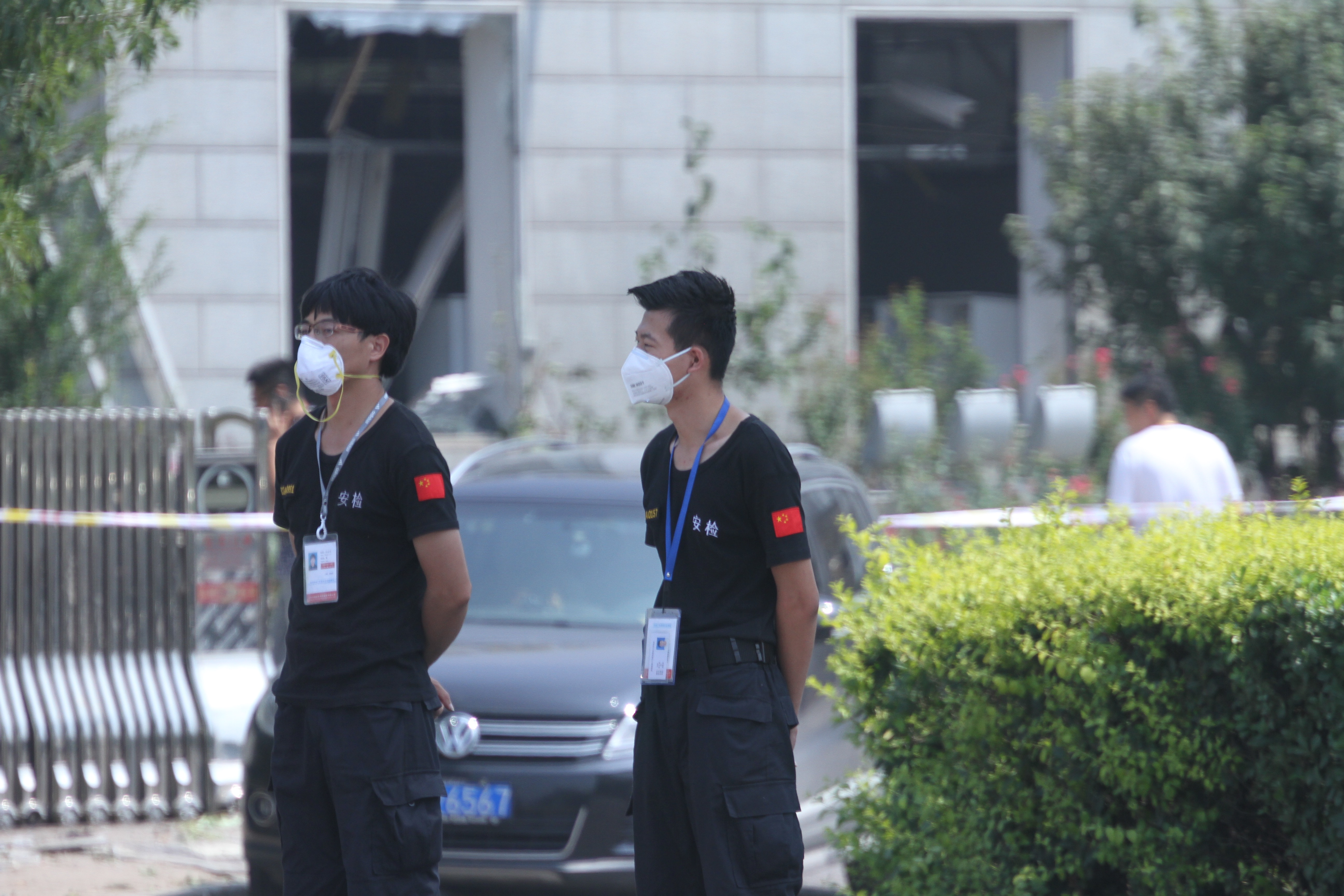
Two security inspectors wearing dust masks near the site of the explosion

Video of the aftermath and interviews with locals

On Thursday morning, the Chinese leaders ordered officers in the city to make full effort in rescuing the injured, and search for those missing. Xi Jinping, the General Secretary of the Chinese Communist Party and Li Keqiang, the Premier of the People's Republic of China, instructed police to investigate the cause of the incident and punish those responsible for the blast.

Tianjin officials, concerned at the potential public response, announced initially that fourteen people had perished in the explosions, but later raised the death toll to forty-four once the scale of the explosions became clear. The South China Morning Post (SCMP) cited a Tianjin police source that officers had been instructed to remove bodies from the scene to deliberately understate the official death toll, which angered the Tianjin government.

The morning following the explosion, military personnel began to arrive in Tianjin to help with the search and recovery efforts. Extra equipment, such as bulldozers, were brought in to help with the clean-up operation. Over 200 nuclear and biochemical experts, including a team from the International Atomic Energy Agency, began arriving in Tianjin to assess the health risks from the chemicals being released into the atmosphere. Government personnel set up twelve temporary monitoring stations near the blast site with above-normal levels of pollutants being detected. A nearby drainage outlet was also closed, and water quality tested.

Firefighting was suspended on the afternoon of 13 August due to the uncertainty of the content and quantity of hazardous materials being stored on site. A team of over two hundred chemical specialists was deployed to assess the hazardous materials on site and dangers to the environment, and to determine the best way to put out the remaining fires and proceed with search and rescue and clean-up operations. Later that day, rescue personnel were dispatched in an attempt to remove the 700 tonnes of sodium cyanide believed to be stored at the site, with hydrogen peroxide being prepared to neutralise the chemicals. Daily press conferences were organised. A press conference organised by local officials held on 14 August came to an abrupt end when a journalist began asking questions as to why such dangerous chemicals were stockpiled so close to housing estates.

Initially, more than 3,500 area residents were staying in temporary shelters, but the number surpassed 6,000 within three days. The government issued an evacuation order over concerns of further explosions; not all residents complied.

On 15 August, local authorities ordered the evacuation of residents within a 3 km (1.9 mi) radius of the blast site, prompted by the threat of "toxic substances", including sodium cyanide.

The State Council ordered inspections of all businesses using dangerous chemicals and explosives across the country.

== Company ownership ==
Hong Kong media announced that Li Liang, the major shareholder of Ruihai Logistics – owning 55%, was the nephew of former chairman of the CPPCC National Committee and ex-party chief of Tianjin, Li Ruihuan, and that the company may have been named after his brother and Li Liang's father; the remaining 45% was owned by Shu Zheng. Reports in state media one week after the explosion were contradictory, holding that Ruihai was owned via proxies by Yu Xuewei, the chairman of Ruihai and a former senior executive at Sinochem, and Dong Shexuan, who served as the company's vice-president and who had been arrested by police by the time of the reports. Dong Shexuan is the son of Tianjin port's former police chief Dong Peijun, who was a colleague of Wu Changshun, the former chief of the public security bureau of Tianjin. The Central Commission for Discipline Inspection (CCDI), CPC's anti-corruption body, charged Wu Changshun with bribery in 2014; Dong Peijun was also under investigation for corruption, but died that year.

== Investigation ==
After the explosions, the CCDI placed Yang Dongliang, Director of the State Administration of Work Safety and China's highest work-safety official, under investigation on 18 August 2015. Yang had previously served as Tianjin's vice mayor for 11 years. In 2012, Yang Dongliang had issued an order to loosen rules for the handling of hazardous substances, which may have enabled Ruihai to store toxic chemicals such as sodium cyanide.

On 27 August, Xinhua reported that police had arrested twelve people with suspected connections to the explosions, including Ruihai Logistics' chairman, vice-chairman, and at least three other managers, with the other seven people unnamed.

On 5 February 2016, the Chinese government issued the investigation report of the explosions. The report concluded the fire started in a container through auto-ignition of nitrocellulose, due to vaporization of the wetting agent during hot weather.

On 8 November 2016, various courts in China handed jail sentences to 49 government officials and warehouse executives and staff for their roles in circumventing the safety rules that led to the disaster. Yu Xuewei, the Chairman of Ruihai Logistics, was sentenced to death with a two-year reprieve.

== Response ==
=== Reactions ===
Immediately following the blasts, the company website was taken down, fuelling suspicions that an attempt was being made to shield owners with powerful political connections. For several days, local residents seeking compensation for their homes protested in front of the venue of the daily press conference. They were joined by distraught families of missing firefighters and confronted police angrily.

The Chinese public security minister threatened severe punishment for those found to be responsible for the explosions. However, the authorities did not release any significant information for several days about the chemicals and circumstances, causing public anger to mount during this time. Marking an official change of tack that suggested top-level endorsement, the official People's Daily joined in to criticise local officials' lack of candour and their use of bureaucratic jargon. In addition, the Global Times remarked on the inadequacy of emergency response and the reluctance of high-ranking officials to answer the public's questions or address their concerns until four days after the blasts. The People's Daily acknowledged that public scepticism of the reported death toll was fuelling rampant rumours; there was growing concern about the emergency assistance provided and how the aftermath was being handled. Attempting to defuse widespread anger at the lack of official transparency, mouthpieces of the ruling party declared that investigations would be thorough and transparent. Former deputy mayor Yang Dongliang was put under investigation for corruption; mayor Huang Xingguo proclaimed his "unshirkable responsibility for this accident". Authorities released information about the ownership of Ruihai, as well as a confession by one beneficial owner for the proxy shareholdings.

Meanwhile, Greenpeace Asia alleged that two Sinochem subsidiaries – Sinochem Tianjin Binhai Logistics Company (with a 130,000-square-metre (1,400,000 sq ft) site) and Tianjin Port Sinochem Hazardous Goods Logistics Company Ltd. – had warehouses in close proximity to a primary and a nursery school, meaning that both were in similar breach of laws.

Observers stated that top officials always attempt to show such disasters as isolated instances, have never accepted political accountability nor addressed the underlying governance issues, and have always heavily censored any criticism of the central government. Willy Lam, professor at CUHK and senior fellow at The Jamestown Foundation, noted the highly unusual period of four days it took for Li Keqiang to make an official visit, suggesting that the lack of a top-ranking visitor to a major disaster site within forty-eight hours despite the proximity to Beijing reflected "division among the leadership on who should be the fall guy."

After the list of fallen firefighters was made public, multiple ambulances had to be deployed due to many family members of the victims having heart attacks out of shock.

=== International reactions ===
In the United States, the New York City Fire Department put their flags at half mast for the week after the explosions.

=== Media coverage ===
==== News outlets ====
Initially, Tianjin authorities banned editors and reporters from sharing information about the disaster on Weibo and WeChat, and websites were ordered to follow state media.

The Tianjin internet police warned social media users to use only official casualty figures.

Tianjin Television had reported the explosion on their early morning news at 7:00 am, but citizens complained that the station had not reported live nor updated on the event, instead showing soap operas eight hours later.

==== Social media ====
A great deal of specific information on the event, including the majority of early stage video, was first released over social media sites, and in particular microblogging platforms like Weibo. Major media has drawn heavily from social media sources, greatly widening the audience. The Economist noted, "Social media fills in the blanks left by official narratives of the Tianjin disaster. The most remarkable feature of the aftermath of the explosions in Tianjin, in Northern China, has been the extraordinary contrast between the official reaction to the crisis, which has been profoundly flawed, and the online reaction, which has entirely dominated the agenda."

==== Censorship and criticism ====
Professional and social media reports were censored by Chinese authorities. The censorship rate increased tenfold on the social media site Weibo, with users reporting the deletion of their posts regarding the blasts, with "Tianjin" and "explosion" being the most censored words. An article by Caijing, which carried an interview with a firefighter who said that no one on the front line had been informed of the dangerous chemicals on site that would react exothermically when mixed with water, was deleted after it had been reposted 10,000 times; many other posts mentioning the existence of deadly sodium cyanide were also expunged.

The Cyberspace Administration of China banned all journalists from posting to social media, and insisted on strict adherence to Xinhua's editorial line. On 15 August, it announced that it had shut down 18 websites and suspended 32 more for spreading false information. More than 360 Weibo and public WeChat accounts which had allegedly been spreading such false rumors have been "punished according to laws". Of these accounts, over 160 were shut down permanently.

Press freedom organization Reporters Without Borders (RSF) accused the Chinese state media of playing up the heroic efforts of rescue workers and firefighters while downplaying the causes of the explosions and the number of casualties. RSF said that censorship by the Chinese authorities showed "a flagrant indifference to the public's legitimate concerns".

A CNN correspondent was interrupted by bystanders and forced to leave during a live report outside TEDA Hospital. A journalist from the Beijing News reported that he and two other reporters were chased by police, caught, searched, and made to delete photographs from their cameras and computers.

=== Clean-up and redress ===
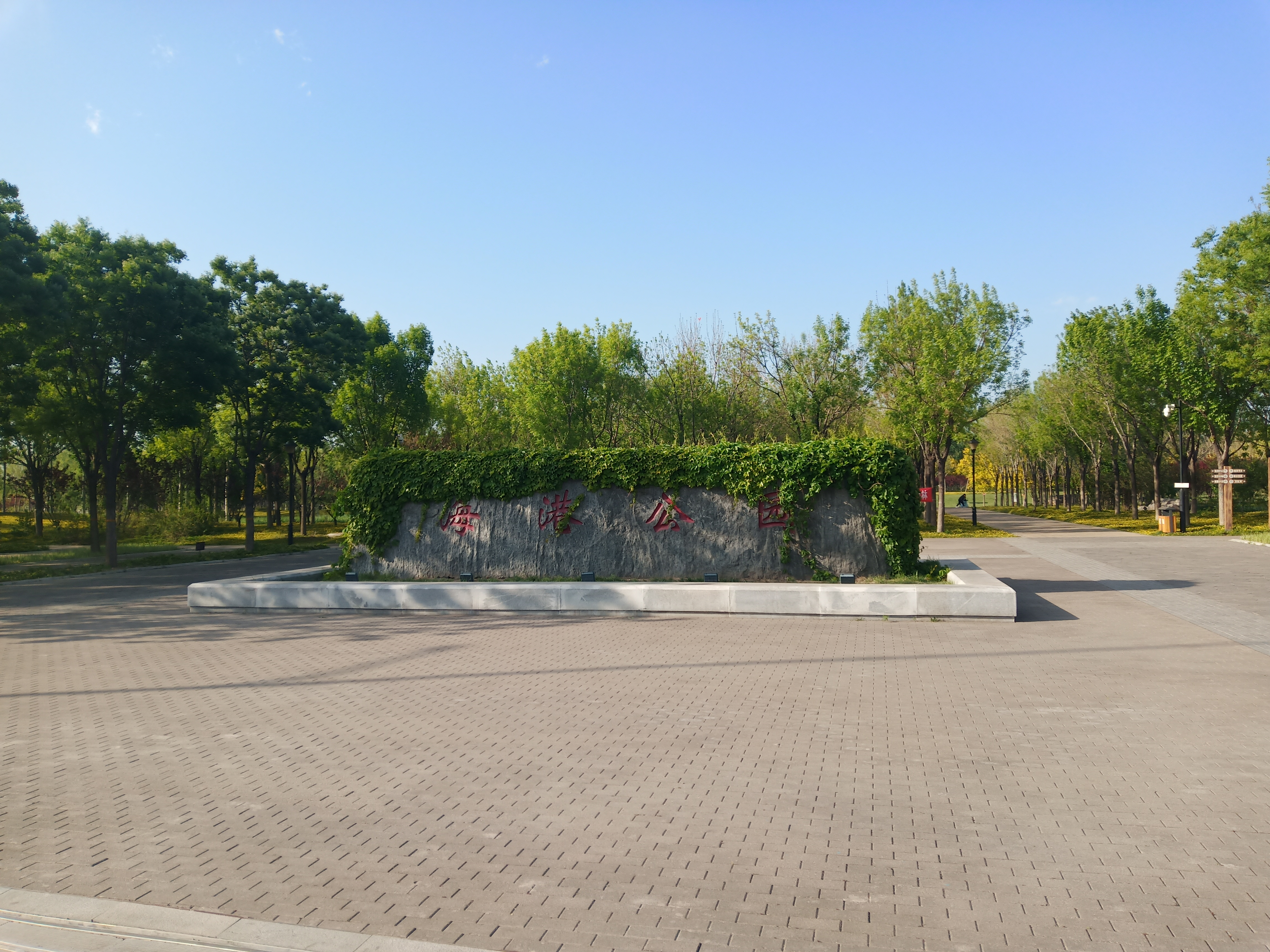
The entrance to Haigang Park, built on the site of the original explosion, in 2021

Tianjin officials announced that as of the deadline on 3 September 2015, more than 9,000 households out of some 17,000 affected by the explosions had signed agreements to settle their damages claims. It was reported that some had chosen to sell their damaged apartments to private developers, who offered them around 130% of the original purchase price, while others accepted an offer from the local government promising to fix the damaged apartments. The local government offered an additional ¥20,000 renminbi ($3,100) to those who agreed to settle their claims by the deadline. The New York Times journalists, however, reported that some owners had faced heavy pressure from government officials to settle; similarly, owners who were employees in state-owned enterprises were under threat of dismissal from their bosses for not settling.

On 10 September 2015 China Daily reported that families of the firefighters killed in the explosions would each receive compensation of 2.3 million yuan (US$360,669), citing a report in Beijing News. It was reported that a monument would be built on the site and that the government planned to compensate residents whose houses were damaged by repurchasing them at 130% of their purchase price.

Less than a month after the disaster, the Tianjin government announced a proposal to turn the site into an "ecological park", repurposing the explosion crater as a lake and promising a memorial to the victims to be built on site. The proposal was heavily criticized on Chinese social media, which derided the rushed announcement as an attempt to erase the damage and avoid accountability. The resulting Haigang Park, opened in early 2017, was further criticized for being an extremely rushed and sloppy design. Both the crater lake and the proposed memorial were ultimately discarded; as a result, there is currently no permanent memorial to the disaster.

== Legacy ==
The China Fire Services Tianjin Fire Department Economic-Technological Development Area Brigade 8th Street Company (now known as the 8th Street Fire and Rescue station), who was the first company to arrive to the explosions and suffered the most casualties out of all companies responding, was given the honorary title "Firefighting hero company" (灭火救援英雄中队) by Xi Jinping and Li Keqiang on 30 December 2016, for their actions during the 2015 Tianjin Explosions, with all 8 fallen firefighters receiving posthumous 1st Class Meritorious Service Medals.

== See also ==
- 2025 Shahid Rajaee port explosion
- 2023 Yinchuan gas explosion
- 2020 Beirut explosion
- 2019 Xiangshui chemical plant explosion
- 2015 Dongying explosion
- 2014 Shanghai stampede
- 2014 Kunshan explosion
- 1988 PEPCON disaster
- Largest artificial non-nuclear explosions
- List of accidents and disasters by death toll
- List of explosions
