= Zhuang Kezhu =

Chinese politician

- 庄可柱

Commander of the Central Theater Command Air Force
- In office January 2016 – December 2018
- Preceded by: New position
- Succeeded by: Han Shengyan (韩胜延)

Commander of the Beijing Military Region Air Force
- In office July 2013 – January 2016
- Preceded by: Ma Zhenjun
- Succeeded by: Position abolished

Commander of the Lanzhou Military Region Air Force
- In office December 2011 – July 2013
- Preceded by: Zhu Qingyi
- Succeeded by: Zhang Yihu

Personal details
- Born: February 1955 (age 71) Yanji, Jilin, China
- Party: Chinese Communist Party (1976-present)
- Education: Yunnan Normal University

Military service
- Allegiance: China
- Branch/service: People's Liberation Army Air Force
- Years of service: 1974 – present
- Rank: Lieutenant General

Zhuang Kezhu (Chinese: 庄可柱; born February 1955) is a lieutenant general (zhong jiang) of the People's Liberation Army Air Force (PLAAF) of China. He was the inaugural Commander of the Central Theater Command Air Force, serving from 2016 to 2018. Prior to that, he served as the Air Force Commander of the Beijing Military Region and the Lanzhou Military Region.

== Biography ==
Zhuang was born in February 1955 in Yanji, Jilin Province. He joined the PLA in March 1974, and the Chinese Communist Party in August 1976. He holds a graduate degree in computer software and theory from Yunnan Normal University.

Zhuang rose quickly in his early career. He was commander of the 33rd Fighter Division, the top division in Southwest China and always the first combat unit to equip with new generation aircraft in that region. He was promoted to commander of the Kunming Forward Headquarters in 1999. In 2005 he was transferred to Beijing to serve as assistant chief of staff of the PLAAF, in charge of combat plans and training of air force units in the southwest. His experience has granted him access to the top air force leadership, and had extensive commanding experience at the basic campaign units.

In January 2005, he became chief of staff of the Lanzhou Military Region Air Force. In July 2010, he was transferred to the same position in the Guangzhou Military Region Air Force. In December 2011, he was promoted to Commander of the Lanzhou Military Region Air Force and Deputy Commander of the Lanzhou MR. In July 2013, he was transferred to the Beijing Military Region to serve as its air force commander and deputy MR commander.

When Central Military Commission chairman Xi Jinping reorganized the military in January 2016, Zhuang was appointed the inaugural commander of the Central Theater Command Air Force, and Liu Shaoliang became the first political commissar. After reaching the age of 63, Zhuang was replaced by Lt. Gen. Han Shengyan (韩胜延) as commander in December 2018.

Zhuang attained the rank of major general in July 2002 and lieutenant general in July 2013. He was a member of the 12th National People's Congress.
