= Zhao Zhongxin =

Chinese military officer (born 1949)

- 赵忠新

Deputy Commander of the PLA Air Force
- In office 2007–2012
- Commander: Xu Qiliang

Chief of Staff of the PLA Air Force
- In office 2005–2007
- Preceded by: He Weirong
- Succeeded by: Yang Guohai

Personal details
- Born: September 1949 (age 76) Jiaxiang, Shandong, China
- Party: Chinese Communist Party

Military service
- Allegiance: China
- Branch/service: People's Liberation Army Air Force
- Years of service: ? – 2012
- Rank: Lieutenant General

Zhao Zhongxin (Chinese: 赵忠新; born September 1949) is a retired lieutenant general (zhong jiang) of the People's Liberation Army Air Force (PLAAF) of China. He served as Chief of Staff and then Deputy Commander of the PLAAF.

== Biography ==
Zhao Zhongxin was born in September 1949 in Jiaxiang County, Shandong Province.

He served as deputy regimental commander of the 57th Regiment of the PLAAF 19th Fighter Division, and then division commander. He was commander of the Dalian Air Base (2000), and then chief of staff for Chengdu Military Region AF (October 2002) and Nanjing Military Region Air Force (July 2003). He became deputy chief of staff of the PLAAF in 2004 and chief of staff of the PLAAF in 2005. He was appointed Deputy Commander of the PLAAF in 2007. Yang Guohai succeeded him as chief of staff. As one of several PLAAF deputy commanders, Zhao was in charge of headquarters affairs and air force military region affairs.

Zhao attained the rank of major general in 2000, and lieutenant general in July 2007.
