= Jia Yongsheng =

Chinese politician

- 贾永生

Commander of the Lanzhou Military Region Air Force
- In office December 2003 – August 2006
- Preceded by: Huang Hengmei
- Succeeded by: Zhu Qingyi

Commander of the Beijing Military Region Air Force
- In office August 2006 – January 2011
- Preceded by: Jing Wenchun
- Succeeded by: Jiang Jianzeng

Personal details
- Born: October 1947 (age 78–79) Tongzhou, Beijing, China
- Party: Chinese Communist Party
- Education: PLAAF No. 8 Aviation Academy; PLA National Defence University; Central Party School of the Chinese Communist Party

Military service
- Allegiance: China
- Branch/service: People's Liberation Army Air Force
- Years of service: 1964–2011
- Rank: Lieutenant General

Jia Yongsheng (Chinese: 贾永生; born October 1947) is a retired lieutenant general (zhong jiang) of the People's Liberation Army Air Force (PLAAF) of China. He served as commander of the Lanzhou Military Region Air Force and the Beijing Military Region Air Force.

== Biography ==
Jia was born in October 1947 in Tongzhou, Beijing. He enlisted in the PLAAF in August 1964, and studied at the PLAAF No. 8 Aviation Academy. He later also studied at PLA National Defence University and the Central Party School, receiving a master's degree.

In December 1991, Jia became chief of staff of the PLAAF Tangshan Forward Headquarters. A year later, he was appointed deputy chief of staff of the Lanzhou Military Region. He attained the rank of major general in July 1994. In December 1996, he was transferred to the PLAAF headquarters to serve as deputy chief of staff. In December 2003, he was appointed commander of the Lanzhou Military Region Air Force and concurrently deputy commander of the Lanzhou MR. He was promoted to lieutenant general in July 2005. In August 2006, he was transferred to the Beijing Military Region to serve in the same positions. He retired from active service in January 2011.

Jia was a member of the 11th National People's Congress.
