= Shuyang Economic and Technological Development Zone =

Shuyang
- Economic and Technological Development Zone
- Shuyang Economic and Technological Development Zone
- Location in China
- Coordinates: 34°06′52″N 118°46′08″E
- Country: China
- Province: Jiangsu
- Established: 2001

Area
  - Land: 24.5 km^{2} (9.5 sq mi)
- Time zone: UTC+8 (China standard time)
- Area code: 223600
- Website: http://www.shuyang.gov.cn/shuyangjjkfq/

Shuyang Economic and Technological Development Zone (沭阳经济技术开发区) is an area in Shuyang County, Jiangsu Province, China. It is one of the China National Economic and Technological Development Zones with an area of 24.5 km^{2}.

== History ==
Founded in August 2001, the Shuyang Economic Development Zone is a significant portion of the industrial sector of Shuyang. In December 2013, it was upgraded to one of the China National Economic and Technological Development Zones and the name of the development zone was changed to Shuyang Economic and Technological Development Zone (SETDZ).

== Industry ==
SETDZ is noted for its machinery, advanced materials, electronic systems and software. There are over 400 enterprises in SETDZ and most of them are invested in by domestic capital.

More than 9 billion RMB has been spent on infrastructure within the zone, mainly collected from the private sector. According to the statistics in 2011, SETDZ created a GDP of 5 billion RMB.

Nowadays, the performance of the SETDZ-owned industry is getting stronger as a considerable number of enterprises controlled by SETDZers are approaching a high level.

30,000 KW thermal station in East Hangzhou Road is the main supplier of SETDZ..

== Geography ==
SETDZ was located to the east of Shuyang's urban area. As the city has expanded since 2005, SETDZ has surrounded the metropolitan area. Critics believe SETDZ is the main polluter to the city.
