= Huaihai opera =

Form of traditional Chinese theatre

Huaihai opera (simplified Chinese: 淮海戏; traditional Chinese: 淮海戲) is a form of local traditional Chinese theatre which combines musics, vocal performance, and dance. Some plays contain mime, acrobatics, and Kung fu. It was created in the 19th century and fully developed in the World War II. The form is popular in Shuyang, Suqian, Lianyungang and Yancheng, with the dialect of Shuyang as the standard pronunciation.

== History ==
Huaihai opera began in the years around the 1830s and originally as a folk ditty in Shuyang. Fifty years later, several famous troupes were found and spread to the other regions near Shuyang rapidly. In 1900, female artists first appeared on the stage. In the Second Sino-Japanese War (World War II), almost all the artists jointed the resistance. The artists wrote and played hundreds of new operas in order to energize the people. This also was the fully developed and recognised time for the Huaihai opera.

== Modern development ==
The four decades from the 1950s to 1980s were another golden age for the opera. However, the diversified means of cultural consumption and the impacts from TV programs, pop music, and internet have almost driven the opera into a blind alley. Furthermore, the influence of Western culture has also left the younger generations impatient with the slow pacing of Huaihai opera. In response, the opera began to see reform starting in the 1990s, whereas these reforms have been hampered by a lack of funding that makes the performance of new plays difficult. It is common for other traditional Chinese operas. Now, Huaihai opera is listed on Chinese National Intangible Cultural Heritage.

== Performers and roles ==
Like most of traditional Chinese theatres, a Huaihai opera performer requires a long and arduous apprenticeship beginning from an early age. Before the 1940s, pupils were often

handpicked at a young age by a tutor and trained for at least 5 years on contract from the child's parents. In larger troupes, the pupils would be trained for Peking opera as well, which made the contract even longer. The tutorial skills are copied from the Peking opera. Performers are first trained in acrobatics, followed by singing and gestures. Since the teacher fully provided for the pupil during this period, the student accrued a debt to his master that was later repaid through performance earnings.

=== Sheng ===
The Sheng (生) is the main male role in Huaihai opera. This role were originally divided into five subtypes.

- The laosheng is a dignified older role. These characters are generally gentlemen, senior officers, generals, and noblemen.
- The Xiaosheng is a young handsome male character. Similar to Kunqu and Peking opera, these characters sing in a high, shrill voice with occasional breaks to represent the voice changing period of adolescence. The xiaosheng performer are often involved in the love stories with beautiful women.
- Wentongsheng: Wentongsheng refers to a bit role.
- Jianbai
- Goujue

=== Dan ===
The Dan (旦) refers to any female role in Huaihai opera. Dan roles were originally divided into five subtypes.

- Naixiaodan: Naixiaodan refers to little girls.
- Huadan: A vivacious and unmarried woman.
- Qingyi: A virtuous and elite woman.
- Laodan: An old woman.
- Caidan: A female clown role.

== Staging ==
The Huaihai opera is fairly close to people's lives and it can be played at anywhere. After the 1880s, some opera stages were built according to the stage of Peking opera. The stages have traditionally been square platforms. The action on stage is usually visible from at least three sides.

== Aural performance elements ==
=== Stage speech ===
Huaihai opera is performed using both Shuyang dialect and Modern Standard Chinese now.

=== Song ===
The most common tunes of Huaihai opera are "Eastern" as well as "Good Sights". The song lyrics generally includes emotive, condemnatory, narrative, descriptive, disputive, and "shared space separate sensations" lyrics.

=== Music ===
The accompaniment for a Huaihai opera performance includes an ensemble of melodic and percussion instruments. The lead melodic instrument is the sanxian, a three-stringed fretless plucked musical instrument. The second melodic instrument is the erhu, a two-stringed bowed musical instrument. Since the instruments of Peking opera are introduced, the percussion instruments like the daluo, xiaoluo, and naobo have played more important role in the performance.

== Repertoire ==
The repertoire of Huaihai opera involves of over 100 works. Most of the works are focused on the lives of ordinary people. The plays taken from historical novels or traditional stories are also very popular.
