= 24th Fighter Aviation Division =

Aviation unit of the Chinese Air Force

The 24th Fighter Aviation Division is a unit of the Chinese People's Liberation Army Air Force. It is headquartered at Yangcun Air Base in the Beijing Military Region. The unit is equipped with J-8 fighters. PLA-AF fighter divisions generally consist of about 17,000 personnel and 70-120 aircraft.

Since 1952 the 24th has shot down three enemy aircraft and many balloons.

== Sub Units ==
24th Fighter Division sub units:

- 70th Regiment
- 71st Regiment
- 72nd Regiment

== Notable people ==
- Ding Laihang

== See also ==
- List of Chinese aircraft
- List of Airbases in the PLAAF
- People's Liberation Army Air Force
- People's Liberation Army
