= Jiang Jianzeng =

Chinese politician

- 江建曾

Commander of the Nanjing Military Region Air Force
- In office December 2004 – January 2011
- Preceded by: Liu Chengjun
- Succeeded by: Yi Xiaoguang

Commander of the Beijing Military Region Air Force
- In office January 2011 – June 2012
- Preceded by: Jia Yongsheng
- Succeeded by: Ma Zhenjun

Personal details
- Born: January 1949 (age 77) Hong'an, Hubei, China
- Party: Chinese Communist Party

Military service
- Allegiance: China
- Branch/service: People's Liberation Army Air Force
- Years of service: ? – 2012
- Rank: Lieutenant General

Jiang Jianzeng (Chinese: 江建曾; born January 1949) is a retired lieutenant general (zhong jiang) of the People's Liberation Army Air Force (PLAAF) of China. He served as commander of the Nanjing Military Region Air Force and the Beijing Military Region Air Force.

== Biography ==
Jiang was born in January 1949 in Hong'an, Hubei Province. He is the son of Major General Jiang Bo (江波), who was deputy political commissar of the Shaanxi Military District.

Jiang served as commander of the PLAAF 14th Fighter Division, and chief of staff of the 8th Corps in December 1993. He attained the rank of major general in July 1995. He was appointed commander of the Dalian Air Base in October 1999, and deputy chief of staff of PLAAF in 2001.

In December 2004, Jiang became commander of the Nanjing Military Region Air Force and concurrently deputy commander of the Nanjing MR. On 3 June 2006, a PLAAF KJ-200 crashed in Guangde County, Anhui Province, killing 40 people on board. Jiang was among about a dozen military officers who were held responsible and punished in the aftermath of the accident. He was given demerit points which damaged his prospect for promotion, and his career was temporarily frozen. Nevertheless, he was promoted to the rank of lieutenant general in July 2006, before the punishment was announced.

In January 2011, Jiang was appointed commander of the Beijing MR Air Force and deputy commander of the Beijing MR. He retired from active service in July 2012, after reaching the mandatory retirement age of 63 for deputy military region (DMR) commanders. He was replaced by Ma Zhenjun.

Jiang was a member of the 11th National People's Congress.
