= Jinzhu West Road =

Road in Lhasa, Tibet, China

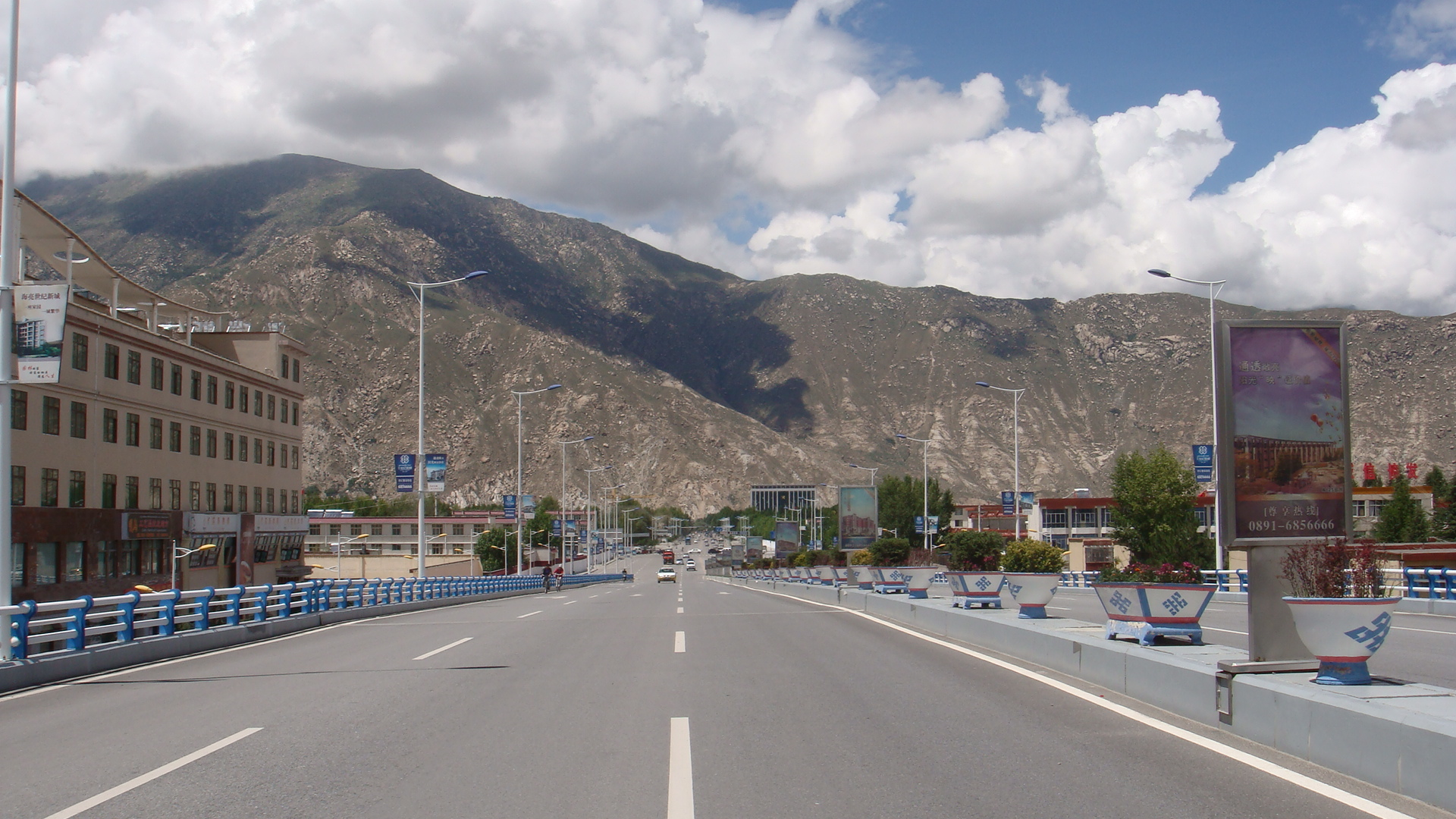
Jinzhu West Road

Jinzhu West Road (Chinese: 金珠西路) is a major road in Lhasa, Tibet Autonomous Region, China. In honor of the People's Liberation Army to build the road and enter the city of Lhasa, the road got its name, for the Tibetan People's Liberation Army phonetic translation of the Chinese abbreviation for "Jinzhu Mami" (Standard Tibetan: བཅིངས་འགྲོལ་དམག་མི, romanized: chingdrol makmi).

== History ==
Jinzhu West Road is for the east–west direction, east of Jinzhu Middle Road, west of Dulong Avenue. On December 1, 2004, Jinzhu West Road reconstruction and expansion project began, the road is 8.228 kilometers long, the starting point for the Monument of Qinghai-Tibet-Chuan-Tibet Highway (Chinese: 青藏川藏公路纪念碑), the end point for the Peace Road and the Qinghai-Tibet Highway to the west of the intersection, the project includes roads, bridges and culverts, water supply and drainage, traffic safety facilities, landscaping support projects, etc., a total investment of 230 million yuan RMB. After the expansion project, Jinzhu West Road becomes cement concrete road surface, road width of 44 meters, four type six lanes, the central green belt. After the completion of this project, this road became the widest urban road in the Tibet Autonomous Region, and on August 26, 2005, on the eve of the 40th anniversary of the founding of the Tibet Autonomous Region (September 1, 2005), as a key project, the reconstruction and expansion of Jinzhu West Road was completed and opened to traffic.
