= Shu River =

Location
- Country: China

Shu River
- Chinese: 沭河
Transcriptions
Standard Mandarin
- Hanyu Pinyin: Shù Hé
- Wade–Giles: Shu Ho

Shu River (Chinese: 沭河) is a river in Shandong Province, China, that flows into the Yellow Sea.

== See also ==
- List of rivers in China
