= Shuyang County =

Shuyang 沭阳县
- County
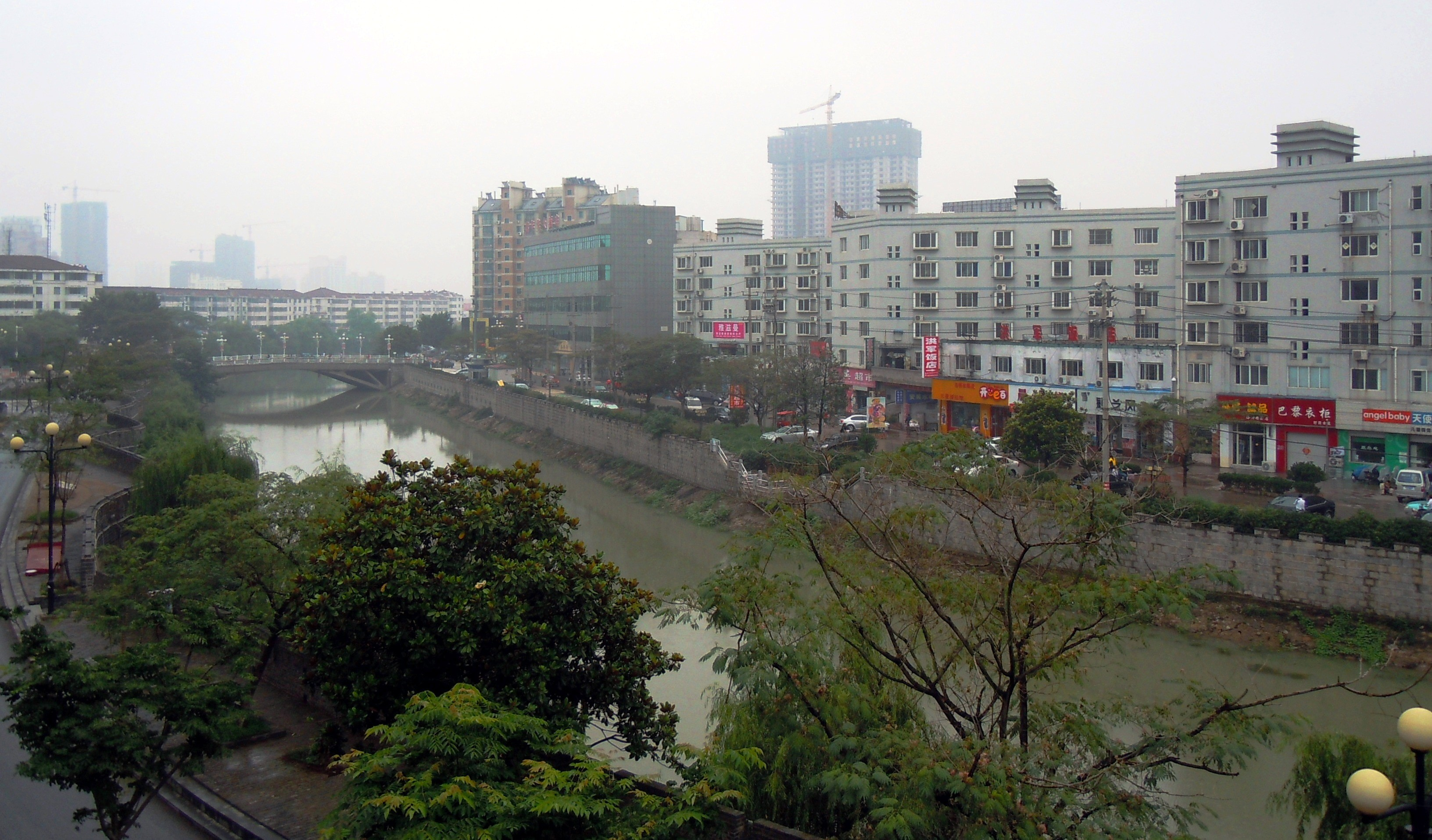
- Shuyang County in July 2011

- Location in Jiangsu
- Coordinates: 34°06′52″N 118°46′08″E
- Country: People's Republic of China
- Province: Jiangsu
- Prefecture-level city: Suqian
- Established: 582 BC

Government
  - Type: Province Managing County
  - Mayor: Hu Jianjun (胡建军)

Area
  - County: 2,298 km^{2} (887 sq mi)

Population (2019)
  - County: 1,930,000
  - Density: 840/km^{2} (2,180/sq mi)
  - Urban: 650,000
  - Metro: 650,000
- Time zone: UTC+8 (China Standard)
- Postal code: 223600
- Area code: 527
- GDP: ¥63.01billion (2015)
- Major Nationalities: Han
- Township-level divisions: 34
- License Plate: 苏N
- Website: www.shuyang.gov.cn

Shuyang County
- Traditional Chinese: 沭陽
- Simplified Chinese: 沭阳
Transcriptions
Standard Mandarin
- Hanyu Pinyin: Shùyáng

Shuyang (simplified Chinese: 沭阳县; traditional Chinese: 沭陽縣; pinyin: Shùyáng Xiàn) is a county in northern Jiangsu province. It is under the administration of the prefecture-level city of Suqian. Shuyang sits on the Northern Jiangsu Plains and borders the cities of Xuzhou, Lianyungang, and Huai'an to the north, east, and south.

Shuyang is a pilot administrative division for "provinces governing county level units directly" in Jiangsu, along with Kunshan and Taixing. Shuyang Town has a total area of 184 km², of which 19.3 million hectares are mountainous and 2.5 million hectares are arable land. It has 18 administrative villages and a total population of more than 26,000.

== Etymology ==
The name of “Shuyang” was first officially used in 549 AD during Eastern Wei.

The two Chinese characters in the county's name are “沭” and “阳”, together meaning “in the north of the Shu River”. As the government and commercial center, the county seat was chosen to be constructed in the north of Shuhe River in 549 AD in order to control the land around the river basin.

== History ==
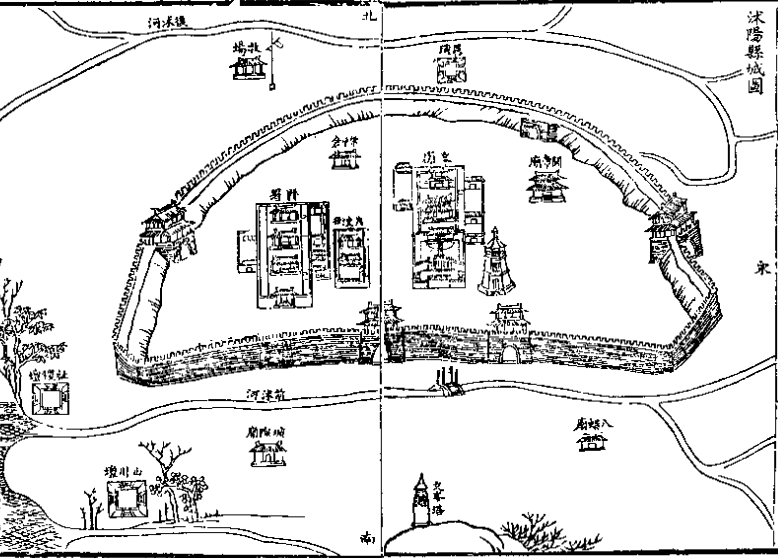
The City Wall in 1803

Prior to its proclamation as the Zhou Dynasty in 1111 BC, the area around the north of Jiangsu was inhabited by the Dongyi, an ancient ethnic group that established numerous city-states. The area around Shuyang belonged to Tan (郯), one of the Dongyi states.

In the late period of the Zhou Dynasty, that is Spring and Autumn period, the State of Lu began to expand its power to the south. Part of the region was officially proclaimed as the territory of the State of Lu in 582 BC after the fortress "Zhongcheng" (中城), was built on the northwest. This is also the first city in this place in accordance with ‘The Spring and Autumn Annals’, which was compiled by Confucius. In the Warring States period, the Chu conquered and controlled the land of this area.

After Qin's wars of unification, the Qin Dynasty was established by Qin Shi Huang, the first emperor of China. Houqiu County (厚丘县) was founded for administrating the region and the governments of later dynasties generally followed this pattern.

In 549 AD, the imperial government of Eastern Wei abandoned the old castle and city wall and moved the local government into a new county seat near the north of Shu River. In the meantime, the county was changed to the present name, Shuyang County (沭阳县). In the following 1400 years, the location of the county seat was kept constant.

As the main natural disaster in northern Jiangsu, rain storms and floods were the principal threat to the county in the old days. The castle and city wall of Shuyang was totally destroyed up to the middle of the 15th century. The government rebuilt the city wall until 1512 and was ruined by the floods subsequently. In 1594, the local government started to rebuild a substantial one with plenty of bricks and stones and it was finished in 1616.

The area was invaded by Imperial Japan in 1937. The ancient city wall and other pieces historic architecture were devastated at the beginning of the war.

== Geography ==
Shuyang Town, in Nanjing County, is located in the southwestern part of Zhangzhou City, in the mountainous region of southern Fujian, and has a forest cover of 76.2%. The town has an average elevation of approximately 400 metres, with its highest point reaching 1,399 metres. It has a typically subtropical, mild climate with abundant rainfall, which supports the growth of crops such as wheat and maize. Its mountainous terrain and extensive agricultural land support the production of various agricultural and related products. Shuyang is an important production area for bamboo, fruit, tea, flue-cured tobacco and vegetables in Zhangzhou. The town's tea cultivation area exceeds 60,000 hectares, accounting for 60% of the county's total.

In terms of its forestry background, Nanjing County, where Shuyang Town is located, has an extensive forestry sector. Its main forest products include orchids, bamboo and other forestry products. Nanjing County has the largest orchid cultivation area in the province. In addition, its production and sales of Dendrobium (Dendrobium officinale), Anoectochilus and Pleurotus eryngii are among the highest in the province. Pollution has a relatively limited impact on the forestry sector.

In agriculture, nitrogen- and phosphorus-containing fertilizers, as well as large quantities of livestock manure, are used to improve crop yields. These materials eventually enter rivers and lakes through surface runoff and subsurface flow, contributing to water pollution. The water environment is characterized by complex changes and various sources of uncertainty.

First, changes in water flow, which transports pollutants, constitute a random process influenced by climate, soil conditions, and human and biological activities. Second, the composition and quantity of pollutants entering water bodies vary over time and space. Finally, physical, chemical, biological, and other pollutants affect water bodies. Processes such as dilution, diffusion, decomposition, coagulation and precipitation follow certain chemical and physical principles, but their effects can also vary under different environmental conditions.

=== Climate ===
Shuyang has a distinct four-season, monsoon-influenced humid subtropical climate with hot, humid summers, and generally mild, dry winters (Köppen climate classification Cfa).

Winters are generally mild and dry. However, cold northwesterly winds from Mongolia and Siberia can cause temperatures to drop below freezing in the night, and there has been occasional snowfall in winters in recent years. Summers are hot and humid; southeasterly winds during the summer can push temperatures above 35 °C (95 °F). In midsummer, occasional downpours or thunderstorms can be expected.

Climate data for Shuyang, elevation 10 m (33 ft), (1991–2020 normals, extremes 1981–2010)
| Month | Jan | Feb | Mar | Apr | May | Jun | Jul | Aug | Sep | Oct | Nov | Dec | Year |
|---|---|---|---|---|---|---|---|---|---|---|---|---|---|
| Record high °C (°F) | 17.2 (63.0) | 25.6 (78.1) | 27.0 (80.6) | 31.4 (88.5) | 36.4 (97.5) | 37.5 (99.5) | 38.9 (102.0) | 36.6 (97.9) | 34.8 (94.6) | 33.5 (92.3) | 27.6 (81.7) | 20.4 (68.7) | 38.9 (102.0) |
| Mean daily maximum °C (°F) | 5.8 (42.4) | 8.8 (47.8) | 14.1 (57.4) | 20.4 (68.7) | 25.5 (77.9) | 29.5 (85.1) | 31.0 (87.8) | 30.5 (86.9) | 27.0 (80.6) | 22.0 (71.6) | 14.9 (58.8) | 8.1 (46.6) | 19.8 (67.6) |
| Daily mean °C (°F) | 0.8 (33.4) | 3.5 (38.3) | 8.4 (47.1) | 14.6 (58.3) | 20.0 (68.0) | 24.2 (75.6) | 27.0 (80.6) | 26.3 (79.3) | 22.0 (71.6) | 16.2 (61.2) | 9.4 (48.9) | 2.9 (37.2) | 14.6 (58.3) |
| Mean daily minimum °C (°F) | −3.0 (26.6) | −0.7 (30.7) | 3.7 (38.7) | 9.4 (48.9) | 14.9 (58.8) | 19.8 (67.6) | 23.8 (74.8) | 23.2 (73.8) | 18.2 (64.8) | 11.7 (53.1) | 5.1 (41.2) | −1.0 (30.2) | 10.4 (50.8) |
| Record low °C (°F) | −15.6 (3.9) | −17.1 (1.2) | −9.6 (14.7) | −1.2 (29.8) | 3.3 (37.9) | 9.9 (49.8) | 17.7 (63.9) | 14.2 (57.6) | 7.5 (45.5) | −1.4 (29.5) | −7.6 (18.3) | −18.0 (−0.4) | −18.0 (−0.4) |
| Average precipitation mm (inches) | 22.9 (0.90) | 26.2 (1.03) | 36.9 (1.45) | 50.6 (1.99) | 71.3 (2.81) | 124.6 (4.91) | 210.7 (8.30) | 194.4 (7.65) | 84.4 (3.32) | 38.5 (1.52) | 35.6 (1.40) | 20.9 (0.82) | 917 (36.1) |
| Average precipitation days (≥ 0.1 mm) | 4.7 | 5.6 | 6.4 | 6.7 | 8.1 | 8.3 | 13.3 | 12.4 | 7.8 | 5.7 | 5.8 | 4.5 | 89.3 |
| Average snowy days | 2.6 | 2.2 | 0.9 | 0 | 0 | 0 | 0 | 0 | 0 | 0 | 0.5 | 1.2 | 7.4 |
| Average relative humidity (%) | 69 | 68 | 66 | 67 | 72 | 75 | 84 | 85 | 80 | 74 | 72 | 69 | 73 |
| Mean monthly sunshine hours | 142.5 | 140.4 | 174.5 | 198.2 | 208.0 | 166.6 | 163.8 | 167.9 | 170.8 | 171.3 | 147.7 | 146.3 | 1,998 |
| Percentage possible sunshine | 45 | 45 | 47 | 51 | 48 | 39 | 38 | 41 | 47 | 49 | 48 | 48 | 46 |
Source: China Meteorological Administration

== Administrative divisions ==
Shuyang County administers 6 subdistricts, 23 towns, 1 township, and 2 other township-level divisions.

=== Subdistricts ===
The county administers the following 6 subdistricts:

- Shucheng Subdistrict (沭城街道)
- Shizi Subdistrict (十字街道)
- Nanhu Subdistrict (南湖街道)
- Zhangji Subdistrict (章集街道)
- Mengxi Subdistrict (梦溪街道)
- Qixiong Subdistrict (七雄街道)

=== Towns ===
The county administers the following 23 towns:

- Longji (陇集镇)
- Liheng (李恒镇)
- Huji (胡集镇)
- Zhaxia (扎下镇)
- Qianji (钱集镇)
- Yanji (颜集镇)
- Tanggou (塘沟镇)
- Tongyang
- Machang (马厂镇)
- Longmiao (龙庙镇)
- Yitao (沂涛镇)
- Gaoxu (高墟镇)
- Miaotou (庙头镇)
- Gengwei (耿圩镇)
- Hanshan (韩山镇)
- Xinhe (新河镇)
- Huachong (华冲镇)
- Xianguan (贤官镇)
- Sangxu (桑墟镇)
- Wuji (吴集镇)
- Yuelai (悦来镇)
- Qingyihu (青伊湖镇)
- Liuji (刘集镇)

=== Townships ===
The sole township in Shuyang County is Xixu Township.

=== Other township-level divisions ===
Shuyang County also administers the Shuyang Economic and Technological Development Zone and the Kunshan Industrial Park (昆山工业园区).

== Demographics ==
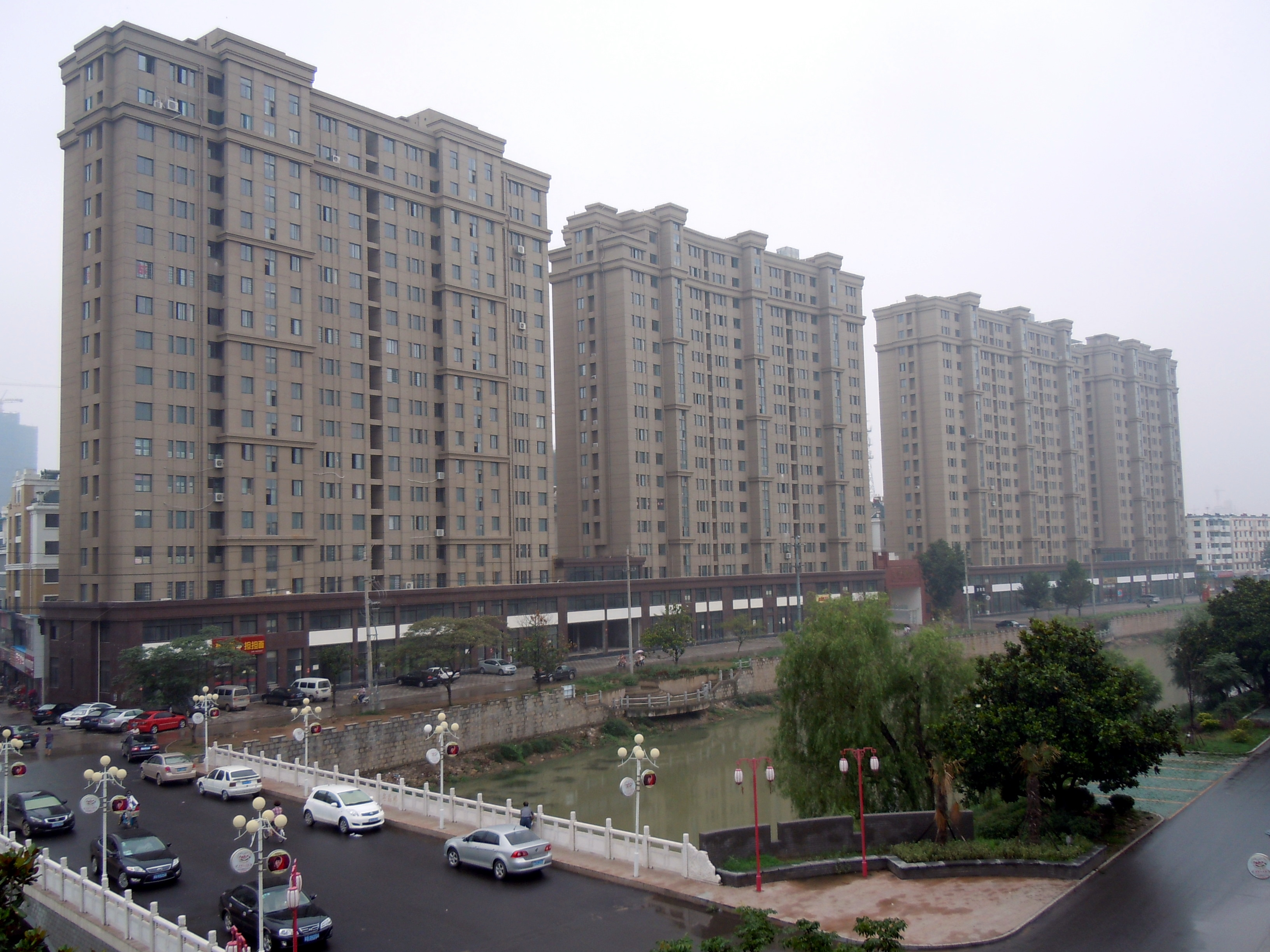
Apartments on the Shuhe Riverside

As of 2010, Shuyang County had a population of approximately 1.83 million, making it the most populous county in Jiangsu. Shuyang had a metropolitan population of more than 560,000, according to the 2010 Chinese Census. Major areas of population growth in recent years were in suburbs like Nanhu and Mengxi, which are now a part of the metropolitan area. In 2015, the urban area was expected to have a population of approximately 800,000. Some 30% of the population of the whole region are residents of the metropolitan area.

== Economy ==
Shuyang Town has over 30,000 mu (approximately 2,000 hectares) of tea plantations, accounting for about 50% of the total tea planting area in Nanjing County. In 2019, the town's 21 tea industry projects received a total of 10 million yuan in central government funding. The town has more than 50 tea processing plants, which produce over 3,000 tonnes of dried tea annually, with an annual tea output value of approximately 200 million yuan. In 2024, Shuyang Town's tea industry was selected as one of the first batch of national agricultural industrial strong towns. Agriculture in Shuyang County is highly digitalized. The value of spring tea production in Chukeng Village alone can increase by 1.2 million yuan, providing an economic benefit to local villagers. The town has also participated in rural e-commerce development, with Taobao service stations established in Qujiang, Taxia and Xiaban villages in 2015. Rural e-commerce contributed to local commercial activity, with Nanjing County's and Alibaba's "Rural Taobao program" recording more than 10,000 orders and over 1.15 million yuan in transactions on its launch day in December 2015.

As of 2018, Shuyang County had a total gross domestic product (GDP) of more than 80 billion renminbi (RMB).

Mineral resources within Shuyang County include kyanite, quartz, and clay. The county's kyanite reserves account for about a quarter of China's national reserves. The county is home to numerous so-called "Taobao villages", where a large portion of the rural population is highly engaged in e-commerce.

== Culture ==
=== Dialect ===
There are over 1.7 million people in Shuyang who speak a subdialect of Lower Yangtze Mandarin, called Haisi Dialect. Like most of Lower Yangtze Mandarin, Haisi dialect has five tones due to the preservation of the entering tone (Chinese: 入声; pinyin: rù shēng) of Middle Chinese, more than the four-toned Standard Chinese which lost the entering tone. The dialect of Haisi has largely lost the initial n, replacing it with l, and the retention of the entering tone sets it apart from other Mandarin dialects.

Speakers of the dialect can easily understand other varieties of Mandarin, but not vice versa. As Standard Chinese becomes increasingly powerful in social life, it has largely impacted on the dialect in words, pronunciation, and grammar.

=== Religions ===
Approximately 95% of the population of Shuyang County expressed no religious affiliation, according to the 2010 Chinese Census.

==== Buddhism ====
It has been unverified when the Buddhism was first introduced to Shuyang County. It might have been introduced to this region around the 2nd century to the 3rd century by sea. The oldest temple in Shuyang is the Qingliang Temple, which was built before the 9th century.

==== Christianity ====
In 1921, the Presbyterian Church in the United States started missionary work in Shuyang County. The current church was built in 1993 in the north of the urban area. The second church was to be opened in 2014.

=== Opera ===
Huaihai opera is sung in the region.

== Transportation ==
Major roads which run through Shuyang County include the G2 Beijing–Shanghai Expressway, China National Highway 205, and Jiangsu Provincial Roads 245, 304, 324, and 326.

The Xinyi–Changxing railway runs through Shuyang County. The railway connects the Longhai railway and Jiaozhou–Xinyi railway in the north with the Nanjing–Qidong railway, Beijing–Shanghai railway, and Xuancheng–Hangzhou railway in the south. Shuyang railway station, near the metropolitan area, is a third class station on the Xinyi-Changxing Railway.

Navigable rivers within Shuyang County include the Shu River, the Shuxin River, the Liutang River (Chinese: 六塘河; pinyin: Liùtáng Hé), the Qiangwei River, and the Gupo River (Chinese: 古泊河; pinyin: Gǔpō Hé). The Lianyungang-Suqian Canal connects the Lianyungang Port and the Grand Canal is under construction.

== Sister cities ==
Domestic

- Kunshan, Jiangsu
- Yiwu, Zhejiang
- Jinggangshan, Jiangxi
- Dongxiang County, Jiangxi
