= Dongying Economic Development Zone =

Chinese economic development zone

Dongying Economic Development Zone (DEDZ; Chinese: 东营经济开发区) is a provincial-level economic development zone in Dongying, Shandong, China, established in 1992. It covers an area of 65 square kilometres and is divided into "class-A" and "class-B" economic development zones. Class-A is used for machinery, electronics, new material and bioengineering, while Class-B is used for petrochemicals, chemicals and textiles.

== Accidents ==
In late August 2015, three weeks after a similar blast in Tianjin, a large explosion rocked a facility run by the Shandong Binyuan Chemical Company. Five people died; the fire was extinguished five hours later. Six company executives were arrested.
