= Xu Anxiang =

Chinese air force commander (born 1956)

- 徐安祥

Commander of the Guangzhou Military Region Air Force
- Incumbent
- Assumed office April 2013
- Preceded by: Zhang Jianping

Personal details
- Born: April 1956 (age 70) Changzhou, Jiangsu, China
- Party: Chinese Communist Party

Military service
- Allegiance: China
- Branch/service: People's Liberation Army Air Force
- Years of service: ? – present
- Rank: Lieutenant General

Xu Anxiang (Chinese: 徐安祥; born April 1956) is a lieutenant general (zhong jiang) of the Chinese People's Liberation Army Air Force (PLAAF). He has served as commander of the Guangzhou Military Region Air Force and deputy commander of the Guangzhou MR since 2013.

== Career ==
Xu Anxiang was born in April 1956 in Changzhou, Jiangsu Province.

In 2002, Xu was appointed commander of the 14th Fighter Division, a People's Liberation Army Air Force (PLAAF) unit responsible for air defense operations in the Nanjing Military Region. In 2007, he served as the frontline commander of PLAAF fighter aircraft participating in the Sino-Russian joint military exercise Peace Mission 2007, the first occasion on which PLAAF combat aircraft conducted overseas combat training. During the exercise, he commanded a contingent of J-7 fighter aircraft and Il-76 transport aircraft, overseeing multiple training sorties in unfamiliar operational conditions. The deployment marked an early milestone in the PLAAF's participation in multinational military exercises and contributed to the development of its expeditionary training capabilities.

In 2008, Xu was deputy chief of the staff of the Nanjing Military Region Air Force when the Great Sichuan earthquake occurred. He was put in charge of the Nanjing MR air force units in the search and rescue operation. He personally oversaw preparation of aircraft in the Special Rescue Regiment that received emergency mobilization orders at 10:30 p.m. on the night of the earthquake, departing 3 hours later with all necessary materials. He was later promoted to chief of staff of the Nanjing MRAF. He was promoted to commander of the Guangzhou Military Region Air Force and concurrently deputy commander of the Guangzhou MR in 2013, replacing Zhang Jianping, who had become deputy commander of the PLAAF. Xu was elevated to the rank of lieutenant general on 16 July 2014.
