= Ma Zhenjun =

- 麻振军

Deputy Commander of the PLA Air Force
- In office December 2017 – December 2021
- Commander: Ding Laihang

Chief of Staff of the PLA Air Force
- In office August 2013 – December 2017
- Preceded by: Yang Guohai

Commander of the Beijing Military Region Air Force
- In office August 2012 – August 2013
- Preceded by: Jiang Jianzeng
- Succeeded by: Zhuang Kezhu

Personal details
- Born: 1962 (age 63–64) Pingyu, Henan, China
- Party: Chinese Communist Party

Military service
- Allegiance: China
- Branch/service: People's Liberation Army Air Force
- Years of service: ? – present
- Rank: Air Force Lieutenant General

Ma Zhenjun (Chinese: 麻振军; born 1962) is a lieutenant general (zhong jiang) of the People's Liberation Army Air Force (PLAAF) of China. He has been Chief of Staff of the PLAAF since August 2013, and previously served as commander of the Beijing Military Region Air Force.

== Biography ==
Ma was born in 1962 in Pingyu, Henan Province. He enlisted in the PLAAF and served in the Guangzhou Military Region Air Force for many years.

Ma earned fast promotion after proving himself a top-grade fighter pilot, an outstanding fighter division commander, and a keen proponent of training. Instead of routine technical training, Ma emphasized tactical combat training. When he commanded the 2nd Fighter Division, it was rated as having displayed the most proficiency in training for three successive years. He also won three PLA science and technology awards.

In 2007, Ma was promoted from commander of the 2nd Fighter Division to deputy chief of staff of the Guangzhou MR Air Force, when he was 43. Two years later, he was promoted to deputy commander of the Jinan Military Region Air Force (a full corps rank) and again within one year he was transferred to the Beijing Military Region Air Force as deputy commander and chief of staff. The frequent transfers reflect the air force leadership's confidence in Ma and their crafting a succession plan for him involving gaining intimate familiarity with various MRAFs and combat units. Ma attained the rank of major general in July 2008. He was probably the only major general at the full corps rank in the air force who was born in the 1960s.

In March 2011, Ma was appointed deputy chief of staff of the PLAAF. In August 2012, he became commander of the Beijing MR Air Force and deputy commander of the Beijing MR. In August 2013, Ma was promoted to chief of staff of the PLAAF and the rank of lieutenant general.

Since December 2017, Ma was appointed to serve as deputy commander of the PLAAF.
