= 2014 Kunshan explosion =

Industrial disaster in Jiangsu, China

- Date: August 2, 2014
- Time: 7:37 a.m. (UTC+8)
- Location: Kunshan Zhongrong Metal Products Co., Ltd. Kunshan, Jiangsu, China
- Cause: Dust explosion
- Deaths: 146
- Injuries: 114

The 2014 Kunshan explosion (Chinese: 2014年昆山中荣工厂爆炸事故; pinyin: 2014 Nián Kūnshān Zhōngróng Gōngchǎng Bàozhà Shìgù) was a dust explosion that occurred at Zhongrong Metal Production Company, an automotive parts factory located in Kunshan, Jiangsu, China, on 2 August 2014. As of December 30, 2014, the explosion killed 146 workers and injured 114 others.

== Event ==
A massive explosion occurred at the factory at 7:37 a.m. At the time, more than 260 people were present, which was more than the usual number of employees working since overtime wages were doubled during the weekends. Forty-four people died at the scene of the explosion, while another 31 died at local hospitals. Five hospitals in Kunshan and nearby Suzhou treated over 180 wounded. It is believed the explosion may have been caused by flames igniting metal polishing dust.
