= Ma Xiaotian =

Chinese military officer

Air Force General Ma Xiaotian
- 马晓天 空军上将
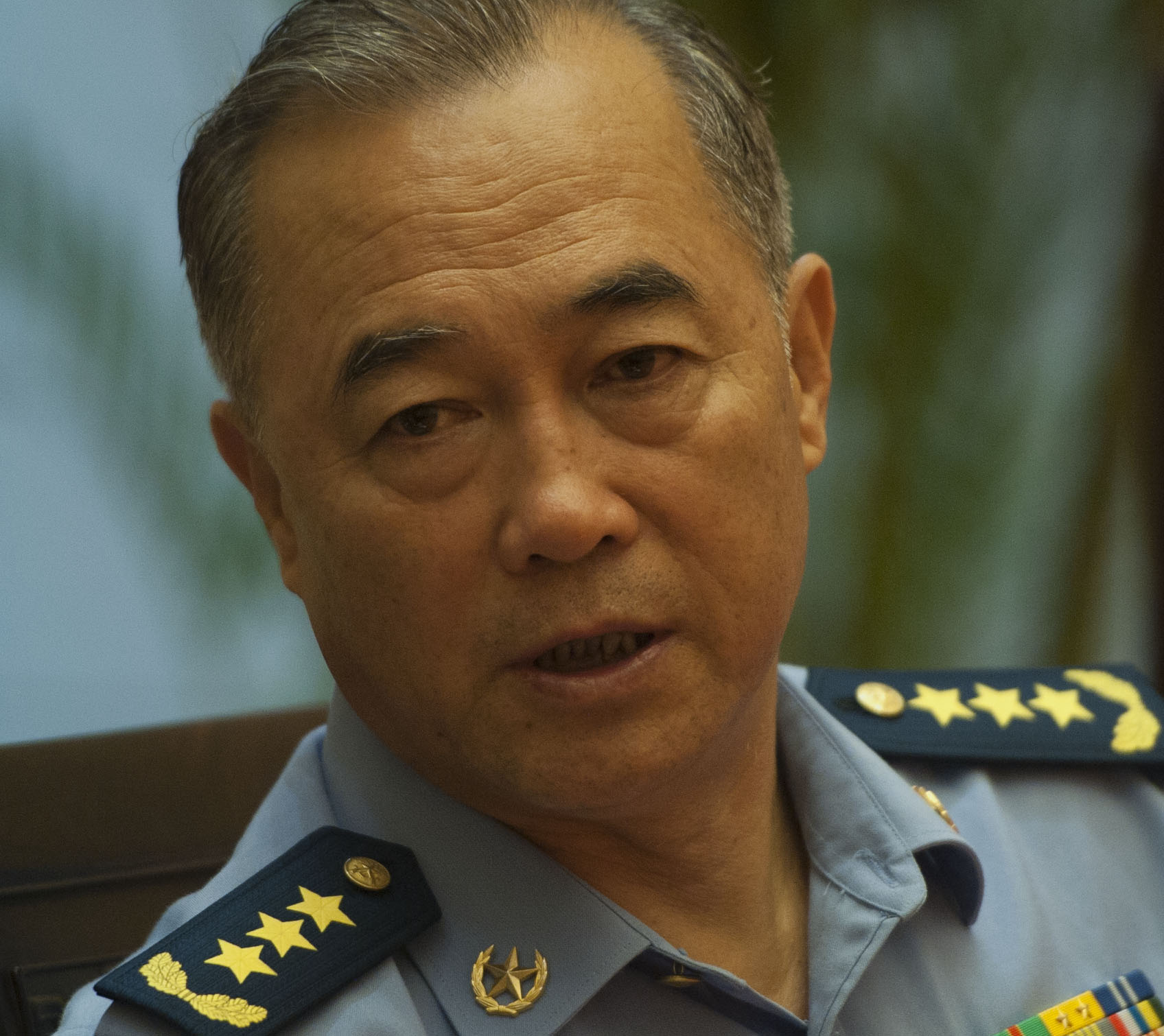
- Ma Xiaotian at the Pentagon in 2009

11th Commander of the People's Liberation Army Air Force
- In office October 2012 – August 2017
- Preceded by: Xu Qiliang
- Succeeded by: Ding Laihang

Personal details
- Born: August 1949 (age 77) Gongyi, Henan, China
- Party: Chinese Communist Party
- Education: PLA National Defence University

Military service
- Allegiance: China
- Branch/service: PLA Air Force
- Years of service: 1965–2018
- Rank: Air Force General

Chinese name
- Traditional Chinese: 馬曉天
- Simplified Chinese: 马晓天
Transcriptions
Standard Mandarin
- Hanyu Pinyin: Mǎ Xiǎotiān
- Wade–Giles: Ma Hsiao-t'ien

Ma Xiaotian (Chinese: 马晓天; born August 1949) is a retired general who served as Commander of the Chinese People's Liberation Army Air Force (PLAAF) from 2012 to 2017. He also served as Deputy Chief of the Joint Staff and President of the PLA National Defence University.

== Biography ==
Born August 1949 in Gongyi, Henan Province, Ma joined the air force in 1965, and learned to fly at the 2nd Preparatory Flight School, before formally entering the 12th Flight School the next year. After his graduation in 1968, he became a military instructor. Ma joined the Chinese Communist Party in 1969, and beginning in 1972 saw a continuous series of promotions. In 1983, he became the deputy headmaster, and was then promoted to headmaster. In 1993, Ma began studies at the PLA National Defence University. After graduating in 1994, he became the head of staff of the 10th division of the Air Force, and was later promoted to head of the division. In March 1997, Ma became the deputy head of staff of the PLA Air Force. The next year, he served as the head of staff of the Air Force of the Guangzhou Military Region. He has also served as the deputy head and the head of the Air Force of the Lanzhou Military Region. In 2001, he became the deputy head and the head of the Air Force of the Nanjing Military Region. In 2003, Ma was promoted to the deputy head of the Air Force. In 2006, he became the President of the PLA National Defence University. In 2007, he was appointed deputy chief of the Joint Staff.

He was a member of the 16th, 17th, and 18th Central Committees of the Chinese Communist Party. In July 2009 he was promoted to full general. He succeeded Xiong Guangkai as chairman of the China Institute for International Strategic Studies (CIISS).
