= Zhu Chuansheng =

- 祝传生

Acting Chief of Staff of the Joint Staff Department
- Incumbent
- Assumed office January 2026
- Preceded by: Liu Zhenli

Deputy Chief of Staff of the Joint Staff Department
- In office September 2025 – January 2026
- Preceded by: Jing Jianfeng

Commander of the People's Liberation Army Marine Corps
- In office December 2021 – September 2025
- Preceded by: Kong Jun
- Succeeded by: unknown

Personal details
- Born: April 1970 (age 56) Sheqi, Nanyang, Henan
- Party: Chinese Communist Party

Military service
- Allegiance: People's Republic of China
- Branch/service: People's Liberation Army Ground Force; People's Liberation Army Navy
- Years of service: 1987–present
- Rank: Lieutenant General
- Unit: 41st Group Army; Guangzhou Military Region; People's Liberation Army Marine Corps; Joint Staff Department

Zhu Chuansheng (Chinese: 祝传生; born April 1970) is a lieutenant general (zhongjiang) of the People's Liberation Army (PLA) who currently serves as the acting Chief of Staff of the Joint Staff Department since the purge of Zhang Youxia and Liu Zhenli.

== Biography ==
He was born in Sheqi County, Nanyang, Henan, in April 1970. He successfully served as a soldier and company commander of a unit in the 41st Group Army of the Guangzhou Military Region, chief of staff of a certain division of the Guangzhou Military Region, and commander of the PLA unit 75120 stationed in Guangxi. In April 2017, he was serving as the deputy commander of the reorganized People's Liberation Army Marine Corps as Senior Colonel. On January 9, 2018, Zhu Chuansheng was promoted to Rear Admiral. On October 1, 2019, he was appointed team leader of the amphibious assault vehicle formation during the celebrations of the 70th anniversary of the People's Republic of China. In December 2021, he succeeded Kong Jun as the Commander of the People's Liberation Army Marine Corps, who became Commander of the Eastern Theater Command Ground Force and the Theaters deputy commander. In September 2025, he accompanied Zhang Youxia to Serbia as the deputy chief of staff of the Joint Staff Department with the rank of Lieutenant General. Following the purge of Zhang Youxia and Liu Zhenli, he was the acting Chief of Staff of the Joint Staff Department in January 2026.

Military offices
Preceded by Kong Jun	Commander of the People's Liberation Army Marine Corps; 2021–2025	Succeeded by TBA
Preceded by Jing Jianfeng	Deputy Chief of Staff of the Joint Staff Department; 2025-2026	Succeeded by TBA
Preceded by Liu Zhenli	Acting Chief of Staff of the Joint Staff Department; 2026-present	Incumbent
