= LXXXXI Corps =

LXXXXI Corps, XCI Corps, or 91st Corps may refer to:

- LXXXXI Army Corps, Wehrmacht, Germany
- 91st (Flixton) Lancashire Rifle Volunteer Corps, United Kingdom

== See also ==
- List of military corps by number
- 91st Brigade (disambiguation)
- 91st Division (disambiguation)
- 91st Regiment (disambiguation)
- 91st (disambiguation)
