= People's Liberation Army Special Operations Forces =

Special operations units of China

- 中国人民解放军特种部队
- Active: 1988 – present
- Country: China
- Branch: Ground Force; Navy; Air Force; Rocket Force
- Type: Special forces
- Part of: People's Liberation Army
- March: 《特种部队之歌》 ("Anthem of the Special Forces")
- Engagements: Sino-Vietnamese war; Anti-piracy measures in Somalia

Insignia
- Sleeve badge

The People's Liberation Army Special Operations Forces refer to the various special operations units belonging to the Ground Force, Navy, Air Force and Rocket Force of the Chinese People's Liberation Army. They specialize in direct action, reconnaissance, intelligence gathering, and counter-terrorism operations.

Each theater command controls their own SOF units. The units rely on external support to conduct missions. Most ground SOF are organized like conventional light infantry units. In 2022, many units were recently converted from conventional forces and likely had capabilities closer to shock troops than special forces.

In 2022, the PLA SOF consisted of 15 Ground Force (PLAGF) brigades, one Marine Corps (PLANMC) brigade, one Airborne Corps (PLAAFAC) brigade, and the Rocket Force (PLARF) Reconnaissance Regiment.

== History ==
The first Army SOF units were created in the 1990s. At the end of the 1990s, each Military Region had an Army SOF or a special reconnaissance force of approximately 1,000 personnel.

Navy special forces deployed with the first Chinese anti-piracy naval patrol off Somalia on 26 December 2008.

After 2013, the PLA placed increased emphasis on expanding its SOF. By 2022, PLA SOF had been expanded by converting conventional forces.

== Organization ==
The PLA SOF is divided into 2000-3000 personnel brigades or 1000-2000 personnel regiments. Brigades are internally organized like conventional PLAGF brigades with the "brigade-battalion-company-team" hierarchy, which delegate less authority to team commanders. Conventional "centralized", rather than "task oriented", command style is used.

China does not have a national-level command for SOF (like the USA's SOCOM). Theater Commands control their own SOF units. Each group army contains a SOF brigade. Units have discrete missions depending on their location and branch.

Each of the SOF brigades has a semi-formal cognomen as well as a number (which is usually identical to the group army they are subordinated to). The special Xinjiang and Tibet military districts also have their own brigades. The Navy, the Air Force, and the Rocket Force all deploy their own units.

- Eastern Theater Command
  - 71st Special Forces Brigade "Sharks" (海鲨) - 71st Group Army
  - 72nd Special Forces Brigade "Thunderbolts" (霹雳) - 72nd Group Army
  - 73rd Special Forces Brigade "East Sea Flying Dragons" (东海飞龙) - 73rd Group Army - Stationed in Fujian
- Southern Theater Command:
  - 74th Special Forces Brigade "Southern Sharp Swords" (南国利剑) - 74th Group Army
  - 75th Special Forces Brigade "Jungle Tigers" (丛林猛虎) - 75th Group Army
- Western Theater Command:
  - 76th Special Forces Brigade "Xuefeng" (雪枫) (Note: the reason for the unit's rather non-fierce nickname is that it is an homage to the wartime hero Peng Xuefeng) - 76th Group Army - Formerly nicknamed the "Tigers of the Night" (暗夜之虎) and known as the Special Operations Battalion, Lanzhou Military Region.
    - 8th Company, 76th Special Forces Brigade "Sky Wolf Commandos" (天狼突击队)
  - 77th Special Forces Brigade "Southwest Cheetahs" (西南猎豹) - 77th Group Army
- Northern Theater Command
  - 78th Special Forces Brigade "Blood Wolves" (血狼) - 78th Group Army
  - 79th Special Forces Brigade "Amur Tigers" (东北虎) - 79th Group Army
  - 80th Special Forces Brigade "Taishan Eagles" (泰山雄鹰) - 80th Group Army; stationed in Tai'an, MUCD unit 71770, formerly 26th Group Army special operations brigade
- Central Theater Command
  - 81st Special Forces Brigade "Cheetahs" (獵豹) - 81st Group Army
  - 82nd Special Forces Brigade "Whistling Arrows" (响箭) - 82nd Group Army; stationed in Beijing; formerly nicknamed the "Eastern Wind Godly Sword" (东风神剑) and known as the Special Operations Battalion, Beijing Military District
  - 83rd Special Forces Brigade "Central Plains Tigers" (中原猛虎) - 83rd Group Army
- Xinjiang Military District
  - 84th Special Forces Brigade "Kunlun Sharp Blades" (昆仑利刃) - Stationed in Kashgar
- Tibet Military District
  - 85th Special Forces Brigade "Plateau Snow Leopards" (高原雪豹)
- PLA Navy Marine Corps
  - 7th Marine Brigade "Flood Dragons" (蛟龙) (Note: the jiaolong is a notoriously hard-to-translate mythical creature, so it is often simply pronounced as in Mandarin rather than translated.) - Stationed at Yulin Naval Base
- PLA Air Force Airborne Corps
  - Airborne Corps Special Forces Brigade "Thunder Gods"(雷神)
- PLA Rocket Force
  - Special Forces Unit "Sharp Blades" (利刃)

== Training ==
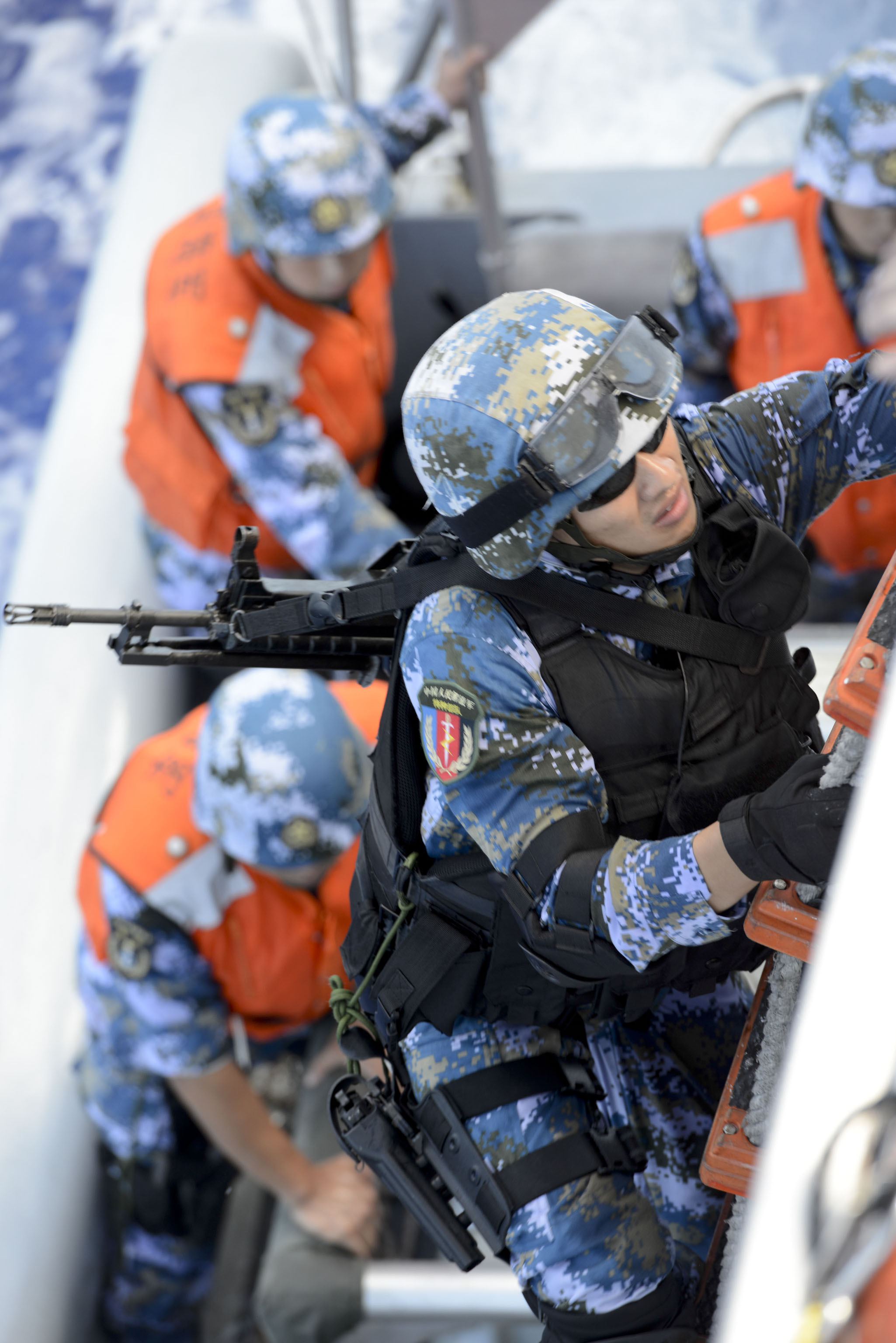
Marine special forces in 2016.

In 2014, the 82nd Special Forces Brigade acceptance criteria included passing a track and field exercises. Members received combat, mobility, infiltration and reconnaissance training.

The training of the 85th Special Force Brigade includes carrying 25 kg weights from an altitude of 3700 meters up to an altitude of 5300 meters along with completion of 6 events in 12 hours.

The selection course for the PLARF Special Forces Unit consists of:

- Running 5 km under 25 minutes while carrying 20 kg of weight
- Crossing a shaky bridge
- Crossing a 20 meters tunnel which has a diameter of 50 cm
- Lifting a tire 60 times and crossing a balance beam
- Crawling under a 25 meter long, 30 CM tall barbed wire net
- Resistance to interrogation training

== Capabilities ==
SOF receive priority for quality personnel and new equipment. All SOC units are airborne and air assault capable. According to Chen and Wuthnow in 2022, the command structure and mission of most PLA SOF brigades resembled the United States Army Rangers rather than Delta Force.

SOF has limited organic dedicated infrastructure of support. It relies on theater logistics and external resources to carry out missions. The PLAAFAC provides all SOF units with tactical insertion, extraction, and resupply. SOF operations in the enemy rear are restricted by the limited ability of conventional forces to support them. SOF and conventional brigades suffer similar problems with command and control, including communications inside SOF brigades and between SOF and conventional units.

Inter-service SOF training is rare, the most common being PLAGF SOF with PLAAF aircraft.

== Awards ==
- Antropoid 2009: the Jinan Military Region SOF group (Now the 80th Special Forces Brigade) won eight first places and six second places in 13 events.
- In the 2013 "Blade Sharpening" (砺刃—2013) military competition, which was the first ever PLASOF inter-unit competition, the 79th Special Forces Brigade won first place.
- Golden Owl 2015: the "Thunder Gods" airborne SOF wins first place.
- 2015 International Army Games: the "Thunder Gods" airborne SOF wins the "Airborne Platoon" competition.

== See also ==
- Army Special Operations Academy
