= Wang Xiubin =

Chinese general

- 王秀斌

Commander of the Southern Theater Command
- In office June 2021 – July 2024
- Preceded by: Yuan Yubai
- Succeeded by: Wu Yanan

Chief of Staff of the Eastern Theater Command
- In office April 2019 – June 2021
- Preceded by: Yang Hui
- Succeeded by: Hong Jiangqiang

Personal details
- Born: March 1964 (age 62) Rudong County, Jiangsu, China
- Party: Chinese Communist Party (expelled in 2025)

Military service
- Allegiance: People's Republic of China
- Branch/service: People's Liberation Army Ground Force
- Years of service: 1983–2025
- Rank: General

Wang Xiubin (Chinese: 王秀斌; pinyin: Wang Xiubin; born March 1964) is a general (Shangjiang) of the People's Liberation Army (PLA). He was commander of the Southern Theater Command from June 2021 to July 2024. He is an alternate of the 19th Central Committee of the Chinese Communist Party.

== Biography ==
Wang was born in Rudong County, Jiangsu, in March 1964. He enlisted in the People's Liberation Army in January 1983. He served in the 1st Group Army for a long time. He was deputy commander of the 31st Group Army in 2013 and the 1st Group Army in 2015. In 2015, he attended the 2015 China Victory Day Parade, a military parade held in Beijing to celebrate the 70th anniversary of Victory over Japan Day of World War II. In July 2016 he was promoted to become commander of the 1st Group Army, a position he held until 2017. In March 2017, he was made commander of the 80th Group Army. In April 2019, he became deputy commander of the Eastern Theater Command, concurrently holding the chief of staff position. He rose to become commander of the Southern Theater Command in June 2021.

He was promoted to the rank of major general (Shaojiang) in July 2014, lieutenant general (Zhongjiang) in December 2019, and general (Shangjiang) in July 2021.

On October 17, 2025, the Ministry of National Defense announced that Wang was expelled from the CCP and the PLA for "serious violations of discipline and law".

Military offices
Preceded by Feng Wenping	Commander of the 1st Group Army; 2016–2017	Succeeded by Position revoked
New title	Commander of the 80th Group Army; 2017–2019	Succeeded by Zheng Shoudong (郑守东)
Preceded by Yang Hui	Chief of Staff of the Eastern Theater Command; 2019–2021	Succeeded by Hong Jiangqiang
Preceded by Yuan Yubai	Commander of the Southern Theater Command; 2021–present	Succeeded by Wu Yanan
