= 91st =

91st is the ordinal form of the number 91. 91st or Ninety-first may also refer to:

- A fraction, 1/91, equal to one of 91 equal parts

== Geography ==
- 91st meridian east, a line of longitude
- 91st meridian west, a line of longitude
- 91st Street (disambiguation)

== Military ==
- 91st Brigade (disambiguation)
- 91st Division (disambiguation)
- 91st Regiment (disambiguation)

== Other ==
- 91st century
- 91st century BC

== See also ==
- 91 (disambiguation)
- April 1, 91st day of the year in a standard year
