= Ding Laifu =

Chinese military officer (born 1968)

- 丁来富

Personal details
- Born: April 1968 (age 58) Nanling County, Anhui, China
- Party: Chinese Communist Party

Military service
- Allegiance: People's Republic of China
- Branch/service: People's Liberation Army Ground Force
- Years of service: 1986–present
- Rank: Major General

Ding Laifu (Chinese: 丁来富; pinyin: Dīng Láifù; born April 1968) is a senior officer of the People's Liberation Army Ground Force (PLAGF). Before losing his positions he was commander of the 73rd Group Army of the PLAGF. In a purge against leading military officials Ding Laifu lost his position as an NPC deputy in February 2026. Reasons for that were not given.

== Biography ==
Ding was born in Nanling County, in Wuhu, Anhui in April 1968. He joined the People's Liberation Army in October 1986 and graduated from Changsha Artillery Academy in 1990. He has successively served as soldier, squad leader, platoon leader, company commander, staff officer, training section chief, battalion commander, and regiment chief of staff. In July 2004, he was appointed regiment commander. During Ding's tenure as regimental commander, the team was commended by superiors every year as a comprehensively advanced brigade and a first-level military training unit. In 2009, he served as the commander of the artillery brigade of the 12th Group Army. During his tenure as brigade commander, the brigade was commended by the military region as an advanced brigade in comprehensive construction, an advanced unit in party committee team post training, and an advanced unit in grassroots construction. It was commended by the group army as an advanced brigade in preparing for military struggle. The individual was successively commended by the Fourth Headquarters as the first "Outstanding Commanding Officer of the Army" and the 12th "Pacemaker of Learning and Talenting in the Army". He was rated as "Excellent Brigade Chief" and "Eastern Front Soldier" by the Nanjing Military Region, and was awarded the third class 9 times.

Since then, Ding has served successively as the division commander of an artillery division of the 1st Group Army and the deputy chief of staff of the 1st Army. In 2016, he served as Chief of Staff of the 16th Group Army. In March 2017, he served as the chief of staff of the newly reorganized 79th Group Army. In July 2020, he was promoted to commander of the Army's 72nd Group Army. In March 2022, he was transferred the 73rd Group Army, serving as its commander.

Ding was promoted to the rank of major general in July 2017. In February 2026 he lost his position as an NPC deputy in purge against leading military officials. Reasons for that were not given.
