= Yang Zhibin =

Chinese general

- 杨志斌

Commander of Eastern Theater Command
- Incumbent
- Assumed office December 2025
- Preceded by: Lin Xiangyang
- Political Commissar: Liu Qingsong

Personal details
- Born: April 1963 (age 63) Anyang, Henan, China
- Party: Chinese Communist Party

Military service
- Allegiance: People's Republic of China
- Branch/service: People's Liberation Army Air Force
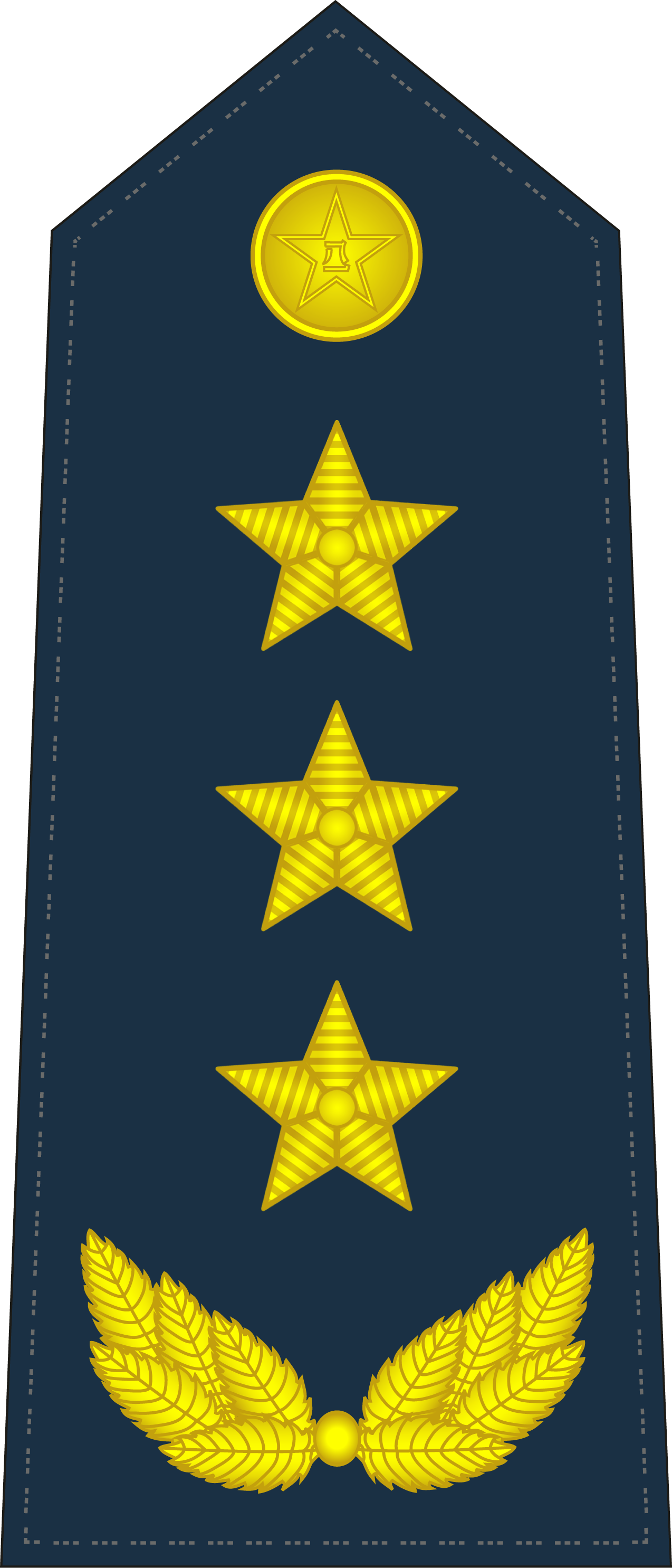
- Rank: Air Force General
- Unit: Nanjing Military Region Lanzhou Military Region Shaanxi Military District Southern Theater Command Western Theater Command Eastern Theater Command

Yang Zhibin (Chinese: 杨志斌; born April 1963) is a general (shangjiang) of the People's Liberation Army (PLA), serving as commander of the Eastern Theater Command. He previously served as deputy commander of the Western Theater Command from 2023 to 2025 and deputy commander of the Eastern Theater Command since 2025.

== Biography ==
He previously served as the commander of the 26th Aviation Division of the Nanjing Military Region Air Force before becoming commander of the Shanghai Air Force Command. In 2010, he became commander of the Wuhan Air Force Command and, in 2011, led the Fuzhou Air Force Command.

In December 2014, he was promoted to deputy chief of staff of the Lanzhou Military Region and the chief of staff of its air force. In April 2017, he became commander of the Shaanxi Provincial Military Region, and one year later, he was elected a member of the Shaanxi Provincial Standing Committee. In March 2021, he was promoted to deputy commander of the Southern Theater Command. In 2023, he was transferred to the Western Theater Command. In September 2025, he became deputy commander of the Eastern Theater Command and attended the twelfth Martyrs Memorial Day. In December 2025, he got promoted to commander of the Eastern Theater Command. Between August 29th to September 2nd, he led a delegation to the 28th Indo-Pacific Chiefs of Defence gatherings.

In July 2011, he was promoted to the rank of major general, and in March 2021, he was promoted to the rank of lieutenant general. In December 2025, he was promoted to general.

== Gallery ==
Admiral Samuel Paparo with Yang in Canada for the Asia-Pacific Defense Ministers Summit in 2026.

Military offices
Preceded by Lin Xiangyang	Commander of the Eastern Theater Command; 2025–present	Incumbent
