= Hong Jiangqiang =

Chinese general

- 洪江强

Chief of Staff of the Eastern Theater Command
- Incumbent
- Assumed office August 2021
- Commander: Lin Xiangyang
- Preceded by: Wang Xiubin

Personal details
- Born: February 1965 (age 61) Longhai, Fujian, China
- Party: Chinese Communist Party

Military service
- Allegiance: People's Republic of China
- Branch/service: People's Liberation Army Ground Force
- Years of service: 1981–present
- Rank: Lieutenant General
- Unit: 31st Group Army 79th Group Army 74th Group Army Eastern Theater Command

Chinese name
- Simplified Chinese: 洪江强
- Traditional Chinese: 洪江強
Transcriptions
Standard Mandarin
- Hanyu Pinyin: Hóngjiāng Jiàng
Southern Min
- Hokkien POJ: Âng Kang-kiâng

Hong Jiangqiang (Chinese: 洪江强; born February 1965) is a lieutenant general (zhongjiang) of the People's Liberation Army (PLA). He currently serves as the Chief of Staff of the Eastern Theater Command and is in office since August 2021.

== Biography ==
Hong Jiangqiang is born in Meishi, Longhai Gangwei in February 1965. In 1981 with 16, he was admitted to the military academy and began his military career. In 1984, he participated in the National Day military parade and was reviewed by the then paramount leader Deng Xiaoping. Hong served long time in the 31st Group Army, being the head of logistics of the group army before becoming the chief of staff of the 31st group army in 2015. In early September the same year he participated in the 2015 China Victory Day Parade, commemorating the victory against Japanese aggression, he led the heroic model unit of the "Night Attack on Yangmingbao Combat Model Company" together with major general Lin Xianyang. In March 2017 he got reassigned to the post of deputy commander of the newly formed 79th Group Army. In July 2018, he was promoted to the commander of the 74th Group Army, exactly the same month and year he served as chief referee of the "Clear Sky" air defense missile force competition in the International Military Competition-2018. In August 2021, he was promoted to deputy commander and chief of staff of Eastern Theater Command.

In 2015, he was promoted to the rank of major general, and in August 2021, he was promoted to the rank of lieutenant general.

Military offices
Preceded by Zhang Mingcai	Chief of Staff of the 31st Group Army; 2015-2017	Succeeded by Bian Xiaoming
New title	Deputy Commander of the 79th Group Army; 2017-2018	Succeeded by unknown
Preceded by Xu Xianghua	Commander of the 74th Group Army; 2018-2021	Succeeded by Huang Xucong
Preceded by Wang Xiubin	Chief of Staff of the Eastern Theater Command; 2021-present	Incumbent
