= Wu Junbao =

Chinese general

- 吴俊宝

Deputy Commander of the Eastern Theater Command
- Incumbent
- Assumed office December 2021
- Commander: Lin Xiangyang

Personal details
- Born: 1965 (age 60–61) Qianjiang County, Hubei, China
- Party: Chinese Communist Party

Military service
- Allegiance: People's Republic of China
- Branch/service: People's Liberation Army Air Force
- Rank: Lieutenant general

Chinese name
- Simplified Chinese: 吴俊宝
- Traditional Chinese: 吳俊寶
Transcriptions
Standard Mandarin
- Hanyu Pinyin: Wú Jùnbǎo

Wu Junbao (Chinese: 吴俊宝; born 1965) is a lieutenant general in the People's Liberation Army of China.

He is an alternate of the 20th Central Committee of the Chinese Communist Party.

== Biography ==
Wu was born in Qianjiang County (now Qianjiang), Hubei, in 1965.

He once served as commander of the 14th Division of the Air Force Aviation Corps of the Nanjing Military Region. He was commander of Shanghai Air Force Base in 2013, and held that office until 2017, when he deputy commander of the Central Theater Command Air Force. He was assistant to the chief of staff of the Joint Staff Department of the Central Military Commission in early 2021 and subsequently deputy commander of the Eastern Theater Command and commander of the Eastern Theater Command Air Force in December of that same year.

He was promoted to the rank of major general (shaojiang) in December 2014 and lieutenant general (zhongjiang) in December 2021.
