= Eastern Theater Command =

Military command region of China

- 东部战区
- Founded: 1 February 2016; 10 years ago
- Country: China
- Type: Theater command
- Part of: People's Liberation Army
- Headquarters: Nanjing, Jiangsu
- Website: Official website (in English)

Commanders
- Commander: General Yang Zhibin
- Political Commissar: Admiral Liu Qingsong
- Chief of Staff: Lieutenant General Hong Jiangqiang

Insignia
- Sleeve insignia

The Eastern Theater Command (Chinese: 东部战区; pinyin: Dōngbù zhànqū) is one of the five theater commands of the People's Liberation Army (PLA). The command is headquartered in Nanjing.

Founded on 1 February 2016, the command replaced the Nanjing Military Region. Its jurisdiction includes the provinces of Anhui, Fujian, Jiangsu, Jiangxi, and Zhejiang, as well as Shanghai and the East China Sea to include the Taiwan Strait. The Eastern Theater Command is primarily composed of three subordinate single-service component commands: the Eastern Theater Ground Force of the PLAGF, the East Sea Fleet of the PLAN, and the Eastern Theater Command Air Force of the PLAAF which conduct combat operations within the command's area of responsibility. Also under the Eastern Theater Command is the Wuxi Joint Logistics Support Center (JSLC) of the CMC's Joint Logistics Support Force which provides logistic and material support to the command and Base 61 of the PLARF which is responsible for missile employment in the Eastern Theater.

== Area of responsibility ==
Eastern Theater Command's area of responsibility (AOR) includes East China, the East China Sea, and the Taiwan Strait. The command's primary missions are maintaining security in the East China Sea and the conduct of major operations against Taiwan, including the Penghu, Kinmen and Matsu Islands. It is also likely responsible for matters relating to Japan, including the Ryukyu Archipelago, the Tsushima Strait and the disputed Senkaku Islands.

== History ==
On 1 February 2016, the Eastern Theater Command held its inaugural meeting in the Bayi Building in Beijing. The meeting was held concurrently with all of the other newly created theater commands. General Secretary of the CCP and Chairman of the CMC Xi Jinping was in attendance, awarding military flags and issuing the official instructions. CMC Vice Chairman and CCP Politburo Member Fan Changlong read out the orders while CMC Vice Chairman Xu Qiliang presided.

In response to the 2022 visit by United States Speaker of the House Nancy Pelosi to Taiwan, the Eastern Theater Command conducted joint ground, air, and naval military exercises including live-fire drills, missile launches over Taipei, and Taiwanese Air Defense Identification Zone (ADIZ) incursions. Another set of Chinese military exercises around Taiwan by the command began on 8 April 2023, after president Tsai visited U.S. Speaker Kevin McCarthy in California. Upon taking office, Taiwanese President Lai Ching-te stated that the Republic of China and the People's Republic of China are not subordinate to each other, prompting China to conduct military exercises codenamed Joint Sword-2024A. In October 2024, China conducted further military exercises named Joint Sword-2024B. In April 2025, China launched the Strait Thunder–2025A exercises. On 29 December, the Eastern Theater Command announced a major military exercise around Taiwan codenamed Justice Mission 2025, involving the command's land, sea, air, and rocket forces.

== Organizational structure ==
The Eastern Theater Command, like other Chinese theater commands, consists of a joint headquarters, a joint logistics support center (JSLC) from the PLA Joint Logistics Support Force, a PLA Ground Force (PLAGF) service component, a PLA Air Force (PLAAF) service component, a PLA Navy (PLAN) service component, and a PLA Rocket Force (PLARF) service component. Within Eastern Theater Command these units these are the Nanjing headquarters, Wuxi Joint Logistics Support Facility, Eastern Theater Command Ground Forces, Eastern Theater Command Air Force, Eastern Fleet, and Base 61.

=== Headquarters ===
Located in Nanjing, capital of Jiangsu Province, the Eastern Theater Command headquarters includes both the General Staff Department, responsible for staff support to command leadership, and the Political Works Department, providing the Chinese Communist Party (CCP) oversight and influence within the command. The command's General Staff Department (参谋部; Cānmóu Bù) consists of at least eight sections: combat bureau, intelligence bureau, information assurance agency, military demand bureau, joint training board, mobilization bureau, work department bureau, work direction bureau, and war service bureau. The command's Political Works Department (政治工作部; Zhèngzhì Gōngzuò Bù) consists of at least six bureaus: general, organization, cadre, military and civilian, publicity, and group workers liaison bureau.

=== PLA Ground Force ===
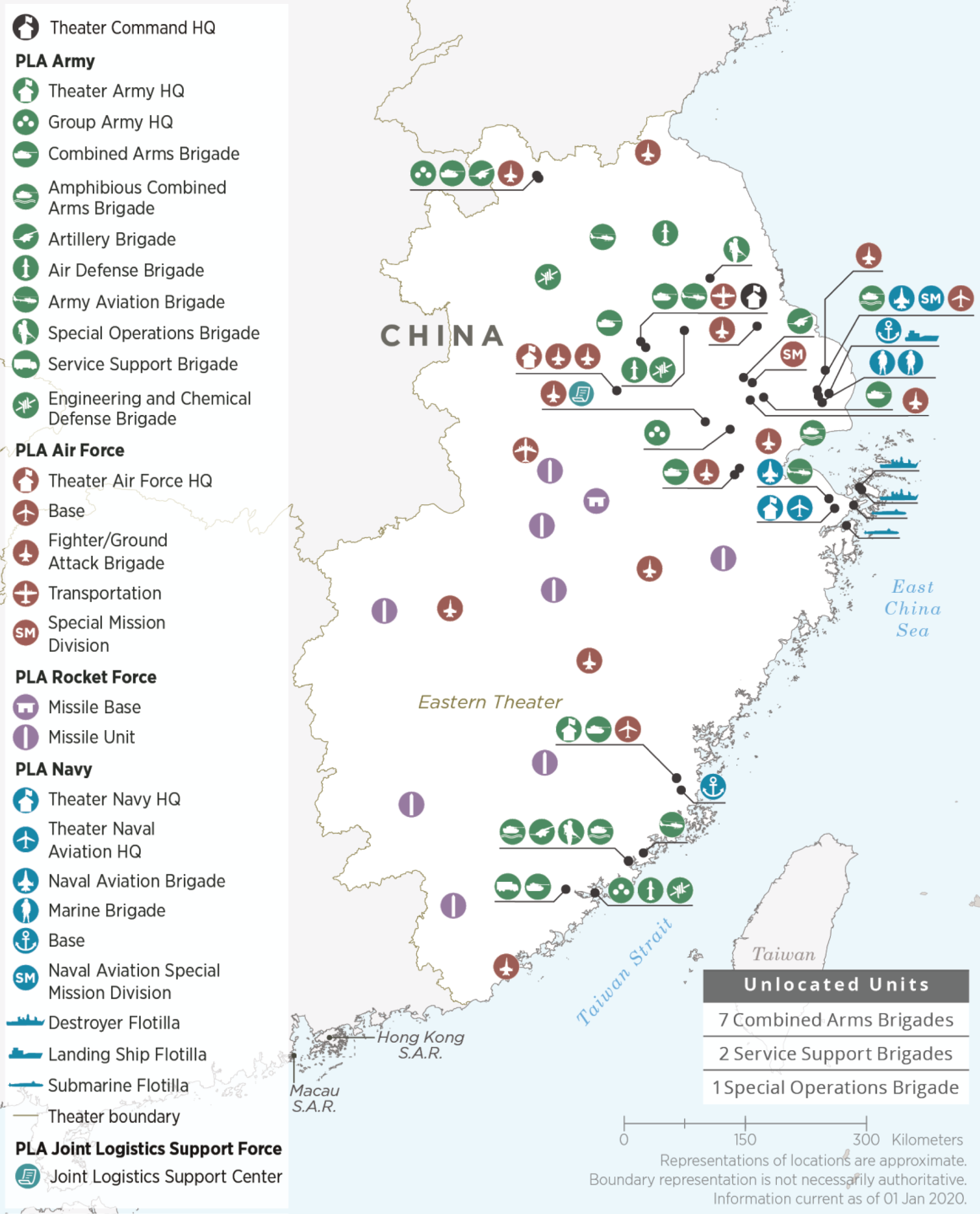
Map of Eastern Theater Command units

The PLA Ground Force (PLAGF) component of Eastern Theater Command is composed of three major units: The 71st, 72nd, and 73rd Group Army. Since 2017 reforms, the PLAGF group army represents a more evolved, flexible, and capable operational organization that provides Chinese military decision makers with the ability to task-organize forces to accomplish specific missions. Each group army doctrinally commands twelve brigades: six combined-arms brigades (CA-BDEs) and six support brigades including aviation, artillery, air defense, CBRN, special operations forces (SOF), and others. Its commander is Kong Jun (孔军) who formerly served as the first commander of the PLA Marine Corps.

==== Directly Subordinate Units ====
- 301st Coastal Defense Brigade (海防第301旅) (Nantong, Jiangsu)
- 302nd Coastal Defense Brigade (海防第302旅) (Zhoushan, Zhejiang)
  - 302nd Brigade's Boat Group (302旅船艇大队)
- 303rd Coastal Defense Brigade (海防第303旅) (Changle, Fujian)
  - 303rd Brigade's Boat Group (303旅船艇大队)
- 304th Coastal Defense Brigade (海防第304旅) (Xiamen, Fujian)
  - 304th Brigade's Boat Group (304旅船艇大队)
- 31st Pontoon Bridge Brigade (舟桥31旅) (Nanjing, Jiangsu
- 1st Long Distance Rocket Artillery Brigade (远程火箭炮兵第1旅) (Wuxi, Jiangsu)
- 1st Information Surveillance Brigade (情报侦察第1旅) (Xiamen, Fujian)
- 1st Communication Support Brigade (信息保障第1旅) (Xuzhou, Jiangsu; Mawei, Fujian)
- 1st Brigade Electronic Counter Measures (电子对抗第1旅) (Xiamen, Fujian)

==== 71st Group Army ====
The 71st Group Army (第七十一集团军) traces its history back to the 12th Corps, a February 1949 consolidation of the 34th, 35th, and 36th Divisions. In December 1950, the 12th Corps incorporated the 31st Division of the 11th Corps and entered the Korean War, fighting in the Shangganling Campaign against two United Nations divisions. In May 1989, the Central Military Commission mobilized at least 14 of the PLA's 24 group armies to enforce martial law against student-led protests in Tiananmen Square from five of the seven military regions, a larger force than had been mobilized for China's border wars with Vietnam, India, or the Soviet Union. The Nanjing Military Region, predecessor to the Eastern Theater Command, airlifted the 34th, 36th, and 110th Infantry Divisions, an artillery brigade, and an anti-aircraft battalion from the 12th Corps following Xu Qinxian's refusal to mobilize the 38th Army in Beijing. In 2017 the 12th Corps was disbanded and replaced by the 71st Group Army as China replaced their seven military regions with five theater commands.

Headquartered in Xuzhou, Jiangsu, the composition of the 71st Group Army matches the Chinese doctrinal group army structure commanding six combined-arms brigades and seven support brigades. The 71st Group Army is understood to consist of the below units. Note, the PLAGF uniquely identifies support brigades using the same unit number as the parent group army.

- Headquarters
- 2nd Heavy Combined-Arms Brigade
- 35th Heavy Combined-Arms Brigade
- 160th Heavy Combined-Arms Brigade
- 235th Heavy Combined-Arms Brigade
- 178th Medium Combined-Arms Brigade
- 179th Light Combined-Arms Brigade
- 71st Army Aviation Brigade
- 71st Artillery Brigade
- 71st Air Defense Brigade
- 71st Special Operations Brigade
- 71st Service Support Brigade

==== 72nd Group Army ====
The 72nd Group Army (第七十二集团军), headquartered in Huzhou, Zhejiang Province, originates from the 1930 activation of the 2nd Red Army in Hunan which took part in Mao's famous Long March. The 2nd Red Army was reorganized and redesignated as the 1st Corps in February 1947 taking an active role in the Chinese Civil War include in the battles for Shanzong, Fumei, and Longdong. In April 1953, 1st Corps was deployed to the Korean War but returned to China after only a few months with the conflict's cessation. In 2017, with the transformation of military regions to theater commands, the PLAGF 1st Corps was reorganized and redesignated as the 72nd Ground Army. The 72nd Group Army is understood to consist of the below units.

- Headquarters
- 10th Heavy Combined-Arms Brigade
- 5th Amphibious Combined-Arms Brigade
- 124th Amphibious Combined-Arms Brigade
- 85th Medium Combined-Arms Brigade
- 90th Light Combined-Arms Brigade
- 72nd Army Aviation Brigade
- 72nd Artillery Brigade
- 72nd Air Defense Brigade
- 72nd Special Operations Brigade
- 72nd Service Support Brigade

==== 73rd Group Army ====
The 73rd Group Army (第七十三集团军) is headquartered in Bantou, Jimei District, Xiamen, in Fujian Province – directly across the strait from Taiwan. The 73rd Group Army's history begins in 1941 with the Shantung Column of the Shangtung Military Region. Undergoing a number of restructures and redesignations throughout the 1940s, eventually to become the 31st Corps. Unlike the predecessors of the 71st and 72nd Group Armies (12th and 1st Corps) of the Eastern Theater Command, the 73rd Group Army's predecessor (the 31st Corps) was not selected to deploy in the early 1950s Korean War and remained in Fujian Province to defend China against a potential US-Taiwan invasion. Later in 1958, the 31st Corps took part in the artillery bombardment of the Republic of China's Kinmen (Quemoy) and Matsu Islands precipitating the Second Taiwan Strait Crisis. As the 12th Corps and 1st Corps were reorganized and redesignated as the 71st and 72nd Army Groups in China's 2015–2017 military reforms, the 31st Corps became the 73rd Army Group. As one of two group armies in the Eastern Theater Command with amphibious combined-arms brigades, the 73rd Group has been prominently featured by Chinese media conducting amphibious landing drills in Fujian Province demonstrating its capability to take part in the use of force against Taiwan. The 73rd Group Army is understood to consists of the below units.

- Headquarters
- 86th Heavy Combined-Arms Brigade
- 14th Amphibious Combined-Arms Brigade
- 91st Amphibious Combined-Arms Brigade
- 145th Medium Combined-Arms Brigade
- 3rd Light Combined-Arms Brigade
- 73rd Army Aviation Brigade
- 73rd Artillery Brigade
- 73rd Air Defense Brigade
- 73rd Special Operations Brigade
- 73rd Service Support Brigade

=== PLA Air Force ===
The Eastern Theater Command Air Force is the People's Liberation Army Air Force (PLAAF) component of Eastern Theater Command and is led by commander Wu Junbao (吴俊宝) who took office in December 2021 and political commissar Lieutenant General Zhong Weiguo (钟卫国) who took office in June 2019.

The PLAAF has largely disestablished divisions and converted their subordinate regiments to brigades. With only the 10th Bomber Division remaining as a division, the Eastern Theater Command Air Force is composed of the following units.

- 8th Fighter Brigade
- 9th Fighter Brigade
- 25th Fighter Brigade
- 40th Fighter Brigade
- 41st Fighter Brigade
- 78th Fighter Brigade
- 83rd Fighter Brigade
- 85th Fighter Brigade
- 95th Fighter Brigade
- 10th Bomber Division
  - 28th Bomber Regiment
  - 29th Bomber Regiment
  - 30th Bomber Regiment
- 76th Air Regiment
- 77th Air Regiment
- 93rd Regiment
- Unidentified drone attack brigade

=== PLA Navy ===
The East Sea Fleet is a component of the Eastern Theater Command and one of the three Naval Fleets of the People's Liberation Army Navy. Its current commander is Vice Admiral Wang Zhongcai (王仲才) and Vice Admiral Mei Wen (梅文) is its political commissar.

- Eastern Theater Command Navy (East Sea Fleet)
  - Ningbo Fleet Headquarters
  - Shanghai Naval Base
  - Xiangshan Naval Base
  - Zhoushan Naval Base
  - Fujian Naval Base
- 1st Coastal Defense Brigade (Shanghai)
- 2nd Coastal Defense Brigade (Shanghai)
- Coastal Defense Brigade (Fujian)
- 13th Coastal Defense Division, (Jinjiang, Quanzhou)
- 31st Pontoon Bridge Brigade

==== PLA Naval Air Force ====
- 1st Air Division (Shanghai)
- 17th Air Regiment (Changzhou)
- 5th Independent Bomber Regiment (Changzhou)
- 4th Naval Aviation Brigade (Taizhou)
- 11th Air Regiment (Ningbo)
- 18th Air Regiment (JH-7)

=== PLA Rocket Force ===
The People's Liberation Army Rocket Force (PLARF) component of Eastern Theater Command is Base 61 in Huangshan, Anhui. Base 61 has been regarded as the PLARF's "premier conventional base opposite Taiwan" where a number of senior PLARF leadership were likely to have been stationed. Base 61 traces its origins back to August 1965 with the establishment of Unit 121 in Guangyang Township, Shitai County which was responsible for the construction of missile silos under the PLA's Second Artillery Corps (predecessor to the PLARF) and led by Liao Changmei (Chinese: 廖成美). PLA Rocket Force 61st Base (Huangshan City, Anhui Province) The unit was converted into the Project 303 headquarters in June 1966 and remained until 25 May 1968 when the Central Military Commission renamed the headquarters to Base 52 of the Second Artillery Corps, the PLARF component of the Nanjing Military Region (predecessor to the Eastern Theater Command). PLA Rocket Force 61st Base (Huangshan City, Anhui Province) Base 52 comprised the 807th, 811th, 815th, 817th, 818th, 819th, 820th, and 827th Brigades armed with DF-21, DF-15C, DF-15A, DF-11A, CJ-10A, and DF-21C ballistic missiles. PLA Rocket Force 61st Base (Huangshan City, Anhui Province) In 2016 the newly established PLARF took command of Base 52 which would be redesignated as Base 61 and its subordinate brigades renamed 611 to 618.

PLARF Units of the Eastern Theater Command
Brigade	Chinese name	Missile type	City	Province
Base 61 Headquarters			Huangshan	Anhui
611	六十一基地611旅	DF-21A	Chizhou	Anhui
612	六十一基地612旅	DF-21 or DF-21A	Jingdezhen	Jiangxi
613	六十一基地613旅	DF-15B	Shangrao	Anhui
614	六十一基地614旅	DF-11A or DF-17	Yong'an	Fujian
615	六十一基地615旅	DF-11A	Meizhou	Guangdong
616	六十一基地616旅	DF-15	Ganzhou	Jiangxi
617	六十一基地617旅	DF-16	Jinhua	Zhejiang
618	六十一基地618旅	Unknown	Unknown	Unknown

== List of leaders ==
=== Commanders ===
English name	Chinese name	Took office	Left office	Notes
Liu Yuejun	刘粤军	February 2016	December 2019	
He Weidong	何卫东	December 2019	January 2022	
Lin Xiangyang	林向阳	January 2022	October 2025	
Yang Zhibin	杨志斌	October 2025	Incumbent	

=== Political commissars ===
English name	Chinese name	Took office	Left office	Notes
Zheng Weiping	郑卫平	February 2016	September 2017	
He Ping	何平	September 2017	June 2023	
Liu Qingsong	刘青松	June 2023	Incumbent	

== See also ==
- Eastern Theater Command Air Force
- Eastern Theater Command Ground Force
- Eastern Theater Command Navy
- Republic of China Armed Forces
