= Eastern Theater Command Ground Force =

- 中国人民解放军东部战区陆军
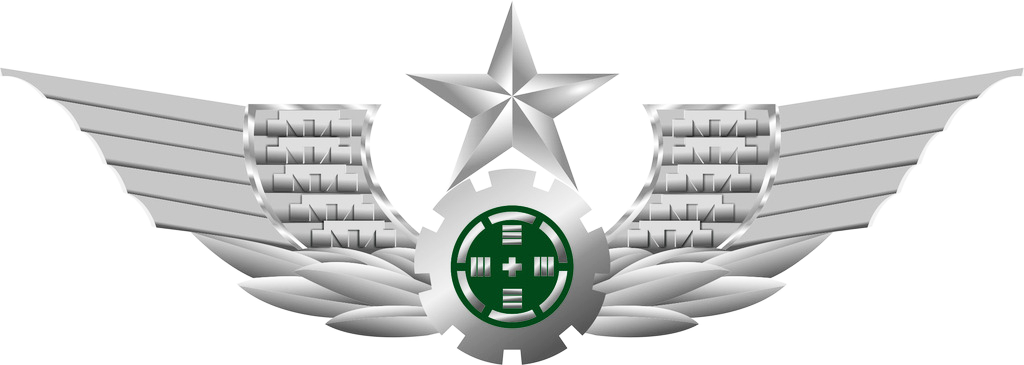
- Emblem of the People's Liberation Army Ground Force
- Active: 2016–present
- Country: China
- Allegiance: Chinese Communist Party
- Branch: People's Liberation Army Ground Force
- Part of: Eastern Theater Command
- Garrison/HQ: Fuzhou, Fujian
- Mottos: 为人民服务 "Serve the People"
- Colors: Red and Green
- March: Military Anthem of the People's Liberation Army

Commanders
- Commander: Lieutenant General Kong Jun

Eastern Theater Command Ground Force
- Eastern Theater Command
- Simplified Chinese: 中国人民解放军东部战区陆军
- Traditional Chinese: 中國人民解放軍東部戰區陸軍
Transcriptions
Standard Mandarin
- Hanyu Pinyin: Zhōngguó Rénmín Jiěfàngjūn Dōngbù Zhànqū Lùjūn

The Eastern Theater Command Ground Force is the ground force under the Eastern Theater Command. Its headquarters is in Fuzhou, Fujian. The current commander is Kong Jun and the current political commissar is Zhang Hongbing.

== History ==
The Eastern Theater Command Ground Force was officially established on 31 December 2015 with the troops of former Nanjing Military Region.

== Functional department ==
- General Staff
- Political Work Department
- Logistics Department
- Equipment department
- Disciplinary Inspection Committee

== Direct units ==
- PLA Ground Force Sanjie Joint Tactic Training Base
- PLA Ground Force First Comprehensive Training Base
- PLA Ground Force Second Comprehensive Training Base

== Direct troops ==
=== Group army ===
- 71st Group Army (stations in Xuzhou, Jiangsu)
- 72nd Group Army (stations in Huzhou, Zhejiang)
- 73rd Group Army (stations in Xiamen, Fujian)

=== Other army ===
- 1st Reconnaissance and Intelligence Brigade
- First Brigade of Information Support
- First Brigade of Electronic Warfare
- First Brigade of Long Range Rocket Artillery
- 31st Brigade of Boat and Bridge Army
- 301st Coastal defense brigade (stationed in Haimen District of Nantong, Jiangsu)
- 302nd Coastal defense brigade (stationed in Zhoushan, Zhejiang)
- 303rd Coastal defense brigade (stationed in Changle District of Fuzhou, Fujian)
- 304th Coastal defense brigade (stationed in Xiamen, Fujian)

== List of leaders ==
=== Commanders ===
English name	Chinese name	Took office	Left office	Notes
Qin Weijiang	秦卫江	2016	December 2018	
Xu Qiling	徐起零	December 2018	April 2020	
Lin Xiangyang	林向阳	April 2020	August 2021	
Kong Jun	孔军	December 2021		

=== Political commissars ===
English name	Chinese name	Took office	Left office	Notes
Liao Keduo	廖可铎	2016	April 2019	
Zhang Hongbing	张红兵	December 2019	January 2022	

=== Chiefs of staff ===
English name	Chinese name	Took office	Left office	Notes
Zhang Jian	张践	2016	2017	
Zhou Youya	周友亚	2018	2020	
