= Lin Xiangyang =

Chinese military officer

- 林向阳
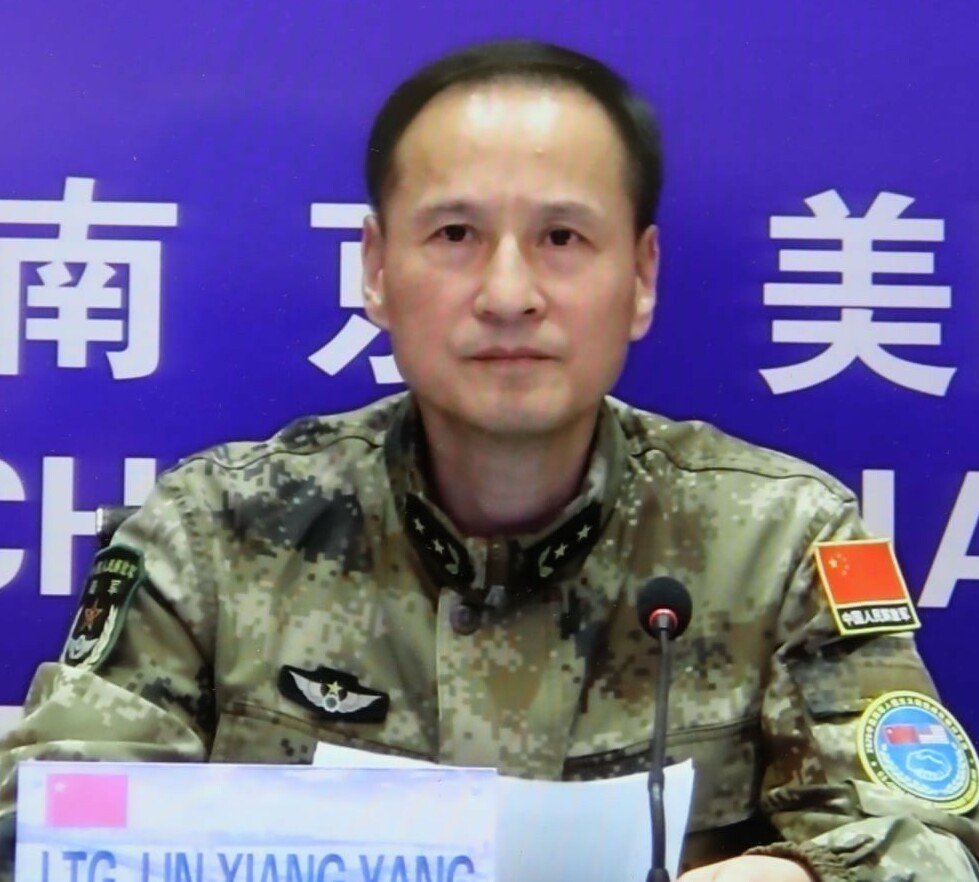
- Lin at a US–China military exchange

Commander of Eastern Theater Command
- In office January 2022 – October 2025
- Preceded by: He Weidong
- Succeeded by: Yang Zhibin

Commander of Central Theater Command
- In office August 2021 – January 2022
- Preceded by: Yi Xiaoguang
- Succeeded by: Wu Yanan

Commander of Eastern Theater Command Ground Force
- In office April 2020 – August 2021
- Preceded by: Xu Qiling
- Succeeded by: Kong Jun

Personal details
- Born: October 1964 (age 61–62) Haikou, Fuqing, Fuzhou, Fujian
- Party: Chinese Communist Party (expelled in 2025)
- Education: PLA Army Infantry Academy

Military service
- Allegiance: People's Republic of China
- Branch/service: People's Liberation Army Ground Force
- Years of service: 1982–2025
- Rank: General

Chinese name
- Simplified Chinese: 林向阳
- Traditional Chinese: 林向陽
Transcriptions
Standard Mandarin
- Hanyu Pinyin: Lín Xiàngyáng
Eastern Min
- Fuzhou BUC: Lìng Hióng-iòng

Lin Xiangyang (Chinese: 林向阳; born October 1964) is a former general (shangjiang) of the People's Liberation Army (PLA) who served as the commander of Eastern Theater Command from 2022 to 2025.

== Biography ==
Born in the town of Haikou, Fuqing, Fujian, in October 1964, he graduated from PLA Army Infantry Academy. He was deputy commander of the 31st Group Army before serving as commander of the 47th Group Army in 2016. He was commander of the newly founded 82nd Group Army in March 2017, and held that office until April 2019, when he was appointed commander of the 72nd Group Army. He became commander of Eastern Theater Command Ground Force in April 2020, and served until August 2021. In August 2021, he rose to become commander of Central Theater Command, replacing Yi Xiaoguang. In January 2022, he was assigned as commander of Eastern Theater Command.

He was promoted to the rank of lieutenant general (zhongjiang) in July 2020 and general (shangjiang) in September 2021.

On October 17, 2025, the Ministry of National Defense announced that he was expelled from the CCP and the PLA for "serious violations of discipline and law".

Military offices
Preceded by Zhang Lianyi	Commander of the 47th Group Army; 2016–2017	Succeeded by Position revoked
New title	Commander of the 82nd Group Army; 2017–2019	Succeeded by Duan Yingmin
Preceded by Zheng Shoudong	Commander of the 72nd Group Army; 2019–2020	Succeeded by Ding Laifu
Preceded by Xu Qiling	Commander of Eastern Theater Command Ground Force; 2020–2021	Succeeded by Kong Jun
Preceded by Yi Xiaoguang	Commander of Central Theater Command; 2021–2022	Succeeded by Wu Yanan
Preceded by He Weidong	Commander of Eastern Theater Command; 2022–2025	Succeeded by Yang Zhibin
