= Chinese Marine Corps =

Chinese Marine Corps may refer to:

- Republic of China Marine Corps
- People's Liberation Army Marine Corps
- People's Liberation Army Amphibious Brigades
