= Kong Jun =

- 孔军

Commander of the Eastern Theater Command Ground Force
- Incumbent
- Assumed office December 2021
- Preceded by: Lin Xiangyang

Commander of the People's Liberation Army Navy Marine Corps
- In office April 2017 – December 2021
- Preceded by: New title
- Succeeded by: TBA

Personal details
- Born: July 1964 (age 61) Hanjiang County, Jiangsu, China
- Party: Chinese Communist Party

Military service
- Allegiance: People's Republic of China
- Branch/service: People's Liberation Army Navy
- Years of service: –
- Rank: Lieutenant general

Chinese name
- Simplified Chinese: 孔军
- Traditional Chinese: 孔軍
Transcriptions
Standard Mandarin
- Hanyu Pinyin: Kǒng Jūn

Kong Jun (Chinese: 孔军; born July 1964) is a lieutenant general (zhongjiang) of the People's Liberation Army (PLA) serving as commander of the Eastern Theater Command Ground Force, succeeding Lin Xiangyang in December 2021. Previously he served as commander of the People's Liberation Army Navy Marine Corps. He is a delegate to the 13th National People's Congress.

== Biography ==
Kong was born in Hanjiang County (now Hanjiang District, Yangzhou), Jiangsu, in July 1964. He served in the Nanjing Military Region for a long time. In January 2016, he became chief of staff of the 12th Group Army, replacing Zheng Min (郑敏). In April 2017, he was appointed commander of the newly founded People's Liberation Army Navy Marine Corps, he remained in that position until December 2021, when he was commissioned as commander of the Eastern Theater Command Ground Force.

Military offices
Preceded by Zheng Min (郑敏)	Chief of Staff of the 12th Group Army; 2016–2017	Succeeded by Position revoked
New title	Commander of the People's Liberation Army Navy Marine Corps; 2017–2021	Succeeded by TBA
Preceded by Lin Xiangyang	Commander of the Eastern Theater Command Ground Force; 2021–present	Incumbent
