= Jing Jianfeng =

Chinese general

- 景建峰

Deputy Chief of Staff of the Joint Staff Department
- Incumbent
- Assumed office December 2021
- Preceded by: Chang Dingqiu

Commander of the Eastern Theater Command Air Force
- In office August 2021 – December 2021
- Preceded by: Huang Guoxian
- Succeeded by: Wu Junbao

Personal details
- Born: 1966 (age 59–60) Changxing, Zhejiang, China
- Party: Chinese Communist Party

Military service
- Allegiance: People's Republic of China
- Branch/service: People's Liberation Army Air Force
- Years of service: ?-present
- Rank: Lieutenant general
- Unit: Eastern Theater Command Air Force Eastern Theater Command Joint Staff Department

Jing Jianfeng (Chinese: 景建峰; born 1966) is a lieutenant general (zhongjiang) of the People's Liberation Army (PLA) who is currently serving as deputy chief of staff of the Joint Staff Department.

== Biography ==
Born in Changxing County, Zhejiang, in 1966. He previously served as the commander of the 3rd Air Division of the Air Force. He then served as a deputy commander of an Air Force Test & Training Base. In January 2017, he was promoted to the rank of major general. He also served as the chief director of the "Red Sword-2018" exercise. In 2018, he was appointed Chief of Staff of the Eastern Theater Command Air Force and three years later to its commander. Following his appointment was also his promotion to the rank of Lieutenant General, in August 2021. Four months later, in December 2021 he was reassigned to the position as deputy chief of staff of the Joint Staff Department. In October 2022, it was revealed that he was an alternate member of the 20th Central Committee of the Chinese Communist Party. He also attended as part of the Chinese military delegation in the 20th Shangri-La Dialogue in Singapore. He also met with Singaporen Defense Minister Lee Sang Hock and Dr Ng Eng Hen where he signed an Memoroandum of Understanding which would establish a defence hotline between Singapore and China. In July 2023 he was part of a delegation to hold talks with their Japanese counterpart after four years to underline the importance of dialogue between the Japanese Self-Defense Force and the People's Liberation Army. There he met with Cmdr. Atsushi Yanagita. In November 2023 he attended the opening ceremony of "Peace and Friendship-2023" multinational joint exercise, opened in Zhanjiang, Guangdong. Participating officers and soldiers were coming from the Chinese, Vietnamnese, Laotian, Cambodian, Thai and Malaysian Armed Forces. In 2024 he was again part of the 21st Shangri-La Dialogue where he met with NATO Military Committee Chairman Rob Bauer. In June 2024 he was part of a Chinese delegation that went to Saudi Arabia to discuss bilateral relations and to bolster their strategic defense partnership to meet common interests. Also part of the Chinese delegations were Defense Minister and Admiral Dong Jun, part of the Saudi Delegation was the Chief of the General Staff Fayyad Al-Ruwaili.

Military offices
Preceded by Huang Guoxian	Commander of the Eastern Theater Command Air Force; 2021-2021	Succeeded by Wu Junbao
Preceded by Chang Dingqiu	Deputy Chief of Staff of the Joint Staff Department; 2021-present	Incumbent
