= Eastern Theater Command Air Force =

Air forces of the People's Liberation Army's Eastern Theater Command

- 中国人民解放军东部战区空军
- Emblem of the People's Liberation Army Air Force
- Active: 2016–present
- Country: China
- Allegiance: Chinese Communist Party
- Branch: People's Liberation Army Air Force
- Garrison/HQ: Nanjing, Jiangsu
- Mottos: 为人民服务 "Serve the People"
- Colors: Red and Blue
- March: March of the Chinese Air Force

Commanders
- Commander: Lieutenant General Wu Junbao
- Political Commissar: Lieutenant General Zhong Weiguo

Eastern Theater Command Air Force
- Eastern Theater Command
- Simplified Chinese: 中国人民解放军东部战区空军
- Traditional Chinese: 中國人民解放軍東部戰區空軍
Transcriptions
Standard Mandarin
- Hanyu Pinyin: Zhōngguó Rénmín Jiěfàngjūn Dōngbù Zhànqū Kōngjūn

The Eastern Theater Command Air Force is the air force under the Eastern Theater Command. Its headquarters is in Nanjing, Jiangsu. The current commander is Wu Junbao and the current political commissar is Zhong Weiguo.

== History ==
On 1 February 2016, the founding meeting of the Eastern Theater Command Air Force was held at the August First Building in Beijing, China.

== Functional department ==
- General Staff
- Political Work Department
- Logistics Department
- Disciplinary Inspection Committee

== Direct units ==
- PLA Air Force Training Base

== Bases and brigades ==
- PLA Air Force Shanghai Headquarter Base
- PLA Air Force Fuzhou Headquarter Base
- Shuimen Air Base
- Wuyishan Airport
- Quanzhou Jinjiang International Airport
- Fuzhou Yixu Air Base

Aviation unit	Home Base	Serials Range	Aircraft Type	Remarks
7th Aviation Brigade	Jiaxing City Jiaxing Airport	61X8X	J-16	Shanghai Base
8th Fighter Brigade	Changxing County, Huzhou City, Zhejiang / Changxing 83 Airport	61X9X	J-20	Shanghai Base
9th Fighter Brigade	Wuhu Wanli Airport	62X0X	J-20	Shanghai Base (First Regiment: Wang Hai Brigade)
25th Aviation Brigade	Guangdong Shantou City Shantou Waisha Airport	63X6X	J-10C	Fuzhou Base
40th Aviation Brigade	Jiangxi Nanchang City / Nanchang Xiangtang Airport	65X1X	J-16	Fuzhou Base
41st Aviation Brigade	Fujian Wuyishan City Wuyishan Airport	65X2X	J-11A	Fuzhou base
78th Fighter Brigade	Chongming Airport	68X9X	J-16	Shanghai Base
83rd Aviation Brigade	Hangzhou, Zhejiang / Jianqiao Airport	69X4X	JH-7A	Shanghai Base
95th Aviation Brigade	Jiangsu Lianyungang City / Baitabu Airport	70X6X	J-11B	Shanghai Base
85th Fighter Brigade	Zhejiang Quzhou City / Quzhou Airport	69X6X	Su-30MKK	Fuzhou Base

== List of leaders ==
=== Commanders ===
English name	Chinese name	Took office	Left office	Notes
Huang Guoxian	黄国显	February 2016	June 2021	
Jing Jianfeng	景建峰	August 2021	December 2021	
Wu Junbao	吴俊宝	December 2021		

=== Political commissars ===
English name	Chinese name	Took office	Left office	Notes
Liu Dewei	刘德伟	February 2016	July 2018	
Yuan Huazhi	袁华智	December 2018	April 2019	
Zhong Weiguo	钟卫国	June 2019		

=== Chiefs of staff ===
English name	Chinese name	Took office	Left office	Notes
Xu Xueqiang	许学强	2016	August 2017	
Jing Jianfeng	景建峰	2018	August 2021	
