= 301st Brigade =

301st Brigade may refer to:

- 301st Coastal Defence Brigade, People's Republic of China
- 301st Anti-aircraft Missile Brigade, Ukraine
- 301st Brigade, Royal Field Artillery, United Kingdom
- 301st Infantry Brigade (United Kingdom)
- 301st Maneuver Enhancement Brigade, United States

== See also ==
- 301st Regiment (disambiguation)
- 301st (disambiguation)
