= Zheng Xuan (general) =

- 郑璇

Political Commissar of the Northern Theater Command
- Incumbent
- Assumed office June 2023
- Preceded by: Liu Qingsong

Personal details
- Born: November 1964 (age 61) Minhou County, Fujian, China
- Party: Chinese Communist Party
- Education: People's Liberation Army National Defence University

Military service
- Allegiance: People's Republic of China
- Branch/service: People's Liberation Army Ground Force
- Years of service: 1976–present
- Rank: General

Chinese name
- Simplified Chinese: 郑璇
- Traditional Chinese: 鄭璇
Transcriptions
Standard Mandarin
- Hanyu Pinyin: Zhèng Xuán

Zheng Xuan (Chinese: 郑璇; born November 1964) is a general in the People's Liberation Army of China, currently serving as political commissar of the Northern Theater Command, in office since June 2023.

Zheng was a representative of the 19th National Congress of the Chinese Communist Party and is a representative of the 20th National Congress of the Chinese Communist Party.

== Biography ==
Zheng was born in Minhou County, Fujian, in November 1964, and graduated from the People's Liberation Army National Defence University.

Zheng enlisted in the People's Liberation Army (PLA) in December 1976, at the age of only 12. He successively served in the 14th Army and then the 13th Group Army, where he was elevated to political commissar in 2013. On 20 May 2008, Wenchuan County was hit by the 2008 Sichuan earthquake, and he led his troops to participate in the rescue operation. He also led his troops to participate in the rescue operation during the 2011 Yunnan earthquake in Yingjiang County in March 2011 and the 2013 Lushan earthquake in Lushan County in April 2013, respectively.

In January 2017, he succeeded Hou Hehua as director of the Political Department of the Central Theater Command, serving in that position from 2017 to 2020. He also served as deputy political commissar of the Central Theater Command. In December 2020, he was appointed political commissar of the Northern Theater Command Ground Force, in addition to serving as deputy political commissar of the Northern Theater Command. In June 2023, he was promoted to political commissar of the Northern Theater Command, succeeding Liu Qingsong.

He was promoted to the rank of lieutenant general (zhongjiang) in June 2019 and general (shangjiang) in June 2023.

Military offices
Preceded by Diao Guoxin	Political Commissar of the 13th Group Army; 2013–2017	Succeeded by Position revoked
Preceded by Hou Hehua	Director of the Political Department of the Central Theater Command; 2017–2020	Succeeded by Chen Guoqiang
Preceded by Shi Xiao	Political Commissar of the Northern Theater Command Ground Force; 2020–2023	Succeeded by Zhang Xiao
Preceded by Liu Qingsong	Political Commissar of the Northern Theater Command; 2023–present	Incumbent
