= Mei Wen =

- 梅文

Political Commissar of the Eastern Theater Command Navy
- Incumbent
- Assumed office March 2022
- Commander: Wang Zhongcai
- Preceded by: Liu Qingsong

Personal details
- Born: 1965 (age 60–61) Huangmei County, Hubei, China
- Party: Chinese Communist Party
- Education: Dalian Naval Academy

Military service
- Allegiance: People's Republic of China
- Branch/service: People's Liberation Army Navy
- Years of service: 1985–present
- Rank: Vice Admiral
- Commands: Eastern Theater Command Navy

Mei Wen (Chinese: 梅文; pinyin: Méi Wén; born 1965) is a vice admiral in the People's Liberation Army of China who is the current deputy political commissar of the Eastern Theater Command and political commissar of the Eastern Theater Command Navy.

== Biography ==
Mei was born in Huangmei County, Hubei, in 1965. He enlisted in the People's Liberation Army (PLA) during university in 1985. After graduated from Dalian Naval Academy, he was assigned to the South Sea Fleet (now Southern Theater Command Navy).

He was appointed political commissar of the Chinese aircraft carrier Liaoning on 25 September 2012. In May 2016, he became political commissar of the PLA Navy Second Submarine Base and later served as political commissar of the Network System Department of the PLA Strategic Support Force. In March 2022, he was commissioned as deputy political commissar of the Eastern Theater Command and political commissar of the Eastern Theater Command Navy.

He was promoted to the rank of rear admiral (shaojiang) in July 2017 and vice admiral (zhongjiang) in June 2022.

Military offices
Preceded by Liu Qingsong	Political Commissar of the Eastern Theater Command Navy; 2022–present	Incumbent
