= Shaanxi Military District =

- 中国人民解放军陕西省军区
- Founded: November 30, 1949; 76 years ago
- Country: People's Republic of China
- Allegiance: Chinese Communist Party
- Type: Military district
- Role: Command and control
- Part of: People's Liberation Army
- Headquarters: Xi'an, Shaanxi

Commanders
- Commander: Major general (shaojiang) Zhao Tianxiang
- Political Commisar: Major general (shaojiang) Tang Shuhai

Chinese name
- Simplified Chinese: 中国人民解放军陕西省军区
- Traditional Chinese: 中國人民解放軍陝西省軍區
Transcriptions
Standard Mandarin
- Hanyu Pinyin: Zhōngguó Rénmín Jiěfàngjūn Shǎnxīshěng Jūnqū

The Shaanxi Military District (Chinese: 中国人民解放军陕西省军区; full name People's Liberation Army Shaanxi Military District or PLA Shaanxi Military District) is a military district of the National Defense Mobilization Department of the Central Military Commission in China.

== History ==
Shaanxi Military District was established on 30 November 1949.

== Organization ==
The main functions of the Shaanxi Provincial Military District are to be fully responsible for the militia, reserve, military recruitment, military service, mobilization, and urban garrison tasks within the jurisdiction of Shaanxi Province. At the same time, the Military District is also the military affairs department of the Shaanxi Provincial Committee of the Chinese Communist Party, and the military service work agency of the Shaanxi Provincial People's Government. As such, it is under dual leadership: on the national military side from the Central Military Commission through the National Defense Mobilization Department, and on the provincial side, under the leadership of the Shaanxi Provincial Committee of the CCP and the Shaanxi Provincial Government.

The Secretary of the Shaanxi CCP Committee concurrently serves as the First Political Commissar of the Provincial Military District or as the First Secretary of the Military District Party Committee (depending on his military status), while the Governor of Shaanxi Province concurrently serves as the Director of the Shaanxi Provincial National Defense Mobilization Committee; and either the Commander or the Political Commissar of the Provincial Military District serves as a member of the Standing Committee of the Shaanxi CCP Committee, while both the Commander and the Political Commissar concurrently serve as Deputy Directors of the Shaanxi Provincial National Defense Mobilization Committee.

=== Agency Structure ===
Shaanxi Military District internal departments:

- Headquarters Department [司令部]
- Political Work Department [政治部]
- Logistics Department [后勤部]
- Equipment Department [装备部]

Shaanxi Military District subordinate units:

- Xi'an Garrison Area [西安警备区]
- Yulin Military Sub-district [榆林军分区]
- Yan'an Military Sub-district [延安军分区]
- Tongchuan Military Sub-district [铜川军分区]
- Weinan Military Sub-district [渭南军分区]
- Xianyang Military Sub-district [咸阳军分区]
- Baoji Military Sub-district [宝鸡军分区]
- Shangluo Military Sub-district [商洛军分区]
- Hanzhong Military Sub-district [汉中军分区]
- Ankang Military Sub-district [安康军分区]

== Leaders ==
=== Commanders ===
Name (English)	Name (Chinese)	Tenure begins	Tenure ends	Note
Yang Dezhi	杨得志	December 1949	December 1950	
Liu Jinxuan	刘金轩	December 1950	June 1952	
Yang Jiarui	杨嘉瑞	June 1952	September 1963	
Hu Bingyun	胡炳云	September 1963	March 1967	
Huang Jingyao	黄经耀	March 1967	May 1977	
Hu Bingyun	胡炳云	May 1977	May 1980	
Sun Hongdao	孙洪道	May 1980	May 1983	
Ji Tingbi	冀廷璧	May 1983	August 1985	
Wang Xibin	王希斌	August 1985	June 1990	
Wang Zhicheng	王志成	June 1990	December 1994	
Du Donghai	杜东海	December 1994	July 1999	
Qiu Yanhan	邱衍汉	July 1999	October 2000	
Ma Diankui	马殿魁	October 2000	October 2002	
Chen Shibao	陈时宝	October 2002	January 2008	
Cheng Bing	程兵	January 2008	October 2011	
Guo Jingzhou	郭景洲	October 2011	July 2013	
Gao Longfu	高龙福	July 2013	June 2017	
Yang Zhibin	杨志斌	June 2017	July 2021	
Zhao Tianxiang	赵天翔	July 2021		

=== Political commissars ===
Name (English)	Name (Chinese)	Tenure begins	Tenure ends	Note
Li Zhimin	李志民	December 1949	December 1950	
Ma Mingfang	马明方	January 1950	October 1952	
Pan Zili	潘自力	October 1952	October 1954	
Zhang Desheng	张德生	October 1954	March 1965	
Hu Yaobang	胡耀邦	March 1965	October 1965	
Huo Shilian	霍士廉	October 1965	May 1968	
Li Ruishan	李瑞山	June 1969	December 1978	
Ma Wenrui	马文瑞	March 1979	August 1984	
Bai Jinian	白纪年	August 1984	August 1987	
Zhao Huanzhi	赵焕职	August 1987	February 1992	
Zhao Lianchen	赵连臣	February 1992	April 1998	
Lei Xingping	雷星平	April 1998	July 2002	
Kong Ying	孔瑛	July 2002	July 2003	
Wang Zhenxi	王振西	December 2003	July 2006	
Xia Longxiang	夏龙祥	July 2006	December 2010	
Duan Jinhu	段进虎	December 2010	September 2012	
Lin Miaoxin	林淼鑫	September 2012	July 2014	
Wu Yude	武玉德	July 2014	May 2018	
Li Yang	李阳	May 2018		
Tang Shuhai	唐书海			
