= 91 =

91 or Ninety-one may refer to:

- 91 (number), the natural number following 90 and preceding 92
- the years 91 BC, AD 91, 1991, 2091
- Ninety One (group), a Kazakh boy group
- Ninety-One (solitaire)
- Ninety One Limited, an Anglo-South African asset management business
- Protactinium, atomic number 91
- 91 Aegina, a main-belt asteroid
- The international calling code for India

== Transportation ==
- List of highways numbered 91
- 91/Perris Valley Line, a commuter rail line
- Saab 91, an aircraft

== Other uses ==
- 91:an, a Swedish comic
- '91, a 2017 album by Jamie Grace

== See also ==
- 91st (disambiguation)
