= Xu Xianghua =

Chinese politician

- 徐向华

Commander of the 74th Group Army
- In office April 2017 – August 2018
- Preceded by: Office established
- Succeeded by: Hong Jiangqiang

Personal details
- Born: May 1965 (age 60) Hai'an County, Jiangsu, China
- Party: Chinese Communist Party

Military service
- Allegiance: People's Republic of China
- Branch/service: People's Liberation Army Ground Force
- Rank: Major general
- Commands: Deputy commander of Western Theater Command Ground Force

Xu Xianghua (simplified Chinese: 徐向华; traditional Chinese: 徐向華; pinyin: Xú Xiànghuá; born May 1965) is a major general in the People's Liberation Army (PLA) of China. In August 2019 he has been placed under investigation by the PLA's anti-corruption agency. Previously he served as deputy commander of Western Theater Command Ground Force.

== Early life ==
Xu was born in Hai'an County, Jiangsu, in May 1965.

== Career ==
He attained the rank of major general in December 2014. In April 2017 he was commissioned as army commander of the 74th Group Army. In October 2018, he was appointed deputy commander of Western Theater Command Ground Force.

He was a delegate to the 13th National People's Congress.

== Investigation ==
In August 2019, Xu was placed under investigation by the PLA's anti-corruption agency. Xu was ordered to resign as representative of the 13th National People's Congress.

Military offices
Preceded by Office established	Commander of the 74th Group Army; 2017-2018	Succeeded by Hong Jiangqiang (洪江强)
