= 91st Street station =

91st Street station may refer to:

- 91st Street station (IRT Broadway–Seventh Avenue Line)
- 91st Street station (Hudson–Bergen Light Rail)
- 91st Street/Beverly Hills station
- 91st Street/Chesterfield station
- 93rd Street/South Chicago station#History, replaced nearby 91st Street/South Chicago station
