= 91st Regiment of Foot (disambiguation) =

Four regiments of the British Army have been numbered the 91st Regiment of Foot:

- 91st Regiment of Foot (1759), raised in 1759
- 91st Regiment of Foot (Shropshire Volunteers), raised in 1779
- 91st Regiment of Foot, raised in 1793
- 91st (Argyllshire Highlanders) Regiment of Foot, raised in 1794 as the 98th and renumbered in 1796 as the 91st
