= Nanling County =

Coordinates: 30°55′04″N 118°19′39″E

Nanling 南陵县
- County
- Interactive map of Nanling
- Country: China
- Province: Anhui
- Prefecture-level city: Wuhu
- County seat: Jishan

Area
  - Total: 1,263.7 km^{2} (487.9 sq mi)

Population (2020)
  - Total: 539,929
  - Density: 427.26/km^{2} (1,106.6/sq mi)
- Time zone: UTC+8 (China Standard)
- Postal code: 241300

Nanling County (Chinese: 南陵县; pinyin: Nánlíng Xiàn) is a county in the southeast of Anhui Province, China. It is under the administration of Wuhu City.

== Administrative divisions ==
Nanling County is divided to 8 towns.

- Jishan (籍山镇)
- Yijiang (弋江镇)
- Xuzhen (许镇镇)
- Sanli (三里镇)
- Hewan (何湾镇)
- Gongshan (工山镇)
- Yandun (烟墩镇)
- Jiafa (家发镇)

== Climate ==
Climate data for Nanling, elevation 39 m (128 ft), (1991–2020 normals, extremes 1981–present)
Month	Jan	Feb	Mar	Apr	May	Jun	Jul	Aug	Sep	Oct	Nov	Dec	Year
Record high °C (°F)	22.3 (72.1)	29.4 (84.9)	34.8 (94.6)	34.3 (93.7)	36.4 (97.5)	37.7 (99.9)	40.3 (104.5)	39.2 (102.6)	37.5 (99.5)	34.3 (93.7)	30.2 (86.4)	23.8 (74.8)	40.3 (104.5)
Mean daily maximum °C (°F)	7.8 (46.0)	10.7 (51.3)	15.7 (60.3)	22.1 (71.8)	26.9 (80.4)	29.2 (84.6)	33.0 (91.4)	32.3 (90.1)	27.9 (82.2)	22.9 (73.2)	17.0 (62.6)	10.5 (50.9)	21.3 (70.4)
Daily mean °C (°F)	3.3 (37.9)	5.7 (42.3)	10.3 (50.5)	16.5 (61.7)	21.6 (70.9)	24.8 (76.6)	28.3 (82.9)	27.7 (81.9)	23.2 (73.8)	17.3 (63.1)	11.1 (52.0)	5.2 (41.4)	16.2 (61.2)
Mean daily minimum °C (°F)	0.1 (32.2)	2.2 (36.0)	6.3 (43.3)	12.0 (53.6)	17.4 (63.3)	21.4 (70.5)	24.7 (76.5)	24.5 (76.1)	19.8 (67.6)	13.3 (55.9)	7.1 (44.8)	1.6 (34.9)	12.5 (54.6)
Record low °C (°F)	−10.3 (13.5)	−10.8 (12.6)	−3.5 (25.7)	0.3 (32.5)	8.7 (47.7)	13.5 (56.3)	18.9 (66.0)	17.3 (63.1)	10.3 (50.5)	2.7 (36.9)	−4.3 (24.3)	−14.0 (6.8)	−14.0 (6.8)
Average precipitation mm (inches)	77.6 (3.06)	78.7 (3.10)	117.8 (4.64)	121.7 (4.79)	136.1 (5.36)	241.6 (9.51)	209.9 (8.26)	153.9 (6.06)	92.9 (3.66)	65.4 (2.57)	67.2 (2.65)	49.6 (1.95)	1,412.4 (55.61)
Average precipitation days (≥ 0.1 mm)	11.8	11.5	14.2	12.5	12.7	14.1	12.9	13.3	9.4	8.7	9.8	9.1	140
Average snowy days	3.9	2.2	0.7	0	0	0	0	0	0	0	0.3	1.3	8.4
Average relative humidity (%)	82	81	79	78	78	84	82	83	85	83	83	81	82
Mean monthly sunshine hours	96.5	102.8	123.2	148.4	163.0	137.0	194.3	179.9	143.8	144.7	126.1	116.6	1,676.3
Percentage possible sunshine	30	33	33	38	38	32	45	44	39	41	40	37	38
Source: China Meteorological Administration
