= Liu Zhenli =

Liu Zhenli may refer to:

- Liu Zhenli (footballer), a Chinese football goalkeeper
- Liu Zhenli (general), a general (Shangjiang) of the People's Liberation Army (PLA)
