= 91st Motorized Infantry Division =

91st Division (1949–53) 91st Infantry Division (1953–60) 91st Army Division (1960-85) 91st Motorized Infantry Division (1985-2017) 91st Combined Arms Brigade (2017-)
- Active: 1949.2 -
- Country: People's Republic of China
- Branch: People's Liberation Army Ground Force
- Type: Amphibious
- Size: Brigade
- Part of: 73rd Group Army
- Garrison/HQ: Zhangzhou, Fujian
- Engagements: Chinese Civil War

The 91st Division (Chinese: 第91师) was created in February 1949 under the Regulation of the Redesignations of All Organizations and Units of the Army, issued by Central Military Commission on November 1, 1948,. basing on the 37th Division, 13th Column of the Huadong Field Army. Its history can be traced to the New 5th Division, Jiaodong Military District, formed in February 1947.

The division was part of the 31st Corps. Under the flag of the 91st Division, it was engaged in several major battles in the Chinese Civil War, including the Jinan Campaign, Huaihai Campaign and Shanghai Campaign. During the Battle of Jinan, its 271st Regiment was the second regiment breached into the city of Jinan, which later received the honorific title of the Second Regiment of Jinan(Chinese: 济南第二团)

In July 1950, Artillery Regiment, 91st Division was activated, which was later renamed as 371st Artillery Regiment in 1953.

In April 1960 the division was renamed as the 91st Army Division (Chinese: 陆军第91师). It was then composed of:

- 271st Regiment
- 272nd Regiment
- 273rd Regiment
- 371st Artillery Regiment

In June 1969, 371st Artillery Regiment was renamed as Artillery Regiment, 91st Army Division.

In 1985, the division was renamed as the 91st Motorized Infantry Division(Chinese: 摩托化步兵第91师) and reconstituted as a southern motorized infantry division. Anti-Aircraft Artillery Regiment was activated.

The division was then composed of:

- 271st Infantry Regiment
- 272nd Infantry Regiment
- 273rd Infantry Regiment
- Artillery Regiment
- Anti-Aircraft Artillery Regiment

In September 1998, 271st Infantry Regiment was merged with the Tank Regiment, 80th Infantry Division to form the Armored Regiment, 91st Infantry Division.

From October 2000 the division's codename was Military Unit 73131.

The division was then composed of:

- 272nd Infantry Regiment - Military Unit 73132
- 273rd Infantry Regiment - Military Unit 73133
- Armored Regiment - Military Unit 73137, Second Regiment of Jinan
- Artillery Regiment - Military Unit 73135
- Anti-Aircraft Artillery Regiment - Military Unit 73136

In April 2017 the division was reconstituted: the bulk of the division was reorganized as 91st Amphibious Combined Arms Brigade(Chinese: 两栖合成第91旅), while the 272nd Regiment was reconstituted into the 92nd Light Combined Arms Brigade.

Both the 91st and the 92nd Combined Arms Brigades are now maneuvering parts of the PLA 73rd Group Army.
