= Liu Qingsong =

Chinese general

- 刘青松

Political Commissar of the Eastern Theater Command
- In office June 2023 – October 2026
- Preceded by: He Ping

Political Commissar of the Northern Theater Command
- In office January 2022 – June 2023
- Preceded by: Fan Xiaojun
- Succeeded by: Zheng Xuan

Deputy Political Commissar of the Eastern Theater Command
- In office July 2018 – January 2022
- Political Commissar: He Ping
- Preceded by: Mei Wen

Political Commissar of the Eastern Theater Command Navy
- In office July 2018 – January 2022
- Preceded by: Wang Huayong
- Succeeded by: Mei Wen

Personal details
- Born: November 1963 (age 62–63) Zhangqiu County, Shandong, China
- Party: Chinese Communist Party (expelled in 2026)

Military service
- Allegiance: People's Republic of China
- Branch/service: People's Liberation Army Air Force (?–2018); People's Liberation Army Navy (2018–present)
- Years of service: 1989–present
- Rank: Admiral

Chinese name
- Simplified Chinese: 刘青松
- Traditional Chinese: 劉青松
Transcriptions
Standard Mandarin
- Hanyu Pinyin: Liú Qīngsōng

Liu Qingsong (Chinese: 刘青松; born November 1963) is an admiral (shangjiang) of the People's Liberation Army (PLA), who served as the political commissar of the Eastern Theater Command. He previously served as political commissar of the Northern Theater Command from 2022 to 2023 and as political commissar of the Eastern Theater Command Navy and deputy political commissar of the Eastern Theater Command from 2018 to 2022. Liu was expelled from the Chinese Communist Party in 2026.

== Biography ==
Liu was born in Zhangqiu County (now Zhangqiu District of Jinan), Shandong, in November 1963. He served as the deputy director of the Guangzhou Military Region Air Force Command's (today's Southern Theater Command Air Force) Political Department before being appointed director of the Political Department of the Northern Theater Command Air Force. One year later, he was commissioned as deputy director of the Political Department of the People's Liberation Army Air Force. In July 2018, he rose to become political commissar of the Eastern Theater Command Navy and deputy political commissar of the Eastern Theater Command. In January 2022, he was appointed political commissar of the Northern Theater Command.

He was promoted to the rank of major general (shaojiang) in July 2014, vice admiral (zhongjiang) in June 2019, and admiral (shangjiang) in January 2022.

On 28 January 2022, as political commissar of the Northern Theater Command, Liu Qingsong became Chinese Communist Party Committee Secretary of Liaoning Zhang Guoqing, Governor of Liaoning Li Lecheng, and Chairman of the Liaoning Political Consultative Conference Zhou Bo in a ceremony to welcome the Chinese New Year and thank the civilian government of Liaoning for its support to the PLA. In the discussion, Liu noted that 2021 was a milestone year in the Party's history, that "we should unite more closely around the CPC Central Committee with Comrade Xi Jinping at the core," and praised the revitalization and modernization of Liaoning Province.

According to images of Liu's ribbon rack in 2022, Liu joined the military in 1989 (at 26 years of age) and has served 33 years in the PLA.

On 29 October 2026, the fifth plenary session of the 20th CCP Central Committee reviewed and approved the report of the Discipline Inspection Commission of the Central Military Commission on the "serious violations of discipline and law" by Liu and confirmed the Politburo decision to expel him from the CCP.

Military offices
Preceded by Wang Huayong (王华勇)	Political Commissar of the Eastern Theater Command Navy; 2018–2022	Succeeded by Mei Wen
Preceded by Fan Xiaojun	Political Commissar of the Northern Theater Command; 2022–2023	Succeeded by Zheng Xuan
Preceded by He Ping	Political Commissar of the Eastern Theater Command; 2023–2026	Incumbent
