= 91st Division =

In military terms, 91st Division or 91st Infantry Division may refer to:

== Infantry divisions ==
- 91st Motorized Infantry Division, People's Republic of China
- 91st Infantry Division (German Empire)
- 91st Infantry Division (Wehrmacht), Germany
- 91st Division (Israel)
- 91st Division (Imperial Japanese Army)
- 91st Division (Philippines)
- 91st Guards Rifle Division, Soviet Union
- 91st Motor Rifle Division, Soviet Union
- 91st Rifle Division, Soviet Union
- 91st Division (United States)

== Aviation divisions ==
- 91st Air Division, United States

== See also ==
- 91st Division Monument
- List of military divisions by number
- 91st Brigade (disambiguation)
- 91st Regiment (disambiguation)
