= Shuimen Air Base =

Military air base in China

Coordinates: 26°56′31″N 120°4′39″E

Shuimen Air Base (Simplified Chinese: 水门空军基地) is an air base under construction in China. The air base is built on a hilltop along the coast in Shuimen Township, Fujian Province and construction is nearly completed. First satellite images of the airbase occurred in 2009, with intelligence sources saying China had cleared a swathe of more than 2 km at an altitude of 364m to make way for the airbase.

As of 2012, satellite imagery of the area showed J-10 multirole combat aircraft from the People's Liberation Army Air Force (PLAAF) deployed at the base, with Russian-made Sukhoi Su-30 fighters and unmanned aerial vehicles (UAV) being gradually introduced.

S-300 long-range surface-to-air missile (SAM) batteries have also been spotted at the base. These may be part of the two battalions, or eight batteries, of more advanced S-300PMU1 systems ordered from Russia in 2001 that included 32 transporter erector launchers (TEL) and a total of 198 missiles. The missile batteries could also be HQ-9s, a Chinese derivative of the S-300. The base is located 246 km from Taipei and 380 km from the Senkaku Islands controlled by Japan but also claimed by China and Taiwan. The air base will help improve China's response in case of military conflicts with Taiwan and Japan on East China Sea.
