= 2nd Armored Brigade (People's Republic of China) =

Brigade of the People's Liberation Army

Tank Division(1949-50) 2nd Tank Division (1950-98) 2nd Armored Division (1998-2011) 2nd Armored Brigade (2011-17) 2nd Heavy Combined Arms Brigade (2017-)
- Country: People's Republic of China
- Type: Combined Arms, Armored
- Size: Brigade
- Part of: 71st Group Army
- Garrison/HQ: Xuzhou, Jiangsu
- Engagements: Korean War, Vietnam War, Sino-Vietnamese War

The 2nd Heavy Combined Arms Brigade, originally the 2nd Tank Division, the 2nd Armored Division and the 2nd Armored Brigade, is an armored formation of the People's Liberation Army Ground Force of the People's Republic of China.

== Formation ==
On October 8, 1949, the Tank Division, 3rd Field Army (Chinese: 三野战车师) was formed in Shanghai from the 1st Tank Regiment, Special Troops Column, PLA 3rd Field Army.

The division had three regiments; a tank regiment comprising three battalions, an amphibious tank regiment comprising three battalions; and an armored regiment comprising two battalions. In total, this division had 179 tanks, 95 armored vehicles, 162 automobiles and 3,135 personnel.

On January 8, 1950, the division was renamed the 2nd Tank Division (Chinese: 战车第2师). Initially, the 2nd Tank Division included the tank, amphibious tank, and armored regiments, renamed the 4th, 5th and 6th tank regiments, respectively. However, in August 1950, the 4th Tank Regiment was enlarged and renamed "2nd Tank Brigade" while the 5th and 6th tank regiments detached and formed the 3rd Tank Division.

On November 3, 1950, the division was renamed again to the 2nd Tank Division (Chinese: 坦克第2师). By then this division was composed of the:

- 3rd Tank Regiment (former 1st Battalion, 4th Tank Regiment);
- 4th Tank Regiment (former 3rd Battalion, 4th Tank Regiment);
- Motorized Infantry Regiment (former 268th Regiment from 90th Division);
- Motorized Artillery Regiment (former 306th Regiment from 102nd Division).

From 11 to 12 November 1950, the division received equipment from two self-propelled artillery regiments from the Soviet Army: 60 T-34s, 12 IS-2s, 8 SU-122s, 4 T-34 tank tractors and 24 artillery pieces. The equipment apparently came from unidentified "Ukrainskaya Guards" and "Moskovskaya Guards" tank regiments which were newly organized by 6th Guards Mechanized Army.

== In Korea ==
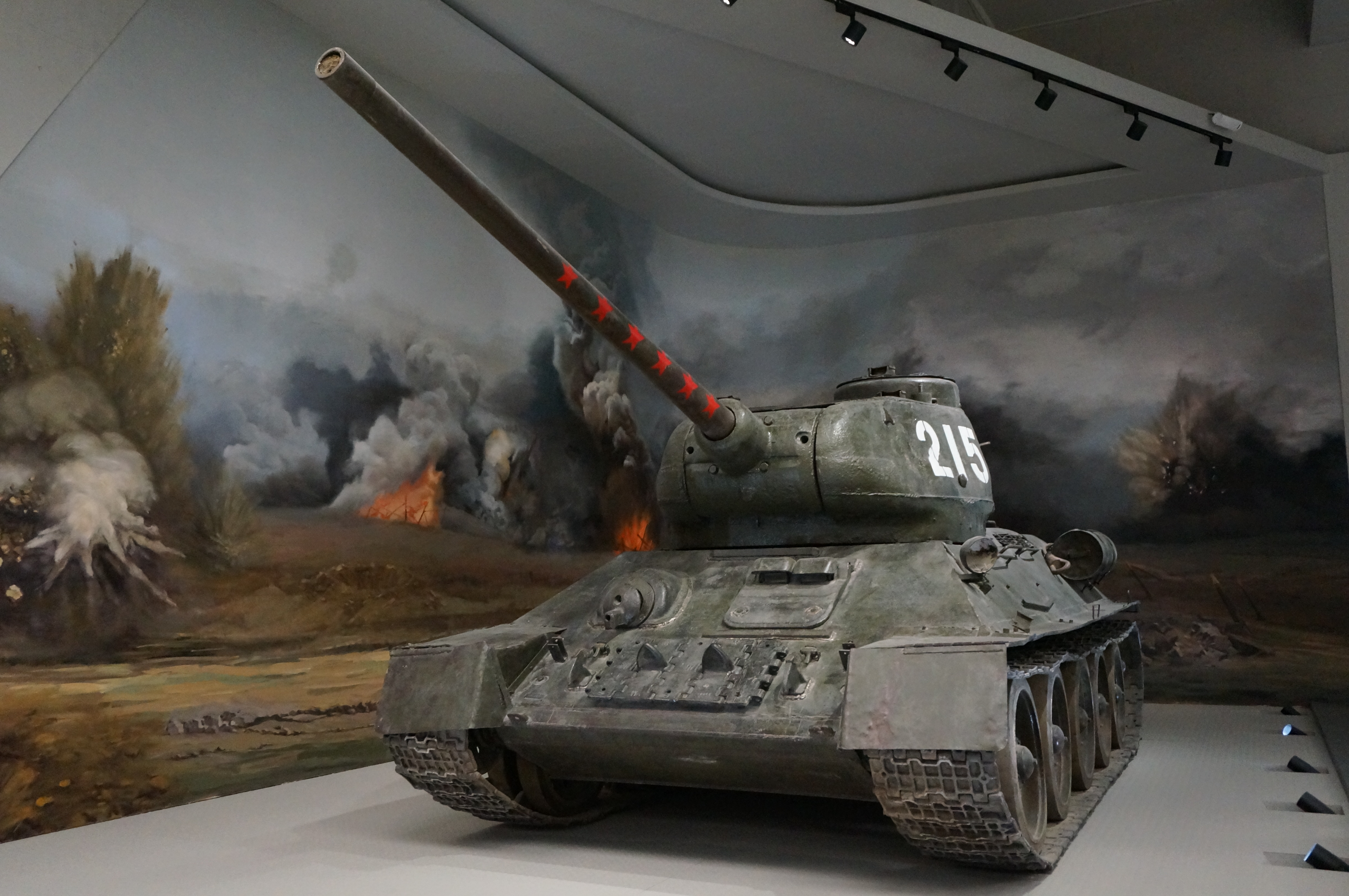
T-34 tank No.215

On May 30, 1951, the division moved to Korea to take part in the Korean War as a part of the People's Volunteer Army (PVA). During its deployment to Korea, the 2nd Division took part in 267 battles and engagements, destroying and damaging 28 enemy tanks, 24 artillery pieces, and 101 aircraft. The No. 215 T-34 from 4th Tank Regiment, 2nd Tank Division, allegedly destroyed four enemy tanks and damaged another M46 Patton tank during its fight from 6 to 8 July 1953. It also destroyed 26 bunkers, 9 artillery pieces, and a truck. That tank is now preserved in the Military Museum of the Chinese People's Revolution.

== After Korea ==
On July 8, 1951, the Motorized Infantry Regiment was reorganized into the 7th and 8th independent tank regiments.

In late 1954, the division returned from Korea and on June 1, 1955, and the Motorized Infantry Regiment was re-activated.

From February to March 1958, the division was reorganized as an "independent tank division": all heavy tank companies and self-propelled artillery batteries were detached, and three medium tank companies were attached. The Motorized Infantry Regiment was renamed the "Mechanized Regiment". The Motorized Artillery Regiment was renamed the "Artillery Regiment".

On April 5, 1959, the division absorbed the independent tank company of the Airborne Division.

From July 1963 to January 1964 its 3rd Tank Regiment received 56 Type 59 tanks, becoming the first Type 59 tank unit in PLA ground force. However the regiment was not filled to fully equipped (80 tanks) until October 1969.

From February to September 1964 4th Tank Regiment received fifty-six Type 59 tanks. The regiment was not filled to fully equipped until October 1969.

On September 18, 1967, the 331st Tank Self-Propelled Artillery Regiment from the 203rd Army Division were attached. As of August 10, 1969, all tank regiments were re-designated and the division was composed of the:

- 5th Tank Regiment (former 3rd Tank Regiment)
- 6th Tank Regiment (former 4th Tank Regiment)
- 7th Tank Regiment (former 331st Tank Self-Propelled Artillery Regiment)
- Mechanized Regiment
- Artillery Regiment

From February to June 1971, the 7th Tank Regiment was re-equipped with eighty Type 59 tanks.

On March 21, 1976, the Mechanized Regiment was renamed the "Armored Infantry Regiment".

The division remained as a "tank division, catalogue A" unit during the 1970s.

In 1979, a total of 110 officers and 1579 enlists took part in the Sino-Vietnamese conflicts 1979–90.

From January 1, 1983, the division was put under command of the 12th Army Corps. From August 1, 1985, the division is attached to the 12th Army.

In 1989 a detachment from the division took part in the enforced martial law and the crackdown on protests in Beijing.

By then the division was composed of the:

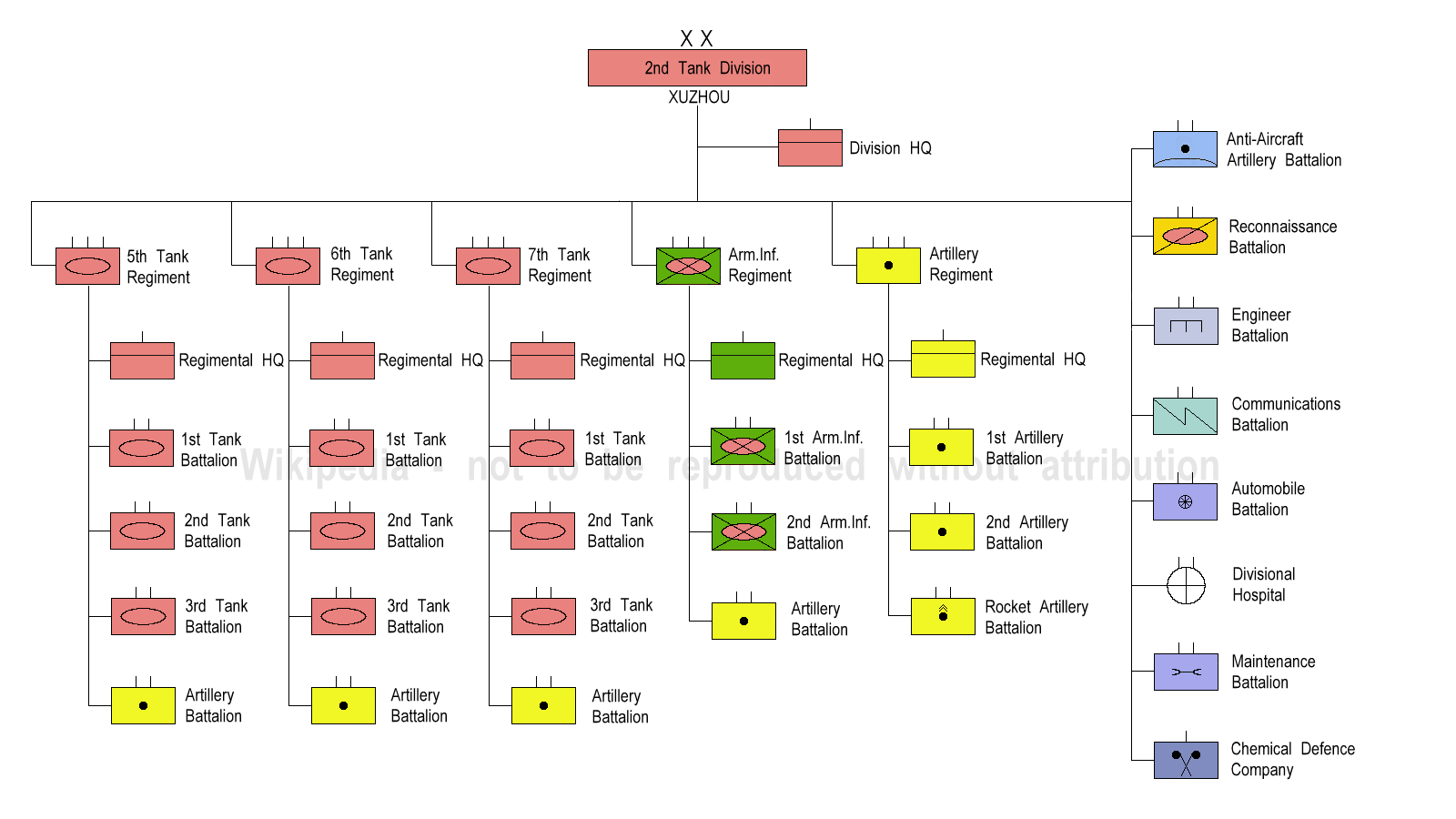
2nd Tank Division, order of battle from 1983 to 1998.

- 5th Tank Regiment;
- 6th Tank Regiment;
- 7th Tank Regiment;
- Armored Infantry Regiment;
- Artillery Regiment.

In October 1998, the division was renamed the "2nd Armored Division"(Chinese: 装甲第2师). The Armored Infantry Regiment was disbanded and absorbed into tank regiments which became armored regiments.

By then the division was composed of the:

- 5th Armored Regiment;
- 6th Armored Regiment;
- 7th Armored Regiment;
- Artillery Regiment.

== Division to brigade ==
In late 2011 the division was split into two: the division itself became the 2nd Armored Brigade (Chinese: 装甲第2旅), while half of its battalions formed the 35th Mechanized Infantry Brigade (Chinese: 机械化步兵第35旅).

In 2017, the brigade was renamed as the 2nd Heavy Combined Arms Brigade (Chinese: 重型合成第2旅).
