= 91st Brigade =

In military terms, 91st Brigade may refer to:

- 91st Mixed Brigade, Spain
- 91st Brigade (United Kingdom)
- 91st Brigade, Royal Field Artillery, a British Army unit during World War I
- 91st (4th London) Brigade, Royal Field Artillery, a British Army unit after World War I
- 91st Cyber Brigade, United States

== See also ==
- 91st Division (disambiguation)
- 91st Regiment (disambiguation)
