= Nanjing Military Region =

Former military region of China

- Nanjing Military Region (highlighted)
- Simplified Chinese: 南京军区
- Traditional Chinese: 南京軍區
Transcriptions
Standard Mandarin
- Hanyu Pinyin: Nánjīng Jūnqū

The Nanjing Military Region (Chinese: 南京军区) was one of the former seven military command regions for the Chinese People's Liberation Army. Its jurisdiction covered all military and armed police located in Anhui, Jiangsu, Zhejiang, Jiangxi, Fujian, and Shanghai. It also covered Taiwan, which is claimed by the People's Republic of China but administered by the Republic of China. The final head of the region was Cai Yingting. This region is now part of the Eastern Theater Command.

The 60th Corps was active in the Nanjing Military Region until disbanded in late 1985.

In 2005, the International Institute for Strategic Studies listed the formation with an estimated 250,000 personnel, three group armies (1st, 12th, and 31st Group Armies), two armoured, one mechanised infantry, three motorised infantry, and one artillery division. There were also one armoured, four motorised infantry, two artillery, three anti-aircraft brigades, plus an anti-tank regiment.

The headquarters for the East Sea Fleet were located within the region, at Ningbo.

== Tentative order of battle 2013 ==
Dennis J. Blasko's 'The Chinese Army Today: Tradition and Transformation for the 21st Century' listed formations within the Nanjing MR as:

- 1st Group Army (Huzhou, Zhejiang)
- 12th Group Army (Xuzhou, Jiangsu)
  - 34th Mechanized Infantry Brigade (Chuzhou (Sanjie)), Anhui
  - 36th Mechanized Infantry Brigade (Xinye, Jiangsu)
  - 179th Mechanized Infantry Brigade (Nanjiang, Jiangsu) ('Linfen Brigade')
  - 2nd Armored Division (Xuzhou, Jiangsu)
  - Artillery Brigade (Xuzhou, Jiangsu)
  - Air Defence Brigade (Huai'an, Jiangsu)
- 31st Group Army (Xiamen, Fujian)
  - 86th Motorized Infantry Division (Fuzhou, Fujian)
  - 91st Motorized Infantry Division (Zhangzhou, Fujian)
  - 92nd Motorized Infantry Brigade (Nan'an, Quanzhou, Fujian)
  - Amphibious Armoured Brigade (Zhangzhou, Fujian)
  - 3rd Artillery Brigade (Quanzhou, Fujian)
  - 13th Air Defence Brigade (Xiamen, Fujian)
  - 10th Army Aviation Regiment (Xiamen, Fujian)
  - Flying Dragon Special Operations Dadui (Zhangzhou, Fujian)
- Shanghai Garrison
  - Two coastal defence brigades
- Other Units subordinate to MD or MR
  - 31st Pontoon Bridge Brigade, Jiangsu MD

Among listed People's Liberation Army Air Force units in the region before the transition to the Eastern Theater Command were the 3rd Fighter Division, 10th Bomber Division, flying the H-6, the 14th Fighter Division, the 28th Attack Division, the 29th Fighter Division, and the 3rd Independent Regiment.

The 32nd Air Division at Rugao became the Military Region Air Force Training Base. In the early 1990s over 1000 surplus fighters were stored at Rugao.

The 4th Air Corps was established in Shanghai in August 1952, though Whitson indicates that Nieh F'eng-chih took command of the 4th Air Corps in late 1950s. The unit was later changed to the Shanghai Command Post. In the early 1950s, two divisions from the 29th Corps were transferred to the 4th Air Corps. In 1993, it became the Shanghai Base.

The 5th Air Corps moved to Hangzhou by 1954, but was abolished in April 1976. Its command staff were moved to Kunming and the Kunming MRAF CP retitled the 5th Air Corps.

== List of commanders ==
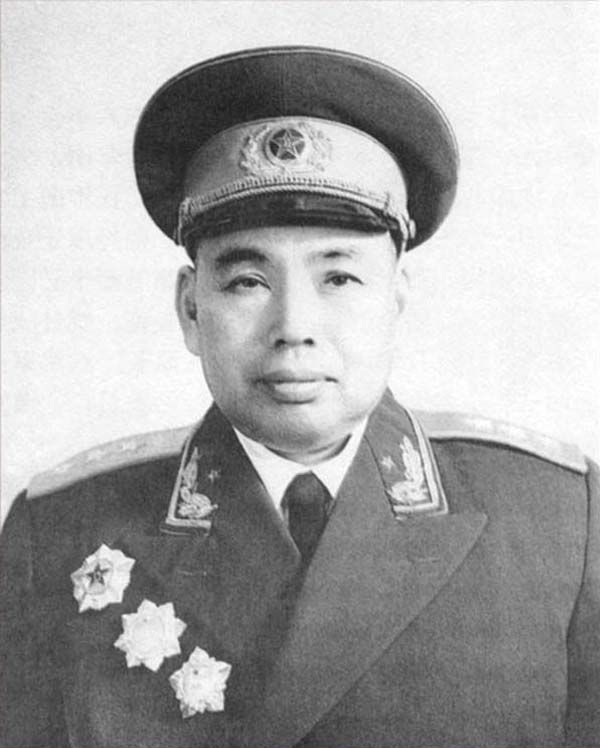
General Xu Shiyou

- Xu Shiyou
- Ding Sheng
- Nie Fengzhi
- Xiang Shouzhi
- Gu Hui
- Chen Bingde
- Liang Guanglie
- Zhu Wenquan
- Zhao Keshi, 2007−12
- Cai Yingting, 2012−16

== Nickname ==
Organizations affiliated with the Nanjing Military Region often used the nickname "frontline" (Chinese: 前线; pinyin: qiánxiàn; lit. 'front line'), including the Frontline Performance Troupe (Chinese: 前线文工团) and the People's Frontline (Chinese: 《人民前线》) newspaper.
