= 91st Regiment =

91st Regiment or 91st Infantry Regiment may refer to:

- 91st Regiment of Foot (disambiguation), several units of the British Army
- 91st Punjabis (Light Infantry), a unit of the British Indian Army
- 91st Cavalry Regiment, United States
- 91st Coast Artillery (United States)

Union Army (American Civil War):

- 91st Illinois Volunteer Infantry Regiment
- 91st Indiana Infantry Regiment
- 91st New York Volunteer Infantry Regiment
- 91st Ohio Infantry
- 91st Pennsylvania Infantry

== See also ==
- 91st Division (disambiguation)
