= Theater command =

Military command regions of China

The five theater commands of the PLA

A theater command (战区) is a joint military command of the People's Liberation Army of China, subordinated to the Central Military Commission. Theater commands are broadly responsible for strategy, plans, tactics, and policy specific to their assigned area of responsibility. In wartime, theater commands have full combatant command and control of all military units in their areas of responsibility; in peacetime, military units also report to their service branch headquarters. The service branches are responsible for construction and development of military units, but not for combatant command. There are 5 theater commands: Eastern, Southern, Western, Northern, and Central theater commands, organized by a geographical basis.

== Overview ==
In 2016, the seven military regions of China were reorganized into the present five theater commands and the term "military region" became obsolete. Chinese theater commands (TC) have been likened to the geographic combatant commands of the United States military; however, China's theater commands do not extend beyond the nation's borders. When listed by the government of the People's Republic of China, the theater commands are, by protocol, presented in order of precedence, as show below.

1. Eastern Theater Command, headquartered in Nanjing, is responsible for central eastern China and the East China Sea, and the Strait of Taiwan. The Eastern TC is responsible for matters related to Taiwan and likely Japan.
2. Southern Theater Command, headquartered in Guangzhou, is responsible for south-central China, the border with Vietnam, and the South China Sea. It is likely the Southern TC would play a significant role in assisting the Eastern TC with an amphibious operation against Taiwan.
3. Western Theater Command, headquartered in Chengdu, is responsible for the western half of China including the nation's borders with India and with Russia. During peacetime, units under the Western TC largely focus on countering separatist or terrorist threats, including the Xinjiang conflict and disputes in Tibet.
4. Northern Theater Command, headquartered in Shenyang, is responsible for northeastern China, namely the Mongolian, Russian, and Korean borders. Much of the Northern TC's focus is on managing China's shared border with North Korea. The Northern TC is responsible for matters related to Russia, Korea and Japan (shared with the Eastern TC).
5. Central Theater Command, headquartered in Beijing, is responsible for north-central China and the capital region. The Central TC serves as the national strategic military reserve and its primary mission is the defense of Beijing.

Each theater command is led by both a military commander who is responsible for operations and an equally-ranked political commissar who is responsible for ideological functions of the command in keeping with the values of the CCP. The staff of a theater command's headquarters participates in committee-based decision-making instead of a hierarchical command structure used by most other militaries. Under each theater command are the single-service headquarters for the Ground Force (PLAGF), Air Force (PLAAF), and Navy (PLAN) which adhere to a dual command structure wherein each subordinate service headquarters under a theater command reports to both the theater command it is assigned to and the service's national headquarters. In wartime it is believed these services will fall under the complete operational control of their theater command. Neither the Central nor the Western Theater Command have an assigned PLAN service headquarters due to their smaller coastal profiles.

Alongside each service headquarters, a theater command has organically assigned an electronic countermeasures brigade, an information operations support brigade, a reconnaissance and intelligence support brigade, and a Joint Logistics Service Center (JLSC) from the PLA's Joint Logistic Support Force (JSLF). Theater commands also own and operate most of the PLA's deep reconnaissance capabilities (forces intended to operate beyond a unit's firing range). Although control over intercontinental ballistic missiles (ICBMs) and long-range ballistic missiles of the PLA Rocket Force (PLARF) remains with the Chinese National Command Authority (NCA), theater commands maintain a contingent of PLARF personnel who aid in integrating long-range ballistic missiles into theater command planning. Short-range ballistic missile (SRBM) brigades may also be attached to theater commands.

== History ==
The People's Liberation Army was originally organized by military regions (Chinese: 军区; pinyin: jūnqū). By July 1950, there were the Northwest Military Region, North China Military Region, Northeastern Military Region, Southwest Military Region, East China Military Region, and Central South Military Region.

In December 1954, the existing six major military regions were reorganized into twelve regions: Shenyang (which traces history from the Northeastern Military Region), Beijing, Jinan, Nanjing, Guangzhou, Kunming, Wuhan, Chengdu, Lanzhou, Tibet, Xinjiang, and Inner Mongolia. The former Northwest Military Region, which became the Beijing Military Region, doubled as Beijing-Tianjin Garrison Command. Due to the tension in the Taiwan Straits, the State Council ordered the establishment of the Fuzhou Military Region on 22 April 1956. It included the provincial military districts of Fujian and Jiangsu, formerly under the Nanjing MR. The Fuzhou MR was officially established on 1 July 1956, with Ye Fei as its commander and political commissar.

The thirteen military regions established by 1956 were reduced to eleven in the late 1960s. In 1967, the Inner Mongolia and Tibet Military Regions were downgraded and incorporated into the Beijing and Chengdu Military Regions.

Those eleven military regions—Shenyang, Beijing, Jinan, Nanjing, Guangzhou (including Hainan Island), Kunming, Wuhan, Chengdu, Lanzhou, Xinjiang, and Fuzhou—were reduced to seven by 1985–88. From that point the active military districts included Lanzhou Military Region, incorporating the former Ürümqi Military Region, Chengdu Military Region, incorporating the former Kunming MR, Nanjing Military Region, which includes the former Fuzhou MR, Beijing Military Region, and Shenyang Military Region. Finally Guangzhou and Jinan Military Regions both appear to include parts of the former Wuhan MR.

The military regions are divided into military districts, usually contiguous with provinces, and military sub-districts.

In January 2014, Chinese senior military officers revealed that the PLA is planning to reduce the number of military regions from seven to five "military areas" to have joint command with ground, naval, air, and Second Artillery Corps forces. This change was planned to transition their concept of operations from primarily ground-oriented defense to mobile and coordinated movement of all services and to enhance offensive air and naval capabilities into the East China Sea. The coastal Jinan, Nanjing, and Guangzhou regions became three military areas, each with a joint operations command, for projecting power into the Yellow Sea, East China Sea, and South China Sea. The four other inland military regions were streamlined into two military areas mainly for organizing forces for operations.

In February 2016, the seven military regions were reorganized into five theater commands, as part of the 2015 People's Republic of China military reform.

== See also ==
- List of military regions of the National Revolutionary Army, historic former regions
- List of People's Liberation Army Air Force airbases
