= 71st Group Army =

Chinese military unit

- 第七十一集团军
- Active: 1949–present
- Country: China
- Allegiance: Chinese Communist Party
- Branch: People's Liberation Army Ground Force
- Type: Group army
- Part of: Eastern Theater Command Ground Force
- Garrison/HQ: Xuzhou, Jiangsu
- Engagements: Second Sino-Japanese War; World War II; Chinese Civil War; Korean War * Battle of Triangle Hill

Commanders
- Current commander: Major General Han Bing
- Political Commissar: Major General Huang Chaohui
- Notable commanders: Wang Jinshan; You Taizhong; Li Desheng; Li Zhen; Zeng Shaoshan; Ma Ning

Insignia
- NATO Map Symbol

The 71st Group Army (Chinese: 第七十一集团军; pinyin: Dì Qīshíyī Jítuánjūn) is a Chinese People's Liberation Army Ground Force group army subordinated to the Eastern Theater Command. It was called the 12th Group Army before 2017.

== History ==
The origin of the 12th Army lies in the surrender of the 74th Division of the Chinese Nationalist National Revolutionary Army, as well as with the sixth column of the Second Field Army. On 9 February 1949, the 34th, 35th and the 36th Divisions were incorporated into the Twelfth Army. On 29 November 1949, Chongqing was captured and later the Battle of Chengdu was fought.

In December 1950, the 12th Army entered the Korean War as the 12th Army of the Chinese People's Volunteer Army (中国人民志愿军第十二军), quickly finding itself involved in the Chinese Fifth Phase (Spring) Offensive. The 12th Army's most notable contribution to the war was the 1952 Operation Showdown, known in Chinese as the Shangganling Campaign. Despite constant barrages of artillery fire and bombings, the 12th Corps, temporarily placed under command of the PVA 15th Corps, held Sniper Ridge against Republic of Korea forces and those of the United States Army's 7th Infantry Division. Although incurring catastrophic casualties, the Chinese claimed victory in the battle and would go on to produce several major motion picture films such as Battle on Shangganling Mountain depicting the saga.

In April 1954, the 12th Army departed North Korea and returned to garrison in China in Hefei City, Anhui Province and Xuzhou City, Jiangsu Province. During the military downsizing by Deng Xiaoping, the 12th Army was reorganized into the 12th Group Army of the People's Liberation Army and given the Military Unit Cover Designator (MUCD) Unit 83226. The MUCD was changed again to Unit 73061 under the Nanjing Military Region. On 1 August 1983, the 2nd Tank Division was attached to the 12th Army Corps. Later, in May 1989, the 12th Army's 34th, 36th and 110th Divisions, Artillery Brigade, and Anti-Aircraft Battalion were deployed to Beijing to enforce martial law and suppress the Tiananmen Square protests of 1989.

In 2016, the military regions were abolished and replaced by theater commands; 12th Group Army was subordinated to the new Eastern Theater Command. In April 2017, the number of group armies was reduced and the 12th Group Army was redesignated as the 71st Group Army.

== Organization ==
The 71st Group Army was first commanded by Major General Wang Yinfang from March 2017 to January 2018 until he was succeeded by Major General Li Zhonglin in January 2018. The group army's political commissar was Major General Xu Deqing from March 2017 to May 2018 when Yin Hongxing succeeded him. As of 2022, Xu serves as the Central Theater Command's political commissar.

The 71st Group Army appears to comprise six combined-arms maneuver brigades, four of which are heavy (armored), one medium (mechanized), and one light (motorized) and each of which lead four combined-arms battalions. These combined arms brigades are the PLAGF's basic operational unit, likely following the United States' and later Russia's transition from division-centric warfare to brigade-centric warfare. The 71st Group Army also commands six combat support brigades.

Since 2017, the 71st Group Army commands the following subordinate units.

- 2nd Heavy Combined-Arms Brigade
- 35th Heavy Combined-Arms Brigade
- 160th Heavy Combined-Arms Brigade
- 178th Medium Combined-Arms Brigade
- 179th Light Combined-Arms Brigade
- 235th Heavy Combined-Arms Brigade
- 71st Artillery Brigade
- 71st Army Aviation Brigade (Chinese: 陆航第71旅) - Operates Z-8, Z-9, Z-19, Z-20 helicopters
- 71st Air Defense Brigade
- 71st Special Operations Brigade
- 71st Engineering and Chemical Defense Brigade
- 71st Service Support Brigade
