= 301st Coastal Defence Brigade =

98th Division (1949-50) 15th Public Security Division (1950-55) Yangtze Estuary Fort District (1955-56) 15th Garrison Division (1956-70) 1st Garrison Division of Nanjing Military Region (1970-85) 1st Garrison Brigade of Nanjing Military Region (1985-93) 1st Coastal Defence Brigade (1993-2017) 301st Coastal Defence Brigade (2017-)
- Active: 1949.2 -
- Country: (China)
- Type: Infantry, Garrison, Coastal Defence
- Size: Brigade
- Part of: Shanghai Security District
- Garrison/HQ: Pudong, Shanghai
- Engagements: Chinese Civil War, Korean War

The 98th Division (Chinese: 第98师) was formed in February 1949 from 1st Regiment of 7th Division, 17th Regiment of 11th Division of PLA Bohai column of Huadong Field Army and elements from defected Republic of China Army 112th, 113th and 114th Regiment of 38th Division.

== History ==
=== Initial composition ===
Under the command of 33rd Corps (People's Liberation Army) it took part in the Chinese Civil War. The division was then composed of:

- 292nd Regiment;
- 293rd Regiment;
- 294th Regiment.

=== Evolution and various names ===
After the Shanghai Campaign the division stationed in Baoshan, Shanghai. In November 1950 the division was re-organized and renamed as 15th Public Security Division(Chinese: 公安第15师) while detaching from the Corps. By then the division was composed of:

- 43rd Public Security Regiment (former 292nd Infantry);
- 44th Public Security Regiment (former 293rd Infantry);
- 45th Public Security Regiment (former 294th Infantry).

In May 1952, the division absorbed the 17th Garrison Division. 49th Public Security Regiment, 17th Public Security Division became the new 43rd Public Security Regiment. From December 1952 to September 1953 the regiment was deployed in the Korean War under the command of 1st Public Security Division.

In July 1955, Headquarters, 15th Garrison Division, along with its 45th Public Security Regiment and 4th Interior Guards Regiment of Shanghai Security District, was reorganized into Yangtze Estuary Fort District(Chinese: 长江口要塞区). On December 10, 1956, the fort district was inactivated, 15th Garrison Division was then reactivated in Pudong, Shanghai. The division was then a part of Shanghai Security District.

In late 1969 to early 1970, the division was renamed as 1st Garrison Division of Nanjing Military Region(Chinese: 南京军区守备第1师).

In 1985 the division was reduced as 1st Garrison Brigade of Nanjing Military Region(Chinese: 南京军区守备第1旅).

In January 1993 the brigade was renamed as 1st Coastal Defence Brigade(Chinese: 海防第1旅).

In April 2017 the brigade was renamed as 301st Coastal Defence Brigade(Chinese: 海防第301旅).
