= People's Liberation Army Navy Marine Corps =

Marine force of the People's Republic of China

- 中国人民解放军海军陆战队; Zhōngguó Rénmín Jiěfàngjūn Hǎijūnlùzhànduì
- Patch of the People's Liberation Army Marine Corps
- Founded: April 1953 (73 years ago)
- Country: China
- Branch: People's Liberation Army Navy
- Type: Naval infantry
- Role: Amphibious warfare VBSS; Rapid reaction force
- Size: 100,000
- Part of: People's Liberation Army
- Garrison/HQ: Chaozhou, Guangdong
- Mottos: 陆地猛虎，海上蛟龙 ("Fierce Tiger of the land, Jiaolong of the sea")
- Colors: White; Blue
- Engagements: Chinese Civil War; Dongshan Island Campaign; Battle of Yijiangshan Islands; Battle of the Paracel Islands; Johnson South Reef Skirmish; Anti-Piracy Operations in Gulf of Aden; Evacuation of Chinese and foreign nationals from Yemen

Commanders
- Commander: Rear Admiral Zhu Chuansheng
- Political Commissar: Rear Admiral Wang Hongbin

Aircraft flown
- Attack helicopter: Harbin Z-9WA
- Cargo helicopter: Changhe Z-8; Changhe Z-18
- Utility helicopter: Harbin Z-9C

The People's Liberation Army Navy Marine Corps (PLANMC) is the maritime land force of the People's Liberation Army (PLA) and one of five major branches of the People's Liberation Army Navy (PLAN), responsible for amphibious warfare, expeditionary operations and rapid responses. In 2026, the corps had an estimated 100,000 personnel.

== History ==
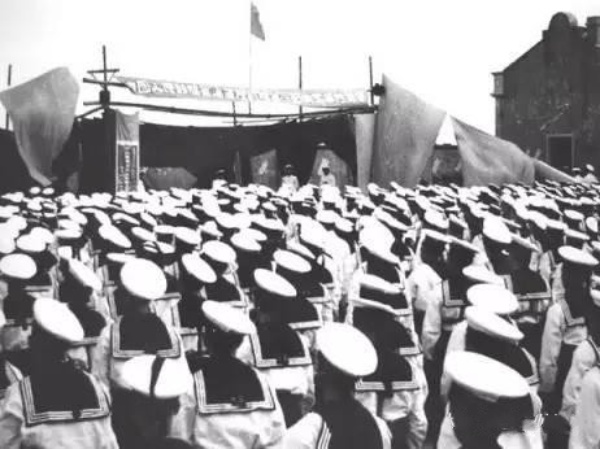
The founding of the PLANMC in 1953.

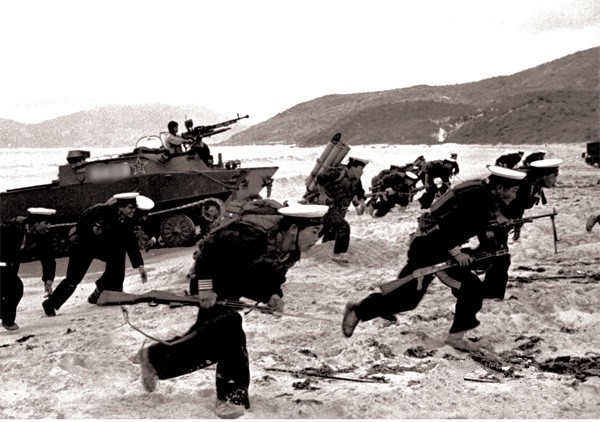
An amphibious landing exercise by marines in 1962.

The present PLANMC was originally established in April 1953 to conduct amphibious operations against islands held by the Republic of China (Taiwan). By the end of the Korean War, the PLANMC numbered 110,000 personnel organized in eight divisions. However, the organization was disbanded in October 1957 when the leadership of China abandoned any plans to seize the island of Taiwan. In 1979 the Central Military Commission (CMC) re-established the Marine Corps and organized it under the PLAN.

Prior to 2017 when reforms to the corps began, the PLANMC consisted of two brigades with around 12,000 personnel.

The PLANMC participated in multiple international exercises, including participation in RIMPAC, and engaged with United States Marine Corps in mutual training and friendly cultural exchanges during the Bush and Obama administrations as part of its "tranquility and good order" policy according to its navy chief. However, with the Trump administration the PLAN and PLANMC were dis-invited from the 2018 Rim of the Pacific and the US Marines are trained to fight against the PLANMC.

== Organization ==
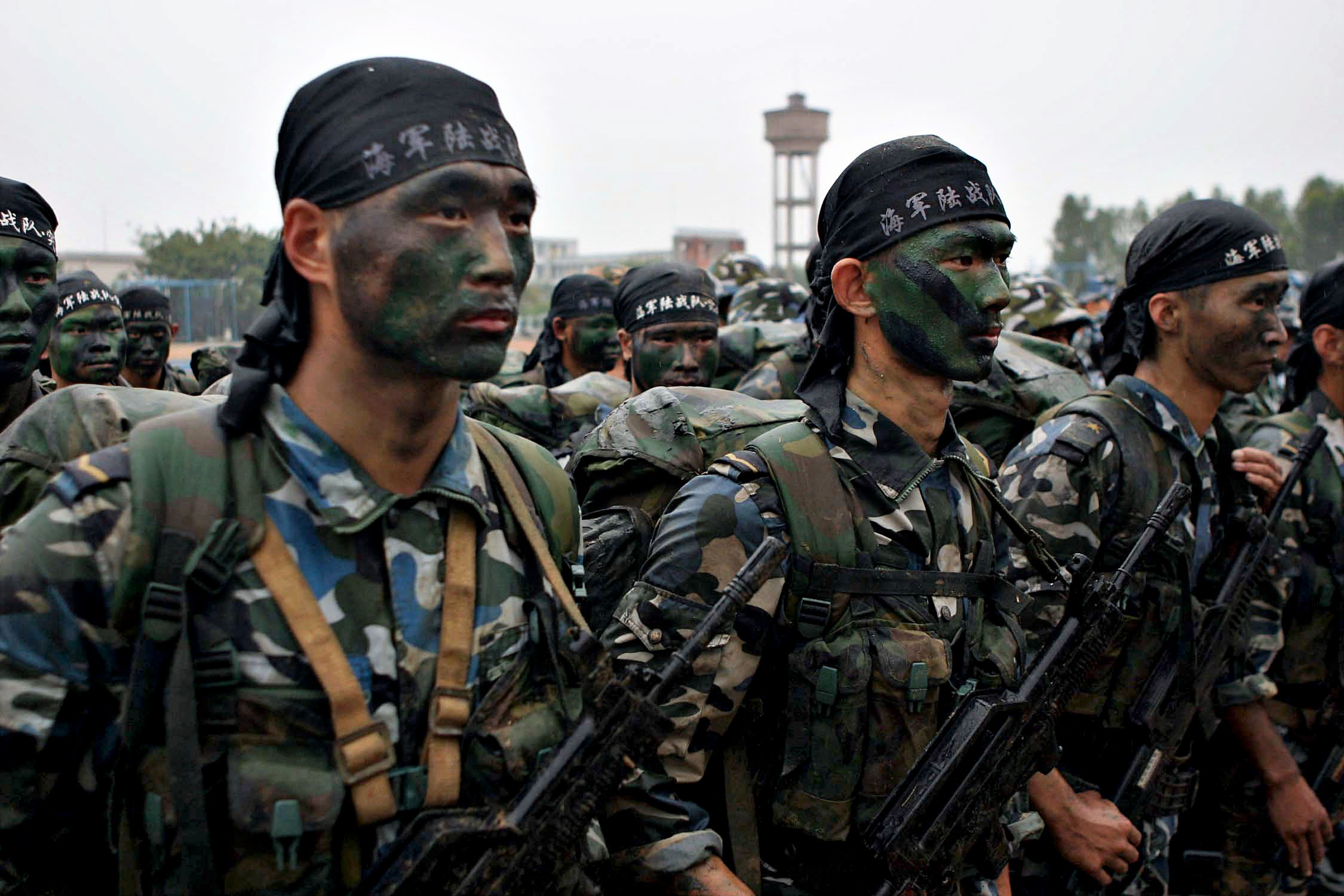
PLA marines based in Zhanjiang stand at attention during a visit by a U.S. admiral in 2006.

PLANMC currently has 8 brigades: 6 maneuver brigades, 1 aviation brigade and 1 commando brigade.

- 1st Marine Brigade and 2nd Marine Brigade, both based in Zhanjiang
- 3rd Marine Brigade based in Jinjiang
- 4th Marine Brigade based in Jieyang
- 5th Marine Brigade based in Qingdao
- 6th Marine Brigade Qingdao and Yantai
- Naval Shipborne Aviation Brigade based in Zhucheng
- Special Operations Brigade based in Sanya

Each Marine Brigade is organized into the following elements:

- Amphibious mechanized infantry 1st battalion
- Amphibious mechanized infantry 2nd battalion
- Light mechanized infantry 3rd battalion
- Air assault infantry battalion
- Reconnaissance battalion
- Artillery battalion
- Air defense battalion
- Operational support battalion
- Service support battalion

The PLA has additional amphibious assault capabilities in the PLAGF amphibious combined-arms brigades.

== Equipment ==
Personnel equipment

- FHJ-84

Armor

- ZTD-05
- ZBD-05
- ZTL-11
- ZBL-09
- CS/VP4 ATV
- ZTQ-15

Aircraft

- Z-8
- Z-9WA
- Z-9C

Artillery and ammunition

- PHL-81
- PLZ-07B
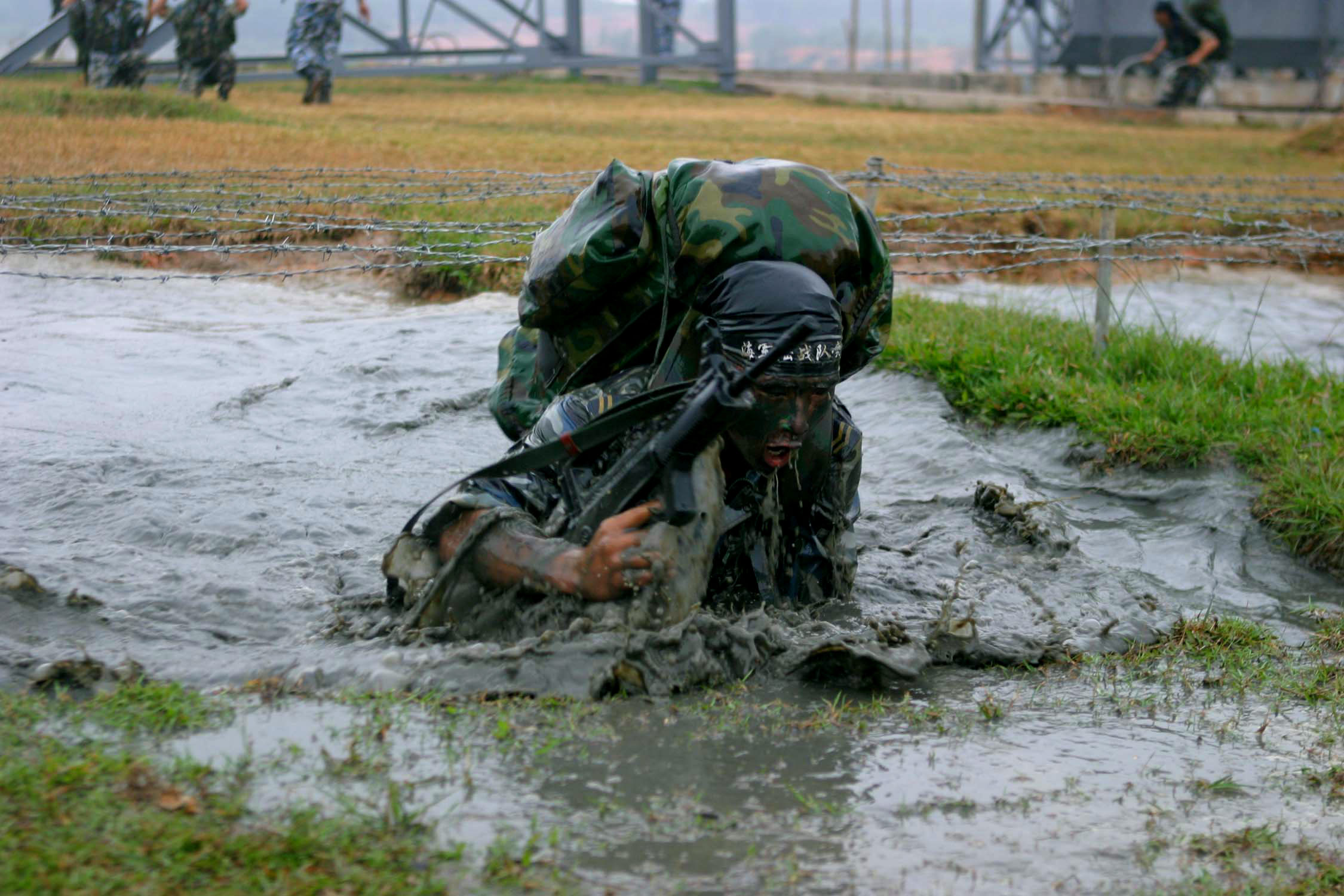
A PLAN marine fighting through a combat obstacle course at a naval base as part of marine capability demonstrations, 2006.

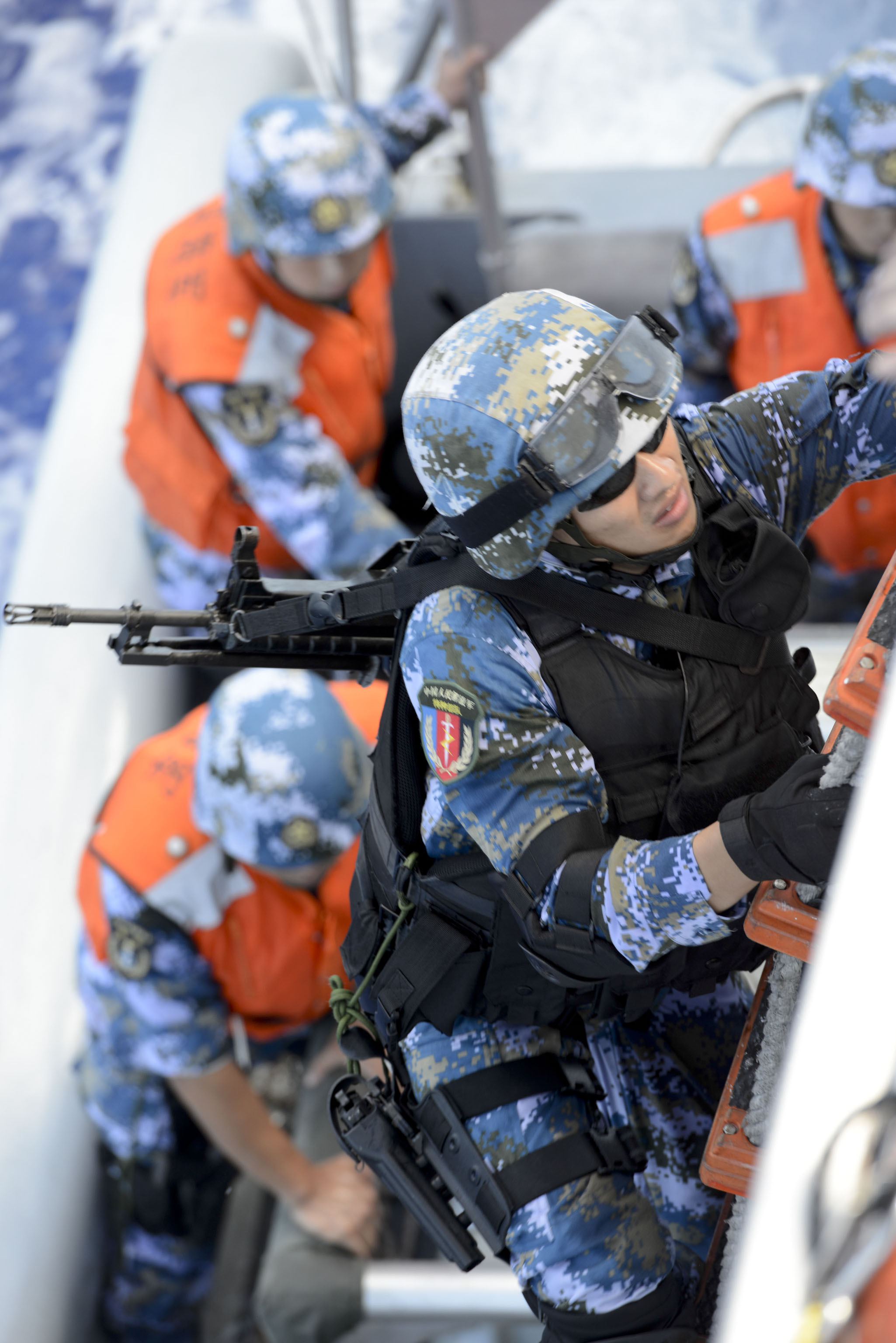
A PLAN marine with a boarding team assigned to the guided missile destroyer Haikou during a maritime operations exercise in RIMPAC 2014.

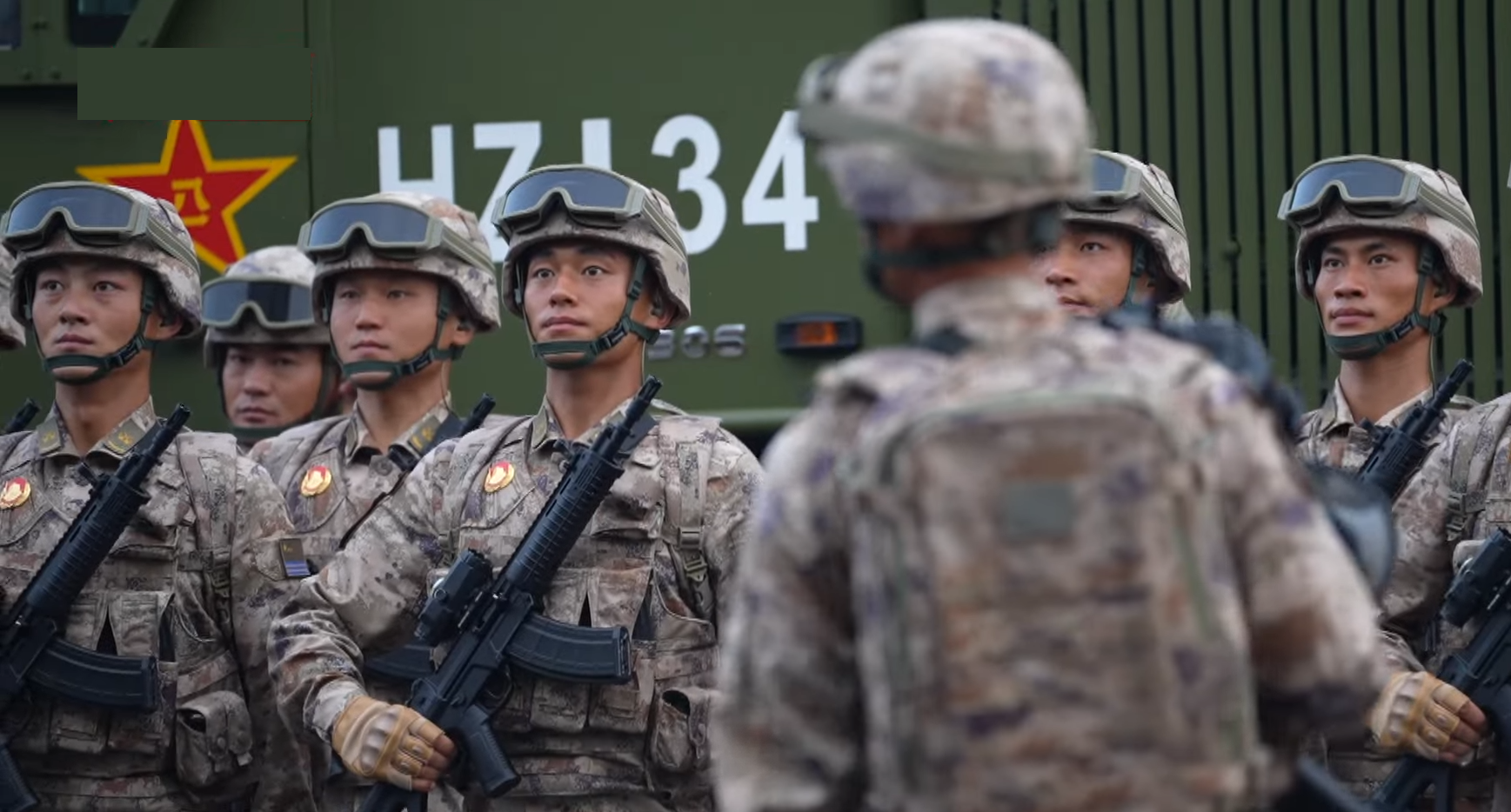
Chinese Marines in Type 21 uniforms at the 2025 China Victory Day Parade

== See also ==
- Republic of China Marine Corps (part of the Republic of China Navy)
- People's Liberation Army Airborne Corps (part of the People's Liberation Army Air Force)
- People's Liberation Army Navy Coastal Defense Force
- People's Liberation Army special operations forces
