= 72nd Group Army =

Chinese military unit

- 第七十二集团军
- Active: February 1, 1947–present
- Country: China
- Allegiance: Chinese Communist Party
- Branch: People's Liberation Army Ground Force
- Type: Group army
- Part of: Eastern Theater Command Ground Force
- Garrison/HQ: Huzhou, Zhejiang

The 72nd Group Army (Chinese: 第七十二集团军; pinyin: Dì Qīshí'èr Jítuánjūn) is a Chinese People's Liberation Army Ground Force (PLAGF) formation subordinated to the Eastern Theater Command.

Prior to April 2017, it was called 1st Group Army (Unit 83011 and 73011) with its headquarters in Huzhou, Zhejiang.

== History ==
The 1st Group Army was created by 1988 when the PLA's infantry corps were reorganized into group armies. The unit(s) forming the 1st Group Army were descended from the First Field Army of the late Chinese Civil War.

1st Group Army was subordinated to the Nanjing Military Region, which had strong political ties to paramount leader Deng Xiaoping. During the 1989 Tiananmen Square protests and massacre, the formation remained in place near Shanghai as a safeguard against unrest.

During the force reductions of the late-1990s, the group army's 2nd Division was transferred to the People's Armed Police as Unit 8690.

From the mid-2010s, the group army transferred to the Eastern Theater Command, which replaced the military region. In April 2017, the group army was designated as the 72nd Group Army.

== Organization ==
According to Dennis Blasko in 2006 the group army had the following subordinate units:

- 1st Amphibious Mechanized Infantry Division
- 3rd Motorized Infantry Brigade
- Armored division
- 9th Artillery Division
- Air defense brigade

Blasko listed an additional motorized infantry brigade in 2002.

According to the International Institute for Strategic Studies in 2024, the group army had the following subordinate units:

- 1 armored brigade
- 2 mechanized infantry brigades
- 1 infantry brigade
- 2 amphibious brigades
- 1 special operations brigade
- 1 artillery brigade
- 1 engineering brigade
- 1 NBC brigade
- 1 support brigade
- 1 helicopter brigade
- 1 air defense brigade

== Sources ==
- Blasko, Dennis J. (2006). The Chinese Army Today: Tradition and transformation for the 21st century. Asian Security Studies. New York: Routledge. ISBN 9-780-415-77003-3.
- Mulvenon, James C.; Yang, Andrew N. D., eds. (2002). The People's Liberation Army as Organization: Reference Volume v1.0. RAND Corporation. ISBN 0-8330-3303-4.
- Saunders, Phillip C.; Ding, Arthur S.; Scobell, Andrew; Yang, Andrew N.D.; Joel, Wuthnow, eds. (2019). Chairman Xi Remakes the PLA: Assessing Chinese Military Reforms. Washington, D.C.: National Defense University Press. ISBN 978-1070233420.
