= 73rd Group Army =

Chinese military unit

- 第七十三集团军
- Active: 1985–present
- Country: People's Republic of China
- Allegiance: Chinese Communist Party
- Branch: People's Liberation Army Ground Force
- Type: Group army
- Size: Field army
- Part of: Eastern Theater Command Ground Force
- Garrison/HQ: Jimei, Xiamen, Fujian
- Engagements: Chinese Civil War

Commanders
- Current commander: Major General Ding Laifu
- Political Commissar: Major General Fang Ming

Insignia
- NATO Map Symbol

The 73rd Group Army is a formation of China's People's Liberation Army Ground Force (PLAGF) subordinated to the Eastern Theater Command (ETC). The ETC's area of responsibility includes Taiwan, and the 73rd Group Army includes amphibious forces.

The 73rd Group Army was known as the 31st Group Army until April 2017. The group army was considered an elite unit.

== History ==
=== Chinese Civil War ===
The 31st Group Army traces its lineage to the Shantung Column of the Shantung Military Region which was formed around 1941. By 1945 the column had been reorganized and redesignated into several military districts, including the Chiao-Tung Military District. By 1946, elements of the Chiao-Tung MD were reorganized and redesignated 9th and 13th Columns. The 13th Column, commanded by Chou Chih-chien was composed of three divisions, including the 37th, 38th, and 39th. In the mid-to-late 1940s the 13th Column was reorganized and redesignated as the 31st Corps, also commanded by Chou Chih-chien. The 31st Corps was composed of the 91st, 92nd and 93rd Divisions.

By August 1949, 31st Corps was subordinated to the 10th Army of the Third Field Army. 29th and 31st Corps captured Zhangzhou in late-September. It participated in the capture of Xiamen and Gulangyu, and the Battle of Guningtou, in October.

The corps became the core of the 31st Group Army.

=== 21st century ===
In early October 1991 the 258th Regiment of the 86th Motorized Infantry Division, along with units from various military sub-districts, conducted defensive exercises and combined militia exercises in the Banding Area, Lianjiang Xian, Fujian Province. In mid October to early November 1991 the 92nd and 93rd Infantry Divisions (since disbanded) of the 31st Group Army conducted routine training and field training activities in the Fuzhou area of Changpu and Nanan. In early April 1992 the signal corps of the 31st Signal Regiment conducted routine training and an overall signal training and evaluation between veterans and replacements in Xiamen, Fujian Province.

== Composition ==
In 2024, the formation included the following components:

- 1 special operations brigade
- 1 armored brigade
- 1 mechanized infantry brigade
- 2 infantry brigade
- 2 amphibious brigades
- 1 artillery brigade
- 1 engineering/NBC brigade
- 1 support brigade
- 1 helicopter brigade
- 1 air defense brigade
