= Chengdu J-20 =

Chinese stealth fighter aircraft

J-20 Weilong (Mighty Dragon)
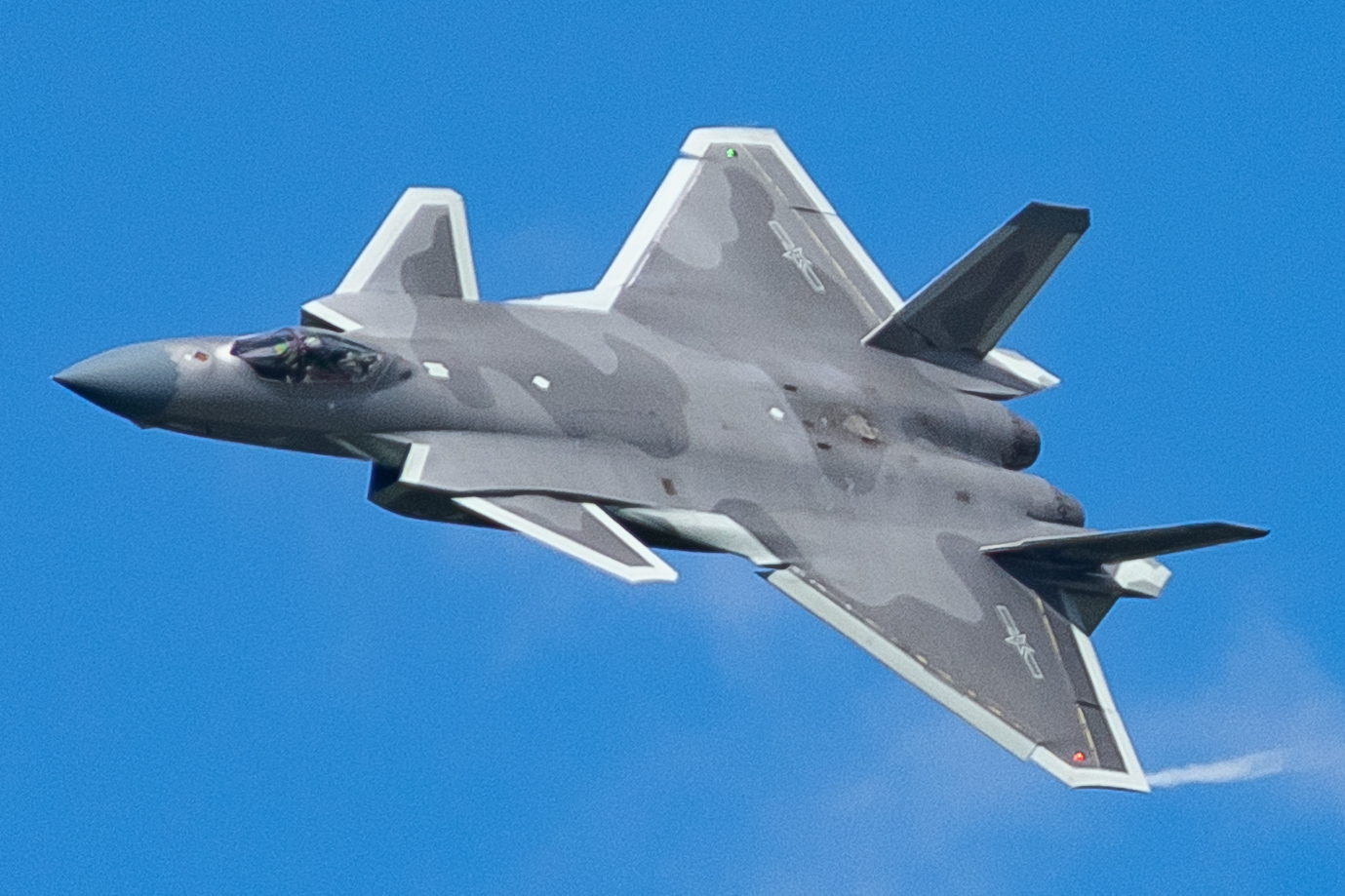
- J-20 flight at the 2022 Changchun Air Show

General information
- Type: Stealth air superiority fighter
- National origin: China
- Manufacturer: Chengdu Aircraft Corporation
- Status: In service
- Primary user: People's Liberation Army Air Force
- Number built: 500 (As of mid-2026)

History
- Manufactured: 2009–present
- Introduction date: 8 March 2017 (J-20); 3 September 2025 (J-20A/J-20S)
- First flight: 11 January 2011; 15 years ago
- Developed from: J-XX

The Chengdu J-20 (Chinese: 歼-20; pinyin: Jiān-Èrlíng), also known as Weilong (Chinese: 威龙; pinyin: Wēilóng; lit. 'Mighty Dragon', NATO reporting name: Fagin), is a twin-engine all-weather stealth fighter developed by China's Chengdu Aircraft Corporation between 2011 and 2018 for the People's Liberation Army Air Force (PLAAF). The J-20 is designed as an air superiority fighter with precision strike capability. The aircraft has three notable variants: the initial production model, the revised airframe variant with new engines and thrust-vectoring control, and the aircraft-teaming capable twin-seat variant.

Descending from the J-XX program of the 1990s, the aircraft made its maiden flight on 11 January 2011, and was officially revealed at the 2016 China International Aviation & Aerospace Exhibition. The aircraft entered service in March 2017 with the first J-20 combat unit formed in February 2018, making China the second country in the world to develop and field an operational stealth aircraft.

== Development ==
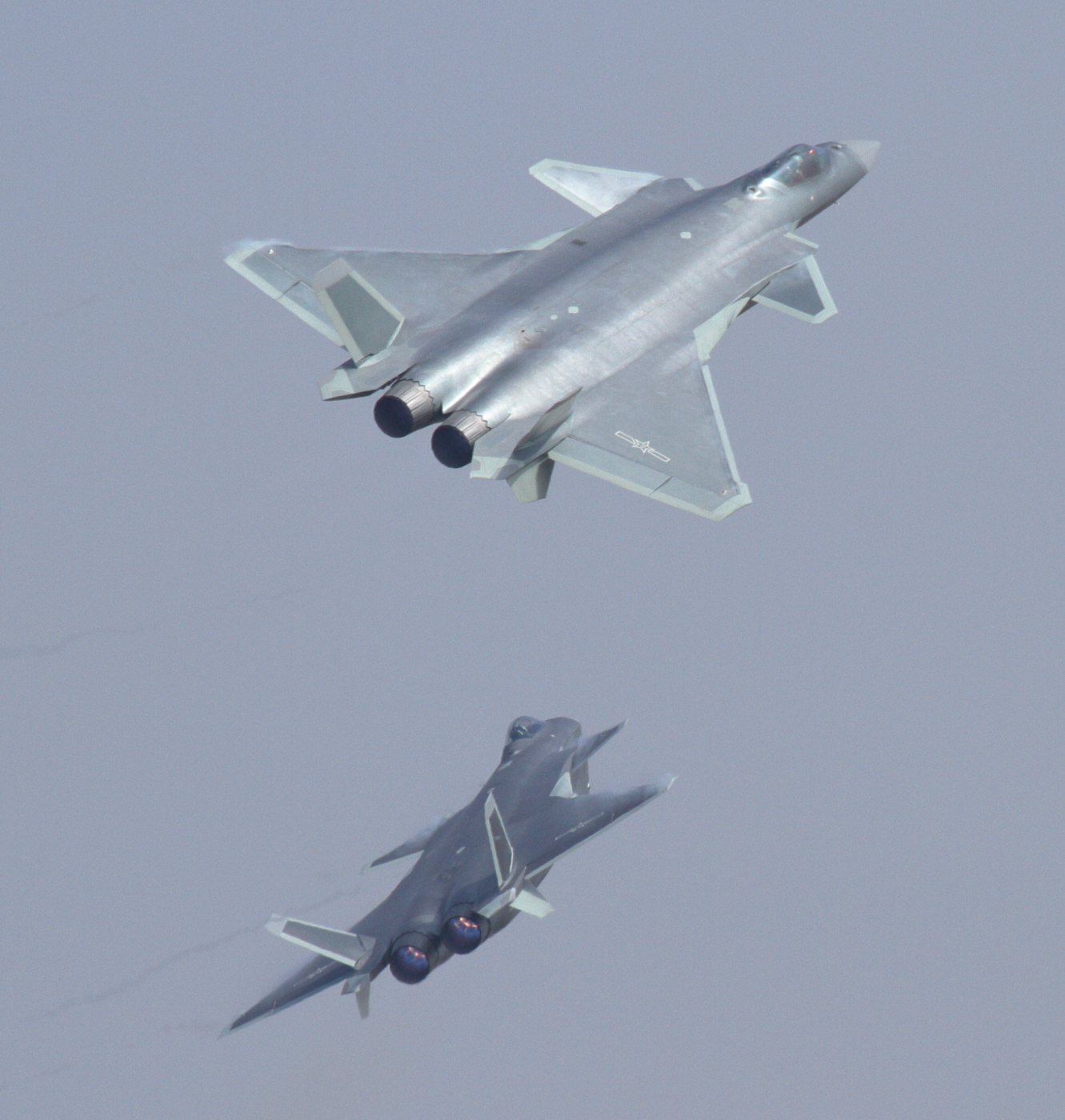
The two Chengdu J-20s making their first public appearance at Airshow China 2016

The J-20 emerged from the late-1990s J-XX program. Chengdu had previously used the double-canard configuration in the J-9, its first design and cancelled in the 1970s, and the J-10. The general configuration of Chengdu's J-XX design was first published internally in a 2001 Chengdu paper authored by Song Wencong that describes the advantages of an unstable canard and LERX configuration. In 2008, the PLAAF endorsed Chengdu Aircraft Corporation's proposal, Project 718.

In 2009, a senior PLAAF official revealed that the first flight was expected in 2010–11, with a service entry date by 2019. On 22 December 2010, the first J-20 prototype underwent high speed taxiing tests outside the Chengdu Aircraft Design Institute (CADI). Three months later, the first J-20 prototype made its maiden flight in Chengdu. The first prototype was painted with the number "2001". In May 2012, the second prototype took flight in the CADI facility.

Several changes were made to the third J-20 prototype, numbered "2011", which made its maiden flight in March 2014. The new prototype showed increasing sophistication in design, including numerous subtle changes from the first two prototypes. The new airframe introduced modified diverterless supersonic inlet (DSI) intakes, stealth coating, streamlined underwing fairings, and redesigned vertical stabilizers. Analysts noted new equipment and devices for multi-role operations, such as integrated targeting pods for precision-guided munition, and six additional passive infrared sensors can also be spotted around the aircraft.

In December 2015, the low rate initial production (LRIP) version of the J-20 was spotted by military observers.

In October 2017, Chinese state media reported that the designs of the J-20 had been finalized, and were ready for mass production as well as being combat-ready. In March 2018, Chinese military revealed other versions of the J-20 platform were being developed.

In January 2019, Chinese media reported that a twin-seat variant of the J-20 was rumored to be in development for use in tactical bombing, electronic warfare and carrier strike roles.

In November 2019, a J-20 painted in yellow primer coating was spotted during its flight testing by defense observers at the Chengdu Aircraft Corporation manufacturing facility. The aircraft is equipped with a new variant of WS-10 Taihang engines with serrated afterburner nozzles to enhance stealth. Report indicated Chengdu Aircraft Corporation terminated the manufacturing of J-20 with Russian engines in mid-2019.

Chinese media reported that a new variant of the J-20 was unveiled on July 8, 2020, and entered mass production the same day. The only change mentioned was that the new J-20 was to be equipped with thrust vectoring control. Conflicting reports emerged regarding the exact engine type. Analyst Andreas Rupprecht expressed skepticism regarding the use of Russian engines on the J-20, as he believes that the J-20 is using a variant of the WS-10, which he called the WS-10C. This engine has improved thrust, stealthier serrated afterburner nozzles, and higher reliability, but it is not designed for thrust vectoring, unlike the WS-10 TVC demonstrated on a J-10 in 2018 China International Aviation & Aerospace Exhibition. Analyst Jamie Hunter believed the new engine type is what he called WS-10B-3, a Chinese-made thrust-vectoring engine demonstrated on the 2018 Zhuhai Airshow.

In January 2021, South China Morning Post reported that the J-20 would replace its engines with the WS-10C. The WS-10C is considered an interim solution before Shenyang WS-15 passes evaluations. Moreover, WS-10C will not be equipped with the thrust-vectoring version of the J-20 that entered mass production in 2019, which still required further testing. Overall, Chinese engineers believe WS-10C is comparable with AL-31F in performance, and the replacement would also reduce China's dependency on Russian engines. The WS-10C-powered J-20 has officially showcased to the public on 28 September 2021 at Zhuhai Airshow.

In January 2021, Aviation Industry Corporation of China released computer renderings of the twin-seat variant of the J-20 fighter in celebration of the 10th anniversary of the jet's maiden flight. In February 2021, a South China Morning Post infographic depicted a twin-seat J-20 variant powered by thrust vectoring WS-10C. In October 2021, a taxiing prototype, dubbed J-20S by analysts, was spotted near Chengdu Aircraft Corporation facilities, making J-20S the first-ever two-seat stealth fighter. The twin-seat design allows the possibility for the second operator to coordinate attacks and reconnaissance missions from other friendly aircraft via networking or unmanned combat aerial vehicles (UCAVs) linked via "loyal wingman" systems and sensors. The advantage of a second operator includes the potential for better interpreting and exploiting the enormous sensory data that could overload the limited cognitive and processing capacity for a single human, especially in a contested air combat environment.

In March 2022, Chinese state media reported that the J-20, reportedly with one engine replaced by the WS-15, had performed flight trials. In December 2022, Chinese military analysts indicated the WS-15 was undertaking the last stage of testing and development. In late December, a prototype of the new J-20 variant was observed at Chengdu Aircraft Corporation facilities. The new variant was painted in yellow primer and different from previous J-20 aircraft in airframe design, with a low-profile blended canopy, aiming to optimize transonic flight performance and maneuverability. The new prototype was speculated to be used to test the WS-15 engine and thrust-vectoring. In March 2023, the executive of Aero Engine Corporation of China (AECC) announced that serial production of the WS-15 had started. FlightGlobal speculated that small-scale production and in-flight testing of the WS-15 with the J-20 fighter was underway. On 29 June 2023, a J-20 fighter in yellow primer was observed taking off from Chengdu Aircraft Cooperation airfield fitted with reportedly two WS-15 engines. A clear photo of a WS-15-equipped J-20A fighter taking flight appeared in 2024.

In October 2023, the Pentagon reported that PLAAF was upgrading the J-20, with enhancements such as extended weapon-carrying capability, thrust vectoring nozzles, control systems for unmanned aircraft teaming, and WS-15 high-thrust engines.

In November 2024, the Aviation Industry Corporation of China (AVIC) officially announced the twin-seat variant of the J-20, designated the J-20S. Functions of the variant include long-range operations with multi-role capabilities, including air superiority, precision strikes, manned-unmanned teaming, battlefield surveillance, electronic warfare, and command and control.

== Design ==
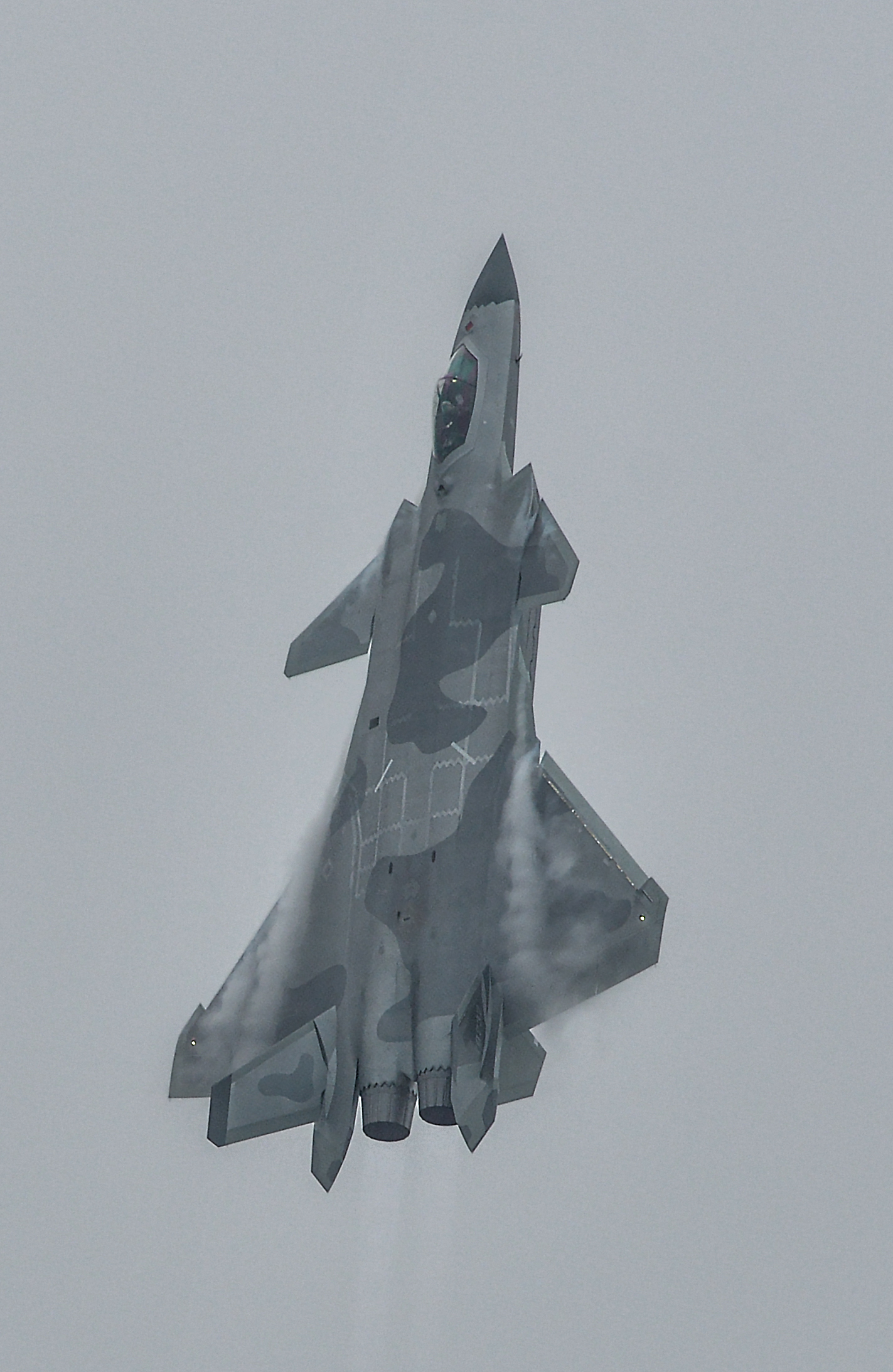
Chengdu J-20 showcasing maneuverability at Airshow China 2018

=== Characteristics ===
The J-20 has a long and blended fuselage, with a chiseled nose section and a frameless canopy. Immediately behind the cockpit are low-observable diverterless supersonic inlet (DSI) intakes. All-moving canard surfaces with pronounced dihedral are placed behind the intakes, followed by leading edge extensions (LERX) merging into the delta wing with forward-swept trailing edges. The aft section has twin outward-canted all-moving fins, short but deep ventral strakes, and conventional or low-observable engine exhausts.

One important design criterion for the J-20 is high stability. This requires sustained pitch authority at a high angle of attack, in which a conventional tail-plane would lose effectiveness due to stalling. On the other hand, a canard can deflect opposite to the angle of attack, avoiding stall and thereby maintaining control. A canard design is also known to provide good supersonic performance, excellent supersonic and transonic turn performance, and improved short-field landing performance compared to the conventional delta-wing design.

Leading edge extensions and body lift are incorporated to enhance performance in a canard layout. This combination is said by the designer to generate 1.2 times the lift of an ordinary canard delta, and 1.8 times more lift than an equivalent-sized pure delta configuration. The designer claims such a combination allows the use of a smaller wing, reducing supersonic drag without compromising transonic lift-to-drag characteristics that are crucial to the aircraft's turn performance.

The use of a bubble canopy, extensive flight-control surfaces, and canard configuration for angle-of-attack control indicates J-20's intention to operate in air-superiority missions and within-visual-range engagements. Chief test pilot Li Gang describes the J-20 as having comparable manoeuvrability to the Chengdu J-10 while being significantly better at low-observable (LO) performance. The J-20 is a multirole air superiority fighter, with the interceptor role being just one of the options.

=== Avionics and cockpit ===
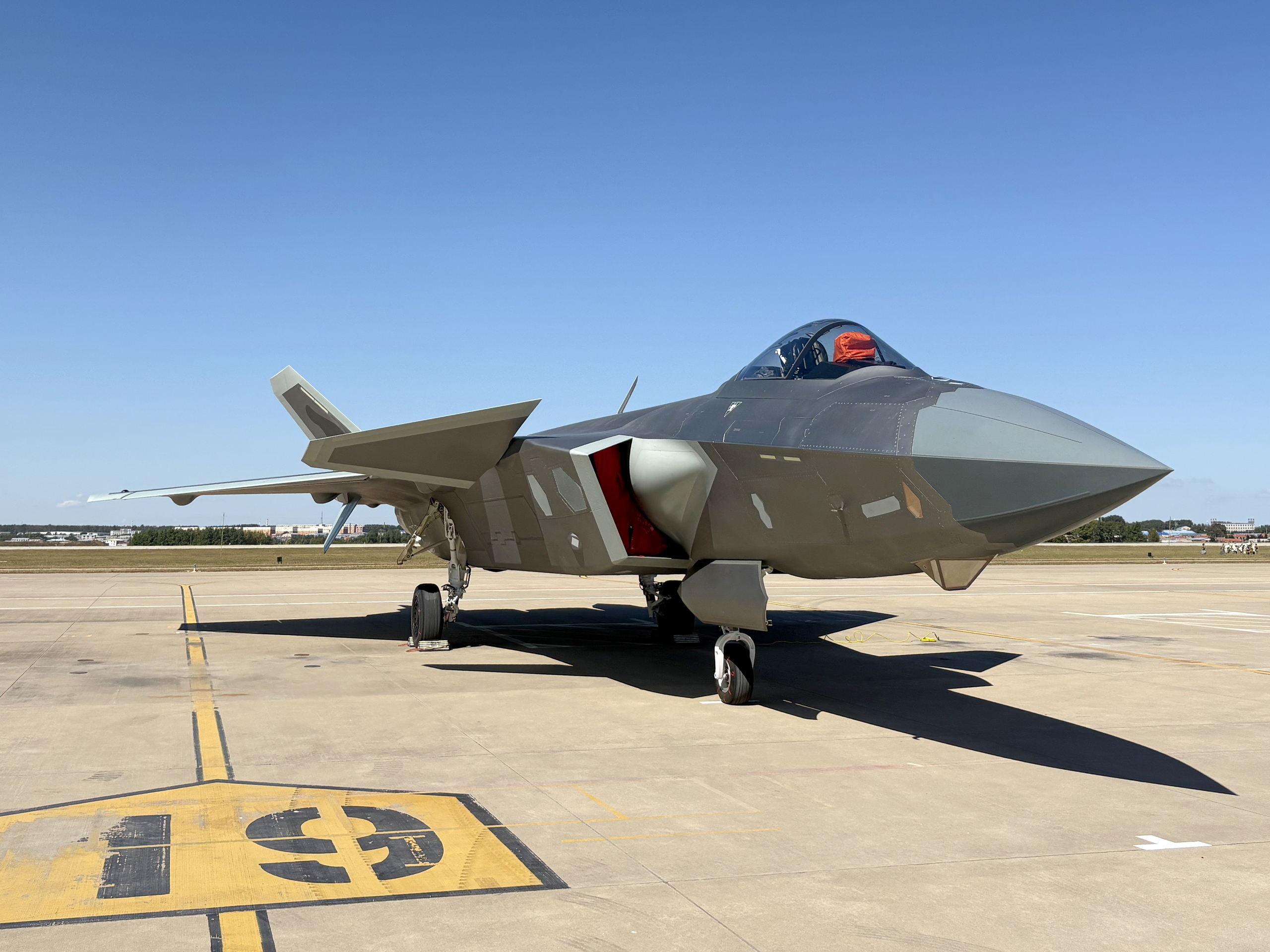
J-20's radome. An EOTS sensor is visible underneath the chin, while one of the six distributed aperture system sensor windows is visible on the side.

The J-20's avionics aim to obtain situational awareness through advanced sensor and data fusion while denying situational awareness to the adversary through stealth and electronic warfare. The J-20 features an integrated avionic suite consisting of multi-spectral sensors capable of providing omnidirectional coverage. Official information on the type of radar that J-20s use has not yet been released publicly. Some analysts, including Janes believe that J-20s is equipped with Type 1475 (KLJ-5) 100kW active electronically scanned array (AESA) radar with 1856 transmit/receive modules, Other analysts point out that, based on the nose cross-section of the J-20 and known data about a single transmit/receive module surface in the J-16's AESA radar system, J-20s could be upgraded to accept a system with 2000–2200 transmit/receive modules.

Six passive electro-optical sensor windows are mounted around the fuselage for an omnidirectional view, with two on the aircraft nose, two fitted under the fuselage, and two at the forward and aft of the cockpit. Under the nose, there is a chin-mounted enclosed electro-optical sensor, initially with a frontal field of view for air-to-air applications. This EO sensor is upgraded with 360-degree coverage on later J-20 models, such as the J-20A and J-20S. In 2015, Beijing A-Star Science and Technology was developing passive sensors, the EOTS-89 electro-optical targeting system and the EORD-31 infrared search and track, for the J-20. The passive sensors enhance the capability to engage stealthy aircraft. The J-20's usage of electro-optical sensors resembles the Lockheed Martin F-35 Lightning II's avionic suite, including the AN/AAQ-37 Distributed Aperture System (DAS) and electro-optical targeting system (EOTS).

According to Chinese media in February 2024, the J-20 is equipped to perform airborne early warning and control (AEW&C) operations.

The aircraft features a fully-digital glass cockpit with one primary large color liquid-crystal display (LCD) touchscreen, three smaller auxiliary displays, and a wide-angle holographic heads-up display (HUD). The size of the primary LCD screen is 610 mm × 230 mm (24 in × 9 in), 650 mm (25.63 in) diagonal size, with two illumination systems for operational redundancy. The aircraft is fitted with a helmet-mounted display (HMD) system, which displays combat information on the pilots' helmet visor and enables firing missiles at high off-boresight angles.

=== Armament ===
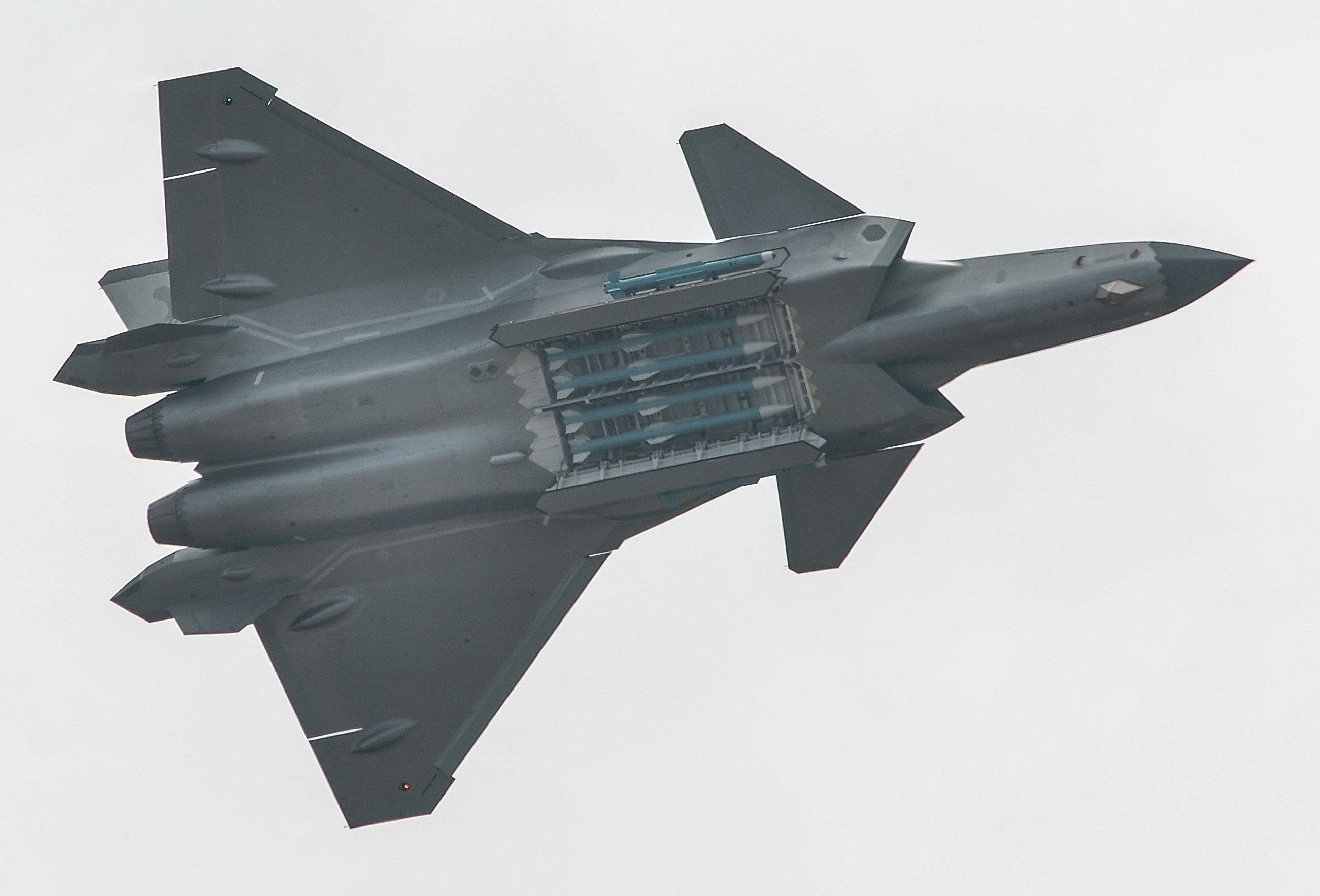
Chengdu J-20 displaying weapon bays during Airshow China 2018

The main weapon bay is capable of housing both long-range air-to-air missiles (AAM; PL-15 – PL-21) and precision-guided munitions (PGM; LS-6/50, LS-6/100, FT-7, CM-506 kg, etc.), while the two smaller lateral weapon bays behind the air inlets are intended for short-range AAMs (PL-10). These side bays allow closure of the bay doors prior to firing the missile, enhancing stealth and allowing the missile to be fired in the shortest possible time. The main bay may carry four medium/long-range AAMs, with each lateral bay carrying a short-range missile. In 2023, the United States reported that China planned to increase the J-20's missile capacity in "low-observable configuration". A staggered arrangement of six PL-15s is possible with modified rail launchers and missile frame with folded control surfaces. A thinner profile missile, designated PL-16, was also reportedly under development in 2020 to allow the additional internal carriage. The PL-16 features a compressed airframe, folded fins, and a high-performance dual-pulse motor to reduce size, while maintaining the same level of performance as the PL-15. The J-20 will likely use air-to-air missiles to engage in air superiority combat with other aircraft and to destroy high-value airborne assets. Supplemental missions may include launching anti-radiation missiles and air-to-ground munitions for precision-strike missions.

The wings include four hardpoints for auxiliary fuel tanks to extend the ferrying range and launch racks to carry weapons, such as the PL-15 and PL-17. The J-20 can carry eight PL-15 missiles externally with each hardpoint carrying two rail launchers. It is unlikely to be the primary carrier of external weapons as they compromise the aircraft's stealth, but this mode can be used when sacrificing stealth is permissible for the mission, or to provide additional carriage capacity behind stealthy friendly platforms.

The J-20 reportedly lacks an internal autocannon or rotary cannon, suggesting a preference for long-range engagements with missiles rather than short-ranged dogfights.

=== Engines ===
Engine models identified on the J-20
Engine type	Introduction	Capabilities		
Engine type	Introduction	LO	TVC	SC
Shenyang WS-10B	2015	No	No	No
Saturn AL-31FM2	2011	No	No	No
Shenyang WS-10C	2019	Yes	No	Yes (Note: Sources differs on whether WS-10C supports limited or full supersonic cruise)
Shenyang WS-10B-3	2019	Yes	Yes	No
Shenyang WS-15	2022	Yes	Yes	Yes
Note: aircraft and engine designations are cited from analysts' sources. Actual PLAAF designations could differ.

The Shenyang WS-10B reportedly powered low-rate initial production of the aircraft in 2015, and was used as an interim engine before the adoption of the AL-31 in 2017.

During the prototype phase, and on entering service in 2017, the fighter aircraft was powered by an improved Lyulka-Saturn AL-31 variant, reportedly the AL-31FM2 developed by Salyut. The engine had a "special power setting" thrust of 145 kN (32,600 lbf).

There are conflicting reports concerning the powerplant of the TVC-equipped J-20, dubbed J-20B. The powerplant has been identified as the AL-31FM2, or a variant of the WS-10; "WS-10C" by Andreas Rupprecht, or "WS-10B-3" by Jamie Hunter. The TVC-equipped WS-10B-3 was demonstrated at the 2018 China International Aviation & Aerospace Exhibition.

From 2019, the J-20 was powered by the Shenyang WS-10 (the WS-10C model), an afterburner turbofan engine manufactured by Shenyang Liming Aircraft Engine Company, which reportedly enables supercruise and high maneuverability. The WS-10C served as an interim engine before the more powerful Shenyang WS-15 became available.

The Shenyang WS-10C was selected as the replacement for AL-31 due to delays on the testing and production of the WS-15 engine. Aircraft powered by WS-10Cs were flying by September 2019. The engine has a thrust of 142-147 kN, a thrust-to-weight ratio of 9.5, providing necessary propulsion for J-20 to supercruise, and is fitted with serrated afterburner nozzles for enhanced rear-aspect stealth. Flights with prototypes powered by the WS-10C were underway by November 2020. The PLAAF began receiving WS-10C-powered aircraft by 2021. In January 2022, it was reported that aircraft powered by the WS-10C would be upgraded with TVC. Reportedly, the WS-10C enabled supercruise.

The powerplant that had always been planned for the J-20 is the Shenyang WS-15 with a thrust of 180 kN. The engine's extra power and cooling could also be used by future directed energy weapons and sensors.

Development of the WS-15 was reportedly ongoing in 2019. In March 2022, Chinese state media reported that the J-20 had performed flight trials with the engine and experienced significantly improved performance. It was also reported that newly produced aircraft, and even existing aircraft powered by the AL-31 engine, would be fitted with the WS-15. In April 2023, China reported that the WS-15 was ready for mass production. On 29 June 2023, a J-20B equipped with dual WS-15 engines was speculated to have made its maiden flight in Chengdu.

=== Stealth ===
Analysts have noted that the J-20's airframe employs a holistic approach to reduce its radar cross-section (RCS), uniquely combining canard wings with leading edge root extensions (LERX). The chined forebody, modified radar radome, and electroconductive canopy use a stealth shaping, yielding signature performance in a mature design similar to the Lockheed Martin F-22 Raptor. The diverterless supersonic inlets (DSI) leading into serpentine inlets (S-ducts) can obscure the reflective surface of the engine from radar detection. DSI intakes save weight, reduce complexity, and minimize radar signature. Additional low-observable features include a flat fuselage bottom holding an internal weapons bay, sawtooth edges on compartment doors, mesh coverings on cooling ports at the base of the vertical tails, embedded antennas and panels within the aircraft skin, and radar-absorbent coating materials. While the aircraft's fins/strakes and axisymmetric rear areas may expose the aircraft to radar, the overall stealth shaping of the J-20 is robust and considerably more capable than the Russian PAK-FA. Improvements regarding stealth were subsequently introduced - one prototype in 2014 was powered by WS-10 engines equipped with different jagged-edge nozzles and tiles for greater stealth. The J-20 production model with the serrated WS-10C engine is also capable of mitigating negative effects on rear-aspect stealth. The aircraft is also equipped with a retractable refueling probe embedded on the right side of the cockpit, to help the fighter to maintain stealth while flying greater distances.

Others have raised doubts about the use of canards on a low-observable design, stating that canards guarantee radar detection and compromise stealth. However, these criticisms may be unfounded. Canards and low observability are not necessarily mutually exclusive. Northrop Grumman's proposal for the U.S. Navy's Advanced Tactical Fighter (ATF) incorporated canards on a stealthy airframe. Lockheed Martin employed canards on a stealth airframe for the Joint Advanced Strike Technology (JAST) program during early development before dropping them due to complications with aircraft carrier recovery. McDonnell Douglas and NASA's X-36 featured canards and was considered to be extremely stealthy. RCS can be further reduced by controlling canard deflection through flight-control software, as on the Eurofighter. Similarly, Chinese aerospace researchers have concluded that, in terms of stealth, the canard delta configuration is comparable with the conventional arrangement.

Composite materials are employed to minimize the J-20's RCS. The DSI enables an aircraft to reach Mach 2.0 with a simpler intake than traditionally required, and improves stealth performance by eliminating radar reflections between the diverter and the aircraft's skin. Analysts have also noted that the J-20 DSI reduces the need for the application of radar-absorbent materials. A removable radar reflectors (Luneburg lens) is mounted on the underside of the J-20 to amplify its radar returns, concealing the real radar signature. In the 2021 production model, the emitter is re-engineered to be retractable.

In May 2018, Indian Air Chief Marshal B.S. Dhanoa claimed at a press conference that the radars on India's Su-30MKI fighters were "good enough" and could detect a J-20 from "several kilometers away" while answering a question on whether the J-20 posed a threat to India. However, experienced analysts didn't take Dhanoa's claim seriously due to his exaggeration and the lack of validity. Analyst Justin Bronk from Royal United Services Institute noted that Chinese were possibly flying the J-20 with radar reflectors during peacetime for safety and training purposes due to the potential for accidents and identification from other aircraft or ground installations. In a more recent report, Bronk also states that even with limited stealth, J-20 could hide and strike enemy critical platforms in an airspace with background clutter caused by non-stealth fighters and other electromagnetic noise.

In March 2022, Pacific Air Forces Commander General Kenneth S. Wilsbach confirmed a "relatively close encounter" between an F-35 and a J-20, and stated that the U.S. Air Force's E-3 Sentry AEW&C aircraft was unable to detect the J-20 in a timely manner and should be replaced by the E-7.

== Operational history ==
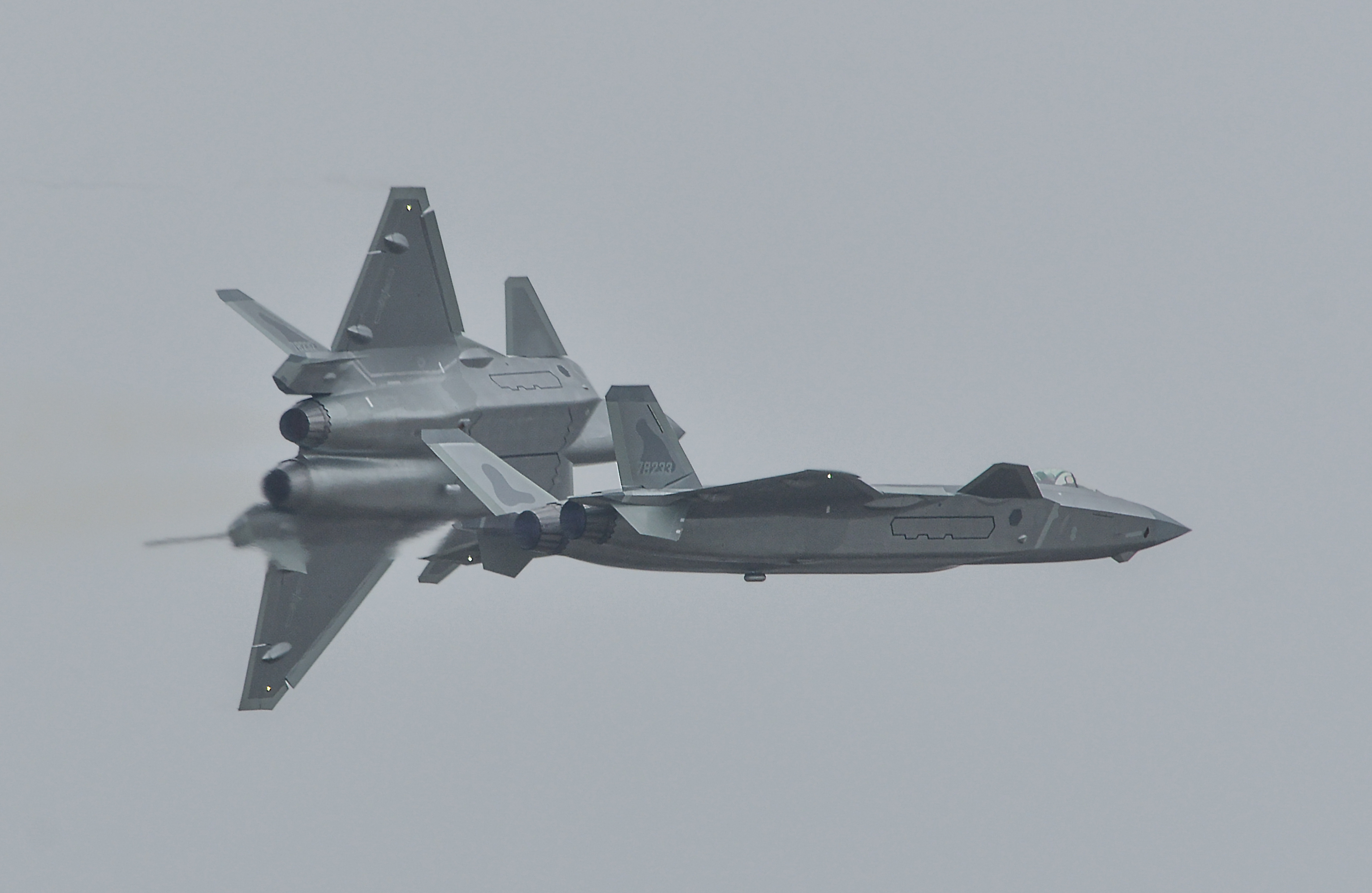
Two J-20 fighters breaking formation

=== Flight testing ===
On 10 December 2010, the first J-20 prototype was observed undertaking high-speed taxiing tests around the Chengdu Aircraft Design Institute (CADI) facilities before the maiden flight.

On 11 January 2011, the first J-20 prototype (numbered "2001") made its first flight, lasting about 15 minutes, with a Chengdu J-10B serving as the chase aircraft. After the successful flight, a ceremony was held, attended by the pilot, Li Gang, Chief Designer Yang Wei and General Li Andong, Deputy-Director of General Armaments. On 17 April 2011, a second test flight of an hour and 20 minutes took place. On 5 May 2011, a 55-minute test flight was held that included retraction of the landing gear. On 26 February 2012, the first prototype J-20 performed various low-altitude maneuvers.

On 10 May 2012, the second prototype (numbered "2002") underwent high-speed taxiing tests, and flight testing that began later that month. On 20 October 2012, photographs of the prototype with open compartment doors and a modified pitot tube emerged, (Note: Some sources claimed the aircraft with open compartment doors was a new prototype, however, this is likely a confusion caused by repainted numbers or doctored photos.) suggesting the possible inclusion of radar or sensors. In March 2013, images of the side weapon bays appeared, displaying a missile launch rail.

On 16 January 2014, the third J-20 prototype was revealed, showing new intakes, embedded engine nozzles, and stealth coating, as well as redesigned vertical stabilizers, and an Electro-Optical Targeting System. This particular aircraft, numbered "2011", performed its maiden flight on 1 March 2014 and is said to represent the initial pre-serial standard.

By the end of 2014, three more pre-serial prototypes were flown, each with incremental improvements to the design. The fourth prototype "2012" was tested on 26 July 2014, sharing many similarities with the "2011". This pair of aircraft was reportedly powered by AL-31FM2 engines. The fifth prototype, numbered "2013", took off on 29 November 2014. Three weeks later, number "2015" made its maiden flight on 19 December 2014, indicating rapid construction capability. Both prototypes featured retractable aerial refueling probes and infrared-suppression engine nozzles. The sixth prototype "2015" featured a slight alteration to tail booms, suggesting the installation of rear-facing sensors. PLAAF also modified an airliner to serve as the AESA radar test-bed for the J-20 program.

On 13 September 2015, a new prototype, marked "2016", began testing. It had noticeable improvements, such as apparently modified DSI bumps on the intakes. The DSI changes suggested the possibility of more powerful engines being used than its predecessors, likely to be an advanced 14-ton thrust derivative of the Russian AL-31 or Chinese Shenyang WS-10 turbofan engines. By 2020, the J-20 is scheduled to use the 18–19 ton WS-15 engine. The trapezoidal flight booms around the engines were further enlarged, possibly to accommodate rearwards-facing radars, electronic countermeasures, and jamming equipment. The fuselage was extended to the engine's exhaust nozzles. Compared to its "2014" and "2015" predecessors, the engine's surface area is further embedded inside the stealthy coating, providing greater rear-facing stealth against enemy detection.

On 24 November 2015, a new J-20 prototype, numbered "2017", took to the sky. The most significant change in the new prototype was the reshaped cockpit canopy, which provides the pilot with greater visibility. The lack of other design changes suggested that "2017" is very close to the final J-20 production configuration. Since '2017' was likely the last J-20 prototype, the low rate initial production (LRIP) of the J-20 is likely to begin in 2016. Chinese media reported that the design of the J-20 was frozen and finalized, as formal ceremonies were held for the prototype "2017" after completing the flight testing. The LRIP version later appeared in December 2015.

In March 2017, Chinese media reported that the fighter entered service. But it still faced a series of technical challenges that needed to be tackled, including the reliability of its WS-15 engines, the aircraft's flight control system, stealth coatings, hull materials, and infrared sensor. In September 2017, a newly built J-20 prototype (numbered "2021") was flight testing with Chinese-made WS-10 Taihang engines, featuring sawtoothed serration edge on its afterburning nozzles. The J-20 with indigenous WS-10C engines began production in 2019.

In September 2018, it was reported that issues with the development of the WS-15 engine, particularly the reliability of the turbine blades overheating at top speeds were fixed. The WS-15 reportedly required further development after failing final verification testing at the end of 2019. The COVID-19 pandemic imposed further delays. In March 2022, Chinese state media reported that the WS-15 engine completed final testing.

In October 2021, a twin-seat J-20 prototype, dubbed J-20S by analysts, was spotted taxiing inside Chengdu Aircraft Corporation facilities.

In November 2021, the US military reported that the J-20 was gradually receiving upgrades. In the same month, new J-20 two-seater variant began flight testing.

In December 2022, the prototype "2051" in yellow premier coat took flight. The new prototype had a redesigned canopy section and was speculated for engine and thrust-vectoring testing In March 2023, J-20 fitted with one Shenyang WS-15 engine reportedly performed experimental flights. On 29 June 2023, the J-20 prototype "2052" equipped with two distinguishable WS-15 engines took flight in Chengdu, captured by Chinese military enthusiasts and spread throughout social media. Another prototype with serial number "2053" also reportedly conducted a test flight in the same period with WS-15 engines. Despite the lack of clear pictures, circumstantial evidence such as a photo of the engine installation ceremony, lack of censorship by the authorities, and modified airframe suggested the WS-15 was evidently mounted, though Janes Information Services noted the engines on trial apparently lacks the thrust vectoring control (TVC) paddles, which could be added later. According to editor of Beijing-based Aerospace Knowledge magazine, vector thrust control and variable cycle engines were "likely under development". In 2024, clear photo evidence confirmed that J-20 prototypes took flight with the WS-15, and the engine approached the final stage of testing before serial production.

In December 2024, the J-20S prototype '2035' was confirmed flying. The J-20S prototype carried camera pods and served as a chase plane for Chengdu's new stealth aircraft demonstrator, the Chengdu J-36. Between November 2021 and March 2025, five separate J-20S prototypes were built for flight testing.

=== Production ===
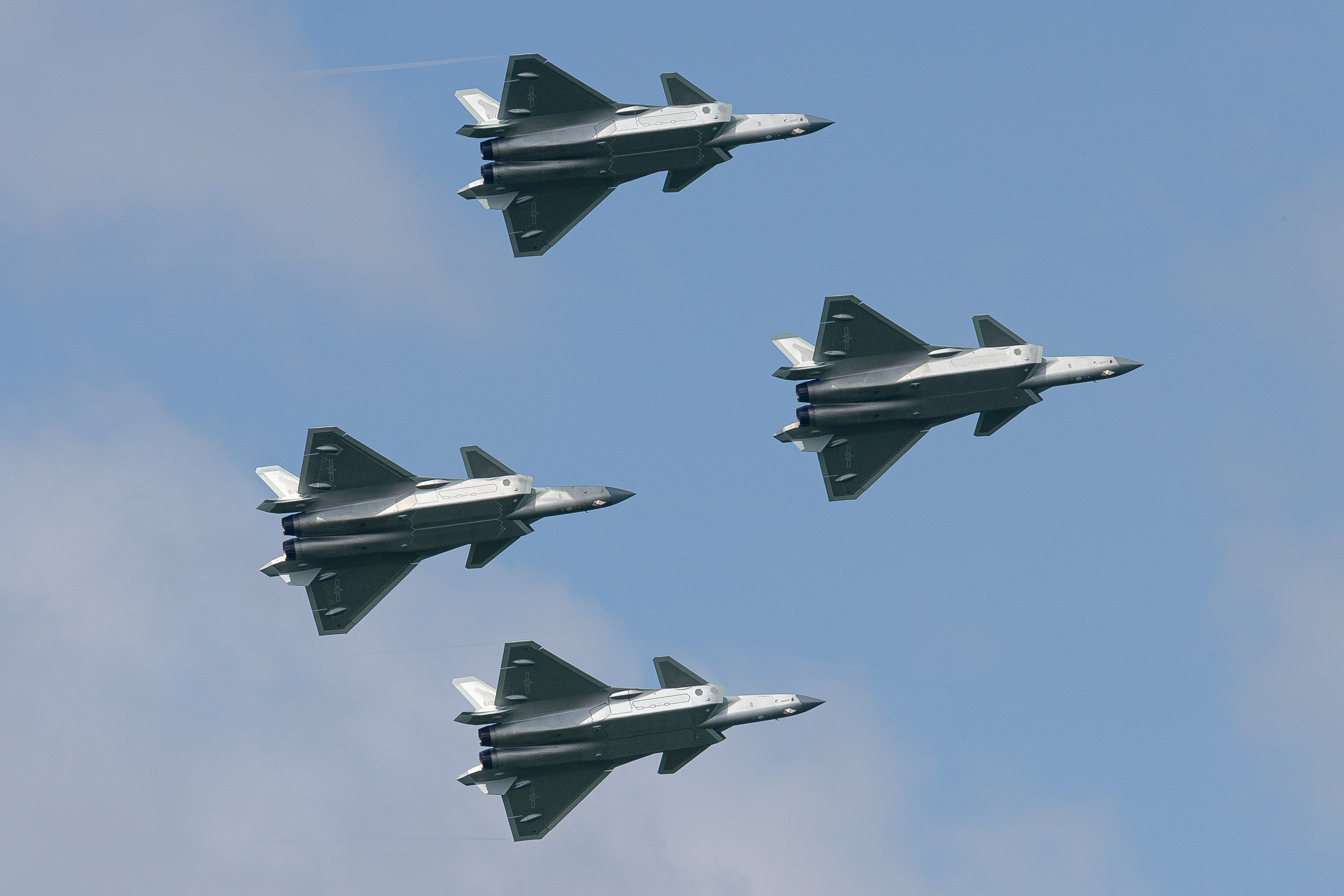
Four J-20 in formation at Changchun Airshow 2023

In late December 2015, a new J-20 numbered 2101 was spotted. Chinese media suggested the stealth aircraft will enter production ahead of schedule. In July 2016, pre-production models with dark-grey paint and low visibility insignias were spotted inside a Chengdu Aircraft Corporation (CAC) facility. The production rate indicated an intended initial operational capability (IOC) date of around 2017–2018.

In October 2017, Chinese media reported that CAC initiated the serial production for the J-20 and is on a path towards achieving full operational capability with the People's Liberation Army Air Force (PLAAF). State media described the CAC's production rate as "stable", meaning achieving a regular production rate for minimal economies of scale. The production rate was expected to be three aircraft per month.

In 2019, CAC began manufacturing J-20 fitted with Chinese-made WS-10 Taihang engines. J-20s manufactured after mid-2019 were no longer fitted with Russian AL-31F turbofan engines. The PLAAF began receiving WS-10C powered aircraft by 2021. The production rate of J-20 was expected to be further increased.

In January 2022, United States Air Force (USAF) analyst Derek Solen estimated 50 to 74 fighters were in service based on open-source intelligence. In August 2022, USAF analyst Li Xiaobing reported that over 150 had been delivered; claims of 150 being in service had been made in 2021.

In late 2022, Andreas Rupprecht estimated total production at 208 aircraft - including pre-production aircraft - based on interpreting serial numbers. The International Institute for Strategic Studies (IISS) reported more than 140 aircraft in service in 2022. According to Bronk, the aircraft at the 2022 China International Aviation & Aerospace Exhibition had visible improvements to manufacturing tolerance and quality control. According to the Chinese military, CAC accelerated production and delivery by implementing a pulse assembly line. According to Chinese military analysts, this was a response to increasing numbers of F-35 fighters deployed by the United States in the Asia-Pacific.

In 2023, the reported number of J-20s exceeded the 187 F-22 airframes. IISS reported that more than 200 aircraft were produced by the end of 2023.

In mid-2024, Janes Information Services estimated that approximately 195 aircraft were in PLAAF service, with more than 70 aircraft inducted between July 2023 and June 2024. The Diplomat reported up to 250 aircraft were produced by June 2024, with an annual production rate of 100 aircraft per year. A conservative estimate suggested the number of aircraft could reach 800 by 2030. In September 2025, images showed that the J-20 fleet exceeded 300 aircraft.

In 2025, the AVIC maintained the annual production rate of 100-120 aircraft, with the introduction of J-20A and J-20S. By mid-2025, there were around 300 J-20s entered PLAAF service. The Royal United Services Institute estimated, based on the information available, that the total production of all variants would reach 1,000 airframes in 2030.

In mid-2026, around 500 J-20s were produced and delivered to the PLAAF.

=== Training ===
Pilot training for the J-20 started as early as March 2017, after the fighter entered limited service in the initial operational capability (IOC) phase. During the IOC phase, the fighters are equipped with radar reflectors, also known as the Luneburg lens, to enlarge and conceal the actual radar cross-section.

The J-20 participated in its first combat exercise in January 2018, practicing beyond-visual-range maneuvers against China's fourth-generation fighters such as J-16 and J-10C. The exercise was reported to be realistic. Training with mixed generations allows pilots to become familiar with fifth-generation aircraft, and to develop tactics both for and against them. Chinese Ministry of National Defense also revealed that J-20 has conducted night confrontation missions during several coordinated tactical training exercises.

The J-20 participated in its first over-ocean combat exercise in May 2018.

In April 2022, the J-20 is confirmed to be engaged in regular maritime patrols in the East China Sea and the South China Sea for routine training missions, in a statement released by CAC.

In March 2023, Chinese state media reported that the PLAAF uses J-20 fighters to simulate the F-35 in surface strike missions during opposing force training. The exercise tested the command chain and kill chain integration between the PLA Ground Force and Air Force, with two branches sharing real-time data for combined air defense missions and training tactics against stealth fighters.

=== Deployment ===
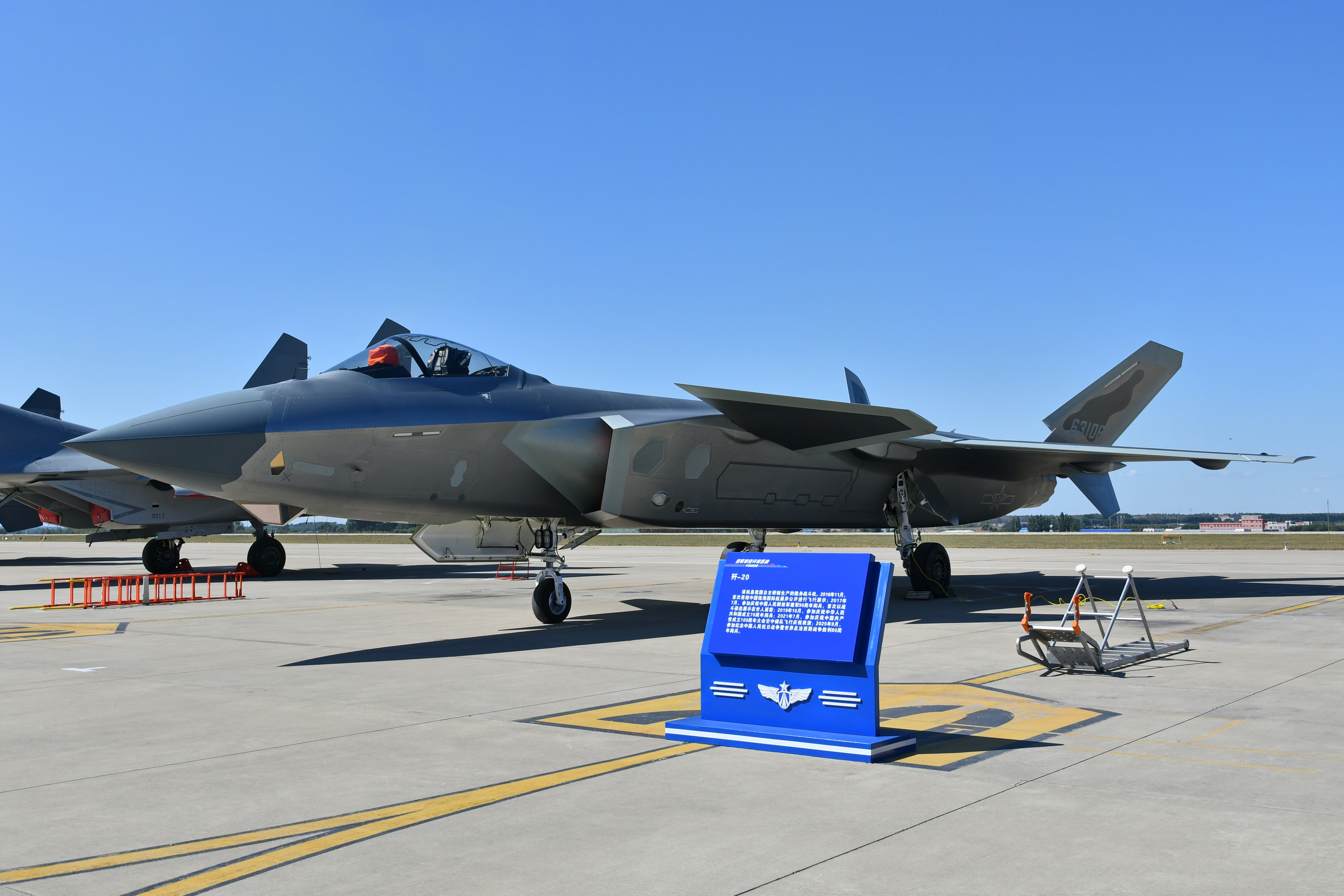
A J-20 on display at the PLAAF Open Day in 2025

On 12 December 2016, at least six J-20s were observed in PLAAF air bases, with tail numbers 78271-78276 identified. Another six were believed to be ready for delivery by the end of December 2016. On 9 March 2017, Chinese media revealed that the J-20 had entered service in the Chinese Air Force, making China the second country in the world to field a 5th-generation stealth fighter. Chinese National Defense Ministry confirmed the service status in September 2017. It is anticipated that frontline units could be equipped with the low observable combat aircraft before 2020. The International Institute for Strategic Studies (IISS) proposed that, as the trend continues, the US could lose its monopoly on operational stealth aircraft.

The PLAAF began inducting J-20s into combat units in February 2018, one month after its first combat drill. The aircraft entered service with the 9th Fighter Brigade based at Wuhu Air Base, Anhui province in late 2018 – March 2019, replacing Su-30MKK fighters previously deployed there.

On 27 August 2019, the Central Military Commission of the People's Liberation Army approved the J-20 as the PLAN's future primary fighter, beating out the Shenyang FC-31. Arguments for the J-20 state that the plane is far more advanced, longer-ranged, and carries a heavier payload than the FC-31, while those supporting the FC-31 argued that it is cheaper, lighter, and far more maneuverable than the J-20. The J-20 would likely be commissioned upon the Type 003 aircraft carrier under construction, however, the length of the J-20 means that it has to be shortened to be considered operable on an aircraft carrier.

On 26 June 2021, Chinese state media reported that J-20 fighters were deployed to PLAAF units monitoring the East China Sea and Taiwan Strait. Analysts suggested that the PLAAF aimed to equip at least one to two brigades in each of the five theater commands before 2026. By 2022, J-20s were deployed in combat units in all five theater commands; this was officially confirmed in September 2022.

In March 2022, USAF general Kenneth Wilsbach confirmed that USAF F-35s have encountered J-20s deployed over the East China Sea. In April 2022, Chinese state media reported J-20 started regular patrol in the South China Sea.

According to the China Aerospace Studies Institute (CASI), three combat brigades received the J-20 by 2021, another three by 2022, and another two by 2024. In June 2024, Janes reported 12 brigades with J-20s, of which three (1st, 9th, and an unidentified unit at Changsha-Ningxiang) were equipped only with J-20s. Asia Times reported that PLAAF had prioritized deploying J-20s for airbases close to China's maritime border, and believed J-20's long combat range is well-suited for high-speed interceptions, strategic area defense, and long-range strike missions over the First- and Second-island chain.

In July 2025, the twin-seat J-20S variant was observed painted in PLAAF camouflage and serial numbers associated with the PLAAF 172nd Air Brigade, indicating the variant has either entered or is close to entering service.

On 3 September 2025, Chinese state media China Daily announced that the single-seat upgraded J-20A variant and twin-seat J-20S made their maiden debut as part of the PLAAF arsenal.

=== Summary of program milestones ===
The following is a table of significant milestones in the J-20 program history as gleaned from public sources and cited previously in the present article:

J-20 program milestone	Date	Public sources	Notes
Precursor program (J-XX)	late-1990s		Solicitation for competing 5th generation fighter designs from Chengdu Aircraft Corporation and Shenyang Aerospace Corporation
Program inception	~2008		CAC's twin-engine design with canards (project 718) selected by PLA; 1st flight expected to occur in the 2010-2011 time frame with service entry by 2019
First flight	11 January 2011		~15 minutes first flight made by prototype number "2002"
Low rate initial production	~December 2015		J-20 design reportedly frozen after flight by prototype number "2017" in late 2015; first suspected LRIP airframe (number "2101") appeared by 12/2015
Initial operational capability	~2017–2018		Entry into service and pilot training may have begun by March 2017 with initial combat exercises involving J-20s by January 2018
Active use of domestic powerplant	mid-2019 to mid-2021		J-20s produced after mid-2019 may all use domestic WS-10C engines instead of Russian AL-31F engines; J-20s with WS-10C in active service by June 2021
100th airframe	2021–2022		CAC announces mass production of J-20s in December 2021; US defense analysts estimate the number of produced and delivered J-20s to be at 50 to over 150 during the period from 2021 to mid-2022
200th airframe	late 2022–late 2023		Conservative western estimates place the number of J-20s in excess of 187 by the end of 2022 to early 2023; the total number of airframes in excess of 200 was possible by late 2022 and all but certain by the end of 2023
Tests with the WS-15	29 June 2023		First flight of prototype number "2052", a J-20 variant sporting two WS-15 engines, the intended powerplant for the aircraft, and other enhancements
200th to 250th airframe	~end of 2023		end of 2023 estimate by the International Institute for Strategic Studies and Netherlands' Scramble magazine
300th airframe	mid of 2025		mid of 2025 estimate by the Royal United Services Institute
500th airframe	mid of 2026		mid of 2026 estimate by Andreas Rupprecht

== Variants ==
=== J-20 ===
Flight testing began with prototypes in late 2010, with maiden flight in 2011. The variant entered serial production in October 2017. J-20 was incorporated into training units of the People's Liberation Army Air Force in March 2017 and combat units in February 2018. Initially, this variant was dubbed J-20A by analysts, while the later model with WS-15 engine was dubbed J-20B.

=== J-20A ===
Initially incorrectly referred to as the 'J-20B' by defense analysts. It's an improved J-20 variant with a slightly raised cockpit, enlarged spine, reshaped nosecone, and modified engine intakes optimized for the WS-15 engines. Internal upgrades include an overhaul of software, avionics, and sensor suites, refinements in airframe material and structures, improvements in signature reduction, and significant advancements in power and thermal management. Prototype #2051 was first spotted in December 2022. Officially debuted as part of the PLAAF aircraft fleet on 3 September 2025.

=== J-20S ===
The twin-seat variant of the J-20 is designated J-20S. The aircraft was officially revealed at the Zhuhai Airshow in 2024. Initially speculated as J-20S, J-20AS, or J-20B by defense analysts, the twin-seat version of J-20 was first spotted in October 2021, taxiing inside a Chengdu Aircraft Corporation facility in yellow primer paint and untreated composite, making it the first twin-seat stealth fighter in the world. Officially debuted as part of the PLAAF aircraft fleet on 3 September 2025.

The twin-seat design allows the possibility for the second operator to conduct airborne early warning and control (AEW&C) missions, which J-20 would leverage its avionics and networking capability to provide battlespace surveillance, battle management, and intelligence analysis. Another possibility is to coordinate attacks and reconnaissance missions from unmanned combat aerial vehicles (UCAVs) linked via "loyal wingman" systems and sensors. China is known to be developing various "loyal wingman" prototypes such as AVIC Dark Sword. In addition to aircraft teaming, a twin-seat configuration may also provide marginal benefits in pilot training and strike missions.

In 2026, Chinese state media confirmed the J-20S is a multi-role aircraft designed for air superiority, precision strikes against ground and maritime targets, airborne early warning and control (AEW&C), electronic warfare, and manned-unmanned teaming (MUM-T) operations.

The advantage of a second operator includes the potential for better interpreting and exploiting the enormous sensory data, which could overload the limited cognitive and processing capacity of a single human. The back-seater operator would focus on managing the manned or unmanned aircraft fleet, reducing the pilot's workload in a contested air combat environment.

In August 2022, a Chinese defense publication suggested the twin-seat variant could be used as an electronic warfare platform. In October 2022, Chinese media showcased the concept of the J-20 two-seater controlling stealth Hongdu GJ-11 unmanned combat aerial vehicle, and the back seat is designated for the weapons officer. It could also potentially manage the LJ-1, a low-end modular drone platform.

== Strategic implications ==
=== Political ===
The first test flight coincided with a visit by United States Secretary of Defense Robert Gates to China. The tests were reportedly suspected by the Pentagon to be a possible signal to the visiting US delegation by the Chinese military. Speaking to reporters in Beijing, secretary Gates said, "I asked President Hu about it directly, and he said that the test had absolutely nothing to do with my visit and there had been a pre-planned test.", noting that Hu appeared surprised at his inquiry. Michael Swaine, an expert on the PLA and United States–China military relations, said that "At the very least, it's possible, and some would argue it's quite possible that senior officials in the leadership did not know that this flight test would occur on this precise day". Abraham M. Denmark, of the Center for New American Security in Washington, noted that, while “China must be aware of the political signal being sent by these tests," Hu would likely have been unaware. Chinese state media reportedly quoted unnamed Defense Ministry officials as saying that the tests were "not targeted at any country or any specific objectives", while an essay on China's Defense Ministry urged the United States to "stop pointing fingers at the J-20" and criticized its deployment of naval and air forces around China as being a greater threat to peace.

=== Military ===
Robert Gates downplayed the significance of the aircraft by questioning how stealthy the J-20 may be, but stated the J-20 would "put some of our capabilities at risk, and we have to pay attention to them, we have to respond appropriately with our own programs." The U.S. Director of National Intelligence James R. Clapper testified that the United States knew about the program for a long time and that the test flight was not a surprise.

In 2011, Loren B. Thompson (Lexington Institute), echoed by a 2015 RAND Corporation report, felt that J-20's combination of forward stealth and long-range puts America's surface assets at risk and that a long-range maritime strike capability may cause the United States more concern than a short-range air-superiority fighter like the F-22. In its 2011 Annual Report to Congress, the Pentagon described the J-20 as "a platform capable of long-range, penetrating strikes into complex air defense environments." A 2012 report by the U.S.-China Economic and Security Review Commission suggests that the United States may have underestimated the speed of development of the J-20 and several other Chinese military development projects.

In the early 2010s, Western observers were not able to reach a consensus on the J-20's primary role or its specific capabilities. Experts and analysts called into question many of China's claims and stated it was considered a low observability aircraft but did not fall in the category of a true stealth aircraft based on U.S. Military standards.

After the deployment announcement in 2018, several analysts noted that the experience that the PLAAF will gain with the J-20 would give China a significant edge over India, Japan, and South Korea, which have struggled to design and produce their own fifth-generation fighters on schedule. However, despite the failure of their indigenous projects, Japan and South Korea would soon operate the imported F-35A in 2019 equipped with better situational awareness and jet propulsion technology, negating this potential technological disparity. United States Marine Corps created a full-scale replica (FSR) of a Chengdu J-20 in December 2018. The replica was spotted parked outside the Air Dominance Center at Savannah/Hilton Head International Airport in Georgia. The United States Marine Corps later confirmed that the aircraft was built for training.

By 2019, aviation researchers believed that the progress of J-20 signified that China had surpassed Russia in the application of contemporary aviation technologies such as composite materials, advanced avionics, and long-range weapons systems. According to Justin Bronk of the Royal United Services Institute, the J-20 is one of the examples of how China has transitioned from the dependency of Russian technology to developing indigenous sensors and weapons that are superior to those of Russia; and how China is beginning to build a clear lead over Russia in most aspects of combat aircraft development in the 2020s.

In March 2022, United States Air Force (USAF) General Kenneth Wilsbach said that the J-20s were being used in a professional manner and that he was "relatively impressed" with the Chinese command and control structure and AEW&C capabilities, after confirming that the two nations' air forces had an encounter in the South China Sea involving F-35s and J-20s. In separate comments discussing the E-3 Sentry on a YouTube video posted by the Mitchell Institute for Aerospace Studies, the general suggested that, among other issues surrounding maintenance, the aircraft would be insufficient for timely detection of the J-20 or similar platforms, saying that "those sensors that we rely on with the E-3 aren’t really capable in the 21st century fight". In another press conference, Wilsbach qualified his earlier remarks by stating that he would not "lose sleep about the J-20", USAF Chief of Staff Gen. Charles Q. Brown reflected a similar sentiment, but noted that “if we don't modernize, then there's probably the potential to lose sleep,” possibly in reference to the sixth-generation Next Generation Air Dominance program.

In June 2022, the US Air Force reactivated the 65th Aggressor Squadron, equipped with F-35A to conduct opposing force training and replicate fifth-generation threats. Nellis Air Force Base planned to further upgrade its fleet with more F-35s and F-22s to replicate fifth-generation fighters.

In July 2024, USAF Major Joshua Campbell of CASI recommended that, for future combat systems, the USAF evaluate the concept on which the twin-seat J-20 fighter was based. Campbell found merit in China's approach to human-to-machine interaction in an operationally limited (CDO-L) combat environment with information saturation. He believed the twin-seat J-20, with its secondary pilot serving as a control operator for managing collaborative combat aircraft (CCA) and other aircraft in formation, could serve as an inspiration for the F-15EX program and air platforms beyond traditional roles before more advanced AI decision-makers become available.

=== Defense media ===
Western sources contribute the idea that J-20 is optimized for anti-access/area denial (A2/AD) engagements, while Chinese sources universally describe J-20 as an air-superiority fighter meant to engage other fighters. Rod Lee, research director at the China Aerospace Studies Institute of the Air University, believes J-20 is intended to be primarily used for destroying high-value airborne assets, which is an alternative way of establishing air superiority. Supplemental missions may include launching anti-radiation missiles and air-to-ground munitions. Rod Lee believes the J-20 has the maneuverability to engage in air-superiority combat with other aircraft, but the PLAAF has de-emphasized the traditional attrition warfare while advocating the "systems destruction" approach because they believe it is more effective.

Matthew Jouppi of Aviation Week noted the ill-informed assumptions that existed in defense circles and argued that the United States has not adequately addressed the threats posed by growing Chinese airpower.

According to Rouble Sharma of GlobalData, the development of the J-20 showed a robust pace and displayed the Chinese aviation industry's in-house research, design, and manufacturing capabilities. The indigenization of critical components such as the jet engines, avionics, radar, and weapons systems helped to fast-track the production rate, and constant tests and upgrades fixed teething and performance issues between batches. GlobalData estimated that in 2022, the Chengdu J-20 cost US$100 million per aircraft, and the whole project cost US$30 billion.

== Operators ==
China

- People's Liberation Army Air Force
  - 172nd Aviation Regiment, Cangzhou Airbase, Hebei; testing and training unit and second to receive J-20 fighters.
  - 1st Fighter Brigade, Anshan Air Base, Liaoning
  - 5th Fighter Brigade, Guilin Air Base, Guangxi
  - 8th Fighter Brigade, Changxing Airbase, Zhejiang
  - 9th Fighter Brigade, Wuhu Air Base, Anhui
  - 41st Fighter Brigade, Wuyishan Airbase, Fujian
  - 56th Fighter Brigade, Zhengzhou Airbase, Henan
  - 97th Fighter Brigade, Dazu Airbase, Chongqing
  - 111th Fighter Brigade, Korla Airbase, Xinjiang

== Specifications ==
Data from Tsinghua University

General characteristics

- Crew: one (pilot)
- Length: 21.2 m (69 ft 7 in)
- Wingspan: 13.01 m (42 ft 8 in)
- Height: 4.69 m (15 ft 5 in)
- Wing area: 73 m^{2} (790 sq ft)
- Empty weight: 17,000 kg (37,479 lb)
- Gross weight: 25,000 kg (55,116 lb)
- Max takeoff weight: 37,000 kg (81,571 lb)
- Fuel capacity: 12,000 kg (26,000 lb) internally
- Powerplant: 2 × Shenyang WS-10C afterburning turbofan (Note: WS-10C was used on the production J-20; early production batches were equipped with the Salyut AL-31FM2 with similar thrust rating.), 142–147 kN (32,000–33,000 lbf) with afterburner
- Powerplant: 2 × Shenyang WS-15 afterburning turbofan, 161.86–180 kN (36,390–40,470 lbf) with afterburner

Performance

- Maximum speed: Mach 2.0, 2,130 km/h (1,320 mph) at altitude
- Range: 5,500 km (3,400 mi, 3,000 nmi) with 2 external fuel tanks
- Combat range: 2,000 km (1,200 mi, 1,100 nmi)
- Service ceiling: 20,000 m (66,000 ft)
- g limits: +9/-3
- Rate of climb: 304 m/s (59,800 ft/min)
- Wing loading: 340 kg/m^{2} (69 lb/sq ft)

Armament

- Maximum weapon capacity: 11,000 kg (24,000 lb)
- Internal weapon bays
  - PL-10 short-range AAM
  - PL-12 medium-range AAM
  - PL-15 long-range AAM
  - PL-16 long-range AAM (In development, to be integrated)
  - PL-21 very-long-range AAM (In development, to be integrated)
  - LS-6/50 and LS6/100 small-diameter PGB (intended)
  - FT-7 small-diameter PGB (intended)
  - CS/BBM2 small-diameter PGB (intended)
  - CM-506KG small-diameter PGB (intended)
- External hardpoints
  - PL-15 long-range AAM
  - PL-17 very-long-range AAM
  - 4× under-wing pylon capable of carrying drop tanks.

Avionics

- Unspecified, either with NRIET Type 1475 (KLJ-5A) AESA Radar, or an unknown type with higher performance.
- EOTS-86 electro-optical targeting system (EOTS)
- EORD-31 infrared search and track
- Electro-optical distributed aperture system

== See also ==
- Fifth-generation jet fighter
- J-XX

Aircraft of comparable role, configuration, and era

- Lockheed Martin F-22 Raptor
- Lockheed Martin F-35 Lightning II
- Shenyang J-35
- Sukhoi Su-57

Related lists

- List of fighter aircraft
- List of aircraft produced by China

== Sources ==
- The International Institute for Strategic Studies (2023). The Military Balance 2023. Routledge. ISBN 978-1-032-50895-5.
- The International Institute for Strategic Studies (2024). The Military Balance 2024. Routledge. ISBN 978-1-032-78004-7.
- Kopp, Carlo (9 January 2011). The Strategic Impact of China's J-XX (J-20) Stealth Fighter (Report). Air Power Australia. Archived from the original on 8 September 2020.
- Kopp, Carlo; Goon, Peter A. (January 2011). Chengdu J-XX (J-20) Stealth Fighter Prototype: A Preliminary Assessment (Report). Air Power Australia. Archived from the original on 24 April 2020.
- Rupprecht, Andreas (March 2011). "Enter the Dragon: The Chengdu J-20". Combat Aircraft Monthly. Vol. 12, no. 3. Ian Allan Publishing. pp. 34–41.
- Sweetman, Bill (2005). Lockheed Stealth. Minneapolis, Minnesota: Zenith Press. ISBN 0-76031-940-5.
