= 1927 in China =

- Decades: 1900s; 1910s; 1920s; 1930s; 1940s
- See also: Other events of 1927; History of China • Timeline • Years

Events in the year 1927 in China.

== Incumbents ==
- President of the Republic of China:
  - V. K. Wellington Koo(署理) ( 1 October 1926 – 16 June 1927 )
- Premier of the Republic of China:
  - V. K. Wellington Koo ( 1 October 1926 – 16 June 1927 )
  - Pan Fu ( 18 June 1927 – 2 June 1928 )

== Events ==
=== March ===
- 21–27 March – Nanking Incident

=== April ===
- 3 April – Hankou Incident
- 12 April – Shanghai massacre
- 15 April – Whampoa Military Academy purge

=== May ===
- 22 May – 1927 Gulang earthquake

=== July ===
- 15 July – Wuhan coup

=== August ===
- 1 August – Nanchang uprising
- 28–31 August – The Far Eastern Championship Games take place in Shanghai.

=== September ===
- 30 September – Start of Battle of Shantou

=== October ===
- 1 October – End of Battle of Shantou

=== December ===
- 1 December – Marriage of Chiang Kai-shek and Soong Mei-ling in Shanghai.

== Births ==
- 5 March – Wang You-theng, Taiwanese entrepreneur (d. 2016)
- 18 March – Chang Jen-hu, Taiwanese geographer (d. 2019)
- 28 March – Chin Kung, Chinese Buddhist monk and scholar (d. 2022)
- 19 August – Hsing Yun, Chinese Buddhist monk and teacher (d. 2023)
- 22 August – Ye Zhengda, Chinese politician and engineer (d. 2017)
- 19 December – Gao Yaojie, Chinese gynaecologist (d. 2023)
- 26 December – Lin Hu, Chinese general (d. 2018)

=== Date unknown ===
- Fan Wanzhang, Chinese fying ace (d. 1952)

== Deaths ==
- 31 March – Kang Youwei
- 28 April – Li Dazhao
- 23 May – Tang Jiyao
- 2 June – Wang Guowei
- 19 July – Zhao Shiyan
- 11 November – Wang Hebo
- 12 December – Zhang Tailei
