= Liu Yudi =

- 刘玉堤
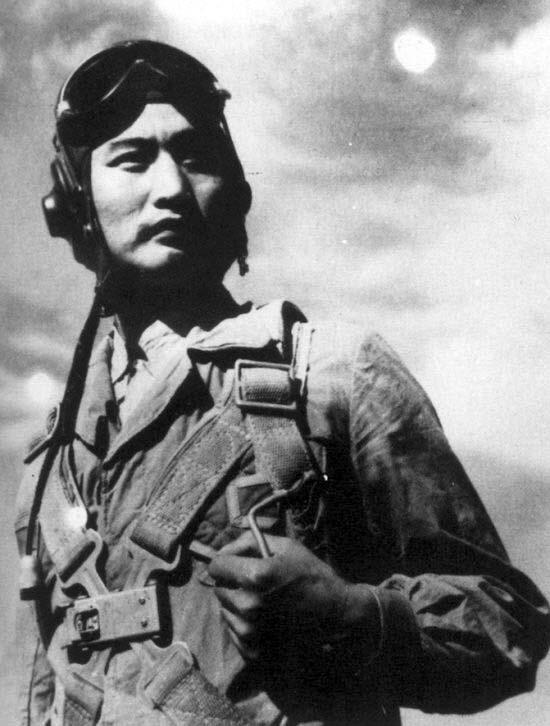
- Liu Yudi in the Korean War

Commander of the Beijing Military Region Air Force
- In office 1975–1990
- Preceded by: Li Jitai
- Succeeded by: Yao Xian

Personal details
- Born: September 17, 1923 Cang County, Hebei, China
- Died: February 17, 2015 (aged 91) Beijing, China
- Party: Chinese Communist Party
- Spouse: Jia Zhaoquan
- Children: 3
- Education: Counter-Japanese Military and Political University; Northeast Democratic Coalition Aviation School
- Nickname: Lone hero (孤胆英雄)

Military service
- Allegiance: People's Republic of China
- Branch/service: People's Liberation Army Air Force
- Years of service: 1938-1990
- Rank: Lieutenant general
- Unit: 3rd Fighter Division
- Battles/wars: Second Sino-Japanese War; Korean War
- Awards: Order of Independence and Freedom (Third Class Medal; 1963); Order of Liberation (Third Class Medal; 1963)

Chinese name
- Traditional Chinese: 劉玉堤
- Simplified Chinese: 刘玉堤
Transcriptions
Standard Mandarin
- Hanyu Pinyin: Liú Yùdī

Liu Yudi (Chinese: 刘玉堤; 17 September 1923 – 17 February 2015) was a MiG-15 pilot of the People's Liberation Army Air Force of China. According to Chinese state source Xinhua, Liu was a flying ace during the Korean War, with 6 shootdowns. He later served as commander of the Beijing Military Region Air Force, and was awarded the rank of lieutenant general in 1988.

== Biography ==
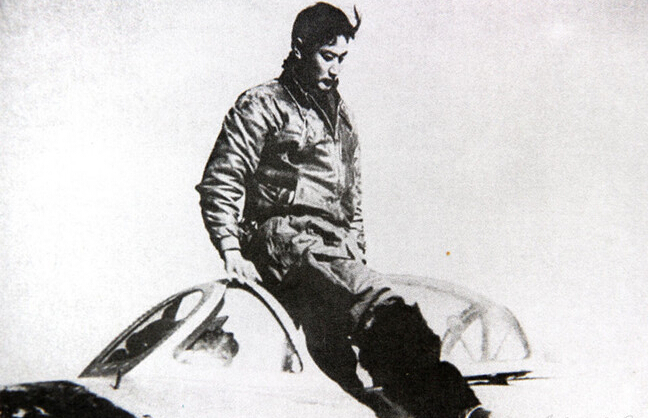
Liu was sitting on the bomber during the Korean War.

Born in Cang County, Hebei on September 17, 1923, Liu Yudi joined the Eighth Route Army in 1938, and he joined the Chinese Communist Party the following year. After graduating from Counter-Japanese Military and Political University in Yan'an, he became a squad leader in the 358th Brigade of 120th Division of Eighth Route Army. During the Second Sino-Japanese War, he participated in the 1940 Hundred Regiments Offensive led by Zhu De and Peng Dehuai in Hebei-Shanxi border. In October 1946 he was accepted to the Northeast People's Liberation Army Aviation School (a predecessor of the PLA Air Force Aviation University) and graduated in September 1948. After graduation, he became a pilot in North China Military District. In June 1950 he joined the newly created PLA Air Force 4th Mixed Brigade, working as a deputy battalion chief. During the Korean War, he flew as a member of the 3rd Fighter Division. Historian Zhang Xiaoming said Yudi shot down 4 F-84s on a single mission on November 23, 1951 but US Air Force records did not report any aircraft lost during the engagement.

After the war, he assumed various posts in PLA Air Force, including deputy commander of Beijing Military Region and commander of its Air Force. He was awarded the rank of wing commander in 1955 and the rank of group captain in 1963. He was promoted to lieutenant general in 1988. He was awarded the title of "First Class War Hero of the People's Volunteer Army".

He was a delegate to the 3rd, 4th, 6th and 7th National People's Congress, a delegate to the 11th National Congress of the Chinese Communist Party, and a member of the 7th and 8th National Committee of the Chinese People's Political Consultative Conference (CPPCC). He was also a Standing Committee member of the 7th CPPCC.

Liu retired in April 1990. He died of an illness in Beijing on 17 February 2015. The day before he died, PLA Air Force Commander Ma Xiaotian visited him in the hospital, and Liu wrote down his last words with his quivering hands: "Greatly develop bombers" (大大发展轰炸机).

== Personal life ==
Liu married Jia Zhaoquan (贾兆泉), who was a parachutist in the People's Liberation Army Air Force. The couple had two sons and a daughter. Liu had a granddaughter named Liu Jingjing (刘京晶).

== Sources ==
- Zhang, Xiao Ming (2004), Red Wings Over the Yalu: China, the Soviet Union, and the Air War in Korea, College Station, Texas: Texas A&M University Press, ISBN 1-58544-201-1

Military offices
Preceded by Li Jitai	Commander of the Beijing Military Region Air Force; 1975–1990	Succeeded by Yao Xian
