= 9th Fighter Brigade =

- 第9航空旅
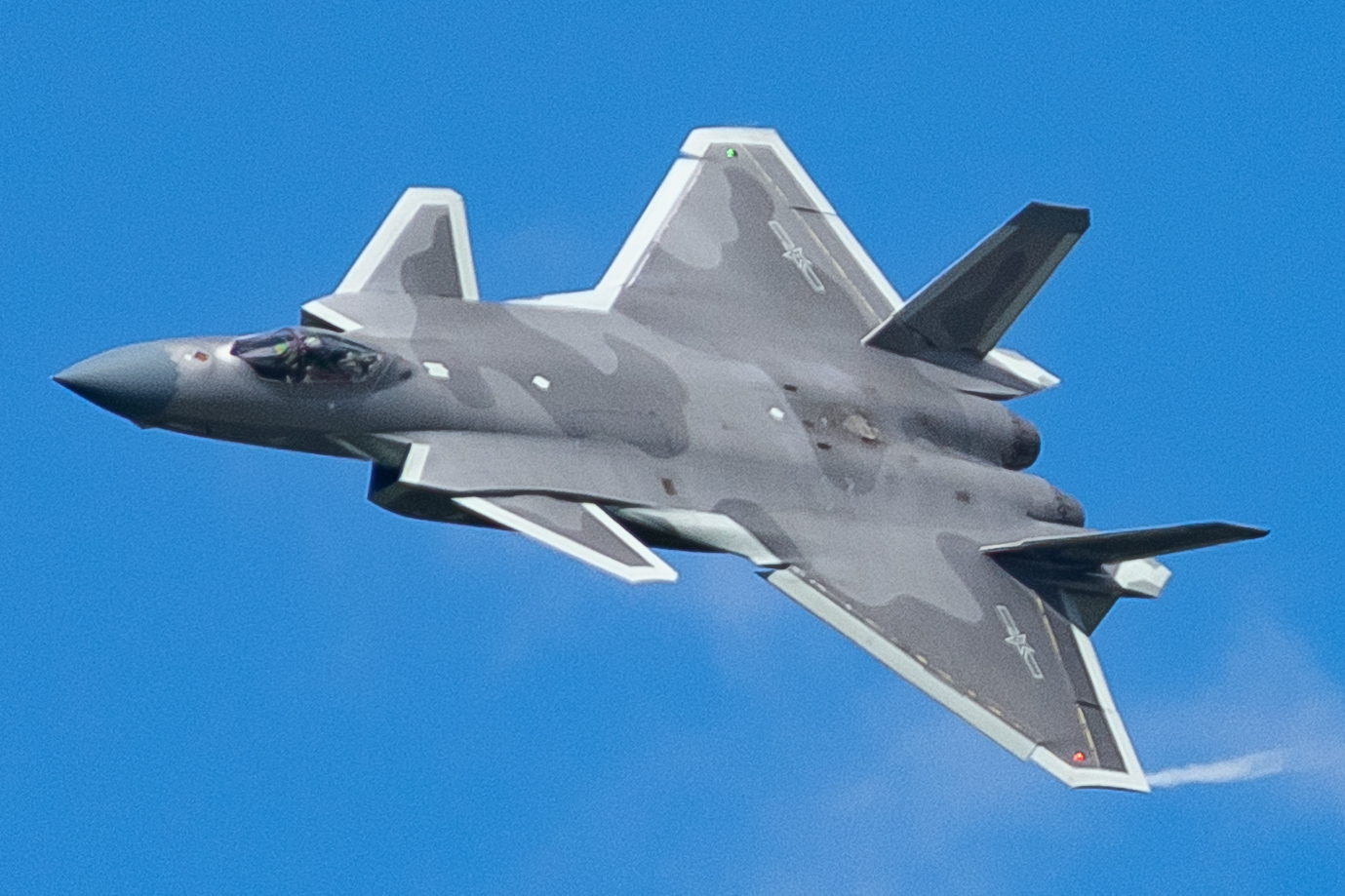
- A Chengdu J-20 similar to those of the 9th BDE
- Active: c.2017–present
- Country: People's Republic of China
- Branch: People's Liberation Army Air Force
- Type: Air brigade
- Role: Fighter
- Size: 24–30 aircraft
- Part of: Shanghai Base, Eastern Theater Command Air Force, Eastern Theater Command
- Garrison/HQ: Wuhu Air Base, Wuhu, Anhui, People’s Republic of China
- Nickname(s): "Wang Hai Brigade"

Aircraft flown
- Interceptor: Chengdu J-20

The 9th Fighter Brigade (9th BDE, Chinese: 第9航空旅; pinyin: Dì 9 hángkōng lǚ), sometimes called the 9th Air Brigade is a fighter brigade of the Chinese People's Liberation Army Air Force (PLAAF) based at Wuhu Air Base in Wuhu, Anhui province. Called "the elite of all elite divisions in the PLAAF," the unit flies the Chengdu J-20 stealth fighter as the premier fighter aviation unit in the Eastern Theater Command Air Force. Until 2017, the 9th Brigade was known as the 1st Flying Brigade of the 9th Regiment of the 3rd Fighter Air Division, at which time the division was abolished and the surviving 7th, 8th, and 9th regiments beneath it were reorganized into independent fighter brigades. Also known as the Wang Hai Brigade, the unit and its ancestors were each the first PLAAF unit to operationally employ the Chengdu J-7, Sukhoi Su-27, Sukhoi Su-30MKK, and Chengdu J-20. The brigade's MUCD is not publicly known.

== History ==
The 7th, 8th, and 9th Fighter Divisions were created between November and December 1950 upon the arrival of the third batch of fighter aircraft transferred to China by the Soviet Union to build out the PLAAF. By 1953, all divisions had three regiments beneath them.

=== 4th generation fighter unit ===
The 9th Division was the first air division in the PLAAF to operationally employ the Chengdu J-7, Su-27, Su-30MKK, and Chengdu J-20.

On June 27, 1992, the 9th Regiment received the first batch of 12 Sukhoi Su-27 fighters, 8 SK single-seat aircraft and 4 UBK two-seat trainers. On November 25, 1992, a further 12 Su-27SK single-seat fighters completed the 9th Regiment's complement, becoming China's first entirely fourth generation fighter regiment of the PLAAF.On December 20, 2000, the first batch of 10 Sukhoi Su-30MKKs joined the 9th Regiment, with a second batch of nine aircraft delivered on August 21, 2001. Upon the arrival of the Su-30's, existing Su-27s were transferred to the 19th Fighter Division of the Jinan Military Region Air Force.

== Operations ==
In January 2019 the brigade became the first operational unit to be equipped with the Chengdu J-20, replacing the Sukhoi Su-30MKK airframes it had operated since 2001. The brigade finished transitioning to entirely J-20's in the first half of 2021, fielding a fleet of between 24 and 30 of the stealth aircraft.

Tail codes for the brigade's J-20s fall within the range of 62x0x, starting with 62001.
