= Yao Xian (general) =

- 耀先
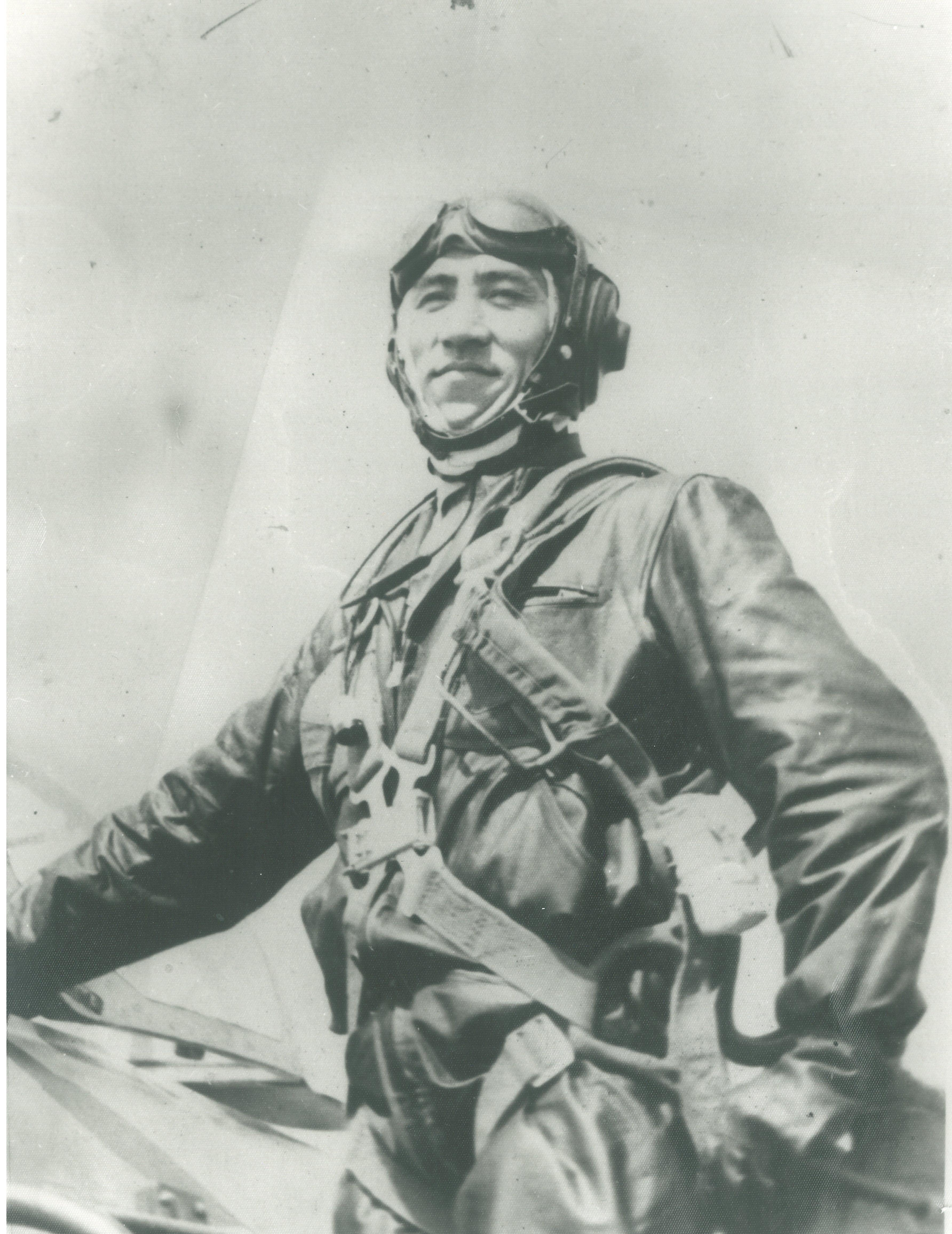
- Yao Xian during the Korean War

Commander of the Beijing Military Region Air Force
- In office 1990 – January 1993
- Preceded by: Liu Yudi
- Succeeded by: Lin Jigui

Personal details
- Born: Wei Yaoxian; 27 April 1927 Yutian County, Hebei, China
- Died: 3 March 2018 (aged 90)
- Party: Chinese Communist Party
- Spouse: Mao Yufang
- Education: Northeast People's Liberation Army Aviation School

Military service
- Allegiance: People's Republic of China
- Branch/service: People's Liberation Army Air Force
- Years of service: 1940–1993
- Rank: Lieutenant General
- Battles/wars: Second Sino-Japanese War, Korean War

Yao Xian (Chinese: 耀先; 27 April 1927 – 3 March 2018) was a Chinese fighter pilot and lieutenant general of the People's Liberation Army Air Force (PLAAF). He fought in the Second Sino-Japanese War and the Korean War, and later served as Deputy Commander of the Lanzhou Military Region Air Force and then concurrently as Commander of the Beijing Military Region Air Force and Deputy Commander of the Beijing MR.

== Early life ==
Yao Xian was born on 27 April 1927 to a peasant family in Zhuguantun Village (朱官屯), Yutian County, Hebei Province. His original name was Wei Yaoxian (魏耀先). He went to school at the age of seven, but joined the local resistance force when he was 13 after the Japanese invasion of China.

== Career ==
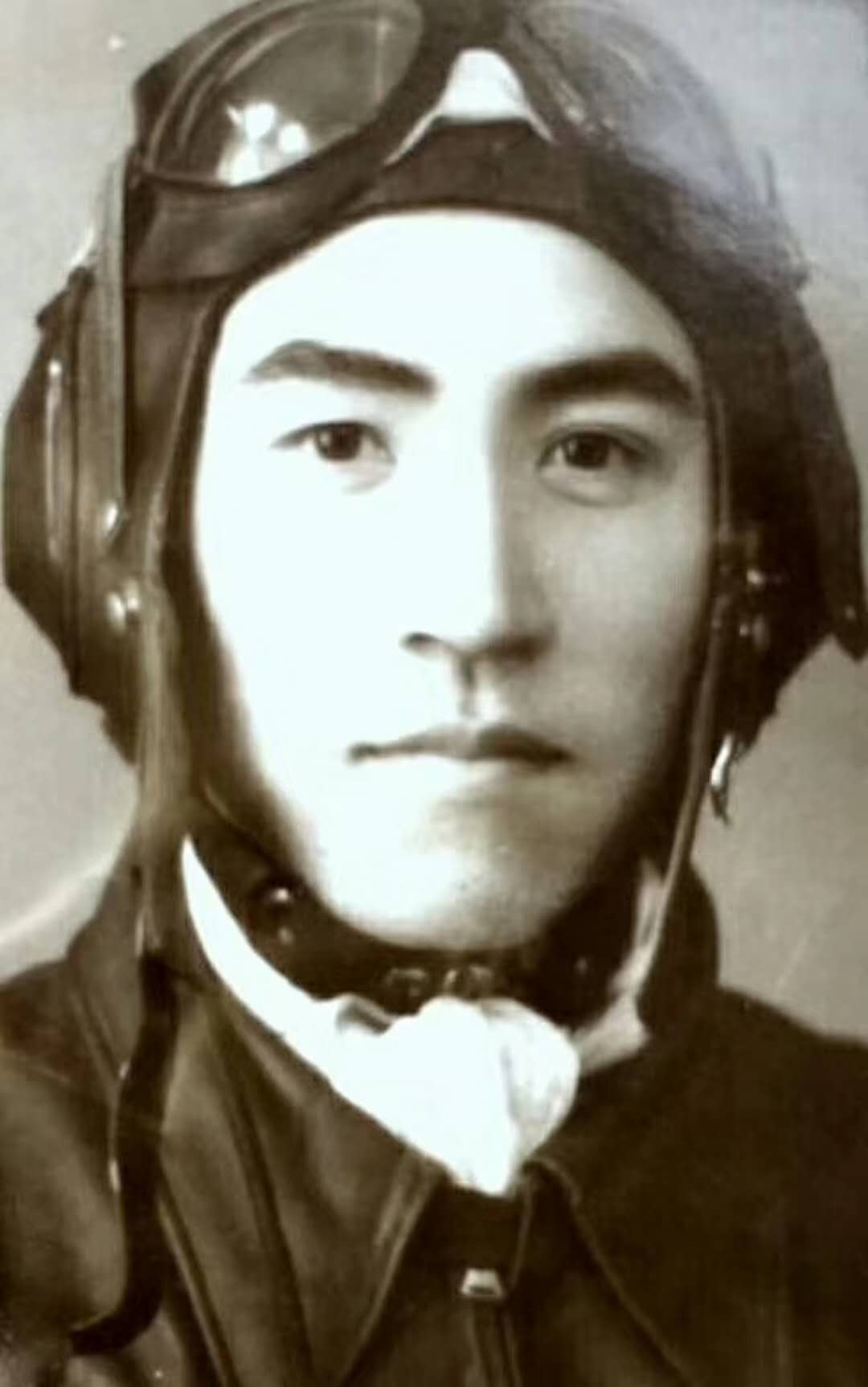
Yao Xian

He joined the Chinese Communist Party in June 1945, and was selected to undergo pilot training at the Northeast People's Liberation Army Aviation School (a predecessor of the PLA Air Force Aviation University) in April 1948. He was deployed in the newly established 7th Mixed Brigade after graduating in June 1950, just before the Korean War broke out.

In 1951, Yao's unit, the PLAAF 4th Fighter Aviation Division (reorganized from the 7th Mixed Brigade) was deployed to fight in North Korea. Yao participated in his first air battle on 2 October 1951, as a wingman of the squadron leader Zou Yan, in the airspace above Anju, South Pyongan.

He served as a deputy squadron commander, later promoted to commander. On 17 May 1953, in an air battle north of Pyongyang, Yao Xian's squadron shot down four American F-86 Sabre fighters, while losing two MiG-15s. During the war he was credited with shooting down one American F-86 jet and damaging two others, and awarded the First-Grade Merit.

After the Korean War, Yao was successively promoted to regiment commander, division commander, and deputy corps commander. In 1978, he was appointed deputy commander of the Lanzhou Military Region Air Force. He was transferred to the Beijing Military Region Air Force (MRAF) in 1987, and promoted to Commander of the Beijing MRAF and concurrently Deputy Commander of the Beijing Military Region in 1990. He was awarded the rank of lieutenant general in 1988. He retired in January 1993.

== Personal life ==
In 1956, Yao Xian married Mao Yufang (毛玉芳), a textile worker from Liaoyang, who first saw him on the cover of the Hangkong (Aviation) magazine and met him when he went to her factory to give a speech. She had already been admitted to Qingdao Textile Institute, but gave up the opportunity to attend university to marry him.

== Death ==
Yao Xian died in the morning of 3 March 2018, on the same day as his friend and colleague, fellow Korean War veteran and PLAAF lieutenant general Lin Hu. They were born in the same year and graduated from the same aviation school.
