= J-XX =

Chinese fighter aircraft program

General information
- Type: Combat aircraft
- National origin: People's Republic of China
- Designer: Chengdu Aircraft Industry Group; Shenyang Aircraft Corporation
- Primary user: People's Liberation Army Air Force

History
- First flight: Chengdu J-20: January 11, 2011; FC-31, the Shenyang J-35 prototype: 31 October 2012
- Outcome: Chengdu develops and produces the Chengdu J-20 and Shenyang develops and produces the Shenyang J-35

J-XX J-X, and XXJ are names applied by Western intelligence agencies to describe programs by the People's Republic of China to develop multiple fifth-generation fighter aircraft. General He Weirong, Chief of Staff of the People's Liberation Army Air Force (PLAAF), stated that China had several such programs underway and that an undesignated fifth-generation fighter developed jointly by Chengdu Aerospace Corporation (CAC) and Shenyang Aerospace Corporation (SAC) would be in service by 2018.

== History ==
In 1997, China began preliminary design studies of the J-XX (XXJ) program, which was reported by the United States Office of Naval Intelligence (ONI).

The PLAAF unveiled the program in late 2002. A December 2002 Jane's Defence Weekly reported that Shenyang Aerospace Corporation had been selected to head research and development of the new fighter, which was also stated in the New Scientist the same week. Also, a 2006 article in Military Technology referred to three designs; two by Shenyang Aerospace Corporation and one by Chengdu Aerospace Corporation. In 2004, both Shenyang and Chengdu Aircraft Corporation revealed their own XXJ programs. One or more of the proposed designs were believed to incorporate several design features for increasing stealth and maneuverability while decreasing weight and drag.

The Chinese state television broadcaster China Central Television (CCTV) asserts:

A V-shaped pelikan tail could be implemented, replacing conventional vertical tail fins and horizontal stabiliser structures. This would be beneficial for reduction of radar signature, weight and aerodynamic drag, since control surface area and corresponding control mechanisms are reduced. Problems faced by this type of design are flight control system complexity and control surface loading. If the pelikan tail is adopted, use of engines with thrust vector control may alleviate these problems.

[...] The new fighter may have a significantly longer fuselage than other fifth generation fighter designs, such as the F-22, for reduction of transonic and supersonic drag. A trapezoidal wing may be implemented for reduction of drag and radar signature. Use of an 's'-shaped air inlet and boundary layer separation system would greatly reduce radar signature.

According to Jane's, development of the subsystems, including an engine with thrust vectoring capability, and weapon suite for the next generation fighter had been under development. A photograph of a wind tunnel model published with the article showed a twin-engine aircraft with twin vertical tail fins. The aircraft would carry its weapons internally like the F-22 Raptor. New Scientist called attention to the angular, faceted features of the design, comparing them to the F-117 Nighthawk.

In November 2009, General He Weirong, the Deputy Commander of the People's Liberation Army Air Force confirmed research and development of the 5th generation stealth fighter, and gave a possible in-service date of 2017 to 2019.

A U.S. Defense Intelligence Agency official commenting on General He's statements indicated the DIA believes a first flight of the J-XX "will occur in the next few years". The U.S. Department of Defense expects China to have a handful of 5th generation fighters in service between 2020 and 2025, according to statements made by U.S. Secretary of Defense Robert M. Gates in July 2009. However, a year later, in May 2010, United States intelligence stated that Chinese 5th generation fighter jets will be expected around 2018. In 2011, Gates changed his position to state that China may have 50 stealth fighters by 2020 and a couple of hundred by 2025.

== Models ==
=== Chengdu J-20 ===
The Chengdu J-20 stealth fighter conducted its first flight on January 11, 2011, and entered service in 2017.

=== Shenyang J-XX/FC-31/J-35 ===
Shenyang Aerospace Corporation had a proposed J-XX aircraft that was larger than the J-20. In 2008, the PLAAF endorsed Chengdu Aerospace Corporation's proposal, Project 718 (J-20). Having lost the bid, Shenyang subsequently chose to internally develop an export oriented fighter based on its experience from its J-XX proposal, called FC-31. Shenyang FC-31 stealth fighter prototype conducted its first flight on October 31, 2012. Although initially developed without PLA commitment, the aircraft eventually received interest from the PLA Navy as a carrier aircraft, and the design evolved into the Shenyang J-35.

=== JH-XX ===
The JH-XX is a supersonic, stealth, tactical bomber/fighter-bomber aircraft under development. JH-XX is the second stealth bomber of China confirmed in existence by the U.S. intelligence community, and the Pentagon speculates the fighter-bomber is capable of long-range strike and nuclear weapons delivery.

== Further development ==
In January 2019, Dr. Wang Haifeng, chief designer of the Chengdu Aerospace Corporation (CAC) announced that China had begun pre-research on sixth-generation aircraft, predicting that the program would come to fruition by 2035. This program was tentatively named J-XD or sixth-generation J-XX by some Western analysts.

In October 2021, a fighter aircraft with a tailless design was spotted in Chengdu Aircraft Corporation facilities.

In 2018, Chengdu Aerospace Corporation reportedly submitted eight proposals for the sixth-generation fighter design, and four designs were tested in low-altitude wind tunnels. In the same year, Shenyang Aircraft Corporation (SAC) also reportedly developed prototypes for the next-generation aircraft.

=== Chengdu J-36 ===
On 26 December 2024, social media photos and videos suggested Chengdu Aircraft Corporation (CAC) has publicly flown a prototype aircraft in Chengdu, Sichuan. The Chengdu J-36 was spotted flying around an airport owned by CAC and purportedly featured a trijet, tailless, flying-wing design. It was trailed by a Chengdu J-20S twin-seater stealth fighter as the chase plane.

=== Shenyang J-XD/J-50 prototype ===
On 26 December 2024, along with the J-36, further social media posts indicated that a second airframe, featuring a cranked arrow configuration with sharply swept wings, was spotted near Shenyang Aircraft Corporation's facilities. Unconfirmed reports suggested the Shenyang fighter made its maiden flight on 20 December 2024. The Shenyang aircraft prototype seemed to be smaller than the Chengdu one. It was trailed by a Shenyang J-16 strike fighter as the chase plane. This aircraft was tentatively named Shenyang J-XD or Shenyang J-50 by analysts, but information is limited.

== See also ==
- Advanced Tactical Fighter program
- Joint Strike Fighter program
