= 3rd Fighter Aviation Division =

Defunct formation of the Chinese People's Liberation Army Air Force

The 3rd Fighter Aviation Division was a formation of the Chinese People's Liberation Army Air Force (PLAAF). Initially established in 1950. PLAAF fighter divisions generally consist of about 17,000 personnel and 70-120 aircraft. The division is currently headquartered in Wuhu Air Base, Anhui.

The 3rd Division is considered the most elite division in the PLAAF.

Until 2017, the 9th Brigade was known as the 1st Flying Brigade of the 9th Regiment of the 3rd Fighter Aviation Division, at which time the division was abolished and the surviving 7th, 8th, and 9th regiments beneath it were reorganized into independent fighter brigades. Thus the 9th Fighter Brigade was established.

== Notable members ==
- Wang Hai
- Fan Wanzhang
- Sun Shenglu
- Zhao Baotong
- Liu Yudi
- Zhang Jianping

== See also ==
- People's Liberation Army Air Force
- People's Liberation Army
- List of Chinese aircraft
- List of Airbases in the PLAAF
