= Sun Shenglu =

- Chinese: 孙生禄
- Sun Shenglu during the Korean War.
- Born: Sun Shenglu; 1928; Dingxing County, Hebei, China
- Died: December 3, 1952 (aged 23–24) near Ch'ongch'on River, North Korea
- Awards: Posthumously: Air Force Hero; First Class Combat Hero
- Aviation career
- Battles: Battle of the Ch'ongch'on River

Sun Shenglu (Chinese: 孙生禄; 1928 in Dingxing County, Hebei – December 3, 1952) was a pilot with the Chinese People's Liberation Army Air Force. During the Korean War, he was a member of the 3rd Fighter Aviation Division, The Fighter Pilot Aces List published by the United States Air Force says Sun shot down six planes. Sun was killed in action on December 3, 1952, near the Ch'ongch'on River. He posthumously received the title Combat Hero.

== See also ==
- List of Korean War flying aces
