= 8th Fighter Brigade =

- 空军航空兵第八旅
- Active: 2017–present
- Country: People's Republic of China
- Branch: People's Liberation Army Air Force
- Type: Fighter
- Part of: Eastern Theater Command
- Garrison/HQ: Changxing Air Base
- Engagements: Korean War

Aircraft flown
- Fighter: Chengdu J-20

The 8th Fighter Brigade (Chinese: 空军航空兵第八旅; pinyin: Kōngjūn Hángkōngbīng Dì Bā Lǚ) is a fighter aircraft unit of the People's Liberation Army Air Force. Previously the 8th Fighter Regiment of the 3rd Air Division, the unit serves as part of the Eastern Theater Command Air Force, responsible for conflict in the East China Sea and Taiwan Strait.

== History ==
In June 1950, sixteen months after the formation of the People's Republic of China (PRC) and seven months following the establishment of the People's Liberation Army Air Force (PLAAF), the 4th Composite Air Brigade was established in Nanjing, Jiangsu Province. Modeled on the 90th Division of the Chinese 30th Army, the new 4th Composite Air Brigade formed the subordinate 10th, 11th, and 12th Air Regiments. By the end of 1950, the unit had been renamed to the 4th Air Division and headquarters relocated to Shanghai. The PLAAF then also established the 2nd and 3rd Composite Air Brigades. The 2nd Composite Air Brigade would become the 2nd Air Division, the 3rd Composite Air Brigade would become the 3rd Air Division, and the 4th Composite Air Brigade would become the 1st Air Division.

Sixty-three pilots of the 3rd Air Division participated in the 1950–1953 Korean War claiming 3,465 sorties, 87 shoot-downs of enemy aircraft, and combat losses of 27 aircraft. Following the war's conclusion, the 3rd Air Division was moved from Shenyang in Liaoning Province to Jiaxing Air Base in Zhejiang Province to join the East China Military Region. Reflective of the division's importance, the 3rd Air Division was the first to be equipped with imported Russian Mikoyan-Gurevich MiG-21 and domestically-produced Chengdu J-7 fighters. In 1992 the 3rd Air Division was the first unit to receive Russian Sukhoi Su-27UBK aircraft (at a cost of ($1 billion) and, in 2000, received the first Sukhoi Su-30s at Wuhu Air Base. In 2006, the unit replaced its J-7 fighters with J-10 fighters.

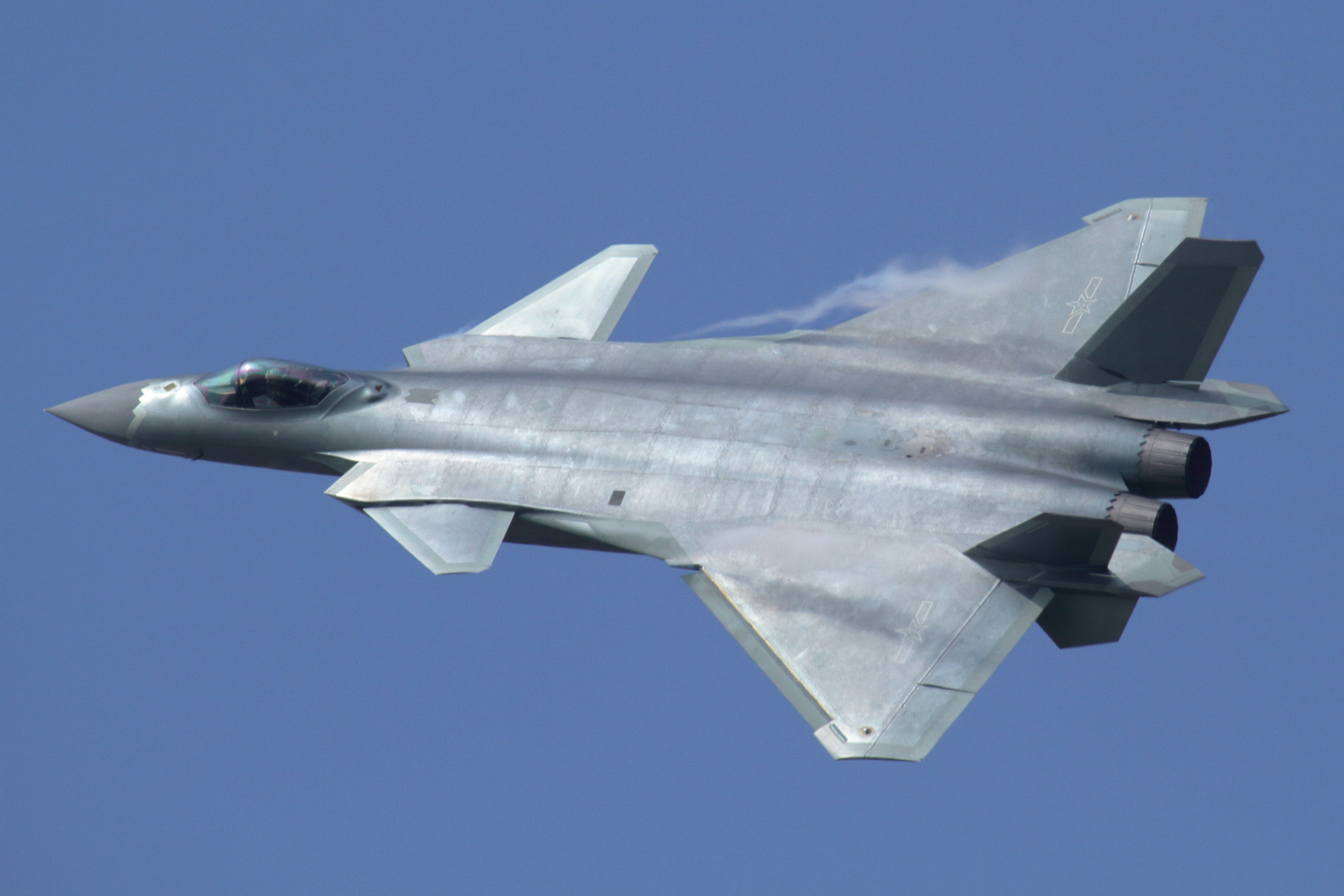
Chengdu J-20, similar to those used by the 8th Fighter Brigade

In 2017, with the PLA-wide reforms that replaced military regions with theater commands and the PLAAF reforms that disestablished divisions, the 3rd Air Division was reassigned from the Nanjing Military Region Air Force to the Eastern Theater Command Air Force and its subordinate regiments (7th, 8th, and 9th Fighter Regiments) were formed into brigades. The former 8th Regiment of the 3rd Air Division is today's 8th Fighter Brigade.

== Activities ==
Today, the 8th Fighter Brigade operates J-10A fighter aircraft, and as of mid-2022, is replacing its J-10As with Chengdu J-20s, the most modern stealth aircraft in the PLAAF inventory. Aircraft of the 8th Fighter Brigade operate out of Changxing Air Base with tail numbers 61x9x.
