= Zhao Baotong =

Zhao Baotong 赵宝桐
- Zhao Baotong during the Korean War
- Born: 1928; Fushun, Liaoning, Republic of China
- Died: December 12, 2003 (aged 74–75)
- Military career
- Allegiance: China
- Branch: People's Liberation Army Air Force
- Service years: 1950-1983
- Unit: 3rd Fighter Aviation Division
- Conflicts: Korean War

Zhao Baotong (Chinese: 赵宝桐, 1928 in Fushun, Liaoning - 2003) was a MiG-15 pilot of the People's Republic of China. He was a flying ace during the Korean War, with 9 victories.

A member of the 3rd Fighter Aviation Division, He was the first Chinese Korean War pilot to achieve ace status. Also known as Chao Bao Tun.

All Chinese aces have received the title Combat Hero in acknowledgement of their services.

== See also ==
- List of Korean War flying aces
