= Fang Ziyi =

Chinese general (1917–2015)

- 方子翼
- Born: Fang Taixing (方泰兴); 21 January 1917; Guoziyuan Township, Jinzhai County, Anhui, China
- Died: 17 March 2015 (aged 98); Beijing, China
- Military career
- Allegiance: Chinese Communist Party; People's Republic of China
- Branch: People's Liberation Army Air Force
- Service years: 1930-?
- Rank: Major general
- Commands: Deputy Commander of the Beijing Military Region Air Force; Deputy Commander of the Guangzhou Military Region Air Force
- Conflicts: Chinese Civil War (Long March); Second Sino-Japanese War; Chinese Communist Revolution; Korean War
- Awards: Order of Bayi; Order of Independence and Freedom; Order of Liberation; Red Heart Order

Fang Ziyi (Chinese: 方子翼; pinyin: Fāng Zǐyì; 21 January 1917 – 17 March 2015) was a major general in the People's Liberation Army Air Force of China. He served as Deputy Commander of the Air Force of Beijing Military Region and Deputy Commander of the Air Force of Guangzhou Military Region, and adviser of PLA Air Force Aviation University.

== Biography ==
Fang was born Fang Taixing (Chinese: 方泰兴) in Guoziyuan Township of Jinzhai County, in Anhui province, on January 21, 1917, during the Republic of China.

He joined the Chinese Workers' and Peasants' Red Army in 1930, the Communist Youth League of China in 1931, and the Chinese Communist Party in 1933. During the Chinese Civil War, he took part in the Long March. He served as a student in Flight Training Class of Xinjiang Air Force during the Second Sino-Japanese War. He served as the team leader of Eight Route Army General Headquarters Air Force, section chief of Flight Training Department, and political commissar of the Fighter Air Group in the Chinese Communist Revolution. He shot down or damaged 88 American planes with his army in the Korean War.

He was awarded the rank of Major General (shao jiang) in 1955.

He was awarded Order of Bayi, Order of Independence and Freedom, Order of Liberation, and Red Heart Order.

He served as Deputy Commander of the Air Force of Beijing Military Region and Deputy Commander of the Air Force of Guangzhou Military Region, and adviser of PLA Air Force Aviation University.

On March 17, 2015, Fang Ziyi died of an illness in Beijing.
