= Wuhu Xuanzhou Airport =

Airport serving Wuhu, Anhui, China

Wuhu Xuanzhou Airport 芜湖宣州机场
- IATA: WHA; ICAO: ZSWA

Summary
- Airport type: Public
- Serves: Wuhu and Xuancheng, Anhui, China
- Location: Wanzhi Town, Wanzhi District
- Opened: 30 April 2021; 5 years ago
- Coordinates: 31°6′16″N 118°40′2″E

Map
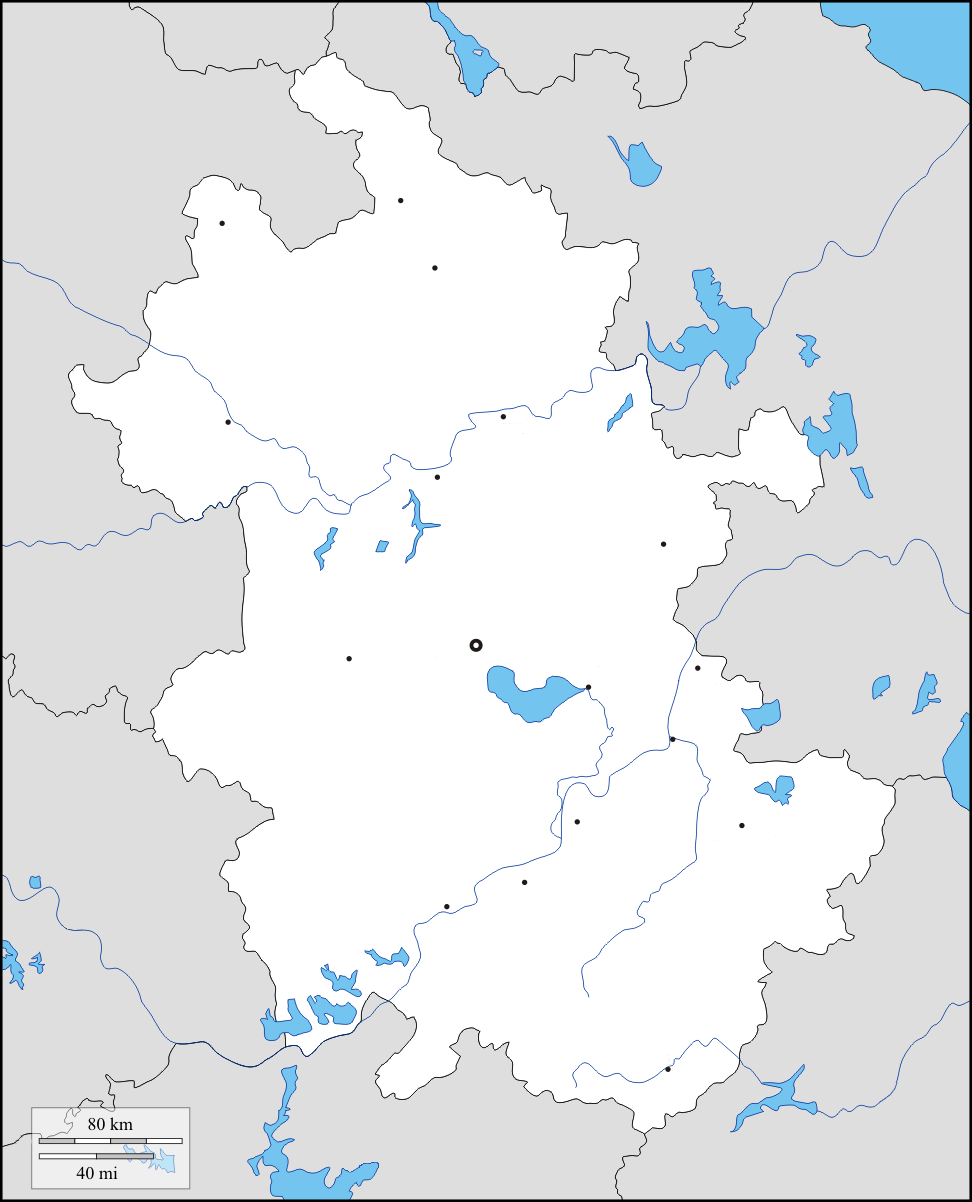
- Location of airport in Anhui

Runways
Direction	Length		Surface
Direction	m	ft	Surface
06/24	2,800	9,186

Statistics (2025)
- Passengers: 1,007,559
- Aircraft movements: 16,467
- Cargo (metric tons): 70,878.1

Wuhu Xuanzhou Airport
- Simplified Chinese: 芜湖宣州机场
- Traditional Chinese: 蕪湖宣州機場
Transcriptions
Standard Mandarin
- Hanyu Pinyin: Wúhú Xuãnzhōu Jīchǎng

Wuhu Xuanzhou Airport (IATA: WHA, ICAO: ZSWA) is an airport built to replace the commercial airline service of the old Wuhu Wanli Airport, and serves the cities of Wuhu and Xuancheng in Anhui Province, China. The airport is located in Wanzhi Town, Wanzhi District, about 48 kilometres (30 mi) from downtown Wuhu City and 30 kilometres (19 mi) from downtown Xuancheng. It began in June 2012, and it took four years to select the airport site from the original ten candidates. It received approval from the national government in 2016.

The airport opened on 30 April 2021.

== History ==
In 1934 (the 23rd year of the Republic of China), more than 20,000 laborers were conscripted to Wanli, nine kilometers northeast of Wuhu, adjacent to the Beijing-Wuhu Highway (now the Nanjing-Wuhu Highway), to build Wuhu Airport (commonly known as "Wanli Airport"). The airport at that time was very rudimentary, with a runway only 1,000 meters long, suitable only for light propeller fighter planes to take off and land.

On October 5, 1937, the Japanese army launched a surprise attack on the Wanli military airport near Wuhu, destroying more than 10 aircraft and damaging the airport. On December 10, 1937, the Japanese Air Force occupied Wuhu Airport, and the Japanese army repaired and expanded the airport.

Starting from the 1950s, Wuhu Wanli Airport was used jointly by the military and civilians. In the 1990s, Wuhu Wanli Airport operated connecting flights between Wuhu and Beijing and Foshan.

In June 2012, Wuhu City and Xuancheng City launched the Wuhu-Xuancheng Civil Airport project. The project has a total investment of 2.096 billion yuan, a flight zone rating of 4C, a runway that is 2,800 meters long and 45 meters wide, and a parallel taxiway that is 1,477 meters long and 18 meters wide. Both the main and secondary landing directions are equipped with Category I precision approach systems. The apron has a total of 11 Category C aircraft stands, and the terminal building has an area of approximately 25,000 square meters.

Construction began in October 2018, and it officially opened to traffic on April 30, 2021. Wuhu Wanli Airport ceased civil aviation operations and was converted into a purely military airport, primarily used as a military training base.

== Facilities ==
The airport has a 2,800-metre (9,200 ft) runway (class 4D), a 15,000-square-metre (160,000 sq ft) terminal building, and 8 aircraft parking aprons. It is projected to serve 1.2 million passengers and 5000 tons of cargo annually by 2025.

== Airlines and destinations ==
Airlines	Destinations
Air Guilin	Changsha, Chongqing, Dalian, Guilin, Guiyang, Haikou
China Express Airlines	Chengdu–Tianfu
China Southern Airlines	Guangzhou
China United Airlines	Foshan
Chongqing Airlines	Chongqing
Hainan Airlines	Beijing–Capital
Shenzhen Airlines	Shenzhen
Sichuan Airlines	Chengdu–Tianfu, Chongqing

== See also ==
- List of airports in China
- List of the busiest airports in China
