= Fan Wanzhang =

Fan Wanzhang during the Korean War.

Fan Wanzhang (Chinese: 范万章, 1927 in Qixia, Shandong - August 8, 1952) was a MiG-15 pilot of the People's Republic of China. He was a flying ace during the Korean War, with 8 victories.

A member of the 3rd Fighter Aviation Division, he was also known as Fan Van Chou. He was killed in action on August 8, 1952.

Like all Chinese aces, he received the title Combat Hero in acknowledgement of his service.

== See also ==
- List of Korean War flying aces
