= Wuhu Wanli Airport =

Wuhu Wanli Airport 芜湖湾里机场
- IATA: WHU; ICAO: ZSWU

Summary
- Airport type: Military
- Owner: People's Liberation Army Air Force
- Location: Wuhu, Anhui, China
- Built: 1934
- Time zone: China Standard Time (UTC+08:00)
- Coordinates: 31°23′26″N 118°24′34″E

Map
- Location of airport in China

Runways
Direction	Length		Surface
Direction	m	ft	Surface
08/26	2,400	7,874	Paved

Wuhu Wanli Airport (IATA: WHU, ICAO: ZSWU), often called Wuhu Air Base, is a Chinese People's Liberation Army Air Force (PLAAF) air base in Wuhu, Anhui Province, China.

== History ==
Wuhu Airbase was originally constructed in 1934 in response to Imperial Japanese aggressions and ambitions in the mainland of China, and was a staging location for the Republic-era Chinese Air Force to launch air strikes and combat air patrols against Japanese incursions and positions during first battles of World War II in Asia; the Battle of Shanghai, Battle of Taiyuan and the Battle of Nanjing.

== Operations ==
In 2019, the base prepared for the 9th Fighter Brigade's adoption of the Chengdu J-20 stealth fighter, constructing 26 new hangars. Wuhu Air Base also hosts PLAAF's No. 5720 factory.

== See also ==
- Wuhu Xuanzhou Airport (nearby commercial airfield)
- List of People's Liberation Army Air Force airbases
