= Air Force Aviation University =

Military university in Jilin, China

Coordinates: 43°50′34.6″N 125°19′24.3″E

People's Liberation Army Air Force Aviation University
- 中国人民解放军空军航空大学
- Logo of the Aviation University
- Former name: Northeast China Democratic United Army Aviation School
- Motto: 砺志、尚武、博学、精训
- Type: Military university
- Established: 1946; 80 years ago
- Affiliations: PLA Air Force
- President: Bai Chongming
- Academic staff: 500+
- Location: Changchun, Jilin, China
- Campus: 1,900 hectares (4,700 acres)

Chinese name
- Simplified Chinese: 中国人民解放军空军航空大学
- Traditional Chinese: 中國人民解放軍空軍航空大學
Transcriptions
Standard Mandarin
- Hanyu Pinyin: Zhōngguó Rénmín Jiěfàngjūn Kōngjūn Hángkōng Dàxué

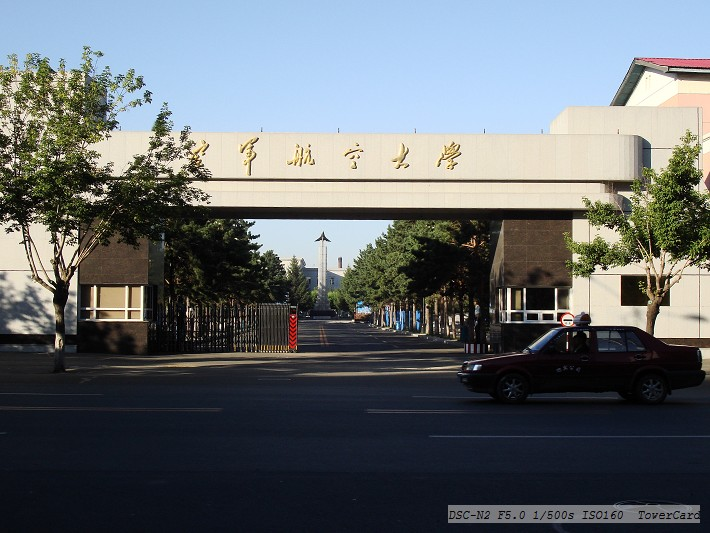
View of the front gate.

The People's Liberation Army Air Force Aviation University (Chinese: 中国人民解放军空军航空大学) is a military university in Changchun, Jilin, China.

== History ==
- AUAF was created in June 2004 through the merger of the Air Force's 2nd Aviation College, Changchun Flight College, and 7th Flight College. The three colleges were founded in Changchun in 1946 as the Northeast Old Aviation School.
- In August 2011, the Air Force 13th Flight College in Bengbu, Anhui Province was subordinated to AUAF and renamed the Flight Instructor Training Base.

== Academic structure ==
Historically, AUAF has had eight unidentified subordinate academic departments as well as an unidentified number of teaching and scientific research organizations. It has two entities dedicated to research: the Military Simulator Technology Research Institute and Flight Simulator Technology Research Center.

== Campus ==
The main campus is in Changchun but its Flight Instructor Training Base remains in Bengbu. The base is responsible for providing combined training for new flight controllers in the tower, new flight instructors, and teaching management cadre for all of the PLAAF's flight academies. It is also responsible for teaching various courses to operational aviation unit flight instructors.

== Library collections ==
The university has a collection of more than 510,000 books.

== Notable alumni ==
- Li Ming (Member of the Chinese Academy of Engineering)
- Yang Liwei
- Zhai Zhigang
- Fei Junlong
- Nie Haisheng
- Liu Boming
- Jing Haipeng
- Liu Yang
- Wang Yaping
- Yu Xu
- Tang Hongbo
- Fang Ziyi

== See also ==
- Academic institutions of the armed forces of China
