= Chase plane =

Aircraft which follows another aircraft in order to observe it up close during flight

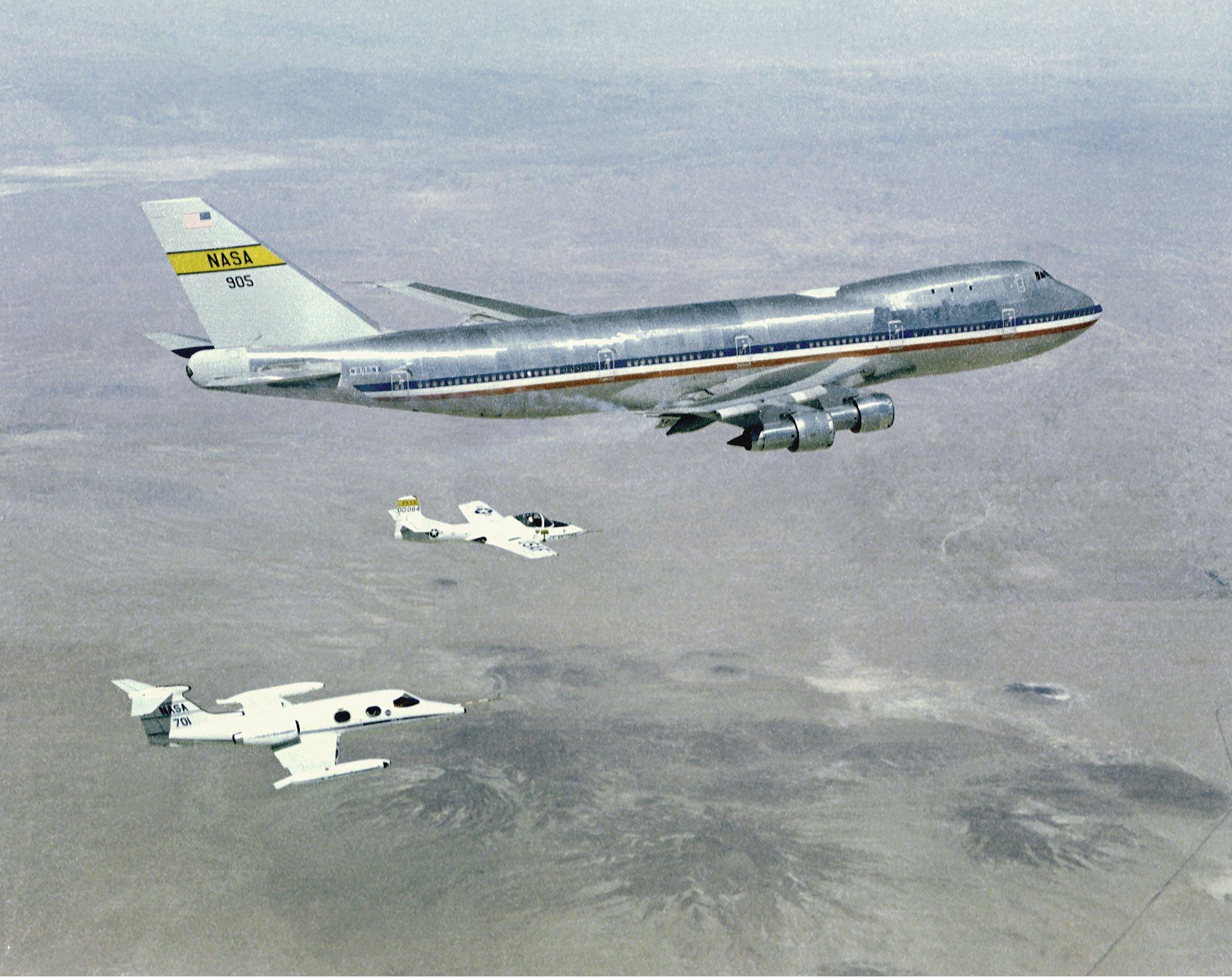
Two chase aircraft, a Learjet 23 and a Cessna T-37, in formation with a NASA Boeing 747 905 as part of a wing vortex experiment.

A chase plane is an aircraft that "chases" a "subject" aircraft, spacecraft or rocket, for the purposes of making real-time observations and taking air-to-air photographs and video of the subject vehicle during flight.

== Background ==
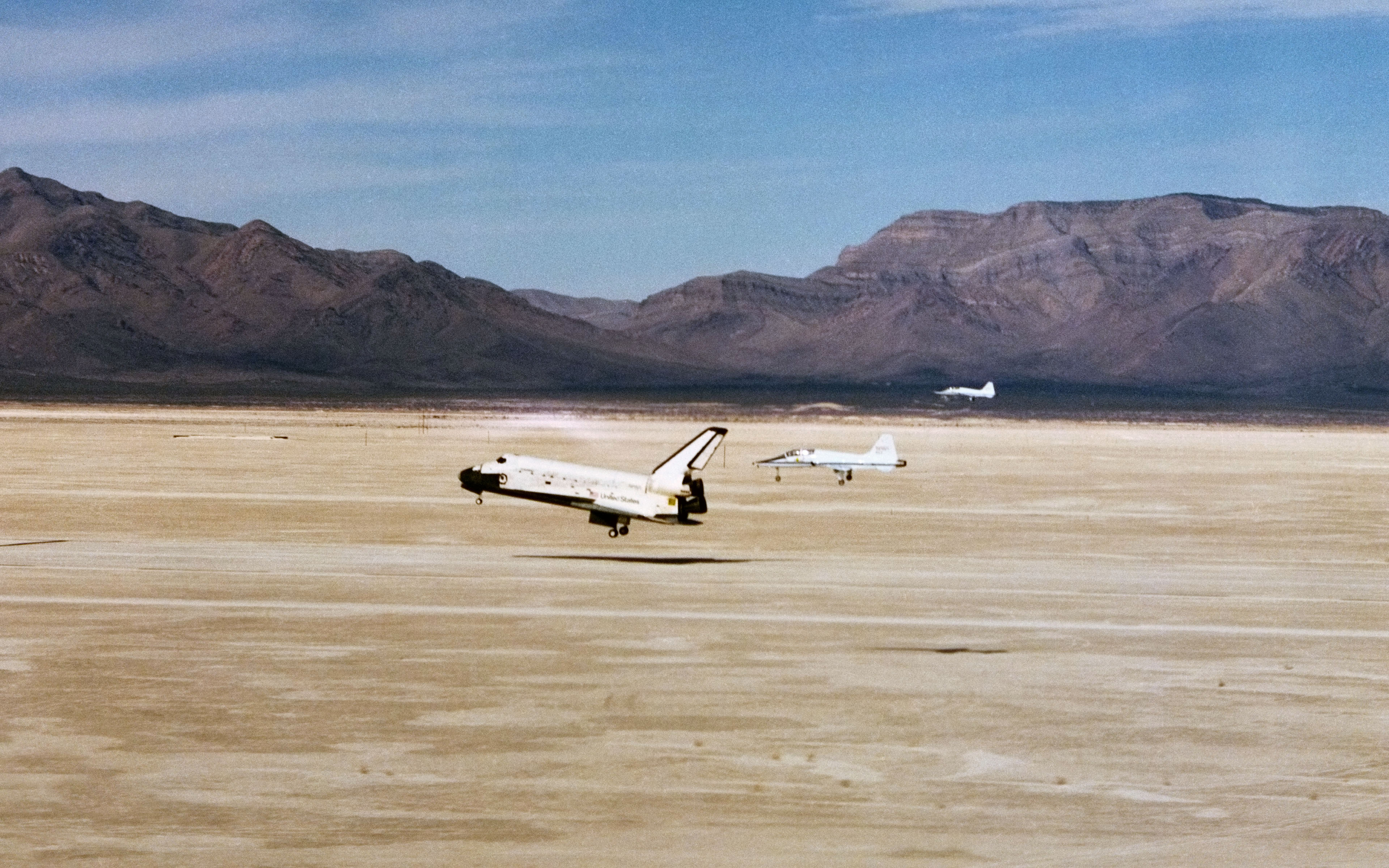
Two T-38 Talon chase planes follow Space Shuttle Columbia as it lands at Northrop Strip in White Sands, New Mexico, ending its mission STS-3.

Safety can be one function of a chase plane; others are to photograph or video the target vehicle, or to collect engineering data from it. Chase planes may be used during flight tests, and for many years the best way to ensure the safety of an experimental aircraft was to fly alongside it and observe the flight.

This "chase" airplane's crew would keep a constant lookout for problems with the "subject" or test aircraft, and if problems did arise, they would provide warnings and critical information to the test aircraft's crew, and to the mission controllers on the ground. They would also monitor the surrounding airspace for other aircraft that could pose a hazard to the flight, either by straying into their flightpath or threatening any kind of secrecy associated with that particular project.

Since the early days of United States Air Force testing, the chase aircraft have been crewed by test pilots just like the experimental planes they accompany, providing a common language and bond between test pilot and observer. The experienced pilots in the chase aircraft could guide distressed test aircraft down to safe landings should experiments go wrong.

== See also ==
- Index of aviation articles
