= List of People's Armed Police personnel killed in the line of duty =

Here is a list of all personnel (including officers, firefighters and medical staff) of the Chinese People's Armed Police killed in the line of duty, including the defunct Ministry of Public Security Active Service Forces (Guard Corps, China Fire Services and Border Defense Corps) who were PAP personnel.

The most recent LODD is Corporal Miao Jian of the Ningxia Corps, who on 2 August 2024, drowned during a rescue operation.

== Abbreviations ==
- Sgt = Sergeant
- Lt = Lieutenant
- PFC = Private First Class
- Lt Col = Lieutenant Colonel

== List ==
=== 1980s ===
Name and rank	Chinese name	End of watch	Unit	Cause of Death
Ding Zhouwen	丁周文	1983-08-18	Hubei Corps, 4th Mobile Detachment	Killed in explosion at State Reserve Bureau location at Sui County
Zhou Xuesheng	周学胜	1983-08-18	Hubei Corps, 4th Mobile Detachment	Killed in explosion at State Reserve Bureau location at Sui County
Wu Zengxing	吴增兴	1983-09-18	Jiangxi Corps, Nanchang Detachment	Killed while capturing the Wang brothers in Guangchang County
Du Yuanchao	杜远超	1983-10-10	Hubei Corps, Yichang Detachment	Killed in shooting
Hu Dalan	胡大兰	1983-12-30	Jiangxi Corps, Nanchang Detachment	Stabbed by two other PAP officers while on guard duty
Wu Derong	吴德荣	1984-01		Unknown cause (In Kaiyuan, Yunnan)
Captain Xu Yaxin	徐亚新	1984-02-26	Zhejiang Corps, 2nd Mobile Detachment	Grenade explosion during a mass shooting at Shiliping Prison in Jinhua County
Chen Yiding	陈益定	1984-02-26	Zhejiang Corps, 2nd Mobile Detachment	Killed in mass shooting at Shiliping Prison in Jinhua County
15 other unidentified personnel	N/A	1984-02-26	Zhejiang Corps, 2nd Mobile Detachment	Killed in mass shooting at Shiliping Prison in Jinhua County
Zhao Zhiqiang	赵志强	1985-05-27	Beijing Corps, 11th Mobile Detachment	Killed by falling tree
1st Lt Wen Qingxue	文庆学	1985-11-12	China Fire Services Guangdong Fire Department Guangzhou Fire Department	Struck by falling metal rod while putting out fire
Sun Yanlin	孙彦林	1986-03-22	Beijing Corps, 4th Mobile Detachment	Accidental discharge
Corporal Li Hongjun	李洪军	1986-05-20	Inner Mongolia Corps, Training team	Killed in training exercise at Baotou
Liu Wei	刘伟	1986-08	Beijing Corps, 7th Mobile Detachment	Duty-related wounds
Captain Liu Zhongyi	刘忠义	1987-08-26	Shaanxi Corps, Hanzhong Detachment	Drowned conducting rescue attempt during floods
Li Liuzhu	李留柱	1987-09-23	Beijing Corps, 11th Mobile Detachment	Traffic accident
Zhuo Yue	卓越	1987-11	Fujian Border Defense Corps, Ningde Detachment	Killed during drug interdiction operation
1st Lt Zhou Pinhua	周品华	1988	Beijing Corps, 11th Mobile Detachment	Heart attack
Li Shengjian	李生俭	1988-01-28	Beijing Corps, 11th Mobile Detachment	Struck by train while on guard duty
Sergeant Li Jianbin	李建斌	1988-06-11	Beijing Corps, 8th Mobile Detachment	Drowned
Captain Halik Abriz	哈力克·阿不力孜	1988-08-13	Xinjiang Corps, Bayingolin Detachment	Shot by suspect
Zhou Jianrong	周建荣	1989-01-02	China Fire Services Hubei Fire Department	Drowned after explosion shockwaves pushed him into a river while putting out a fire
Unidentified Sergeant	N/A	1989-03-05		Beat to death during 1987–1989 Tibetan unrest
Corporal Wu Zhendong	吴振东	1989-03-14	Liaoning Corps, Panjin Detachment	Died during wildfire
Wang Hongyan	王洪雁	1989-04-26	Tibet Corps	Died while transferring to the Shigatse Detachment
Li Guorui	李国瑞	1989-06-03	Beijing Corps, 2nd Mobile Detachment	Beat to death during Tiananmen square protests
Yan Zhenglian	闫正连	1989-08-12	China Fire Services Shandong Fire Department Qingdao Fire Department	1989 Huangdao Oil terminal explosion
Wang Xingtian	王兴田	1989-08-12	China Fire Services Shandong Fire Department Qingdao Fire Department	1989 Huangdao Oil terminal explosion
Yang Yong	杨永	1989-08-12	China Fire Services Shandong Fire Department Qingdao Fire Department	1989 Huangdao Oil terminal explosion
Wu Huailin	吴怀林	1989-08-12	China Fire Services Shandong Fire Department Qingdao Fire Department	1989 Huangdao Oil terminal explosion
Zang Chuanfu	臧传富	1989-08-12	China Fire Services Shandong Fire Department Qingdao Fire Department	1989 Huangdao Oil terminal explosion
Zhao Shouhu	赵守湖	1989-08-12	China Fire Services Shandong Fire Department Qingdao Fire Department	1989 Huangdao Oil terminal explosion
Lu Shan	卢山	1989-08-12	China Fire Services Shandong Fire Department Qingdao Fire Department	1989 Huangdao Oil terminal explosion
Zheng Shijun	郑士军	1989-08-12	China Fire Services Shandong Fire Department Qingdao Fire Department	1989 Huangdao Oil terminal explosion
Wang Bin	王彬	1989-08-12	China Fire Services Shandong Fire Department Qingdao Fire Department	1989 Huangdao Oil terminal explosion
Chen Jingfang	陈景芳	1989-08-12	China Fire Services Shandong Fire Department Qingdao Fire Department	1989 Huangdao Oil terminal explosion
Zhao Xiping	刘夕平	1989-08-12	China Fire Services Shandong Fire Department Qingdao Fire Department	1989 Huangdao Oil terminal explosion
Zhao Xingliang	赵性亮	1989-08-12	China Fire Services Shandong Fire Department Qingdao Fire Department	1989 Huangdao Oil terminal explosion
Ma Hongguang	马洪光	1989-08-12	China Fire Services Shandong Fire Department Qingdao Fire Department	1989 Huangdao Oil terminal explosion
Yang Weixing	杨卫星	1989-08-12	China Fire Services Shandong Fire Department Qingdao Fire Department	1989 Huangdao Oil terminal explosion
Cheng Junqiang	程均强	1989-11-29	Border Defense Corps Guangdong Corps Shenzhen Detachment	Crushed between two ships in failed VBSS attempt during an anti-smuggling operation in Mirs bay

=== 1990s ===
Name and rank	Chinese name	End of watch	Unit	Cause of Death
3 unidentified border defense corps policemen	N/A	1990-04-04	Border Defense Corps Xinjiang Corps, Kizilsu Detachment	Barin uprising
1 unidentified non-border defense corps policemen	N/A	1990-04-04		Barin uprising
Sergeant Wu Yong	吴勇	1990-04-05	PAP Kashgar Detachment	Stabbed during the Barin uprising
Major Xu Xinjian	许新建	1990-04-05	Border Defense Corps Xinjiang Corps, Kizilsu Detachment	Stabbed during the Barin uprising
Corporal Sun Zhenguo	孙振国	1990-06-01	Beijing Corps, 10th Mobile Detachment	Building collapse
Kong Jun	孔军	1990-06-01	Beijing Corps, 10th Mobile Detachment	Building collapse
Zhu Xiping	朱熹平	1991	Gansu Corps, Lanzhou Detachment	Attacked while on guard duty near Lanzhou–Qinghai railway
Captain Xi Kunquan	刁坤泉	1991-01-22	Border Defense Corps Guangdong Corps Shenzhen Detachment	Traffic accident
Zhao Lianshui	赵连水	1991-01-25	Beijing Corps, 3rd Mobile Detachment	Heart attack
Corporal Wang Jianjun	王建军	1991-04-11	Beijing Corps, 10th Mobile Detachment	Drowned
Zhou Xuezhong	周学忠	1991-07	Ningxia Corps	
2nd Lt Feng Qichang	冯其昌	1991-09-26	Border Defense Corps Fujian Corps, Quanzhou Detachment	Drowned after being pushed into water by drug traffickers during drug interdiction operation
1st Lt Yan Guotuan	闫国团	1991-10-05	Beijing Corps, 11th Mobile Detachment	Heart attack
Fu Yongyou	符永友	1992-01-08	Border Defense Corps Guangdong Corps 7th Mobile Detachment	Shot while apprehending suspect
Yao Bin	姚宾	1992-01-25	Beijing Corps, 3rd Mobile Detachment	Duty-related liver cancer
1st Lt Bo Haibo	卜海波	1992-02-10	Beijing Corps, 5th Mobile Detachment	Heart attack
Mei Kaichun	梅开春	1992-10-17	Border Defense Corps Guangdong Corps	Shot while on patrol
1st Lt Ma Zhongxue	马忠学	1993-03-29	China Fire Services Heilongjiang Fire Department Harbin Fire Department	Struck by truck while putting out fire
Lt. Col. Fang Chenghuan	方成宽	1993-05-27	Hubei Corps, Yichang Detachment	Traffic accident
Sergeant Zhang Yongwen	张永文	1994-03-01	Border Defense Corps Yunnan Corps	Shot by gun smugglers during police raid
Pan Qiwen	潘启文	1994-04-16	Guangdong Corps, Huizhou Detachment	Struck by a motor vehicle during an auto theft incident
Sergeant Wu Haijun	吴海军	1994-12-10	Hainan Corps, Haikou Detachment	Struck by motor vehicle while preventing it from crashing into plane at Haikou Meilan International Airport
Colonel Jiang Shikun	蒋世昆	1995-04-04	Guangdong Corps, Shantou Detachment	Electrocuted while fixing a lightning rod
Luo Linhe	罗林鹤	1995-04-12	Border Defense Corps Guangdong Corps Shenzhen Detachment	Traffic accident
Sun Dongwei	孙东伟	1995-06-27	China Fire Services Jilin Fire Department Changchun Fire Department Specialist Battalion	Killed while putting out bus station fire
Xu Xuezhen	许学镇	1995-06-27	China Fire Services Jilin Fire Department Changchun Fire Department Specialist Battalion	Killed while putting out bus station fire
Fu Keming	付克明	1995-10-10	Sichuan Corps, Logistics Office	Killed in accident while disposing of obsolete grenades
Corporal Yin Mingzhi	尹铭志	1997-08-03	Border Defense Corps Yunnan Corps, Dehong Detachment	Stabbed by drug traffickers during sting operation on China-Myanmar Border a day earlier
1st Lt Li Renqiong	李任琼	1997-08-31	120th Armed Police Division	Heart attack
Lin Haipeng	林海鹏	1997-11-07	Guangdong Corps, Zhaoqing Detachment	Traffic accident
Lt. Col. He Junsheng	贺军胜	1998-03-05	China Fire Services Shaanxi Fire Department, Xi'an Fire Department (former deputy political commissar)	1998 Xi'an explosions
2nd Lt. Bie Weitao	别渭涛	1998-03-05	China Fire Services Shaanxi Fire Department, Xi'an Fire Department	1998 Xi'an explosions
Li Haining	李海宁	1998-03-05	China Fire Services Shaanxi Fire Department, Xi'an Fire Department	1998 Xi'an explosions
Feng Ji	冯骥	1998-03-05	China Fire Services Shaanxi Fire Department, Xi'an Fire Department	1998 Xi'an explosions
Yang Xiaohong	杨小宏	1998-03-05	China Fire Services Shaanxi Fire Department, Xi'an Fire Department	1998 Xi'an explosions
Liu Junyuan	刘军元	1998-03-05	China Fire Services Shaanxi Fire Department, Xi'an Fire Department	1998 Xi'an explosions
Ma Junwu	马军武	1998-03-05	China Fire Services Shaanxi Fire Department, Xi'an Fire Department	1998 Xi'an explosions
Corporal Peng Zheng	彭正	1999	Sichuan Corps	
Corporal Li Gen	李根	1999	Hubei Corps, Enshi Detachment	Killed while on duty in Jianshi County
Sergeant Wang Hua	王华	1999-2	126th Armed Police Division	Killed while on patrol
You Zhiming	游志明	1999-07-30	Guangdong Corps, Meizhou Detachment	
1st Lt Wang Xiong	王雄	1999-11-08	Border Defense Corps Hainan Corps 2nd Coast Guard flotilla	Died at sea during patrol

=== 2000s ===
Name and rank	Chinese name	End of watch	Unit	Cause of Death
Liu Xiaohong	刘晓红	2000-05-31	2nd Hydropower Corps 7th Detachment	Killed during Yiong Tsangpo Landslide disaster relief
Zhang Zhaoying	张召营	2000-05-31	2nd Hydropower Corps 7th Detachment	Killed during Yiong Tsangpo Landslide disaster relief
Peng Minsheng	彭敏胜	2000-05-31	2nd Hydropower Corps 9th Detachment	Killed during Yiong Tsangpo Landslide disaster relief
Yang Jinfu	杨金付	2000-05-31	2nd Hydropower Corps Xiamen Command Office	Killed during Yiong Tsangpo Landslide disaster relief
Zhan Xiaohui	詹晓辉	2000-07-07	3rd Hydropower Corps 10th Detachment	Killed during Yiong Tsangpo Landslide disaster relief
Lü Xingsheng	吕兴生	2000-07-07	3rd Hydropower Corps 14th Detachment	Killed during Yiong Tsangpo Landslide disaster relief
Sun Zhanyun	孙占云	2000-07-07	3rd Hydropower Corps 14th Detachment	Killed during Yiong Tsangpo Landslide disaster relief
Private Huang Donghua	黄东华	2000-08-03	China Fire Services Zhejiang Fire Department Ningbo Fire Department	Killed by explosion while putting out boat fire
Hu Dongmin	胡冬敏	2000-12-06	Hubei Corps, Ezhou Detachment	Drowned while rescuing drowning person
1st Lt Tian Xiaolin	田晓林	2002-07-17	Transportation Corps, 2nd Corps, 4th Detachment	Drowned after falling into Parlung Tsangpo due to road collapse while providing disaster relief along National Highway 318
Sergeant Sun Jianwen	孙建文	2002-07-17	Transportation Corps, 2nd Corps, 4th Detachment	Drowned after falling into Parlung Tsangpo due to road collapse while providing disaster relief along National Highway 318
Yang Haoxue	杨浩学	2002-07-17	Transportation Corps, 2nd Corps, 4th Detachment	Drowned after falling into Parlung Tsangpo due to road collapse while providing disaster relief along National Highway 318
Li Xiaohong (Female)	李晓红	2003-04-16	Beijing Corps Hospital	SARS infection during the 2002–2004 SARS outbreak
Liu Weiyu	刘维宇	2003-05-11	Medical College of CAPF Hospital	SARS infection during the 2002–2004 SARS outbreak
Shen Hongyuan	沈宏渊	2003-05-23	Forestry Corps Heilongjiang Corps Daxing'anling Detachment	Burn injuries from wildfire in Daxing'anling
Li Caiyao	李采尧	2003-05-29	Beijing Corps Hospital	SARS infection during the 2002–2004 SARS outbreak
Zhang Xiaocheng	张晓成	2003-11-03	China Fire Services Hunan Fire Department Hengyang Fire Department	Died as Hengzhou Tower collapsed during the 2003 Hengyang fire.
Dai Hexi	戴和熙	2003-11-03	China Fire Services Hunan Fire Department Hengyang Fire Department	Died as Hengzhou Tower collapsed during the 2003 Hengyang fire.
Zhao Kanglin	赵康林	2003-11-03	China Fire Services Hunan Fire Department Hengyang Fire Department	Died as Hengzhou Tower collapsed during the 2003 Hengyang fire.
Zhong Linlin	钟林林	2003-11-03	China Fire Services Hunan Fire Department Hengyang Fire Department	Died as Hengzhou Tower collapsed during the 2003 Hengyang fire.
Chen Guihua	陈桂华	2003-11-03	China Fire Services Hunan Fire Department Hengyang Fire Department	Died as Hengzhou Tower collapsed during the 2003 Hengyang fire.
Zhang Shang	张尚	2003-11-03	China Fire Services Hunan Fire Department Hengyang Fire Department	Died as Hengzhou Tower collapsed during the 2003 Hengyang fire.
Zuo Weiping	左卫平	2003-11-03	China Fire Services Hunan Fire Department Hengyang Fire Department	Died as Hengzhou Tower collapsed during the 2003 Hengyang fire.
Guo Binghua	郭兵华	2003-11-03	China Fire Services Hunan Fire Department Hengyang Fire Department	Died as Hengzhou Tower collapsed during the 2003 Hengyang fire.
Liu Changyao	刘昌瑶	2003-11-03	China Fire Services Hunan Fire Department Hengyang Fire Department	Died as Hengzhou Tower collapsed during the 2003 Hengyang fire.
He Huadong	贺华东	2003-11-03	China Fire Services Hunan Fire Department Hengyang Fire Department	Died as Hengzhou Tower collapsed during the 2003 Hengyang fire.
Chen Xianbo	谌献波	2003-11-03	China Fire Services Hunan Fire Department Hengyang Fire Department	Died as Hengzhou Tower collapsed during the 2003 Hengyang fire.
Zeng Hui	曾辉	2003-11-03	China Fire Services Hunan Fire Department Hengyang Fire Department	Died as Hengzhou Tower collapsed during the 2003 Hengyang fire.
Liu Qingdong	刘庆东	2003-11-03	China Fire Services Hunan Fire Department Hengyang Fire Department	Died as Hengzhou Tower collapsed during the 2003 Hengyang fire.
Peng Guohui	彭国辉	2003-11-03	China Fire Services Hunan Fire Department Hengyang Fire Department	Died as Hengzhou Tower collapsed during the 2003 Hengyang fire.
Xue Xianglin	薛相林	2003-11-03	China Fire Services Hunan Fire Department Hengyang Fire Department	Died as Hengzhou Tower collapsed during the 2003 Hengyang fire.
Guo Tieniu	郭铁牛	2003-11-03	China Fire Services Hunan Fire Department Hengyang Fire Department	Died as Hengzhou Tower collapsed during the 2003 Hengyang fire.
Li Daiwei	李代伟	2003-11-03	China Fire Services Hunan Fire Department Hengyang Fire Department	Died as Hengzhou Tower collapsed during the 2003 Hengyang fire.
Zhou Zhongjun	周忠君	2003-11-03	China Fire Services Hunan Fire Department Hengyang Fire Department	Died as Hengzhou Tower collapsed during the 2003 Hengyang fire.
Zhang Hu	张虎	2003-11-03	China Fire Services Hunan Fire Department Hengyang Fire Department	Died as Hengzhou Tower collapsed during the 2003 Hengyang fire.
Nie Xuemin	聂学敏	2003-11-03	China Fire Services Hunan Fire Department Hengyang Fire Department	Died as Hengzhou Tower collapsed during the 2003 Hengyang fire.
Tan Shouwen	谭守文	2004-03-09	Jiangxi Corps, Jiujiang detachment	Wildfire in Mount Lu
Sergeant Wang Xiang	王祥	2004-04-16	Chongqing Corps	Killed in 2004 Chongqing Explosion while conducting evacuation efforts
2nd Lt Zuo Panyu	左攀渝	2004-06-14	Chongqing Corps	Killed in 2004 Chongqing Explosion while conducting evacuation efforts
Sergeant Zheng Zhonghua	郑忠华	2004-07-07	China Fire Services Fujian Fire Department, Sanming Fire Department	Drowned during disaster efforts after Typhoon Mindulle
Private Wu Yangyang	吴洋洋	2004-10	Xinjiang Corps	
PFC Li Hui	李辉	2005-02	Forestry Corps Yunnan Corps Dali Detachment	Killed while putting out wildfire
Jin Guoqing	金国庆	2005-04-27	Retired (often listed as LODD in official sources); formerly Forestry Corps, Jilin Corps	Stabbed while preventing theft in Changchun
Senior Col. Lin Yugan	林玉干	2005-10-03	Fujian Corps, Fuzhou Detachment	Drowned from floods during Typhoon Longwang
59 unidentified trainees (Ranked Officer Cadet)	N/A	2005-10-04	Officers college of People's Armed Police Fuzhou Campus	Drowned from floods during Typhoon Longwang
PFC Ai Wei	艾伟	2005-11-07	Border Defense Corps Guangdong Corps Shenzhen Detachment Ship Squadron Gongbian 44101 patrol boat	Thrown off boat and drowned after patrol boat was rammed by smuggler speedboat
Private Chen Wenzu	陈文祖	2006-02-16	Guangxi Corps, Laibin Detachment	Leukemia
PFC Lin Shoumin	林寿敏	2006-04-22	Border Defense Corps Guangdong Corps Shenzhen Detachment Ship Squadron Gongbian 44102 patrol boat	Injuries after patrol boat was rammed by smuggler speedboat
Private Wang Rongcheng	王荣成	2006-07-11	Anhui Corps, Bozhou Detachment	Drowned during flood relief
2nd Lt Liu Shisheng	刘士生	2006-09-06	China Fire Services Gansu Fire Department Longnan Fire Department	Traffic accident
2nd Lt Cheng Jiankun	程建坤	2006-09-06	China Fire Services Gansu Fire Department Longnan Fire Department	Traffic accident
Master Sgt 1st Class Li Yongkang	李永康	2006-09-06	China Fire Services Gansu Fire Department Longnan Fire Department	Traffic accident
2nd Lieutenant Gan Zurong	甘祖荣	2007-03-25	Border Defense Corps Yunnan Corps, Dehong Detachment	Shot by drug smugglers near the China-Myanmar border
Major Bai Jiangang	白建刚	2007-03-25	Border Defense Corps Yunnan Corps, Baoshan Detachment	Shot by drug smugglers near the China-Myanmar border
Captain Xu Shengqian	徐胜前	2007-03-25	Border Defense Corps Yunnan Corps, Dehong Detachment	Shot by drug smugglers near the China-Myanmar border
Master Sergeant 1st Class Tan Nian	譚念	2007-06-24	Border Defense Corps Guangdong Corps, Shunde Border Checkpoint	Drowned while saving drowning person (Off duty in Pubei County)
Master Sergeant 2nd Class Zhan Zhongyi	詹忠義	2007-09-11	Border Defense Corps Zhejiang Corps, 2nd Coast Guard Flotilla Gaibei Station	Stabbed while pursuing suspect
Master Sgt 1st Class Mai Shoukang	麦寿康	2007-11-20	China Fire Services Hainan Fire Department Qiongzhong County Fire and Rescue Battalion	Traffic accident
1st Lt Zhu Xiaolei	朱晓雷	2008-01-03	China Fire Services Xinjiang Fire Department Ürümqi Fire Department Specialist Battalion	Killed while putting out fire
Officer Cadet Zhang Yu	张宇	2008-01-03	China Fire Services Xinjiang Fire Department Ürümqi Fire Department Specialist Battalion	Killed while putting out fire
Sergeant Gao Feng	高峰	2008-01-03	China Fire Services Xinjiang Fire Department Ürümqi Fire Department Specialist Battalion	Killed while putting out fire
Corporal Lin Bin	李彬	2008-03-06	Forestry Corps, Tibet Corps, Nyingchi Detachment	Killed while putting out wildfire
Captain Tao Jie	陶杰	2008-04-13	China Fire Services Jiangxi Fire Department Pingxiang Fire Department	Killed by explosion while putting out firecracker factory fire
PFC Chen Qining	陈启宁	2008-04-13	China Fire Services Jiangxi Fire Department Pingxiang Fire Department	Killed by explosion while putting out firecracker factory fire
Wang Zhengjing	王正景	2008-08-04	Border Defense Corps Xinjiang Corps, Kashgar Detachment	2008 Kashgar attack
Wang Duqing	王都庆	2008-08-04	Border Defense Corps	2008 Kashgar attack
Wan Tiqiang	万体强	2008-08-04	Border Defense Corps Xinjiang Corps, Kashgar Detachment	2008 Kashgar attack
Li Baoquan	李保全	2008-08-04	Border Defense Corps	2008 Kashgar attack
Yang Cainian	杨才年	2008-08-04	Border Defense Corps	2008 Kashgar attack
Xu Hongjun	胥红军	2008-08-04	Border Defense Corps	2008 Kashgar attack
Liu Shenjian	刘申建	2008-08-04	Border Defense Corps	2008 Kashgar attack
Ye Wei	叶维	2008-08-04	Border Defense Corps	2008 Kashgar attack
Li Xiaowu	李晓武	2008-08-04	Border Defense Corps	2008 Kashgar attack
Han Wenfeng	韩文峰	2008-08-04	Border Defense Corps	2008 Kashgar attack
Li Haijun	李海军	2008-08-04	Border Defense Corps	2008 Kashgar attack
Sun Dongjun	孙冬军	2008-08-04	Border Defense Corps	2008 Kashgar attack
Zhai Chao	翟超	2008-08-04	Border Defense Corps	2008 Kashgar attack
Fan Bentao	范本涛	2008-08-04	Border Defense Corps	2008 Kashgar attack
Geng Haitao	耿海涛	2008-08-04	Border Defense Corps	2008 Kashgar attack
PFC Ren Ruisen	任瑞森	2008-10-08	China Fire Services Sichuan Fire Department Yibin Fire Department Specialist Company	Stung to death while removing wasp nest
Master Sgt 1st Class Du Qiu	杜丘	2008-11-06	China Fire Services Hunan Fire Department Changde Fire Department	Killed while putting out fire
Captain Zhang Jianyong	张建勇	2009-02-12	China Fire Services Beijing Fire Department Chaoyang Brigade	Killed while putting out Beijing Television Cultural Center fire
PFC Liu Anshu	刘安书	2009-02-25	Forestry Corps Yunnan Corps Dali Detachment	Crushed by falling rock while putting out wildfire (In Tengchong on China-Myanmar border)
Master Sgt 2nd Class Feng Jianguo	冯建国	2009-05-13	Ningxia Corps, Logistics Base Refueling Squad	Traffic accident in Tongxin County during 2009 Ningxia Drought disaster relief operations
Master Sgt 1st Class Dai Qiyong	代啟勇	2009-05-18	Forestry Corps, Yunnan Corps, Lijiang Detachment	Killed while putting out forest fire
Major Song Wenbo	宋文博	2009-06-14	China Fire Services Hunan Fire Department Shaoyang Fire Department	Exhaustion related Intracerebral hemorrhage during flood disaster relief(Incident date 2009-06-13)
PFC Zhou Jingshou	周景收	2009-06-26	Liaoning Corps, 1st Mobile Detachment	Drowned during rescue attempt
Corporal Fang Xin	方欣	2009-06-26	Liaoning Corps, 1st Mobile Detachment	Drowned during rescue attempt
Captain Wan Jingang	万金刚	2009-07-05	Xinjiang Corps, Ürümqi Detachment	Struck by rocks thrown from rioters during July 2009 Ürümqi riots
Private Wang Xizhi	王熙智	2009-08-02	China Fire Services Zhejiang Fire Department Shaoxing Fire Department	Died while putting out fire
Liu Cheng	刘成	2009-09-23	Border Defense Corps Guangdong Corps Shenzhen Detachment	Struck by boat propeller while rescuing drowning comrade in joint exercise with HKPF
Shen Weixiong	沈维雄	2009-09-23	Border Defense Corps Guangdong Corps Shenzhen Detachment Ship Squadron Gongbian 44104 patrol boat	Struck by boat propeller while rescuing drowning comrade in joint exercise with HKPF
Qiu Wenliang	邱闻良	2009-09-23	Border Defense Corps Guangdong Corps Shenzhen Detachment Ship Squadron Gongbian 44104 patrol boat	Struck by boat propeller while rescuing drowning comrade in joint exercise with HKPF
Corporal Hou Jieyue	侯吉跃	2009-11-01	Hebei Corps, Cangzhou detachment	Electrocuted while repairing fence of Cangnan prison

=== 2010s ===
Name and rank	Chinese name	End of watch	Unit	Cause of Death
Senior Colonel Li Qin	李钦	2010-01-12	Border Defense Corps Yunnan Corps Headquarters	2010 Haiti earthquake while a member of MINUSTAH
He Zhihong (Female)	和志虹	2010-01-12	Border Defense Corps Yunnan Corps, Kunming Checkpoint	2010 Haiti earthquake while a member of MINUSTAH
Zhong Jianqin	钟荐勤	2010-01-12	Border Defense Corps Yunnan Corps Propaganda office	2010 Haiti earthquake while a member of MINUSTAH
1st Lt Xiao You	肖忧	2010-01-26	China Fire Services Hunan Fire Department Yueyang Fire Department	Killed in explosion during firefighting
Corporal Bao Yun	鲍贇	2010-01-26	China Fire Services Hunan Fire Department Yueyang Fire Department	Killed in explosion during firefighting
Corporal Hu Chao	胡超	2010-01-26	China Fire Services Hunan Fire Department Yueyang Fire Department	Killed in explosion during firefighting
Staff Sgt Wang Licha	王利茶	2010-01-29	3rd Hydropower Corps 10th Detachment	Died saving teammate (Unspecified cause, Pangduo Hydro Power Station)
Corporal Cheng Peibin	程培斌	2010-02-12	China Fire Services Hunan Fire Department Huaihua Fire Department	Killed while putting out fire
Private Tian Lei	田磊	2010-02-12	China Fire Services Hunan Fire Department Huaihua Fire Department	Killed while putting out fire
Sergeant Ge Yuhang	葛宇航	2010-04-08	China Fire Services Shandong Fire Department Liaocheng Fire Department	Died of wounds after being struck by debris during firefighting (Incident date 2010-04-07)
PFC Zhang Yang	张杨	2010-04-19	China Fire Services Sichuan Fire Department Chengdu Fire Department 2nd Specialist Company	Killed while putting out fire
Sergeant Zhang Liang	张良	2010-07-20	China Fire Services Liaoning Fire Department Dalian Fire Department	Swept overboard during Xingang Port oil spill cleanup efforts
Yang Bo	杨波	2010-09-01	China Fire Services Henan Fire Department Anyang Fire Department	Stung to death by wasps while removing wasp nest
Sergeant Liu Chongchong	刘冲冲	2011-01-04	3rd Gold Corps, 10th Detachment	Drowned while rescuing drowned person in Erhai Lake
PFC Hua Wenxiang	华文翔	2011-02-05	China Fire Services Jiangxi Fire Department Ji'an Fire Department	Crushed by rubble while fighting fire
Corporal Zhang Xu	张旭	2011-02-10	China Fire Services Inner Mongolia Fire Department Hohhot Fire Department	Traffic accident
PFC Wu Yanjie	吴艳杰	2011-07-18	Xinjiang Corps, Hotan Detachment	Killed by molotov cocktail during 2011 Hotan attack
Private Zhang Qing	张青	2011-08-17	China Fire Services Chongqing Fire Department	Drowned while conducing search and rescue
Private Yao Yuanjun	姚元军	2011-08-22	Border Defense Corps Yunnan Corps, Dehong Detachment	Drowned in a river while fighting drug traffickers
PFC Zhang Bin	张斌	2011-09-10	China Fire Services Guizhou Fire Department Guiyang Fire Department	Fell off bridge in G60 while fighting vehicle fire
Private Liu Xiandong	刘先东	2011-09-11	China Fire Services Sichuan Fire Department Panzhihua Fire Department	Drowned in Jinsha River while preventing suicide
Private Yang Lei	杨磊	2011-09-11	China Fire Services Sichuan Fire Department Panzhihua Fire Department	Drowned in Jinsha River while preventing suicide
Major Chen Shihua	陈锡华	2011-10-22	Border Defense Corps Yunnan Corps, Baoshan Detachment	Drowned in a river while fighting drug traffickers
PFC Li Chao	李超	2012-01-01	Retired (Listed as LODD in government sources); Jiangxi Corps Ganzhou Detachment	Stabbed while preventing robbery in Fengcheng
Sergeant Sun Maohui	孙茂珲	2012-02-01	China Fire Services Jiangsu Fire Department Suzhou Fire Department 3rd Specialist Company	Inhalation of toxic fumes while putting out fire when he gave his Self-contained breathing apparatus to a teammate
7 unidentified officers	N/A	2012-02-28	N/A	2012 Yecheng attack
Captain Zheng Yilong	郑益龙	2013-03-01	Guangdong Corps, Guangzhou Detachment	Drowned in Pearl River while rescuing drowned person
1st Lt Tian Sijia	田思嘉	2012-03-10	China Fire Services Zhejiang Fire Department Shaoxing Fire Department	Killed in explosion while putting out fire
Major General Guo Yili	郭毅力	2013-07-10	Tibet Corps (former Commander in Chief)	Heart attack
Officer Cadet Chen Zhougui	陳洲貴	2013-07-31	Officers college of People's Armed Police	Drowned while rescuing drowned person (Off duty in Dongshan County)
Colonel Jia Baolong	贾宝龙	2013-08-15	Forestry Corps Mobile Detachment (Former deputy Detachment commander)	Fighting wildfires in Lengshuijiang
Sergeant Zhang Chi	张池	2013-08-16	Jilin Corps, Baishan Detachment	Drowned during disaster relief after 2013 Northeastern China floods
Major Liu Hongkun	刘洪坤	2013-10-11	China Fire Services Beijing Fire Department Shijingshan Brigade (Former chief of staff)	Crushed by debris while putting out fire
1st Lt Liu Hongkui	刘洪魁	2013-10-11	China Fire Services Beijing Fire Department Shijingshan Brigade	Crushed by debris while putting out fire
PFC Qian Lingyun	钱凌云	2014-05-01	China Fire Services Shanghai Fire Department Xuhui Brigade	Fell off 13th floor of building while putting out fire
PFC Liu Jie	刘杰	2014-05-01	China Fire Services Shanghai Fire Department Xuhui Brigade	Fell off 13th floor of building while putting out fire
Sergeant Xie Qiao	谢樵	2014-08-03	Border Defense Corps Yunnan Corps Hospital	Rockslide from aftershocks of 2014 Ludian earthquake during relief operations
Tan Jinhu	谭金虎	2014-08-21	Gansu Corps, Qingyang Detachment	Struck by vehicle that overran a checkpoint
Major Dou Junning	豆军宁	2014-08-21	Gansu Corps, Qingyang Detachment	Struck by vehicle that overran a checkpoint
1st Lt Li Zhengsong	李正松	2015-01-02	Border Defense Corps Yunnan Corps	Traffic accident
Corporal Fu Renchao	傅仁超	2015-01-02	China Fire Services Heilongjiang Fire Department, Harbin Fire Department	Struck by debris while putting out 2015 Harbin Warehouse Fire
Corporal Hou Baosen	侯宝森	2015-01-02	China Fire Services Heilongjiang Fire Department, Harbin Fire Department HAZMAT Company	Crushed by building collapse while putting out 2015 Harbin Warehouse Fire
Corporal Yang Xiaowei	杨小伟	2015-01-02	China Fire Services Heilongjiang Fire Department, Harbin Fire Department HAZMAT Company	Crushed by building collapse while putting out 2015 Harbin Warehouse Fire
Corporal Zhang Xiaokai	张晓凯	2015-01-02	China Fire Services Heilongjiang Fire Department, Harbin Fire Department	Struck by debris while putting out 2015 Harbin Warehouse Fire
Private Zhao Zilong	赵子龙	2015-01-02	China Fire Services Heilongjiang Fire Department, Harbin Fire Department	Struck by debris while putting out 2015 Harbin Warehouse Fire
Captain Yao Kexian	姚克显	2015-01-04	China Fire Services Henan Fire Department, Nanyang Fire Department	Heart attack
Lt. Col. Huang Pengyou	黄澎友	2015-01-05	China Fire Services	Heart attack
Major Zhao Bo	赵波	2015-01-27	China Fire Services Shaanxi Fire Department, Xi'an Fire Department	Heart attack
1st Lt Xu Hua	徐骅	2015-01-31	Forestry Corps, Sichuan Corps, Garzê Detachment	Traffic accident while returning from a wildfire
Captain Dai Baohe	戴保河	2015-02-02	China Fire Services Hebei Fire Department Tangshan Fire Department	Traffic accident
Captain Liu Chang	刘畅	2015-02-15	China Fire Services Hubei Fire Department Yichang Fire Department	Heart attack
Sergeant Wang Cairen	王才韧	2015-02-21	Border Defense Corps Hainan Corps, Danzhou Detachment	Automobile accident while conducting VIP transport
1st Lt Ji Jiaqiang	纪加强	2015-02-23	China Fire Services Fujian Fire Department, Ningde Fire Department	Crushed by falling house while putting out fire
Corporal Hu Sirong	胡思荣	2015-03-03	Border Defense Corps Shigatse Detachment	Fell from tower in Wubuqi Checkpoint
Sergeant Gao Bohua	高波华	2015-03-20	China Fire Services Liaoning Fire Department Yingkou Fire Department	Killed in explosion while putting out fire
1st Lt Liu Linlin	刘林林	2015-04-04	China Fire Services Henan Fire Department Xuchang Fire Department	Traffic accident
Corporal Yuan Shimin	袁世民	2015-04-04	China Fire Services Henan Fire Department Xuchang Fire Department	Traffic accident
1st Lt Li Ronggang	李荣刚	2015-04-08	China Fire Services Liaoning Fire Department Benxi Fire Department	Heart attack
Private Zhang Lei	张雷	2015-04-09	Border Defense Corps Hebei Corps	Fell from tower in Huanghua checkpoint
2nd Lt Ding Yongli	丁永利	2015-04-16	China Fire Services Inner Mongolia Fire Department Baotou Fire Department	Traffic accident
PFC Cheng Luxin	程鹿鑫	2015-04-20	China Fire Services Shanxi Fire Department Linfen Fire Department	Traffic accident
Captain Tian Yao	田瑶	2015-04-24	China Fire Services Hebei Fire Department Baoding Fire Department	Fell from training tower
Staff Sgt Wang Xiaodong	王小冬	2015-05-02	Border Defense Corps Liaoning Corps Dandong Detachment	Heart attack
Lt. Col. Kang Chunsheng	康春生	2015-05-12	Border Defense Corps Tibet Corps Mobile Detachment	Altitude Sickness
Captain Cha Zhaoyun	茶照云	2015-05-23	Border Defense Corps Nujiang Detachment	Drove into river and drowned while avoiding other vehicles
1st Lt Yang Kezhang	杨科璋	2015-05-29	China Fire Services Guangxi Fire Department, Yulin Fire Department	Fell into elevator shaft while rescuing girl from fire
Lt. Col. Ge Jiajun	葛佳军	2015-06-08	China Fire Services Hunan Fire Department	Heart attack
Lt. Col. Zhang Xuefeng	张雪峰	2015-06-12	Border Defense Corps Tibet Corps Logistics Office	Heart attack
Private Zhang Tianqi	张天启	2015-06-13	China Fire Services	Fell from building
Private Ge Shao	葛兆	2015-06-16	Border Defense Corps Xinjiang Corps Mobile Detachment	Heart attack
Colonel Wang Jianjun	王建军	2015-06-23	Guard Corps, Beijing Corps	Heart attack
Major Yang Jianquan	杨建全	2015-06-24	Border Defense Corps Yunnan Corps, Baoshan Detachment	Traffic accident
Captain Zhu Guo'an	朱国安	2015-06-28	Border Defense Corps Guangxi Corps, Fangchenggang detachment	Heart attack
Captain Li Li	李理	2015-06-29	Guard Corps, Qinghai Corps	Rhabdomyolysis during training exercise in Inner Mongolia
Captain Duan Jilu	段继禄	2015-06-30	Border Defense Corps Shandong Corps, Weihai Detachment	Heart attack
Sergeant Yu Guangen	于广恩	2015-07-19	China Fire Services Jiangsu Fire Department, Nanjing Fire Department	Syncope while on duty
Staff Sergeant zh-yue	张楠	2015-07-26	Shandong Corps, Linyi Detachment	Jazeera Palace Hotel bombing while guarding Chinese embassy in Somalia
1st Lt Li Qun	李群	2015-07-31	Border Defense Corps Heilongjiang Corps, Mudanjiang Detachment	Heart attack
Sergeant Hua Fenglei	华逢磊	2015-08-06	China Fire Services Yunnan Fire Department, Kunming Fire Department	Traffic accident
Corporal Cheng Yuan	成圆	2015-08-12	China Fire Services Tianjin Fire Department Economic-Technological Development Area brigade	2015 Tianjin explosions (Casualties of the 2015 Tianjin explosions)
Private Chen Bowen	陈博文	2015-08-12	China Fire Services Tianjin Fire Department Economic-Technological Development Area brigade, Specialist Company	2015 Tianjin explosions (Casualties of the 2015 Tianjin explosions)
Private Cai Jiayuan	蔡家远	2015-08-12	China Fire Services Tianjin Fire Department Economic-Technological Development Area brigade	2015 Tianjin explosions (Casualties of the 2015 Tianjin explosions)
Corporal Gao Hongsen	高洪森	2015-08-12	China Fire Services Tianjin Fire Department Economic-Technological Development Area brigade, Specialist Company	2015 Tianjin explosions (Casualties of the 2015 Tianjin explosions)
PFC Guo Junyao	郭俊瑶	2015-08-12	China Fire Services Tianjin Fire Department Economic-Technological Development Area Brigade	2015 Tianjin explosions (Casualties of the 2015 Tianjin explosions)
Major Jiang Zeguo	江泽国	2015-08-12	China Fire Services Tianjin Fire Department Economic-Technological Development Area Brigade	2015 Tianjin explosions (Casualties of the 2015 Tianjin explosions)
1st Lt Li Hongxi	李洪喜	2015-08-12	China Fire Services Tianjin Fire Department Economic-Technological Development Area Brigade	2015 Tianjin explosions (Casualties of the 2015 Tianjin explosions)
PFC Li Yuanhang	李远航	2015-08-12	China Fire Services Tianjin Fire Department Economic-Technological Development Area brigade, Specialist Company	2015 Tianjin explosions (Casualties of the 2015 Tianjin explosions)
1st Lt Liang Shilei	梁仕磊	2015-08-12	China Fire Services Tianjin Fire Department Economic-Technological Development Area brigade	2015 Tianjin explosions (Casualties of the 2015 Tianjin explosions)
Staff Sgt Lin Haiming	林海明	2015-08-12	China Fire Services Tianjin Fire Department Economic-Technological Development Area brigade, Specialist Company	2015 Tianjin explosions (Casualties of the 2015 Tianjin explosions)
Sergeant Liu Cheng	刘程	2015-08-12	China Fire Services Tianjin Fire Department Economic-Technological Development Area brigade	2015 Tianjin explosions (Casualties of the 2015 Tianjin explosions)
Private Ning Yu	宁宇	2015-08-12	China Fire Services Tianjin Fire Department Dongjiang Port Area Brigade	2015 Tianjin explosions (Casualties of the 2015 Tianjin explosions)
PFC Ning Zimo	宁子默	2015-08-12	China Fire Services Tianjin Fire Department Economic-Technological Development Area brigade, Specialist Company	2015 Tianjin explosions (Casualties of the 2015 Tianjin explosions)
Corporal Pang Ti	庞题	2015-08-12	China Fire Services Tianjin Fire Department Dongjiang Port Area brigade	2015 Tianjin explosions (Casualties of the 2015 Tianjin explosions)
Staff Sgt Shao Junqiang	邵俊强	2015-08-12	China Fire Services Tianjin Fire Department Economic-Technological Development Area brigade Taihu Road Company Specialist Squad (former squad leader)	2015 Tianjin explosions (Casualties of the 2015 Tianjin explosions)
2nd Lt Tang Ziyi	唐子懿	2015-08-12	China Fire Services Tianjin Fire Department Dongjiang Port Area brigade	2015 Tianjin explosions (Casualties of the 2015 Tianjin explosions)
Staff Sgt Tian Baojian	田宝健	2015-08-12	China Fire Services Tianjin Fire Department Dongjiang Port Area brigade	2015 Tianjin explosions (Casualties of the 2015 Tianjin explosions)
Lt Col Wang Jiliang	王吉良	2015-08-12	China Fire Services Tianjin Fire Department Economic-Technological Development Area brigade (Former Deputy fire chief)	2015 Tianjin explosions (Casualties of the 2015 Tianjin explosions)
Sergeant Wang Qi	王琪	2015-08-12	China Fire Services Tianjin Fire Department Dongjiang Port Area Brigade	2015 Tianjin explosions (Casualties of the 2015 Tianjin explosions)
Corporal Yang Gang	杨钢	2015-08-12	China Fire Services Tianjin Fire Department Economic-Technological Development Area brigade	2015 Tianjin explosions (Casualties of the 2015 Tianjin explosions)
Sergeant Yin Yanrong	尹艳荣	2015-08-12	China Fire Services Tianjin Fire Department Economic-Technological Development Area brigade, Specialist Company	2015 Tianjin explosions (Casualties of the 2015 Tianjin explosions)
Private Yuan Hai	袁海	2015-08-12	China Fire Services Tianjin Fire Department Dongjiang Port Area Brigade	2015 Tianjin explosions (Casualties of the 2015 Tianjin explosions)
Corporal Zhen Yuhang	甄宇航	2015-08-12	China Fire Services Tianjin Fire Department Economic-Technological Development Area brigade	2015 Tianjin explosions (Casualties of the 2015 Tianjin explosions)
PFC Zi Qinghai	訾青海	2015-08-12	China Fire Services Tianjin Fire Department Economic-Technological Development Area brigade	2015 Tianjin explosions (Casualties of the 2015 Tianjin explosions)
Major Zhang Liang	张亮	2015-08-15	China Fire Services Shanxi Fire Department Taiyuan Fire Department	Heart attack
1st Lt Ding Qingjia	丁庆佳	2015-08-18	China Fire Services Heilongjiang Fire Department Mudanjiang Fire Department	Traffic accident
1st Lt Cai Yi	蔡漪	2015-08-21	China Fire Services Hubei Fire Department Suizhou Fire Department	Heart attack
Major Du Mingsheng	杜明胜	2015-09-08	China Fire Services Sichuan Fire Department Mianyang Fire Department	Intracerebral hemorrhage
Corporal Sonam Kubei	索朗曲培	2015-09-17	Border Defense Corps Tibet Corps Ngari Detachment	Landslide while on patrol
Corporal Yan Chong	颜宠	2015-09-21	Border Defense Corps Jilin Corps, Baishan Detachment	Traffic accident
PFC Wang Lei	王磊	2015-09-24	Border Defense Corps Tibet Corps, Shigatse Detachment	Fell off cliff while conducting search and rescue operation
Lt. Col. Li Junquan	李均全	2015-09-25	Border Defense Corps Yunnan Corps	Electrocuted while repairing China-Myanmar border wall
Corporal Ge Runjun	葛润俊	2015-10-03	China Fire Services Jiangxi Fire Department Nanchang Fire Department	Drowned while rescuing drowned person while off duty in Suichuan County
Sergeant Yuan Kangkang	袁康康	2015-10-11	Border Defense Corps Fujian Corps, Zhangzhou Detachment	Drowned while repairing patrol boat
Corporal Lei Hongchun	雷洪春	2015-10-13	China Fire Services Sichuan Fire Department Chengdu Detachment	Vehicle accident
PFC Cao Zhuangzhuang	曹壮壮	2015-10-19	China Fire Services Ningxia Fire Department Zhongwei Fire Department	Syncope during training exercise
PFC Wang Wanfu	王万福	2015-12-31	China Fire Services Qinghai Fire Department Yushu Fire Department Yushu Battalion Specialist Company	Heart attack
Senior Col. Ceng Jie	曾杰	2016-01-21	China Fire Services Shanghai Fire Department	Heart attack
2nd Lt Liu Jie	刘杰	2016-01-24	China Fire Services Chongqing Fire Department Qijiang district brigade	Automobile accident
Sergeant Fu Qiang	付强	2016-02-03	China Fire Services Yunnan Fire Department Wenshan Fire Department	Automobile accident
Corporal Chen Jian	陈健	2016-02-05	China Fire Services Guizhou Fire Department Guian New Area Fire Department	Killed in bomb disposal accident at abandoned fireworks factory
PFC Liang Lei	梁镭	2016-02-05	China Fire Services Guizhou Fire Department Guian New Area Fire Department	Killed in bomb disposal accident at abandoned fireworks factory
Sergeant Pan Chenghua	潘成华	2016-02-05	China Fire Services Guizhou Fire Department Guian New Area Fire Department	Killed in bomb disposal accident at abandoned fireworks factory
Corporal Tian Minghang	田明杭	2016-02-05	China Fire Services Guizhou Fire Department Guian New Area Fire Department	Killed in bomb disposal accident at abandoned fireworks factory
PFC Wang Zhongliang	王仲良	2016-02-05	China Fire Services Guizhou Fire Department Guian New Area Fire Department	Killed in bomb disposal accident at abandoned fireworks factory
Corporal Yang Zhetao	杨哲涛	2016-03-05	China Fire Services Shandong Fire Department Jinan Fire Department	Heart attack
Lieutenant Colonel Yang Jungang	杨军刚	2016-03-07	Border Defense Corps Yunnan Corps, Pu'er Detachment	Shot by drug traffickers near the China–Laos border
Major Li Xiaochun	李晓春	2016-03-29	Border Defense Corps Guangdong Corps, Mobile Battalion	Heart attack
Major Li Jianli	李建利	2016-03-29	Border Defense Corps Jiangxi Fire Department Ji'an Fire Department	Heart attack
Private Zhang Heng	张恒	2016-03-30	China Fire Services Hubei Fire Department, Wuhan Fire Department	Heart attack in training exercise
Corporal Peng Xuerui	彭学瑞	2016-04-04	Border Defense Corps Yunnan Corps, Nujiang Detachment	Drove into the Salween River and drowned
Corporal Cao Xiaoqi	曹晓琪	2016-04-19	China Fire Services Shanxi Fire Department Taiyuan Fire Department	Fell from building
Corporal Wang Shuwen	黄叔文	2016-04-20	Border Defense Corps Yunnan Corps, Kunming Detachment	Fell off roof during building repairs
Sergeant Zhu Junjun	朱军军	2016-04-22	China Fire Services Jiangsu Fire Department Taizhou Fire Department	Killed while putting out 2016 Jingjiang chemical warehouse fire
1st Lt Zhang Dehou	张得厚	2016-04-23	China Fire Services Shanxi Fire Department Xinzhou Fire Department	Automobile accident
Master Sgt 4th Class Sun Wenpu	孙文璞	2016-05-04	China Fire Services Hebei Fire Department	Heart attack
Lt. Col. Ge Zhangping	葛张平	2016-05-19	Border Defense Corps Shandong Corps, Yantai Detachment	Heart attack
PFC Li Dongchang	李东昌	2016-05-22	Border Defense Corps Jilin Corps, Mobile Detachment	Automobile accident
Lt Col. Liang Liang	梁亮	2016-05-23	China Fire Services Shaanxi Fire Department, Xianyang brigade	Heart attack
Major Chen Shuai	陈帅	2016-05-31	China Fire Services Jiangsu Fire Department, Nantong Fire Department	Killed in explosion while evacuating people from fire
Major Niu Zhouqiang	牛州强	2016-06-05	China Fire Services Gansu Fire Department Lanzhou New Area Fire Department	Automobile accident
Master Sgt 4th Class Zhang Zhongliang	张忠亮	2016-06-05	China Fire Services Jilin Fire Department Tonghua Fire Department	Automobile accident
Xie Jingzhong	谢靖忠	2016-06-11	Retired (often officially reported as a line of duty incident)	Drowned while rescuing 3 drowning victims in Chaozhou
1st Lt Yu Qianliu	于千柳	2016-06-27	China Fire Services Inner Mongolia Fire Department Chifeng Fire Department	Heart attack
Corporal Gu Zongkun	顾宗坤	2016-07-05	Border Defense Corps Heilongjiang Corps, Suifenhe Checkpoint Surveillance Company	Accidentally shot
Officer Cadet Liu Sitong	刘思桐	2016-07-09	Border Defnese Corps Tibet Corps Intel Detachment	Altitude sickness
Staff Sgt Ceng Fei	曾飞	2016-07-11	Border Defense Corps, Tibet Corps, Shigatse Detachment	Vehicle fell into Bhotekoshi River
PFC Qiao Gang	乔刚	2016-07-11	China Fire Services Officer training base (Tianjin)	Fell from training tower
Corporal Liu Zhihong	刘质宏	2016-07-21	Transport corps, 2nd Transport Corps, 4th Detachment	Altitude sickness during avalanche disaster relief operations in Rutog County
Captain Sun Yabin	孙雅彬	2016-07-22	Border Defense Corps Tianjin Corps, Binhai Detachment	Drowned responding to a shipwrecking
Private Zhang Yu	张雨	2016-07-31	Border Defense Corps Inner Mongolia Corps, Logistics Base	Heart attack
Private Zhao Zhikun	赵志坤	2016-08-05	Border Defense Corps Jiangsu Corps	Cerebrovascular disease
Captain Zhang Fushan	张富善	2016-08-17	China Fire Services Beijing Fire Department Chaoyang District Brigade	Syncope while inspecting fire station
Sergeant Zhang Jian	张健	2016-08-17	China Fire Services Jilin Fire Department Siping Fire Department	Traffic accident
Sergeant Ouyang Wenjian	欧阳文建	2016-08-18	Border Defense Corps Hainan Corps, Lingao Detachment	Drowned in Tropical Storm Dianmu during rescue efforts
PFC Liu Lang	刘浪	2016-08-31	China Fire Services Chongqing Fire Department, Wanzhou District Brigade	Heart attack
Sergeant Fan Lei	范磊	2016-09-03	China Fire Services Sichuan Fire Department Ngawa Fire Department	Automobile accident
1st Lt Hu Jia	胡佳	2016-09-03	China Fire Services Sichuan Fire Department Ngawa Fire Department	Automobile accident
Major Wang Dongyang	王冬阳	2016-09-03	China Fire Services Sichuan Fire Department Ngawa Fire Department	Automobile accident
PFC Huang Shengyang	黄盛阳	2016-09-12	China Fire Services Guangxi Fire Department, Beihai Fire Department	Syncope during training
Staff Sgt Wang Yalin	王亚琳	2016-09-22	China Fire Services Liaoning Fire Department, Dalian Fire Department	Struck by vehicle while putting out fire
Corporal Wu Guoqing	吴国青	2016-10-03	China Fire Services Gansu Fire Department Jinchang Fire Department	Struck by falling power line
PFC Zhu Yicong	朱弈聪	2016-10-06	China Fire Services Guangdong Fire Department, Shenzhen Fire Department	Fell from fireman's pole
PFC Li Zhentao	李振涛	2016-10-08	China Fire Services Heilongjiang Fire Department Harbin Fire Department	Fell into elevator shaft while putting out fire
Corporal Pan Tao	潘涛	2016-10-11	Border Defense Corps Xinjiang Corps, Kizilsu Detachment	Heart attack
Lt Col. Luo Chunwei	骆春伟	2016-10-20	Border Defense Corps Guangxi Corps, Beihai detachment	Drowned during firefighting
Captain Wang Guanhao	王冠豪	2016-11-12	Border Defense Corps Jiangsu Corps, Taicang Checkpoint	Heart attack
Sergeant Zhai Linlin	柴林林	2016-11-13	China Fire Services Henan Fire Department Luoyang Fire Department	Died of wounds from fall
PFC Zhang Jubo	张巨博	2016-11-21	China Fire Services Hebei Fire Department Baoding Fire Department	Syncope
Senior Col. Yu Jiangbo	喻江波	2016-12-09	Border Defense Corps Xinjiang Corps, Tacheng Detachment	Heart attack
1st Lt Deng Biao	邓彪	2016-12-11	Border Defense Corps Guangxi Corps, Baise detachment	Heart attack
Corporal Wang Yang	王杨	2016-12-14	China Fire Services Shandong Fire Department Linyi Fire Department	Training accident during inflatable jump rescue cushion training
1st Lt Yuan Guanglin	袁广林	2016-12-20	Border Defense Corps Xinjiang Corps, Ili detachment	Vehicle fell into river
Staff Sgt Hou Wentao	侯文涛	Unknown (Confirmed on 2016-12-24)	China Fire Services Jiangxi Fire Department Yingtan Fire Department	Heart attack
Sergeant Zhu Qiang	朱强	2017-01-04	China Fire Services Shanxi Fire Department Taiyuan Fire Department	traffic accident
Lt. Col. Qin Qi	秦琦	2017-01-07	China Fire Services Chongqing Fire Department Marine Brigade	Heart attack
Staff Sgt Yuan Wengang	阮文刚	2017-01-20	China Fire Services Yunnan Fire Department Diqing Fire Department Specialist Company	Died of wounds from training accident
Colonel Shi Bin	史斌	2017-02-15	China Fire Services Shandong Fire Department Tai'an Fire Department	Heart attack
Captain Wang Huaxing	王华兴	2017-02-25	China Fire Services Henan Fire Department, Xinxiang Fire Department	Heart attack
Captain Deng Zhipang	邓志鹏	2017-03-02	Border Defense Corps Tibet Corps, Nyingchi Detachment	Altitude sickness
PFC Bai Dianyuan	白殿原	2017-03-02	Border Defense Corps Guangdong Corps Jieyang Detachment	Fall while repairing barrack cables
Staff Sgt Hu Tang	胡堂	2017-03-10	China Fire Services Yunnan Fire Department, Zhaotong Fire Department	Electrocuted while repairing station lighting
Private Yan Shihan	颜诗涵	2017-03-15	China Fire Services Xinjiang Fire Department Hotan Fire Department	Heart attack
Lt Col Yang Chunhui	杨春辉	2017-03-17	Border Defense Corps Xinjiang Corps Torugart Checkpoint	Heart attack
Major Chen Ronghuan	陈荣欢	2017-03-20	Border Defense Corps Guangdong Corps Logistics Base	Duty-related-illness
Private Dai Xinhua	戴鑫华	2017-03-29	Border Defense Corps Jiangsu Corps, Zhangjiagang Checkpoint	Syncope during training exercise
Private Cao Zhanmin	贾占敏	2017-03-31	China Fire Services Qinghai Fire Department Haixi Fire Department	Traffic accident
Lt. Col. Song Zhibiao	宋志标	2017-04-12	China Fire Services Hunan Fire Department Changsha Fire Department	Heart attack
Lt. Col. Li Ming	李明	2017-04-12	China Fire Services Henan Fire Department Sanmenxia Fire Department	Syncope
PFC Cao Shunliang	曹顺梁	2017-04-20	Border Defense Corps Tibet Corps, Shannan Detachment	Syncope while on duty
Staff Sgt. Bai Haodong	白浩东	2017-04-22	China Fire Services Gansu Fire Department Pingliang Fire Department Kongtong Battalion Qilidian Company Specialist Squad	Wounds from traffic accident
Corporal Xia Wei	夏伟	2017-05-02	Border Defense Corps Shandong Corps Laizhou Checkpoint	Syncope during training exercise
Corporal Yao Weijun	姚为君	2017-05-02	China Fire Services Fujian Fire Department Ningde Fire Department	Building collapse while putting out fire
2nd Lt Wang Qiushi	王秋实	2017-05-05	Border Defense Corps Hebei Corps Caofeidian Checkpoint	Traffic accident
Corporal Wan Zhen	万振	2017-05-18	China Fire Services Fujian Fire Department Putian Fire Department	Explosion while putting out car fire
Private Huang Minjun	黄珉俊	2017-05-18	China Fire Services Fujian Fire Department Putian Fire Department	Explosion while putting out car fire
Major Yu Wenxing	于文星	2017-06	China Fire Services Shandong Fire Department Dezhou Fire Department	Traffic accident (In Diqing)
1st Lt Yang Shuifu	杨水福	2017-06-02	China Fire Services Hunan Fire Department Changde Fire Department	Heart attack
2nd Lt Lu Aipeng	鹿爱鹏	2017-06-22	China Fire Services Heilongjiang Fire Department Mudanjiang Fire Department	Struck by vehicle
Sergeant Xu Wen	徐文	2017-06-26	3rd Hydropower Corps, 12th Detachment	Traffic accident while providing disaster relief to 2017 Sichuan landslide
Captain Gu Feng	谷峰	2017-06-26	Border Defense Corps Liaoning Corps Panjin Detachment	Traffic accident
Captain Wang Xiandong	王先东	2017-07-22	China Fire Services Jiangxi Fire Department Yichun Fire Department	Heart attack
Private Lin Hui	林辉	2017-07-22	China Fire Services Guizhou Fire Department Qiandongnan Fire Department	Training accident
PFC Yang Maolin	杨茂林	2017-07-28	Border Defense Corps Yunnan Corps, Lincang Detachment	Fainted during training exercise
Captain Gu Rui	顾睿	2017-08-05	Border Defense Corps Xinjiang Corps, Khunjerab Checkpoint	Heart attack
Corporal Huang Xiaoyan (Female)	黄小艳	2017-08-06	Border Defense Corps Hospital (In Shenzhen)	Heart attack
Staff Sgt. Liu Liang	刘良	2017-08-22	China Fire Services Hebei Fire Department Xingtai Fire Department	Traffic accident
Staff Sgt. Tian Maoyong	田茂勇	2017-08-27	China Fire Services Guizhou Fire Department Anshun Fire Department	Traffic accident
Private Jing Duoduo	靖多多	2017-09-05	China Fire Services Inner Mongolia Fire Department Baotou Fire Department	Traffic accident
Master Sgt 3rd Class Gao Lingcheng	高岭成	2017-09-10	China Fire Services Jilin Fire Department Changchun Fire Department	Syncope during training
Major Li Chao	李超	2017-09-18	China Fire Services Liaoning Fire Department Jinzhou Fire Department	Traffic accident
Lt. Col. Xu Lei	许磊	2017-09-21	China Fire Services Jiangxi Fire Department Ji'an Fire Department	Heart attack
Major Xu Baojun	徐宝军	2017-09-23	Border Defense Corps Tibet Corps, Purang Checkpoint	Traffic accident
1st Lt Fu Chao	付超	2017-09-23	Border Defense Corps Tibet Corps, Purang Checkpoint	Traffic accident
Corporal Chen Ke	陈柯	2017-10-04	China Fire Services Tibet Fire Department Shigatse Fire Department	Traffic accident
1st Lt Tian Zhengjun	田正军	2017-10-31	China Fire Services Yunnan Fire Department Lincang Fire Department	Drowned in river after getting stuck in nets during rescue attempt
Corporal Lu Xin	鲁信	2017-10-31	China Fire Services Jiangxi Fire Department Jiujiang Fire Department	Struck by vehicle while freeing people from car accident
Major Yang Rong	杨荣	2017-11-02	Border Defense Corps Shaanxi Corps	Heart attack during training
Lt. Col. Li Juncong	李俊聪	2017-11-18	Border Defense Corps Hainan Corps Logistics Office	Heart attack
Private Han Shangchong	韩尚冲	2017-11-23	China Fire Services Shandong Fire Department Dongying Fire Department	Heart attack
Corporal Xie Xingming	谢兴明	2017-11-25	Border Defense Corps Tibet Corps Shigatse Detachment	Heart attack
Lt Col Jiao Hongbin	矫洪斌	2017-11-27	Border Defense Corps Jilin Corps Baishan Detachment	Heart attack
Corporal Yu Xinglin	余兴霖	2017-12-01	China Fire Services Guizhou Fire Department, Liupanshui Fire Department	Syncope
Corporal Liang Xinzhu	梁鑫柱	2017-12-02	China Fire Services Henan Fire Department Xinyang Fire Department	Fell from training tower
Corporal Xu Zhipeng	徐智鹏	2017-12-28	China Fire Services Shaanxi Fire Department Xi'an Fire Department	Syncope
Corporal Li Pengbin	李鹏斌	2018-01-24	Yunnan Border Defense Corps Lincang Detachment	Vehicle fell off cliff during vehicle pursuit
PFC Ding Lei	丁磊	2018-04-01	Yunnan Border Defense Corps Dehong Detachment	Heart attack
Sergeant Li Baobao	李保保	2018-04-24	Shanghai Corps, 2nd Mobile Detachment, Special Operations Company	Duty-related stomach cancer
1st Lt You Xiaowei	游霄威	2018-05-08	Fujian Border Defense Corps Fuzhou Detachment	Traffic accident
Private Guan Fanqin	关凡钦	2018-07-12	Jiangsu Border Defense Corps Jingjiang Border Defense Checkpoint	Traffic accident
1st Lt Zhu Kaijie	朱恺杰	2018-08-01	Zhejiang Border Defense Corps Hangzhou Detachment	Drowning while recovering dead body at crime scene
Staff Sgt Zhang Lipeng	张利鹏	2018-08-02	China Fire Services Beijing Fire Department, Tongzhou Brigade	Drowned while saving 3 drowning tourists (Off duty in Baishi Resovoir, Chaoyang)
Sergeant He Yaofu	何耀富	2018-08-04	Yunnan Border Defense Corps Dehong Detachment	Drowned while saving drowning person
Lt. Col. Li Ruihua	李瑞华	2018-08-27	Guangxi Border Defense Corps Baise Detachment	Intracerebral hemorrhage (Incident date 2015-03-06)
Major Zhou Changshuai	周长帅	2018-10-08	Liaoning Border Defense Corps Dandong Port Checkpoint	Syncope (Incident date 2018-10-06)
1st Lieutenant Wang Chenglong	王成龙	2018-09-12	Shandong Corps, Jinan Detachment, Mobile Battalion, Special Operations Company	Struck by out-of-control truck while pushing comrade out of the way

=== 2020s ===
Name and rank	Chinese name	End of watch	Unit	Cause of Death
Corporal Li Linyu	李林雨	2022-07-12	Hubei Corps, Suizhou Detachment	Drowned while rescuing drowned person in reservoir at Suizhou
Sergeant Wang Xiaolong	汪晓龙	2023-03-24	China Coast Guard, Guangdong Coast Guard Bureau, Shanwei Municipal Coast Guard Bureau	Boat propeller strike after falling into water in smuggling interdiction operation
Corporal Miao Jian	苗鉴	2024-08-02	Ningxia Corps Mobile detachment Special Operations Battalion	Drowned during rescue operation in Jinfeng district, Yinchuan

== See also ==
- 2008 Kashgar attack
- 2003 Hengyang fire
- 2015 Tianjin explosions
- Barin uprising
- Line of duty death
