= Zhang Fusheng (politician) =

Chinese politician (born 1962)

- 张福生

Deputy Director of the Fire and Rescue Bureau of the Ministry of Emergency Management
- In office 2019 – 6 November 2022

Personal details
- Born: September 1962 (age 63)
- Party: Chinese Communist Party (expelled)

Zhang Fusheng (Chinese: 张福生; born September 1962) is a former Chinese politician, who served as the deputy director of the Fire and Rescue Bureau of the Ministry of Emergency Management from 2019 to 2022.

== Career ==
Zhang was joined the People's Liberation Army Ground Force in 1983, and he became a platoon leader of the PLA Beijing Garrison guard division. He also appointed as political department officer, political instructor of the guard company, and artillery equipment technology department officer until 1995. In 1995, he was transferred to the Ministry of Public Security and appointed as deputy director of the cadre division of the personnel and training bureau of the political department, deputy director of the research office of the political department, director of the police affairs division of the fire department of the ministry of public security and deputy director of the fire department of the ministry of public security. After the government reform in 2018, Zhang was appointed as the deputy director of the Fire and Rescue Bureau of the Ministry of Emergency Management in 2019.

== Investigation ==
On 6 November 2022, Zhang was put under investigation for alleged "serious violations of discipline and laws" by the Central Commission for Discipline Inspection (CCDI), the party's internal disciplinary body, and the National Supervisory Commission, the highest anti-corruption agency of China. He was expelled from the party and dismissed from posts on 28 June 2023. On 9 October 2024, he was sentenced to 13 years and fined 3 million yuan for taking 38.93 million yuan in bribes.
