= 2008 Kashgar attack =

Terrorist attack in Kashgar

4 August 2008 Kashgar attack
- Part of the Xinjiang conflict
- Kashgar is located in the northeast part of Kashgar Prefecture.
- Location: Near Kashgar, Xinjiang, China
- Date: 4 August 2008; 0800 (0000 GMT) –
- Target: Policemen
- Attack type: Vehicular, IED and mass stabbing
- Deaths: 16
- Injuries: 16
- Perpetrators: Kurbanjan Hemit; Abdurahman Azat; East Turkestan Islamic Movement (suspected)

The 2008 Kashgar attack (Chinese: 2008年喀什袭击事件) occurred on the morning of 4 August 2008, in the city of Kashgar in the Western Chinese province of Xinjiang. According to Chinese government sources, it was a terrorist attack perpetrated by two men with suspected ties to the Uyghur separatist movement. The men reportedly drove a truck into a group of jogging police officers, and proceeded to attack them with grenades and machetes, resulting in the death of 16 officers.

== Background ==
The region of Xinjiang in China has been subject to conflicts with a surge in terrorist incidents in the 1990s attributed to separatist militant groups, particularly the Eastern Turkestan Islamic Movement (ETIM), designated as a terrorist organisation by the United Nations. The attack was among others that preceded the Beijing 2008 Olympics, including bombings in Shanghai and Guangzhou, as well as an attempted suicide bombing on a plane in March. Activist groups including the Uyghur Human Rights Project alleges that China often exaggerates these threats to justify repression of the local Uyghur people.

== Attack ==
Two attackers were involved in the incident near the western city of Kashgar. The Xinhua News Agency said the attack happened at about 08:00 (00:00 GMT). One of the men drove a dump truck into a group of border patrol police officers as they were jogging on a street. One attacker then got out of the truck and started attacking other officers with homemade explosives. The explosives went off prematurely and blew off one of his arms. The other attacker threw improvised explosive devices at a nearby police office. He then went into the building with a knife, but was subdued by police officers inside the complex. Both perpetrators were captured during the raid. Fourteen policemen died at the scene and two died on the way to the hospital; another 16 policemen were hurt, Xinhua state news agency reported.

== Aftermath ==
Following the attack, the Chinese government tightened security in Kashgar, placing public facilities on heightened alert and restricting information flow about the attack. The attackers were identified as males, taxi driver Kurbanjan Hemit (28), and vegetable vendor Abdurahman Azat (33). They are members of the Uyghur ethnic group, and it was suspected that the attack was a terrorist action by ETIM separatists.

Xinhua called the incident a terrorist attack. Police investigators reported that they had recovered documents calling for a holy war, a homemade firearm, and nine explosives, whose design was similar to the explosives found in a raid on an ETIM facility in January 2007. A US intelligence monitoring group stated that the ETIM planned to carry out terrorist attacks during the week before the opening ceremonies of the Olympic games. This attack happened four days before the Beijing Olympics, after repeated warnings in recent months from the Chinese government that militants from the restive Xinjiang region were planning to stage attacks to disrupt the Games.

In September 2008, the New York Times reported that three tourists who witnessed the events claimed that no explosions were heard and that the attackers appeared to be machete-wielding police officers attacking other uniformed men.

=== Detention of media ===
On the night of 4 August, a Tokyo Shimbun cameraman and a Japanese TV reporter, along with two Hong Kong reporters making reports near the police post, were detained by security. The two Hong Kong reporters were not harmed. However, the Japanese reporters were beaten and punched. All four were released after two hours of detention. The Japanese government protested against the Chinese actions, although it has made no formal statement as there was no confirmation. Chinese officials and police in Kashgar apologized for the incident, but accused the two men of breaking rules.

== See also ==
- 2008 Uyghur unrest
- 2008 Summer Olympics
- List of massacres in China
- List of People's Armed Police personnel killed in the line of duty
