= 2003 Hengyang fire =

Serious fire and collapse in Hengyang

2003 Hengyang Fire
- Native name: 衡阳“11·3”特大火灾
- Date: 3 November 2003
- Location: 32-54, Xuanyuan Village, Zhuhui District, Hengyang
- Cause: illegal construction, improper usage of building, high intensity fire
- Filmed by: local news reporter
- Outcome: building demolished, trial against those responsible for construction and design
- Deaths: 20
- Injuries: 15
- Verdict: serious construction accident (5), neglect (1)
- Convictions: 6

The Hengyang "11.3" especially serious fire was a fire that occurred in Hengzhou Tower, Hengyang, Hunan Province on the early morning of November 3, 2003. The fire did not result in the death of any civilians, though 20 firefighters were killed. The subsequent collapse of the building was listed as an 'especially serious collapse and fire' by government regulators, the public security bureau and various inspectors, and the death of 20 firefighters was the largest loss of firefighters in China since 1949.

== Background ==
Hengzhou Towers was a reinforced concrete masonry supported building with nine levels constructed as part of the plan for Hengzhou Market. The building was built in the courtyard style with an atrium in the centre, surrounded by the mixed-use building divided into five connected residential blocks occupying levels 2 to 9, with each block only accessed through its own set of stairs. It was constructed in 1998, when there were incentives in Hengyang for developers to take on such projects, such as projects with a cost of less than 3,000,000 RMB were not subject to a more thorough approval phase. This posed a significant risk to safety, as this meant the plans would not be first checked by experienced engineers.

Zhuhui District, where the building was located, had a significant fire risk due to insufficient planning oversight and being a relatively historical district. Many markets in the district lacked sufficient spacing between each other, lacked firewalls and were built with non-compliant fire escapes. By December 2021, a large scale retrofitting of indoors firefighting equipment had been completed, significantly reducing the fire risk.

=== Construction ===
The building was originally built as a mixed use, residential and commercial building. Construction began in April 1997, immediately after Yongxing Group Corporation had been formed. While the approved plan was to have a building with a maximum floor area of 5809 m^{2}, the constructed building instead had a total floor area of 9300 m^{2}. Expanding building size without authorisation was common in Hengyang, which led to many buildings being inappropriately spaced from one another to as little as 2 metres, and creating fire hazards, as the new design was not signed off by enough architects. The building had two different architectural plans, where one depicting a land use of 5800 m^{2} of 3 blocks arranged east to west was to be shown to the authorities, while the other was the actually built plan showed it occupying 9300 m^{2} or 8600 m^{2} in a courtyard format, maximising the profits from construction by reducing the fees that would have to paid for constructing a larger building. The original design was planned by the city committee, and subsequently handed to Jiangdong City Construction Development Company, then given to Hengyang Yongxing Construction company, later Yongxing Group Corporation, an unlicensed construction company consisting mostly unskilled labourers. As the original plans were not required to be kept in the city archives, it made verification on the legality of construction work difficult, but this was made worse by the fact that no-one from the city administration even bothered to follow up on the significant discrepancies between the plans. Even when construction began, no attention was paid to the fact that the developers never received a permit to start work. This arrangement violated a regulation, stating that the developer was not allowed to also be the construction company for the building.

In 1997, when You Jiasi, responsible for the construction of the overall project of Hengzhou Market pointed out flaws in the construction of the building's fire exit and drainage pipes, which had to be ventilated by an air blower, he was beaten up by a group of people in the afternoon, who burst into his office. This beating resulted in three broken ribs. Eventually, Yongxing Group Corporation compensated him 20,000 RMB.

The building never received documentation allowing the construction. Instead, the company used outdated permits that merely showed the transfer of land rights to the developers. The construction company was not certified nor even qualified, and the construction of the building itself never received a permit. By paying a different company with a designing permit a total of 10,000 RMB, the developers were able to have the building appear as if had been legitimately designed. Upon completion of the residential portion of the building in October 1998, residents were immediately allowed to move in without the building undergoing a comprehensive inspection. Before an inspection is completed, the building should not be inhabited, and the residency certificates are only supposed to be issued after the inspection. The building was never inspected, as it had not received a permit to be built. As a building that had never been certified, it should not have been able to be sold, but the construction company forged documents that gave it the appearance of a legally constructed building. Through 'pre-sales', the developers were able to sell off housing that would otherwise have been illegal, and impossible to sell without a residential permit.

Nonetheless, a preliminary inspection upon completion by firefighters revealed that the building did not have adequate spacing to the buildings next to it, that there were less fire hydrants than such a building should have and insufficient firefighting apparatus inside the building. In theory, the fire department had the authority to fine the building owners and prevent its use, as stipulated in the 'Firefighting Law'.

A resident of Hengzhou Tower recalled that in 1999, the walls and ceiling around the kitchen and toilet started leaking water, and horizontal beams in the centre of the living room had shown cracks. Some of the vendors who used level 1 as a warehouse burned sulfur for the gas that it creates to process dried food. Although this was seen as a fire hazard, the property management group paid no attention to it even after the residents put together a petition.

The construction permit was issued in 2000 for a 6-story building. Even then, the actual plans were not handed over to the city archives. Out of over 20 developments by Yongxing Group, only 3 were provided to the city archives for inspection. The company used various excuses, such as being a private company or lobbying politicians to avoid more detailed scrutiny. From the available plans, several penalty notices were issued to the company, though this process complicated relations between the company and the archives, with the drawn out legal process hampering efforts to get more plans of their building developments.

=== Building ===
Various other changes to the building included reducing two evacuation stairwells to just one. The stairs from the residential to commercial areas were split into stairs on the east side of the building from level 1 to 2, and then five other stairwells that serves residential portion from 2 to 9. The building only had two hydrants, of which one lacked a hose and piping. Levels 2 to 9 were residential with 96 units housing 412 residents.

Originally, level 1 housed a medical supplies market, which closed in 1999 due to consolidation of the market. Subsequently, it was converted into a warehouse, without notifying the fire department as would be necessary, due to the changing purpose of the building. It was protected with roller shutters, but the 21 storage compartments were not closed off from one another, merely separated by a metal mesh which would contribute to the spread of the fire. It was used to store flammable goods among dry goods, but extra firefighting equipment associated with the storage of dangerous goods was never fitted and the cluttered nature hampered firefighting efforts.

== Fire ==
=== Fire reported ===
At 4:39 a.m., a fire broke out on level 1 of building, which originated in the northwest of the floor and eventually spread to the rest of the building. The security guard initially did not react to the smoke coming from Level 1, and only after a visible fire was seen did he attempt to use a dry powder fire extinguisher to fight the fire, but was unable to extinguish the fire. Subsequently, he attempted to use one of the two fire hydrants in the building, but found that the hose and pipe were missing.

The first call to 119 was connected at 5:39 a.m., giving ample time for the fire to develop. Within three minutes of the call, the first firefighters from Zhuhui District arrived with 20 firefighters in three engines and started using the hose to attempt to douse the fire. Firefighting efforts were hampered by the large amount of objects placed in the makeshift warehouse on level 1, which was mostly electronics, dry goods and synthetic rubber. When set on fire, these objects released large amounts of noxious fumes, hampering the efforts at controlling the fire. Due to the density of the illegal constructions surrounding the building, it was hard to attack the fire from outside, but also hard to do so from the inside due to the cluttered nature of the warehouse area. The courtyard layout turned the atrium area into a funnel, where the fire was extremely fierce and necessitating firefighters to cross deeply through the building to access this area.

At 5:58 a.m., an additional three water tenders, one ladder and a support vehicle were deployed from Zhuhui District; another four water tenders came from Yanfeng District and Shigu District. Two municipal water spraying vehicles were also deployed with a total of 130 firefighters arriving. This was due to low pressure in the hydrants on the street.

=== Evacuation of residents ===
As the fire occurred before sunrise, most residents were asleep and unaware of the fire. Firefighters had to run from door-to-door to wake up the residents, and alert them to evacuate from the building. By 8 am, all residents had been safely evacuated, but it was slowed down by the inadequate number of stairwells, as to go down from level 2 to 1, residents of all five blocks had to pass through a single set of stairs and the inadequate supply of breathing apparatus. A number of people opened the roller shutters to attempt to reach their level 1 storage space or stall, but due to the open-plan nature of level 1, the opening of the shutter not only allowed winds to increase the spread of the fire, but also provided more fuel for the fire to burn.

=== Collapse ===
After three hours, the fire, was brought under control at around 8 am to the ground floor and firefighters started to be rotated out to have breakfast, but at 8:33 a.m., Block 3 and 4 (the east and west wings, about two-fifths of the building) of the residential towers collapsed without warning, trapping 21 firefighters under the debris.

It was captured on camera by one of the journalists, who was injured by in the collapse.

=== Recovery ===
The search for the buried firefighters began immediately, with the first casualty was removed at 9 am and the last casualty, Nie Xueming was finally dug out after two days. Both normal police and armed police participated in the search, aided by loaders, excavators and cranes. To aid recovery, a 30 metre long, two storey building was demolished to provide easier access to the collapse. After over 70 hours, the recovery process was terminated, with one body was declared missing. The first few bodies removed were only lightly damaged, as they were not deeply buried. However, the last eight were much deeper, and due to the fire, their bodies were unrecognisable when they were recovered.

The fire was eventually extinguished by around 130 firefighters and another 50 specialist firefighters.

== Casualties ==
The collapse caused the death of 20 firefighters, mainly from a combination of traumatic brain injury and multiple chest injuries; it also injured 11 other firefighters, a security guard and four journalists. The number of deaths due to the fire and subsequent collapse far exceeded the previous number of firefighters who died on duty; the last fire with such a large amount of firefighter deaths was a fire at an oil storage facility in Qingdao, in 1989, which lead to the death of 14 firefighters.

Twenty-one firefighters were buried when the building collapsed, and except for Zhang Chunmao, who was successfully rescued, the other 20 died. He was buried for 27 hours, and suffered extensive damage to the kidneys, but was able to recover after four months of treatment.

Four journalists were injured in the collapse, with two of them being thrown off various positions when the building collapsed, while another, reporting for Hengyang TV was thrown off the level 2 balcony of the building as it collapsed while filming the firefighters.

== Aftermath ==
=== Mourning ===
On 6 November 2003, the Hengyang memorial hall held a commemorations for the farewells of 9 of the killed firefighters. Over 3000 people gathered for the event, which included Yang Zhengwu, the Party Secretary of Hunan.

A separate event on 7 November 2003 was held for the other 11 firefighters.

On 9 November 2003, a public memorial was held in Chuanshan Square, Hengyang, attended by the Public Security Bureau, the Party Secretary of Hunan to pay respects to the dead firefighters. The memorial was led by Zhou Bohua, the Governor of Hunan Province at the time. Zhou Yongkang represented Hu Jintao, Wen Jiabao and Luo Gan at the commemoration. At the same time, the firefighters of Beijing observed a moment of silence.

In the morning of 12 November 2003, the ashes of the firefighters were interred in the Martyrs' Park in Miyun District.

=== Compensation ===
In April 2002, the Hunan Public Security office took out a life insurance for all policemen and firefighters, which meant that in November, the China Life Insurance Company paid out an average of 300,000 RMB to each family. As the killed firefighters were listed as martyrs, the families each received a further 200,000 RMB.

=== Unsubstantiated rumours ===
After the fire, there was a popular rumour that the residents had called 119 at 4 am, but that the fire department did not answer the call. However, this was proven false, when the phone records on November 3 were released, which shows that the first call of the day received by the department was at 05:39:25, and the burn left by the fire meant the fire likely started between 4 and 5 am.

In 2008, a post by a netizen was criticised for containing unduly weighted content, when they called a hospital fire after a Kongming lantern hit construction netting on the building as a new 'November 3' fire. In contrast to the 2003 fire, the hospital fire caused no deaths to firefighters, and was hence seen as an inappropriate comparison.

== Investigation ==
The investigation found that the likely cause of the collapse were five supporting pillars in the northwest which were severely damaged by the fire, due to the polyethylene stored in that area led to the fire burning at a much higher temperature than other areas, contributing to its weakening. Furthermore, most pillars in the building were built with inadequate rebar that was too low in number and thinner than needed to support the building, and substandard concrete had been used in the southwest of the building. The building had a reinforced concrete frame, while levels 2 to 9 had additional masonry support with bricks, although the construction materials and method used were substandard.

The safety of the building should have been the responsibility of government of Zhuhui District, but as Yongxing Group Corporation was listed as a corporation with a 'serious risk of fire' by the city of Hengyang, actions of the company were instead supposed to be subject to scrutiny by the city. As the management of the building was spun off into a separate company, it created a legal loophole, as even though the management group was technically not linked to Yongxing Group, the district administration apparently believed that this would be the responsibility of the city administration instead. The dubious nature of the building was another reason that it was not comprehensively inspected. The construction company and developer, although bearing different names, were in fact managed and owned by the same people.

Prior to building construction, the ground surface was not surveyed. This, in combination with a shortened foundation constructed with poor forming of the reinforced concrete significantly weakened the structure. Reinforced concrete foundation pillars retrieved from the collapse site tested only supported 150 and 220 kN of force, while the design required 350 kN of support. Support columns were missing in much of the uncollapsed structure. Furthermore, the structure contained 20 tons of unusable grade concrete, which was not treated.

A different report wrote that the testing of the concrete and metal from the collapsed building showed that all of them, except for one of the three reinforcing plain bars having a somewhat lower actual tensile strength than the design strength, were able to meet the required design strength, although with the building originally designed for commercial use, the pillars on level 1 could not handle the high energy fire due to the stored chemical products. This does not guarantee that the building is safe, as the building indeed had construction errors at the joints between concrete slabs and the frame relating to the slabs not being firmly connected to the columns. Had they been tied together better, the building could have retained the structure and reduced structural deformation, which resulted in the collapse.

Due to the chemicals stored on the ground floor, the burning of it released high energy with 45.9% of level 1 burning at above 800 °C, and limited parts of the building were burning at 1000 °C to 1500 °C. Such high temperatures meant the metal began sintering and along with thermal expansion, resulting in excess vertical displacement of the pillar. The building eventually collapsed after columns within the structure failed due to the reduced capacity and shifting of the building, which redistributed the load to other pillars, causing a collapse.

According to residents, the fire was caused by a vendor drying Illicium verum by burning sulphur and due to the warehouse environment, the fire would easily spread to nearby materials, such as clothing.

The investigation also highlighted the lack of specialised rescue equipment, such as infrared cameras and breathing apparatuses.

=== Trial verdict ===
The trial began on 26 October 2004 at the People's Court in Zhuhui District, accusing Li Wenge, Li Yongkai, Wei Dongheng, Zhu Feng and Xiao Wei of extremely serious crimes in construction, and Shen Liming of serious neglect. The final verdict was delivered on 1 April 2005:

Name	Role	Crime	Punishment
Li Wenge (李文革)	Chairman of Hengyang Yongxing, responsible for the Tower's design	Serious construction accident	1.5 years jail, fine of 20,000 RMB
Wei Dongheng (魏东衡)	Former engineer of Jiangdong Construction company	Serious construction accident	3 years jail, fine of 50,000 RMB
Li Yongkai (李永开)	Deputy chairman of Yongxing Group, manager of Yongxing Construction Company	Serious construction accident	2 years jail, fine of 50,000 RMB
Zhu Feng (朱峰)	Engineer of Hengyang city Construction School, leading architect of this building	Serious construction accident	1 year jail, fine of 30,000 RMB
Xiao Wei (肖伟)	Engineer of Hengyang city Construction School, responsible for structural design of this building	Serious construction accident	1 year jail, fine of 30,000 RMB
Shen Liming (沈黎明)	Manager of Hengyang Yongxing Property Management company	Serious neglect of duty	3 years jail

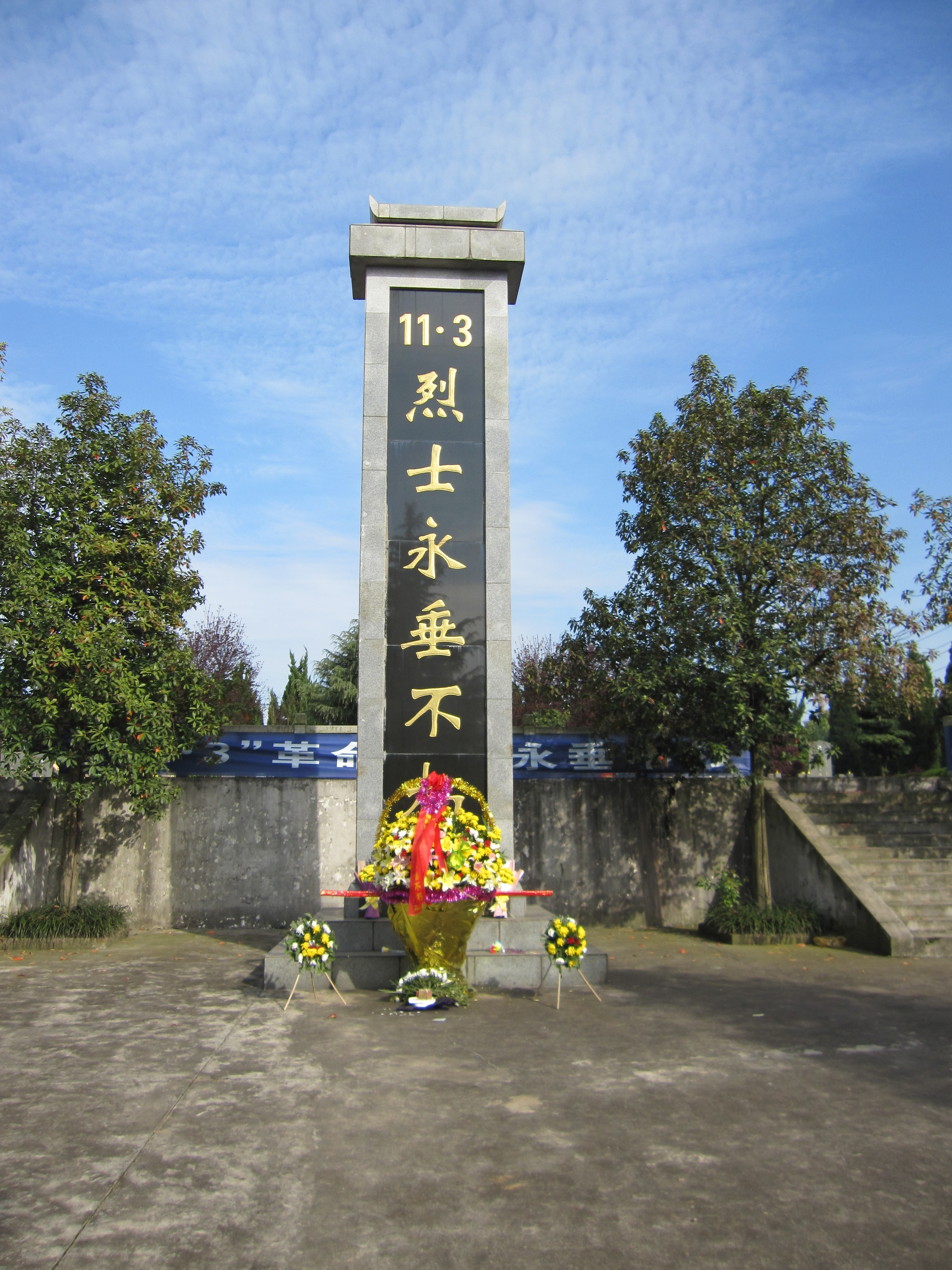
The monument dedicated to the dead firefighters in the Hengyang Martyrs' Park

The 17 lessors who used level 1 as a warehouse sought compensation for damages; in total, Wen Ge, the Chairman of Yongxing Group, Yongxing Property Management company and the person who caused the fire, Wang Yuliang paid 3,524,223 RMB.

=== Lawsuits ===
The families of 19 of the killed firefighters launched a lawsuit against Yongxing Group, seeking compensation.

For reasons unknown, only 17 families ultimately launched the suit against Yongxing Group, Zhu Feng, Xiao Wei, Yongxing Property Management Company among four others for compensation up to a total of 4,340,000 RMB, while in total, the various suits against the company was for up to 20,000,000 RMB.

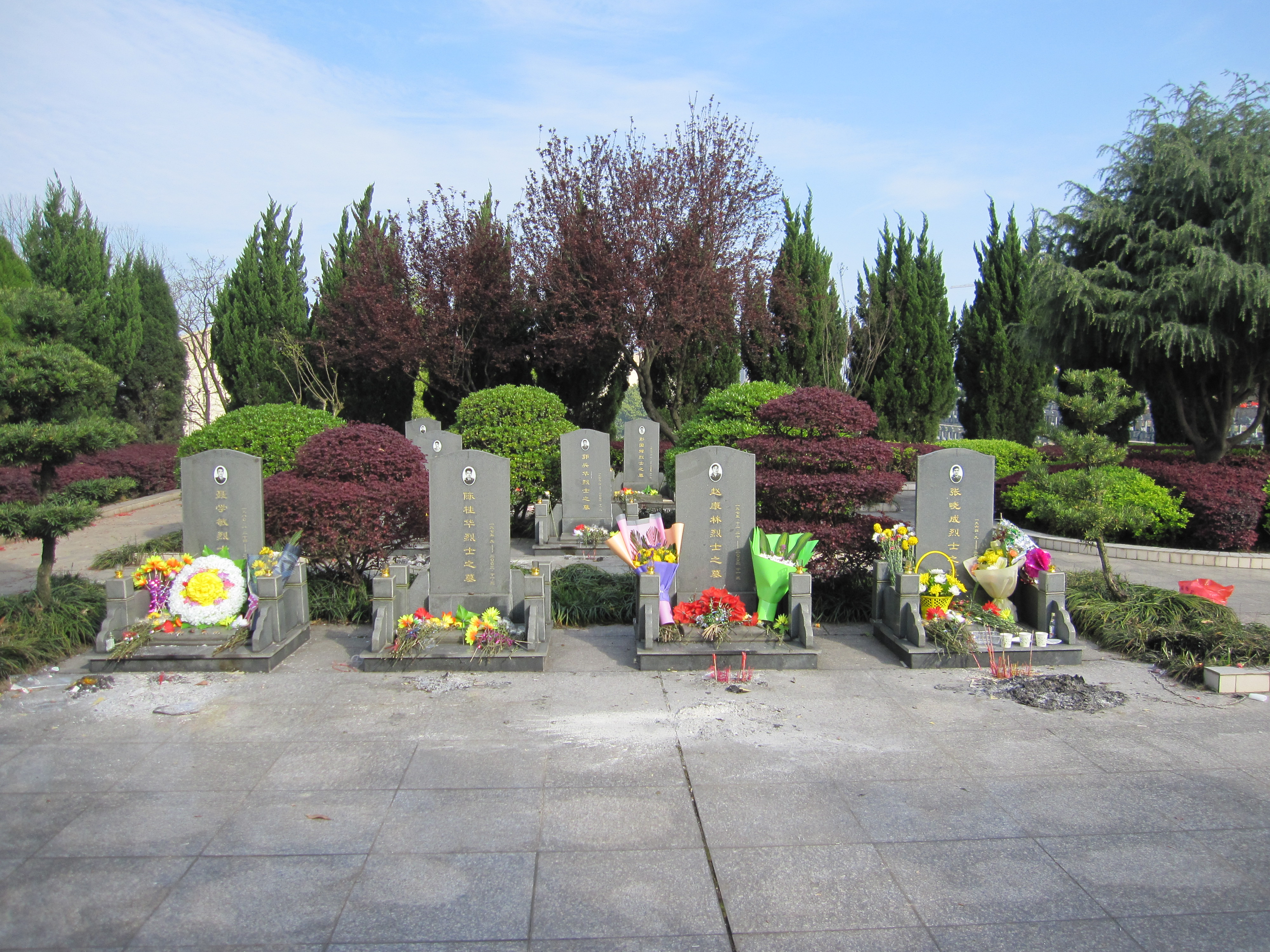
The gravestones of the killed firefighters in the Hengyang Martyr Park

== Memorials ==
The memorial was originally to be located at the site of the collapse, but was later changed to the Hengyang Martyrs' Park.

- "11.3" Martyr Remembrance Monument

In November 2006, to commemorate the sacrifices of the 20 firefighters, the Party Secretary of Hengyang, and the municipal government decided to erect a monument in the Hengyang Martyrs' Park with the graves located behind the monument. The deaths are publicly commemorated on every Martyr Remembrance Day.

== Documentaries ==
- CCTV "Law Online" 《2003 Hunan Hengyang 11·3 especially serious fire》
- December 2003, CPC Hengyang City History Research Documentary《Fire quenching Vajra–Documentary on extinguishing the 11·3 Hengyang especially large fire》

== See also ==
- List of People's Armed Police personnel killed in the line of duty
