= Line of duty death =

Manner of death for first responders

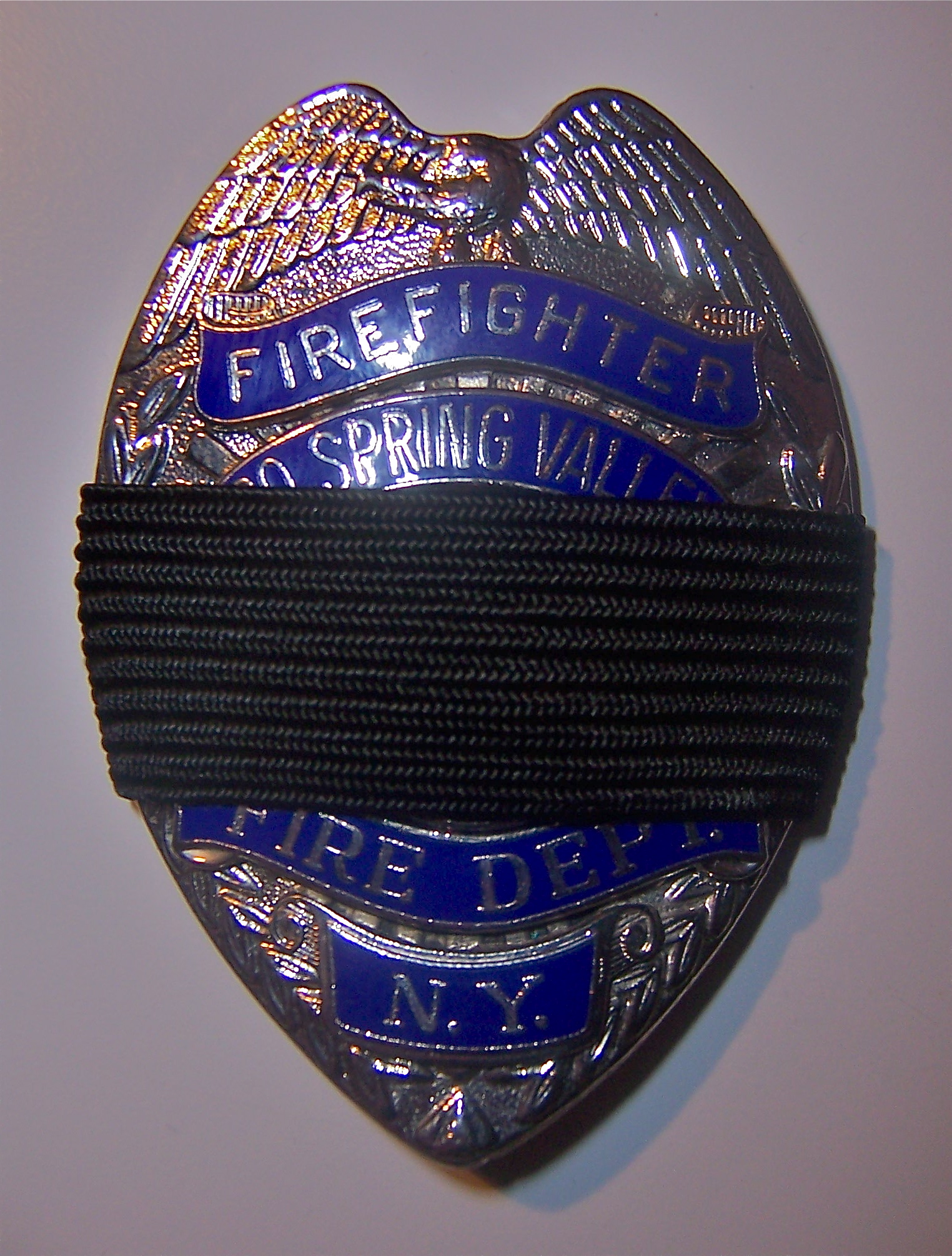
A mourning band on a firefighters' badge.

A line of duty death (LODD) is a death in the emergency services while on duty.

== United States ==
=== Firefighting ===
The National Fire Protection Association (NFPA) report has tracked on-duty firefighter deaths in the United States since 1977. The average annual number of on-duty firefighter deaths from 2014 to 2018 was 65. However, in 2019, there were 48 on-duty firefighter deaths in the United States, a sharp drop and the first year that the annual total was under 50 deaths. Of the 48 on-duty deaths in 2019, 20 were career firefighters and 25 were volunteer firefighters, one was a civilian Defense Department employee, one was a state land management employee, and one was a federal land management agency employee.

Sudden cardiac death has consistently constituted the largest share of on-duty firefighter deaths. Of 2019 on-duty firefighter deaths in the U.S., 54% were due to medical emergencies, overexertion, or stress (included in this category were 22 heart attacks or other sudden cardiac deaths, 2 strokes, 1 heatstroke, and 1 suicide); 13% by fire progress (such as being trapped or overrun) or explosions, 8% were struck by a vehicle, 8% died in vehicle crashes, 6% fell from heights (such as buildings, fire apparatus, roofs, and bridges), and 10% died from other causes. In 2019, of on-duty firefighter deaths, 27% died at fire sites (10 structure fires, 3 wildland fires), 19% died during non-fire emergencies, 19% died while responding to or returning from alarms, 10% died in training, and 25% died in other on-duty settings (such as performing ordinary fire station, administrative, or maintenance duties).

=== Police ===
An analysis of FBI data published in 2019 in the Criminology & Public Policy found that police line-of-duty deaths in the United States fell 75% between 1970 and 2016. The number of deaths from aircraft crashes and accidental gunfire declined over time, but deaths in car chases were stable, and deaths from vehicular assaults doubled.

According to data compiled by the National Law Enforcement Officers Memorial, over the period 2010 to 2019, there were 1,627 U.S. police officer line-of-duty deaths, including 528 deaths by gunfire, 459 deaths from job-related illness, 335 deaths from automobile crashes, 130 from being struck by a vehicle, 58 in motorcycle crashes, 25 by drowning, 20 by beatings, 19 in falls, 13 in aircraft accidents, 5 by strangulation, 4 by being struck by train, 3 by electrocution, 2 in horse-related accidents, and 1 in a terrorist attack. Deaths in motor vehicle crashes or motor vehicle strikes represented about 43% of all police line-of-duty deaths over the period 2006 through 2019 (about 809 deaths); these are preventable injuries.

In 2019, 48 law enforcement officers died in line-of-duty injuries from "felonious incidents" while 41 died in accidents. Of the 48 deaths in felonious incidents, 15 were connected to "investigative/enforcement activities" (including traffic stops, investigations, and encounters with fugitives); 9 deaths were connected to "tactical situations" (such as barricade/hostage situations or service of search or arrest warrants); 5 officers died in unprovoked attacks; 4 officers died while responding to reports of crimes in progress; 3 officers died while in a car pursuits; 3 officers died while trying to make an arrest. Of the 41 accidental deaths, 19 died in motor vehicle crashes, 16 were pedestrians struck by vehicles; 3 died in "firearm-related incidents"; and 2 officers drowned.

More than 90% of homicides of U.S. law enforcement officers are caused by gunshot. For example, in 2019, 44 of the 49 officers feloniously killed were killed by firearms. A 2015 study published in the American Journal of Public Health, analyzing FBI data from 1996 to 2010, studied the link between firearm prevalence (measured by the mean household firearm ownership) and homicides of police officers using a Poisson regression. The study concluded that, when controlling for other variables, law enforcement homicide rates "were 3 times higher in states with high firearm ownership compared with states with low firearm ownership."

A 2018 white paper, commissioned by the Ruderman Family Foundation, found that U.S. police officers and U.S. firefighters were more likely to die by suicide than in the line of duty. Both police and firefighters have considerably higher rates of suicide when compared to the population at large. Citing prior studies, the white paper connected elevated suicide rates among police and firefighters to "critical incidents" (traumatic events) experienced in the line of duty, leading to higher rates of post-traumatic stress and depression. The white paper called for de-stigmatization of mental health concerns among first responders (stating that "shame and stigma are arguably the strongest barriers that stand between first responders and mental health services") and more suicide prevention initiatives for first responders.

In 2021, the United States experienced a 55% increase in police officer line-of-duty deaths, totaling 458 law enforcement officers killed. 2021 also saw a 115% increase in "ambush-style" attacks on law enforcement, marking one of the deadliest years for the profession.

=== Other ===
Following the events of November 17th and 18th, 1978, Congressman Leo Ryan was posthumously given the Congressional Gold Medal and is considered to be the only Congressman to die in the line of duty.

== United Kingdom ==
Police line-of-duty deaths are far less common in Britain than in the United States. From 1900 to 2014, 249 British police officers died in the line of duty; adjusting for number of police officers, U.S. police line-of-duty deaths are 10 times higher than British police line-of-duty deaths.

A comparison of police deaths in New York City and Greater London from 1900 through 1999 found that "both intentional and unintentional occupational police mortality rates were significantly greater in New York compared to London"; the study officers identified "socioeconomic, cultural, and occupational factors" (including the widespread prevalence of firearms in the U.S.) as the likely factors explaining the discrepancy.

== China ==
=== Law enforcement ===
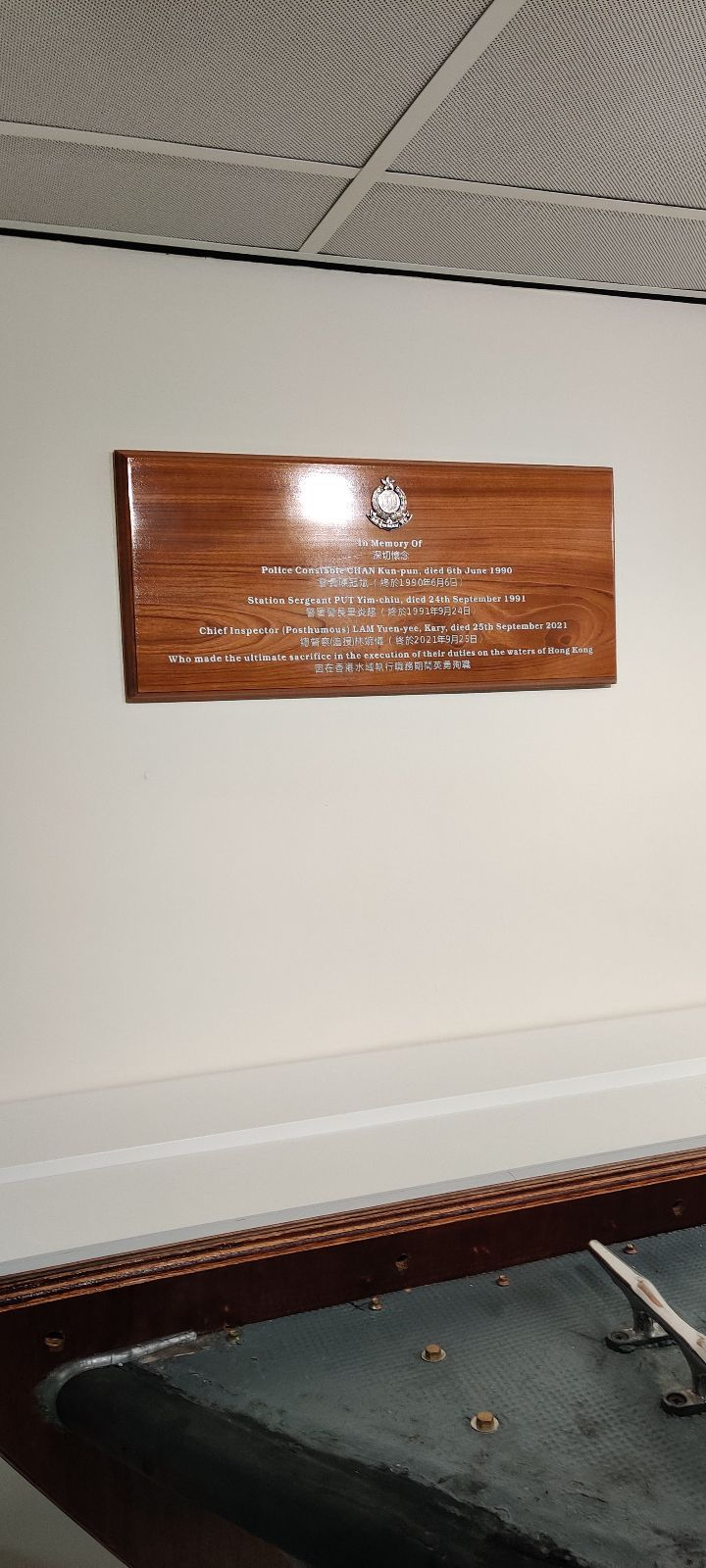
Marine Region memorial plaque to officers killed in the line of duty

The Chinese Ministry of Public Security publishes a yearly honor roll during Qingming Festival for all line of duty deaths in the Ministry of Public Security.

Between 1949 and 2023, approximately 17,000 Chinese civilian police officers (not including the People's Armed Police) died in the line of duty.

In 2024, a total of 208 Sworn officers and 174 auxiliary officers of the Ministry of Public Security were killed in the line of duty, with a further 4743 sworn officers and 3710 auxiliary officers being injured in the line of duty the same year.

In the MPS's subordinate agencies, the badge number of fallen officers are often never reused except in cases where their siblings or family members join the same agency, in which case they can "inherit" their sibling/parent's badge number.

In 2012, a report by Legal Daily found the primary cause for line of duty deaths in China was sudden cardiac arrest (often stress related), with the second highest cause being traffic accidents, while for line of duty injuries the leading cause was violence. The category of police officers with the most LODDs were standard police station officers, followed by traffic police and investigators.

=== Firefighting ===
Between 1949 and 2020, a total of 636 standard firefighters and 87 forest firefighters died in the line of duty in China, including firefighters from the China Fire and Rescue, People's Armed Police Forestry Corps and China Fire Services, the most deadly incident being the 2015 Tianjin Explosions, followed by the 2019 Muli wildifires.
