= List of prisons in Zhejiang =

This is a list of prisons within Zhejiang province of the People's Republic of China.

Name	Enterprise name	City/County/District/Prefecture	Village/Town	Established	Notes
Changhu Prison	Changhu Construction Materials Plant; Changhu Prison Cement Plant	Changxing County, Huzhou	Lijiaxiang		
Huanghu Prison	Xinxing Brickyard	Yuyao, Ningbo			
Huzhou Prison	Shilifeng Farm	Huzhou		1984	1,715 prisoners as of March 2006, 2001–2003 detained 1,787, released 1,547
Jinhua Prison	Jiangtang Farm	Wucheng District, Jinhua	Jiangtang	1954	About 10,000 inmates
Nanhu Prison	Nanhu Tree Farm; Zhejiang Anji Nanhu Tea Company; Nanhu Prison Cement Plant	Anji County	Gaoyu		Exports to Japan, the U. S. and France
Provincial No. 1 Prison	Zhejiang Wuyi Machine Plant	Quzhou			For inmates with sentences of 15 years and more, 3,000 inmates, produces calabashes
Provincial No. 2 Prison	Hangzhou Qianjiang Metal Tools Plant	Yuhang District, Hangzhou		1951	Jianxin brand is produced there
Provincial No. 3 Prison		Changshan County, Quzhou	Qiuchuan		
Provincial No. 4 Prison	Hangzhou Wulin Machinery Co. Ltd.	Yuhang District	Linping	1952	
Provincial No. 5 Prison	Qixin Machine Works; Wucheng Prison Tea Factory	Wucheng District, Jinhua	Bailongqiao	1959	
Zhejiang Women's Prison	Muyuan Silk Mill	Hangzhou		1984	About 2,700 inmates, some from Anhui
Qiaosi Prison	Qiaosi Farm; Zhejiang Prov. Hangjiang Milk & Dairy Products Factory; Automobile Plant; Distillery; Hangzhou Milling Machine Manufacturing Ltd.	Hangzhou			On April 15, 2004, of 3,440 45% had life or postponed death sentences
Southern Suburb Prison	Hongken Farm	Xiaoshan District, Hangzhou			
Shilifeng Prison	Brickyard; Shilifeng Farm; Zhejiang Fire Control Chemical Plant	Qujiang, Quzhou		1955	As of 27 October 2005, has housed 96,900 inmates
Shiliping Prison	Shiliping Brickyard	Longyou County, Quzhou	Hu		
Wangchun Prison		Ningbo			
Western Suburb Prison	Qianjiang Cement Plant	Yuhang District, Hangzhou	Xianlin		As of April 2004, held 2,000 prisoners aged 18–35

== Sources ==
- "Laogai Handbook 2007-2008" (PDF) (in Chinese and English). Washington, D.C.: Laogai Research Foundation. October 2008. pp. 511–522. ISBN 978-1-931550-25-3.
