= National Fire and Rescue Administration =

Chinese government agency

- 国家消防救援局

- Flag of the China Fire and Rescue

Operational area
- Country: China

Agency overview
- Established: January 6, 2023
- 1st Commissar: Wang Xiangxi
- Fire Chief: Zhou Tian
- Political Commissar: Li Liangsheng

Website
- 119.gov.cn

National Fire and Rescue Administration (国家消防救援局; NFRA), is an agency under the Ministry of Emergency Management which oversees the China Fire and Rescue, China's firefighter force.

== History ==
On January 6, 2023, the NFRA was founded by merging the Ministry of Emergency Management's Fire and Rescue Bureau and Forest Fire Bureau.

== Organization ==
=== Fire and rescue departments ===
Before the institutional reform, the fire-fighting force primarily consisted of the China Fire Services, along with volunteer fire departments operated by local governments and enterprises. The Public Security Fire Brigade served as the core force and operated under the leadership of public security authorities. Its management system combined both sectoral and hierarchical oversight, and it was classified within the armed police structure.

Each province and city has a fire and rescue department, while county level subdivisions have a fire battalion.

Following the Framework Programme for the Formation of the National Comprehensive Fire and Rescue Corps, the new structure designates fire and rescue headquarters at the provincial level, fire and rescue detachments at the district level, and fire and rescue brigades at the county level. These brigades oversee fire and rescue stations (squadrons), ensuring a more structured and coordinated approach to emergency response.

There are 31 firefighting departments and 3 training corps:

- Beijing Fire and Rescue
- Shanghai Fire and Rescue
- Tianjin Fire and Rescue
- Chongqing Fire and Rescue
- Hebei Provincial Fire and Rescue Department
- Shanxi Provincial Fire and Rescue Department
- Jilin Provincial Fire and Rescue Department
- Liaoning Provincial Fire and Rescue Department
- Heilongjiang Provincial Fire and Rescue Department
- Shaanxi Provincial Fire and Rescue Department
- Gansu Provincial Fire and Rescue Department
- Qinghai Provincial Fire and Rescue Department
- Shandong Provincial Fire and Rescue Department
- Fujian Provincial Fire and Rescue Department
- Zhejiang Provincial Fire and Rescue Department
- Henan Provincial Fire and Rescue Department
- Hubei Provincial Fire and Rescue Department
- Hunan Provincial Fire and Rescue Department
- Jiangxi Provincial Fire and Rescue Department
- Jiangsu Provincial Fire and Rescue Department
- Anhui Provincial Fire and Rescue Department
- Guangdong Provincial Fire and Rescue Department
- Hainan Provincial Fire and Rescue Department
- Sichuan Provincial Fire and Rescue Department
- Guizhou Provincial Fire and Rescue Department
- Yunnan Provincial Fire and Rescue Department
- Inner Mongolia Autonomous Region Fire and Rescue Department
- Xinjiang Autonomous Region Fire and Rescue Department
- Ningxia Autonomous Region Fire and Rescue Department
- Guangxi Autonomous Region Fire and Rescue Department
- Tibet Autonomous Region Fire and Rescue Department
- National Fire and Rescue Administration Tianjin Training Corps
- National Fire and Rescue Administration Kunming Training Corps
- National Fire and Rescue Administration Nanjing Training Corps

=== Forestry fire Departments ===
There are 9 forest fire departments:

- Inner Mongolia Autonomous Region Forest Fire Department
- Jilin Provincial Forest Fire Department
- Heilongjiang Provincial Forest Fire Department
- Fujian Provincial Forest Fire Department
- Sichuan Provincial Forest Fire Department
- Yunnan Provincial Forest Fire Department
- Tibet Autonomous Region Forest Fire Department
- Gansu Provincial Forest Fire Department
- Xinjiang Autonomous Region Forest Fire Department

Additionally, the NFRA has the Administration Mobile Detachment, the Daqing Aerial Rescue Detachment and the Kunming Aerial Rescue Detachment. They operate Z-8 helicopters.

=== Academies ===
- China Fire and Rescue Institute

== Management ==
NFRA manages the China Fire Museum

== Agency chiefs ==
=== 1st Commissar ===
- Wang Xiangxi (王祥喜) - Incumbent, 2023–Present

=== Fire Chief ===
- Zhou Tian (周天) - Incumbent, 2024–Present
- Choser (琼色, ཆིང་སེ།) - 2023–2024

=== Political Commissar ===
- Li Liangsheng (李良生) - Incumbent, 2025–Present
- Hao Junhui (郝军辉) - 2024–2025
- Xu Ping (徐平) - 2023–2024

== See also ==
- People's Armed Police
- National Fire Agency
