= China Fire and Rescue =

Chinese emergency service

National Comprehensive Firefighting and Rescue Force / China Fire and Rescue (CFR)
- 国家综合性消防救援队伍

- Flag of the China Fire and Rescue

Operational area
- Country: China

Agency overview
- Established: October 10, 2018
- Staffing: 220,000 as of 2023
- 1st Commissar: Wang Xiangxi
- Fire Chief: Zhou Tian (politician)
- Political Commissar: Li Liangsheng
- Motto: Loyalty to the Party, strict discipline, devotion to fire and dedication to the people.（对党忠诚、纪律严明、赴汤蹈火、竭诚为民）

Facilities and equipment
- Provincial fire departments: 31
- Training Corps: 3
- Forest fire departments: 9
- Stations: 9657 as of 2023

Website
- 119.gov.cn

China Fire and Rescue (CFR, Chinese: 国家综合性消防救援队伍; trans. "National Comprehensive Firefighting and Rescue Force") is China's primary firefighting force, which is overseen by the National Fire and Rescue Administration (NRFA). CFR responsibilities include fire and rescue tasks, forest firefighting, preventing and resolving major safety risks, disasters and accident response, and national fire prevention and emergency rescue tasks.

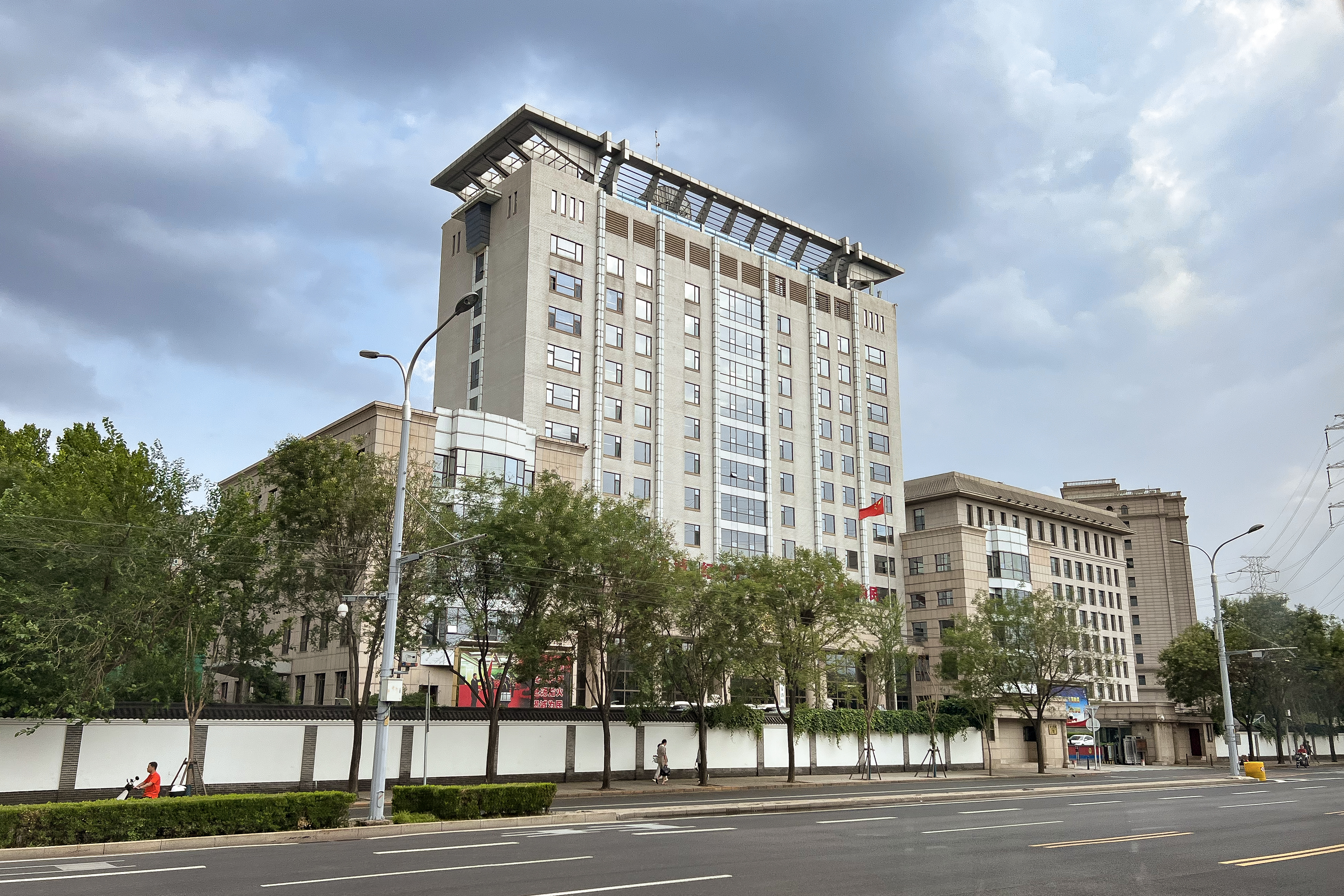
The headquarters of the national fire and rescue administration

== History ==
On March 17, 2018, the 13th National People's Congress approved the creation of the Ministry of Emergency Management (MEM), which took over disaster and emergency response and management responsibilities from various agencies, with the Ministry of Public Security's China Fire Services and People's Armed Police Forestry Corps.

Emblem of China Fire and Rescue Force during the transition

CFR was officially established on October 10, 2018 by amalgamating relevant MEM response units. It was managed by the MEM's Fire and Rescue Bureau and Forest Fire Bureau in a similar manner to the People's Police. MEM received the CFR's flag from General Secretary of the Chinese Communist Party Xi Jinping at a ceremony at the Great Hall of the People on November 9. The National Fire and Rescue Administration was created on January 6, 2023, by merging the MEM bureaus.

In June 2024, fire and rescue organizations were publicly designated as "Provincial Fire and Rescue Bureaus" and "Municipal Fire and Rescue Bureaus" depending on their administrative level.

== Duties ==
CFR responsibilities include fire and rescue tasks, forest firefighting, preventing and resolving major safety risks, disasters and accident response, and national fire prevention and emergency rescue tasks.

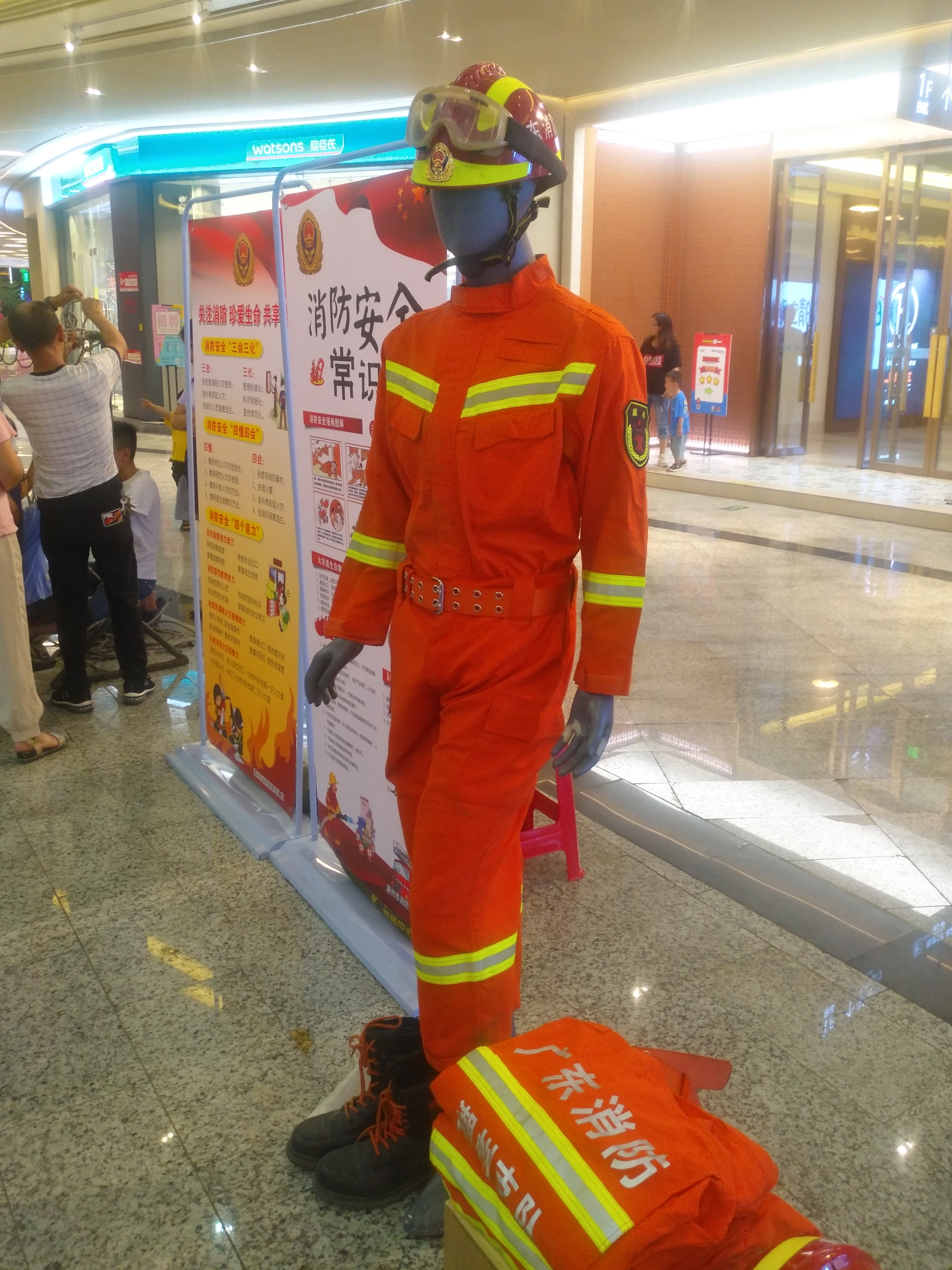
China Fire And Rescue Uniform - Type 2018

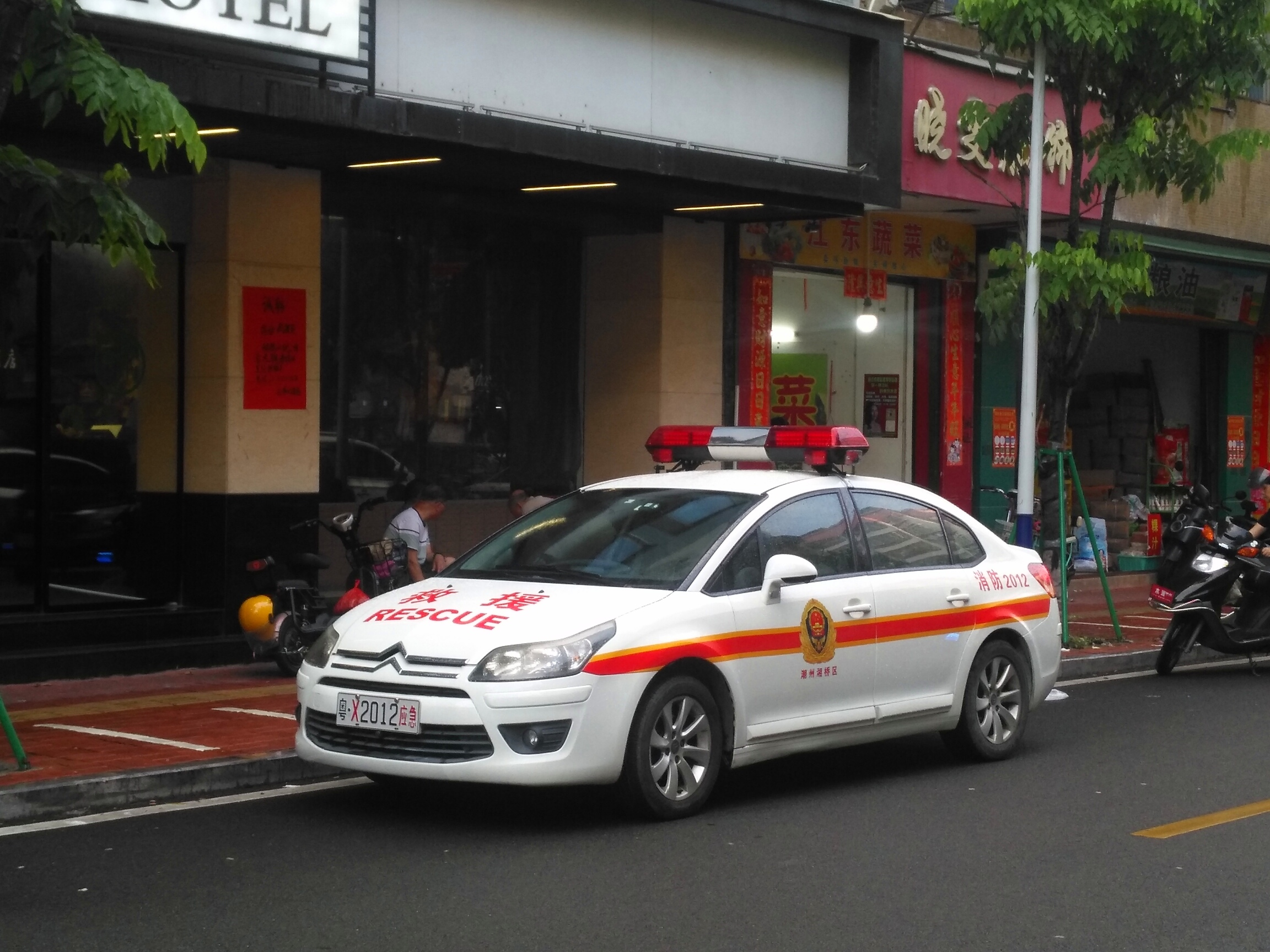
A Dongfeng Citroën C-Triomphe command vehicle Chaozhou City

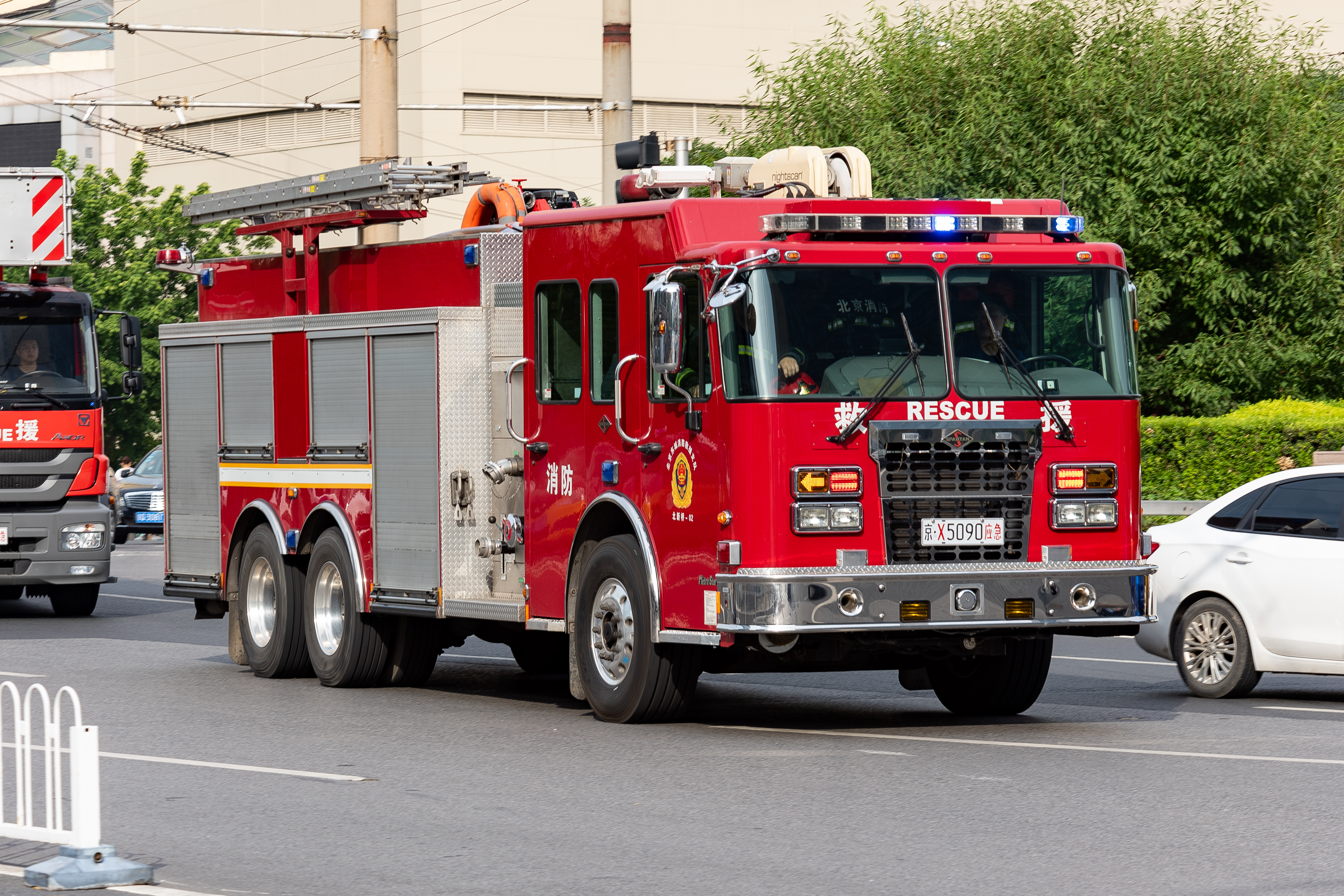
A Spartan fire truck with type 2018 plates, Dongcheng District Fire and Rescue Department, Beijing City

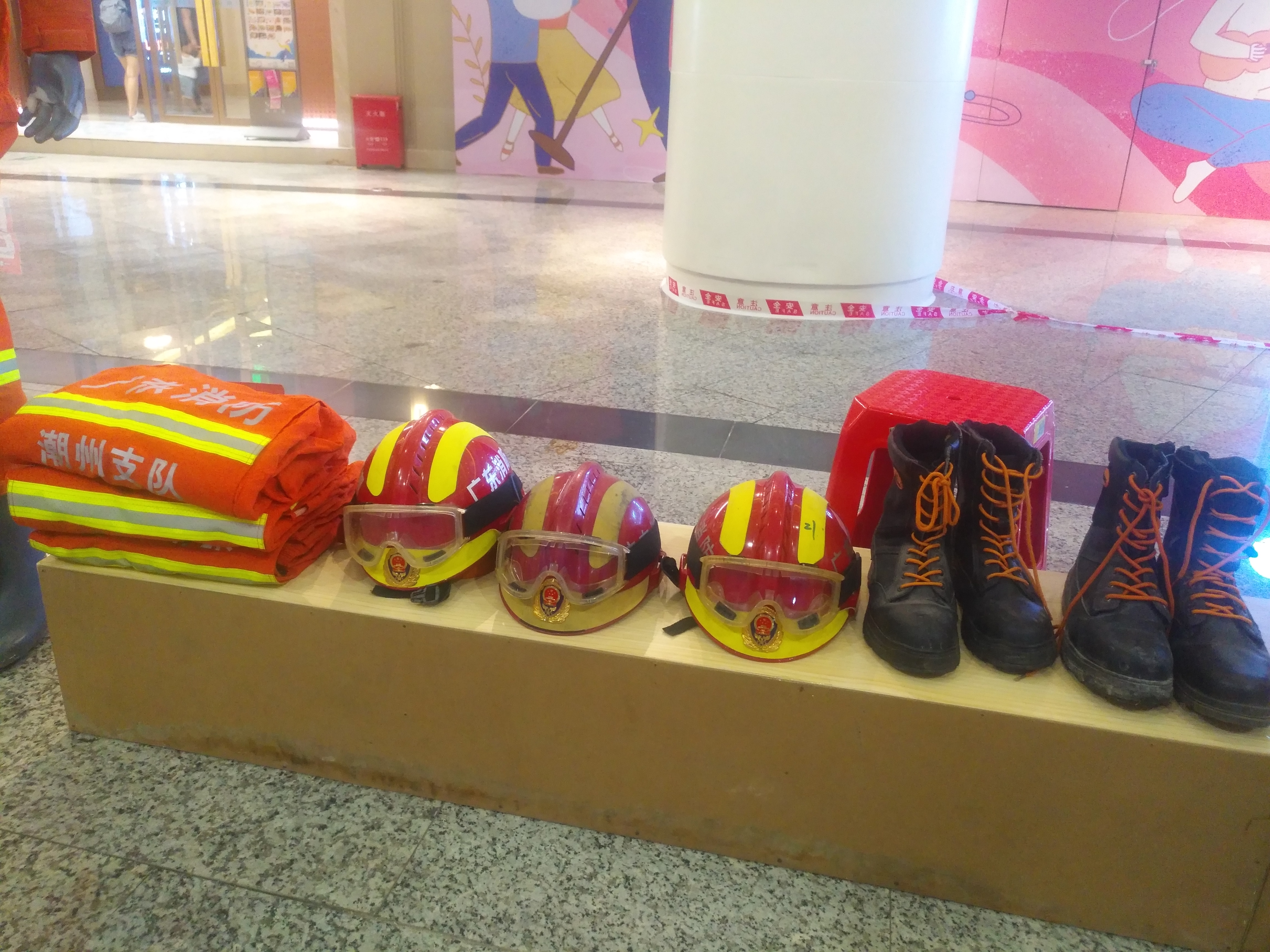
Type 2018 firefighting PPE

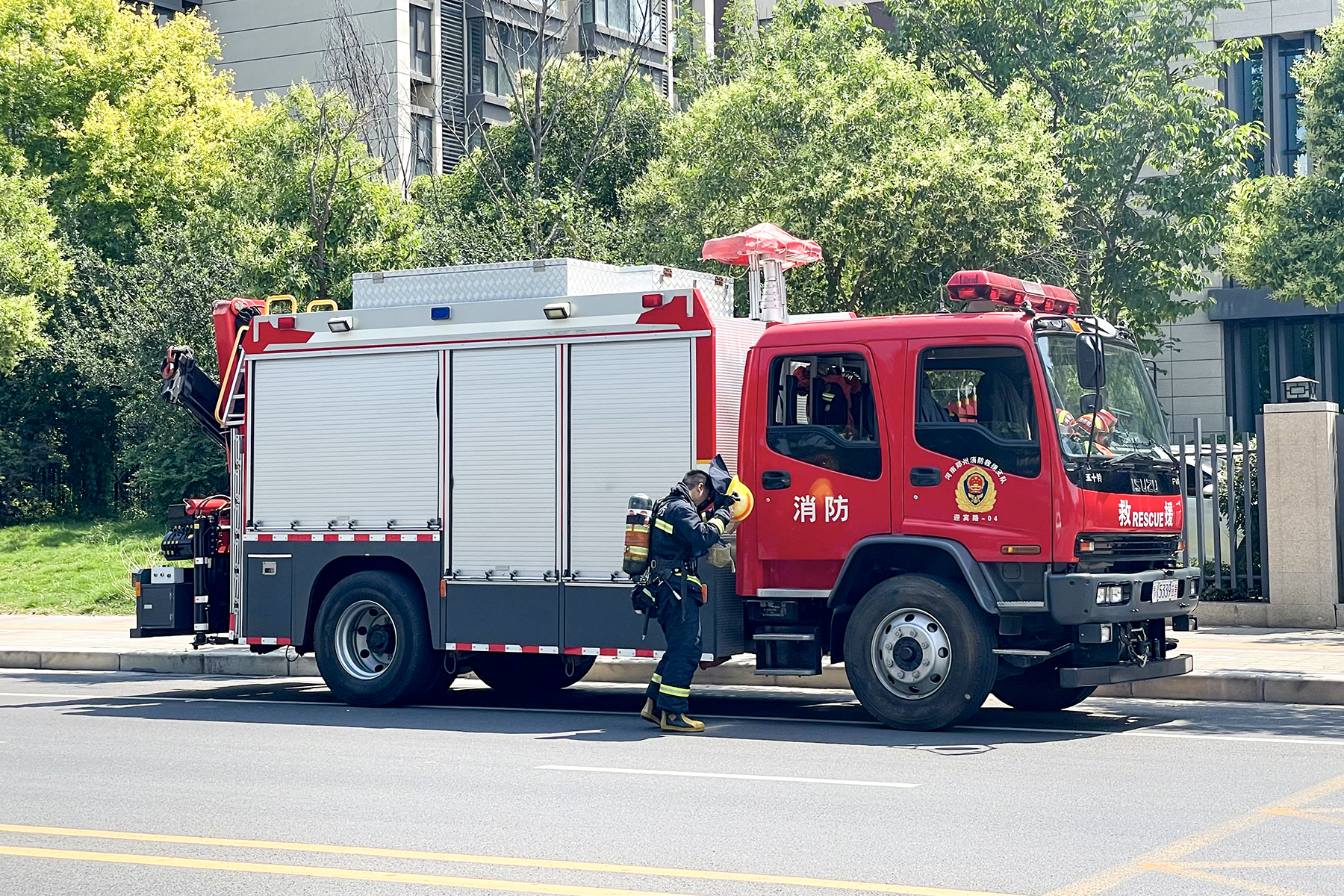
Isuze FVR fire engine of Yingbin Road Fire Station in Zhengzhou in 2023

== Oath ==
The official oath of China Fire and Rescue reads as follows

中国消防救援队誓词 (Oath of the China Fire and Rescue)

我志愿加入国家消防救援队伍，

I, having voluntarily joined China Fire and Rescue, pledge that:

对党忠诚，纪律严明，赴汤蹈火，竭诚为民，

[I will] be loyal to the [Chinese communist] party, have strict discipline, walk through fire, [and] do everything to serve the people,

坚决做到服从命令、听从指挥，恪尽职守、

always finish my orders, obey my chiefs, and perform my duties,

苦练本领，不畏艰险、不怕牺牲，

be hardworking during training, not be scared of difficulties, and not be afraid of sacrificing [myself],

为维护人民生命财产安全、维护社会稳定贡献自己的一切。

and do everything in my power to protect societal stability and to protect lives and property.

== Identification ==
=== Rank and uniform ===
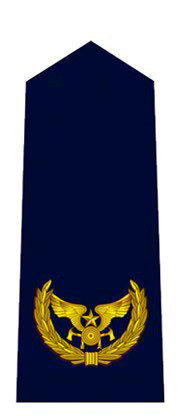
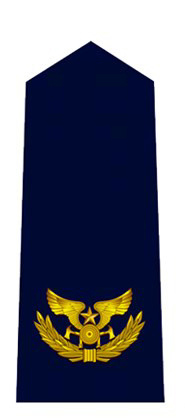
Commissioner	Deputy commissioner	Assistant commissioner	Commanders				Battalion chiefs
Director general 总监	Deputy; Director General 副总监	Assistant; Director General 助理总监	Senior Commander 高级指挥长	Commander 1st Class 一级指挥长	Commander 2nd Class 二级指挥长	Commander 3rd Class 三级指挥长	Battalion Chief 1st Class 一级指挥员	Battalion Chief 2nd Class 二级指挥员	Battalion Chief 3rd Class 三级指挥员	Battalion Chief 4th Class 四级指挥员

Senior firefighters			Intermediate firefighters		Junior firefighters
Captain 1st Class 一级消防长	Captain 2nd Class 二级消防长	Captain 3rd Class 三级消防长	Firefighter 1st Class 一级消防士	Firefighter 2nd Class 二级消防士	Firefighter 3rd Class 三级消防士	Firefighter 4th Class 四级消防士	Probationary firefighter 预备消防士

=== Flag and Emblem ===
The flag consists of two colors: red and blue. The red symbolizes the Chinese Communist Party (CCP) and the nation, while the blue represents the fire and rescue force, signifying that the team operates under the leadership of the Party and the state as a disciplined force. At the center of the flag is an emblem featuring a shield supported by olive branches, symbolizing the team's role as guardians of public safety, property, and social stability.

The emblem primarily features gold as its main color, with blue in the central area. Olive and pine branches flank the shield, representing the team's responsibility to protect the safety of people's lives, property, and maintain social stability. The inclusion of the national emblem signifies the authority of the state and reflects the team's mission to perform its duties in accordance with the law.

The symbol is encircled by olive branches, symbolizing peace and safety. Five five-pointed stars represent the lawful fulfillment of state-assigned duties. The clasped wrists symbolize rescue efforts, while the wings of an eagle denote responsiveness and swift action. Crossed axes and a fire hose indicate the team's firefighting functions.

=== Plate and painting ===
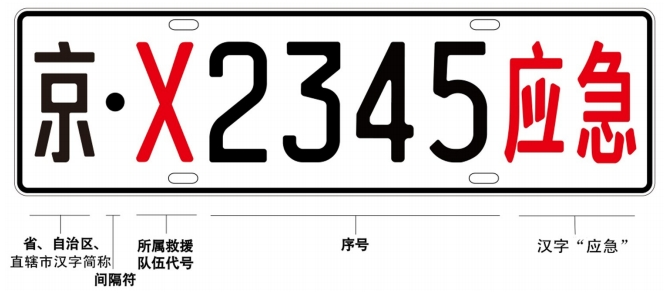
The sample number plate of CFR vehicles

The front part of fire engines are painted with the words "RESCUE", the side of the vehicle body is painted with the words "China Fire and Rescue Force", "FIRE" and the name and vehicle number of the affiliated unit, the roof is painted with the vehicle number, and the decorative strips are painted on both sides of the vehicle body and the rear of the vehicle.

== Statistics ==
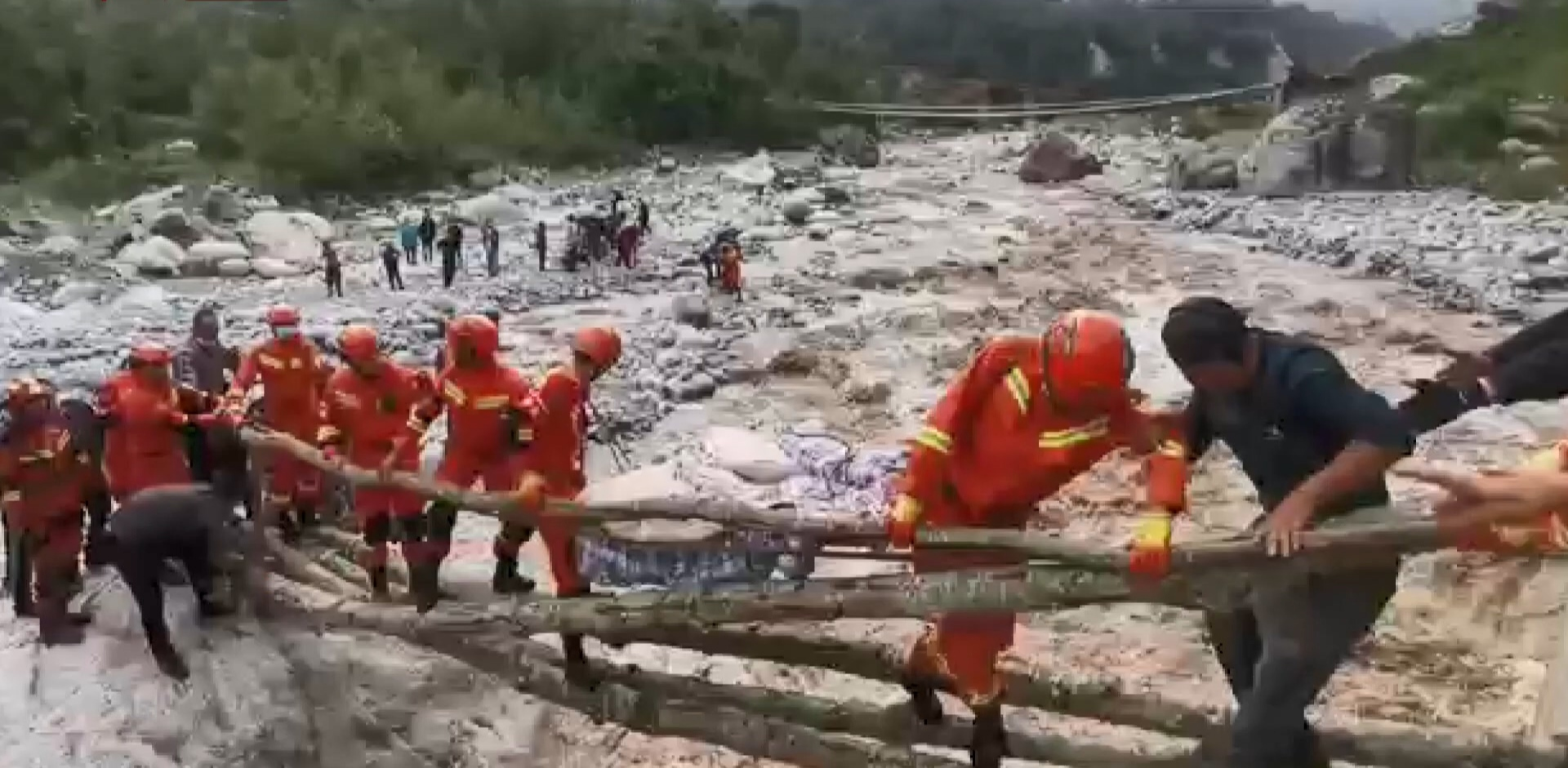
Rescue personnel evacuating villagers during the 2022 Luding earthquake.

Between its establishment in 2018 and 2023, the CFR responded to over 9 million calls, deploying personnel over 93.6 million times and deploying fire engines more than 16.7 million times, rescuing and evacuating over 2.95 million people.

== Line of duty deaths ==
As of 2023, over 165 firefighters of the CFR have died in the line of duty, with an additionally 1300 receiving duty related injuries.
