= Ministry of Public Security Active Service Forces =

Chinese law enforcement agency

Ministry of Public Security Active Service Forces 公安现役部队
- Cap insignia of the People's Armed Police

Agency overview
- Formed: June 19, 1982
- Dissolved: January 1, 2019
- Superseding agency: National Immigration Administration; Ministry of Public Security Special Service Bureau; China Fire and Rescue

Jurisdictional structure
- National agency: China
- Operations jurisdiction: China
- Governing body: Ministry of Public Security (China)
- General nature: Gendarmerie

Ministry of Public Security Active Services Forces (MPSASF; Chinese: 公安现役部队) was a term referring to three separate agencies under the command of the Ministry of Public Security however were composed of People's Armed Police personnel. Its name comes from the fact that since the personnel were considered PAP personnel, they were treated as active service military personnel. After the Deepening the reform of the Party and state institutions in 2018, Border Defense Corps and Guard Corps personnel became People's Police personnel, while the China Fire Services were merged with the People's Armed Police Forestry Corps and became the China Fire and Rescue, making the use of the term defunct.

== Border Defense Corps ==
Badge of the Border Defense Corps
- https://web.archive.org/web/20250318020410/https://www.xinhuanet.com/politics/2018-03/23/129835969_15217713315871n.jpg

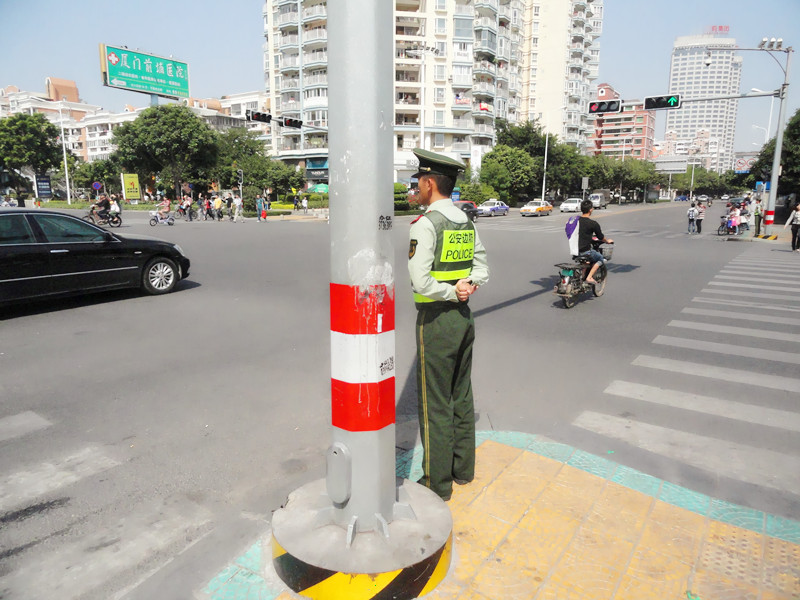
A Fujian Border Defense Corps officer in Xiamen

Prior to the 2018 People's Armed Police reform, the People's Armed Police Border Defense Corps (Chinese: 武警边防部队; pinyin: Wǔjǐng Biānfáng Bùdùi), more commonly known as the Ministry of Public Security Border Defense Corps (Chinese: 公安边防部队), was formerly China's primary border patrol agency. Its jobs were primarily intended to prevent drug trafficking, illegal immigration and smuggling. When it was active, The Border Defense Corps was under the command of the defunct Ministry of Public Security Border Control Department.

The People's Armed Police Border Defense corps was officially disbanded on December 25, 2018.

After the 2018 reform, the border defense corps was disbanded and transferred to the National immigration Administration, with its officers switching from being People's Armed Police to People's Police. From 1980 to the transferral of the Border Defense Corps, a total of 86 units and 519 personnel were awarded 1st class meritorious service medals, 411 units and 4614 personnel were awarded 2nd class meritorious service medals and 179 personnel were awarded martyr status.

=== History ===
The Tianjin Border Defense Corps can trace its lineage back to March 1949, when the Tianjin Pier Inspection group and Port inspection group were established.

The Border Defense Armed Police was established in November 1949 as part of the Ministry of Public Security.

In January 1980, the Border Defense Armed Police was renamed to the People's Armed Police Border Defense Corps.

On June 19, 1982, the Border Defense Corps was handed to the newly established People's Armed Police. In August 1985, the Border Defense Corps was moved under the control of the Ministry of Public Security, however it was continued to be composed of PAP personnel.

Out of six PAP personnel killed during the 1990 Barin uprising, four were Border Defense Corps personnel, including Lt. Col. Xu Xinjian.

Sixteen personnel of the Border Defense Corps were killed in the 2008 Kashgar attack.

Between September 18 and September 19, 2011, the Yadong Battalion and Yadong Border Checkpoint of the Border Defense Corps deployed 90 personnel, 11 vehicles and 30 tents to assist with disaster relief after the 2011 Sikkim Earthquake.

In the aftermath of the April 2015 Nepal earthquake 21 officers of the Gyirong Border Checkpoint had all access routes cut off for 12 days, where they remained to provide disaster relief and assisted in helicopter evacuations of civilians on the 28th of April. During the same earthquake, Private Zhang Gaoyong of the Nyalam Border Checkpoint Patrol company was heavily injured while attempting to use his body as a human shield against incoming rocks to protect a child. He later recovered from his injuries.

On January 29, 2016, after receiving shared intel from the HKPF of a panama-registered cargo ship named Fuyun smuggling frozen meat off the coast of Mirs Bay, the Shenzhen Border Defense Detachment Longgang Battalion deployed 2 speedboats and successfully intercepted the Fuyun, boarding and seizing the ship and bringing it to Nan'ao Subdistrict. A total of 13 foreign sailors from Indonesia and Myanmar, the Burmese captain and 7 Chinese sailors were arrested. A total of 71 boxes with 2219 tonnes of smuggled frozen meat was seized, with a total worth of approximately 200 million RMB. An investigation ruled that the smuggled meat was headed towards Shantou, and that much of the meat was passed its expiry date or had diseases; The seizing of the "Fuyun" was the largest seizure of smuggled meat by the Guangdong Border Defense Corps in 10 years.

On January 16, 2017, the 1st Mobile Company, Honghe Border Defense Corps was deployed to fight bandits engaging in extortion along the highway between Mengzi and Hekou, resulting in a shootout where Border Defense PFC Zhang Hao was shot multiple times. All bandits were apprehended, along with two improvised firearms and three nail guns confiscated.

In 2018 when the Border Defense Corps was disbanded, 20 units and 31 personnel of the Guangdong Border Defense Corps received honorary titles, along with 21 units and 82 personnel receiving 1st Class Meritorious Service Medals and 18 personnel achieving martyr status.

==== Inter-agency cooperation ====
The Border Defense Corps previously had intel sharing with local Economic Crimes Investigation units, the HKPF, the General Administration of Customs Anti-Smuggling Bureau along with local Public Security Bureau Public Order units.

On September 23, 2009, the Shenzhen Border Defense Detachment conducted a joint anti-hijacking exercise with the HKPF. In the process, a crew member from the Shenzhen Border Defense Detachment fell into the water. Border Defense officers Liu Cheng, Shen Weixiong and Qiu Wenliang attempted to save the crew member which resulted in the 3 border defense officers being killed by the propeller. Qiu's body was found 3 days later, and on September 28 all 3 officers were given Martyr status.

===== International cooperation =====
The Border Defense Corps has also been deployed in UN Peacekeeping operations. Between 2006 and 2018, the Border Defense Corps was deployed in peacekeeping 10 times, with a total of 1325 officers being deployed for peacekeeping.

On November 27–28, 2011, the Guangxi Border Defense Corps had a meeting and signed a treaty with the Vietnam Border Guard's Lạng Sơn, Cao Bằng and Quảng Ninh provincial commands regarding cooperation against international crime and illegally crossing borders.

==== War on drugs in the China-Myanmar border by the Border Defense Corps ====
The Border Defense Corps has a history of intercepting armed incursions by drug traffickers on the China-Myanmar border, especially due to smuggling routes across the Shweli River. On August 2, 1997, Border Defense officer Corporal Yin Mingzhi was stabbed by a drug trafficker during an undercover sting operation in Longchuan County near the China-Myanmar Border, dying of his wounds a day later.

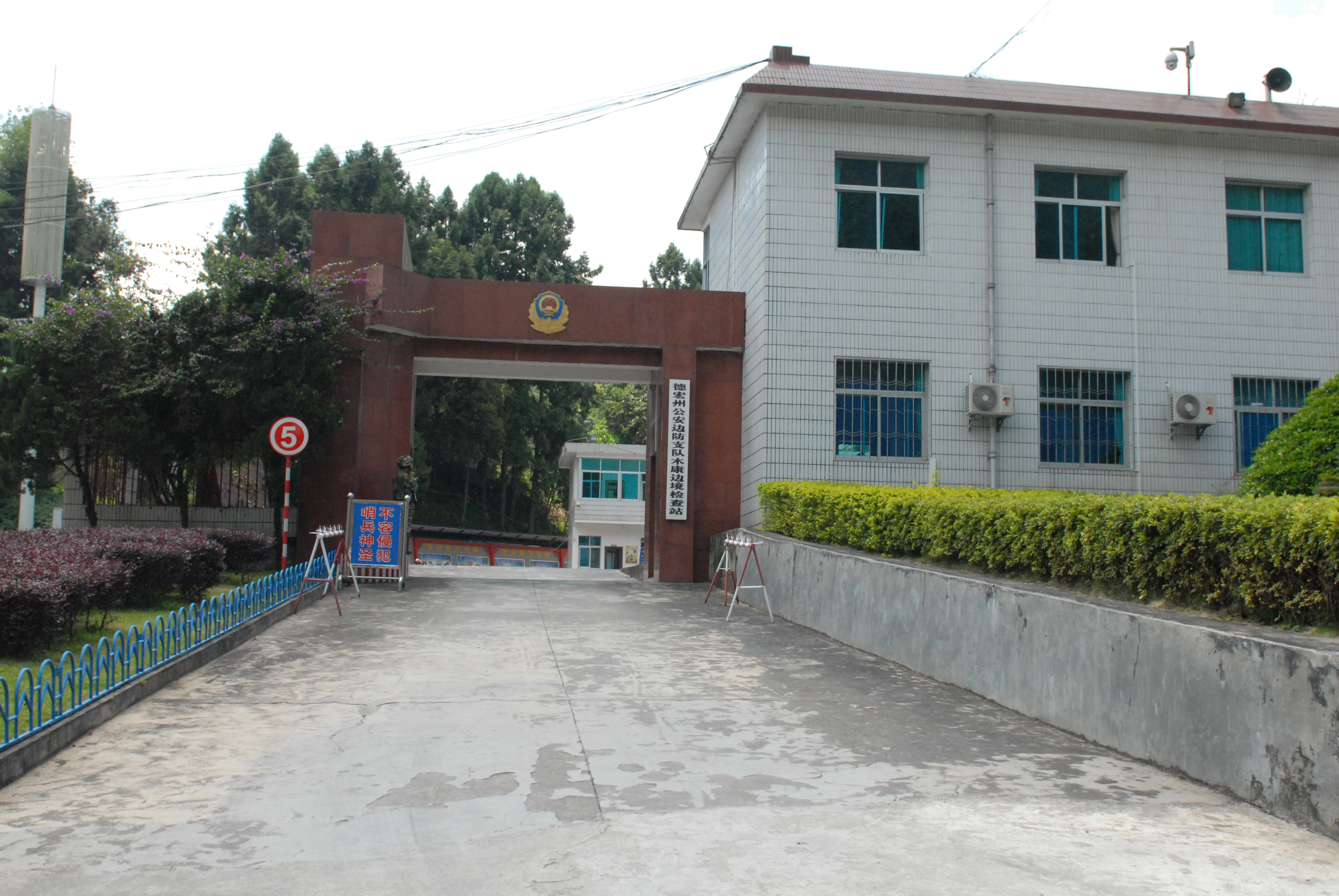
Mukang Border Checkpoint

The Dehong Border Defense detachment's Mukang Border Checkpoint (木康边境检查站) on G320 between Dehong and Baoshan, established in 1978, is one of the most decorated Chinese border checkpoints, receiving 7 Meritorious Service medals, 8 2nd class Meritorious Service medals and 9 3rd class meritorious service medals. On August 3, 2001, it was given the honorary title of "Anti-Narcotics Pioneer checkpoint" by the State council due to seizing some of the most drugs out of all Chinese border checkpoints. In 2018, it was handed to the NIA; between 2001 and 2021, the checkpoint handled over 8000 narcotics cases and 926 smuggling cases, arrested over 5500 suspects, and seizing a total of over 5.26 tonnes of drugs, 650 tonnes of improvised drug injection needles, 12 firearms, 170 rounds of ammunition and 59.22 million RMB of smuggled goods.

On March 25, 2007, officers of the Border Defense Corps were ambushed by ten armed drug traffickers with sub-machine guns and grenades, killing officers 2nd Lieutenant Gan Zurong, Major Bai Jiangang and Captain Xu Shengqian.

On August 22, 2011, and October 22, 2011, Border Defense Corps K9 Handler Private Yao Yuanjun and Political Commissar Major Chen Shihua drowned while engaging in melee fighting with drug traffickers in separate incidents, respectively. Private Yao Yuanjun's K9 "Big Wolf" became a center of a lot of attention on Chinese Social Media after he was filmed on national TV wandering around training grounds, unaware his handler had died.

The Border Defense Coast Guard's badge

=== Organization ===
Each coastal/border province-level subdivision or direct-administered municipality would have had a border defense Corps, every border/coastal prefecture-level division would have a border defense detachment, every border/coastal county level subdivision would have a border defense battalion; Township level subdivisions would each have a border defense police station. Prior to the establishment of the CCG in 2013, there would also be Border Defense Corps Coast Guard flotillas and squadrons. The Border Defense Corps additionally operated checkpoints on roads heading towards border crossings along with border checkpoints.

- Shanghai Border Defense Corps - Merged with Shanghai Municipal Public Security Bureau Ports Subbureau to become the Shanghai Municipal Public Security Bureau Border Defense and Ports subbureau
- Tianjin Border Defense Corps - Now Tianjin General Station of Exit and Entry Frontier inspection
- Chongqing Border Defense Corps - Now Chongqing General Station of Exit and Entry Frontier Inspection
- Hebei Border Defense Corps - Now Hebei General Station of Exit and Entry Frontier Inspection
- Shanxi Border Defense Corps - Now Shanxi General Station of Exit and Entry Frontier Inspection
- Jilin Border Defense Corps - Now Jilin General Station of Exit and Entry Frontier Inspection
- Liaoning Border Defense Corps - Now Liaoning General Station of Exit and Entry Frontier Inspection
- Heilongjiang Border Defense Corps - Now Heilongjiang General Station of Exit and Entry Frontier Inspection
- Shaanxi Border Defense Corps - Now Shaanxi General Station of Exit and Entry Frontier Inspection
- Gansu Border Defense Corps - Now Gansu General Station of Exit and Entry Frontier Inspection
- Qinghai Border Defense Corps - Now Qinghai General Station of Exit and Entry Frontier Inspection
- Shandong Border Defense Corps - Now Shandong General Station of Exit and Entry Frontier Inspection
- Fujian Border Defense Corps - Now Xiamen Entry and Exit Border Inspection Station
- Zhejiang Border Defense Corps - Now Zhejiang General Station of Exit and Entry Frontier Inspection
- Henan Border Defense Corps - Now Henan General Station of Exit and Entry Frontier Inspection
- Hubei Border Defense Corps - Now Hubei General Station of Exit and Entry Frontier Inspection
- Hunan Border Defense Corps - Now Hunan General Station of Exit and Entry Frontier Inspection
- Jiangxi Border Defense Corps - Now Jiangxi General Station of Exit and Entry Frontier Inspection
- Jiangsu Border Defense Corps - Now Jiangsu General Station of Exit and Entry Frontier Inspection
- Anhui Border Defense Corps - Now Anhui General Station of Exit and Entry Frontier Inspection
- Guangdong Border Defense Corps - Now Guangzhou General Station of Exit and Entry Frontier Inspection
- Hainan Border Defense Corps - Now Hainan General Station of Exit and Entry Frontier Inspection
- Sichuan Border Defense Corps - Now Sichuan General Station of Exit and Entry Frontier Inspection
- Guizhou Border Defense Corps - Now Guizhou General Station of Exit and Entry Frontier Inspection
- Yunnan Border Defense Corps - Now Yunnan General Station of Exit and Entry Frontier Inspection
- Inner Mongolia Border Defense Corps - Now Inner Mongolia General Station of Exit and Entry Frontier Inspection
- Xinjiang Border Defense Corps - Now Xinjiang General Station of Exit and Entry Frontier Inspection
- Ningxia Border Defense Corps - Now Ningxia General Station of Exit and Entry Frontier Inspection
- Guangxi Border Defense Corps - Now Guangxi General Station of Exit and Entry Frontier Inspection
- Tibet Border Defense Corps - Now Tibet General Station of Exit and Entry Frontier Inspection

=== Special operations units ===
Badge of the Snowy Eagle Female Special Service team
- https://photo.81.cn/pla/2015-03/19/content_6398233_5.htm

==== Snowy Eagle Female Special Service team ====
Flag of the Snowy Eagle Female Special Service team
- https://photo.81.cn/pla/2015-03/19/content_6398233_8.htm

In April 2012, the Xinjiang Border Defense Corps Female Special Service team (新疆公安边防总队女子特勤分队) was founded. In March 2015 it was renamed to the "Snowy Eagle Female Special Service team" (雪鹰女子特勤分队) at the Xinjiang Border Corps Training Base. At its founding in 2012, it only had 6 members, and by March 2015 it had 34 members. It assisted in security at the China Eurasia Expo multiple times.

==== Maritime Special Service team ====
The Shenzhen Border Defense Detachment operated the Maritime Special Service Team (Nicknamed "Maritime Jiaolongs"), a police tactical unit which is dedicated to maritime anti-terrorism, search and rescue, combat diving and VBSS.

It was established on August 18, 2008, and initially consisted of only 20+ members. The unit often conducts joint exercises with the HKPF Marine Region, and also received training from the PLA Naval Submarine Academy.

===== Training =====
The Maritime Special Service Team's training requirements include swimming 3000 meters with full gear, running 5000 meters, 200 push ups, sit ups and squats.

== Guard Corps ==
Badge of the Guard Corps
- http://www.xinhuanet.com/politics/2018-03/23/129835969_15217713324921n.jpg

Prior to the 2018 reform, the Ministry of Public Security Guard Corps (Chinese: 公安警卫部队), officially known as the People's Armed Police Guard Corps (Chinese: 武警警卫部队) was a branch of the People's Armed Police. After the 2018 reform, the Guard Corps were disbanded and re-organized into the Ministry of Public Security Special Service Bureau on January 1, 2019. Provincial Guard Corps units were also renamed to Guard Bureaus of provincial Public Security Departments. Similar to the Border Defense Corps and the China Fire Services, the Guard Corps were under the command of the Ministry of Public Security Guards Bureau (now the Special Service Bureau) however its personnel were part of the PAP.

The Guard Corps were responsible for roles such as VIP protection, protecting important conferences along with provincial government leaders.

=== History ===
Guard Corps personnel became part of the PAP on March 23, 1984.

The Guard Corps were responsible for protecting the World Conference on Women 1995, the handover of Hong Kong, the 50th anniversary of the People's Republic of China, the Handover of Macau, the 2006 FOCAC summit, the 2008 Beijing Olympics, 60th anniversary of the People's Republic of China, the 18th National Congress of the Chinese Communist Party, APEC China 2014, the 2015 China Victory Day Parade, the 2016 G20 Hangzhou summit and the 19th National Congress of the Chinese Communist Party.

=== Organization ===
Before 2018, each province had its own Guard Corps Corps, which was under the Guards Bureau of the provincial Public Security Department. This was converted into Provincial Special Service Bureaus under the Provincial Public Security Department

== China Fire Services ==
Badge of the China Fire Services

The China Fire Services (CFS), officially known as the Ministry of Public Security Firefighting Corps (公安消防部队) or the People's Armed Police Firefighting Corps (武警消防部队) in Chinese was China's primary firefighting agency prior to the 2018 reforms. After 2018, the China Fire Services was merged with the People's Armed Police Forestry Corps to form the National Fire and Rescue Administration. China Fire Services personnel were part of PAP however the China Fire Services were organizationally speaking of the now defunct Ministry of Public Security Firefighting Bureau. On October 10, 2018, the CFS was disbanded.

=== History ===
20 CFS firefighters died putting out the 2003 Hengyang fire.

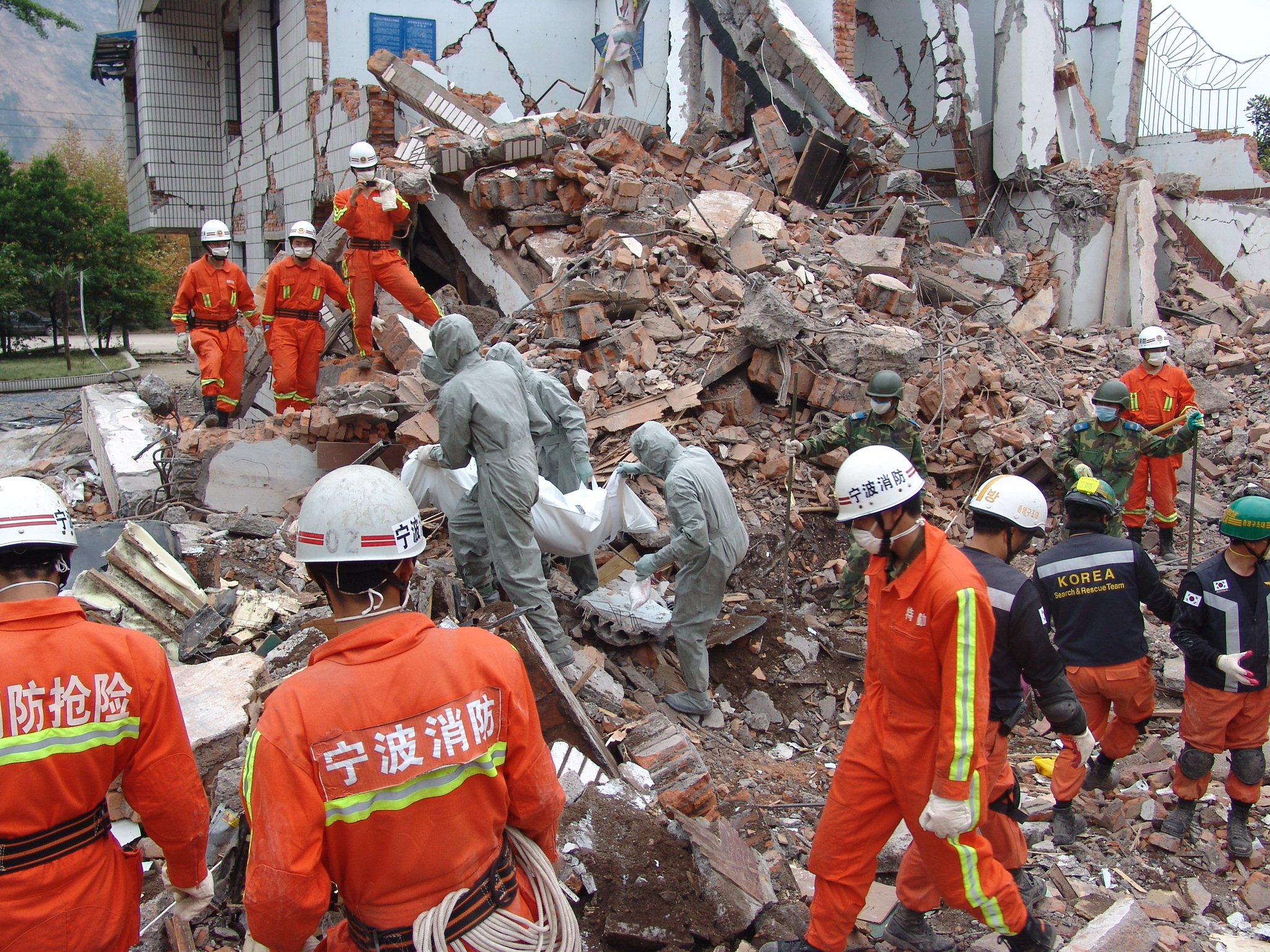
China Fire Services Ningbo Fire Department firefighters conducting disaster relief after the 2008 Sichuan Earthquake

The China Fire Services were the first responders to the 2008 Sichuan Earthquake. By May 18, 2008, the China Fire Services rescued 5796 people stuck under rubble, provided aid to 259 injured people, recovered the bodies of 639 bodies, provided relief to 3759 people who were stuck and evacuated 47152 more people and transported 705.3 tonnes of aid.

On June 27, 2012, in the China Fire Services Wuhai Fire Department's Wuda District 2nd Company, 8 older firefighters continuously beat and verbally abused 5 new firefighters as part of a hazing ritual. The footage was leaked onto Weibo on December 9, 2013, sparking public outrage; this incident is often referred to as the 2013 Wuhai firefighter hazing incident.

On January 2, 2015, 5 firefighters of the China Fire Services Harbin Fire Department died during the 2015 Harbin Warehouse Fire.

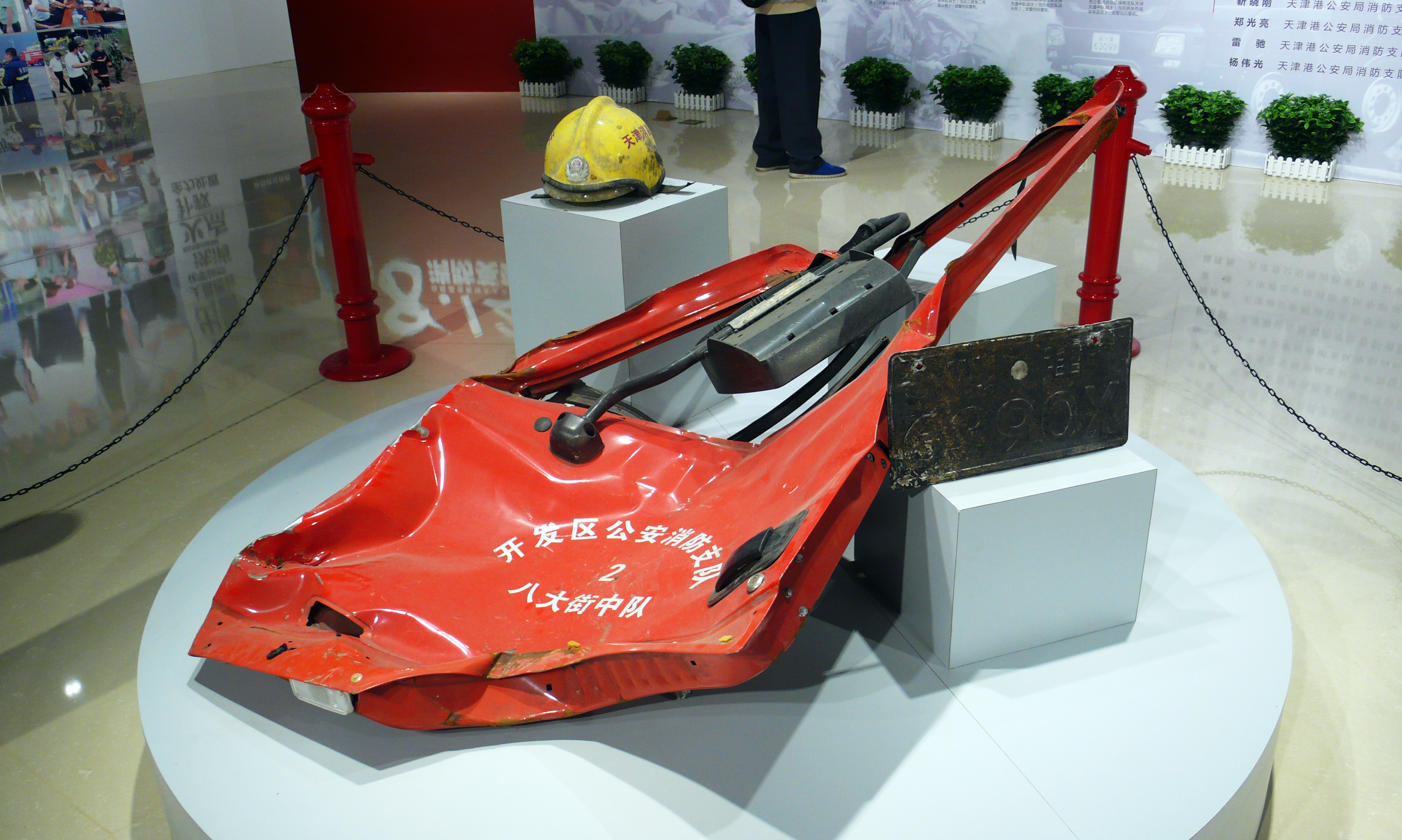
Remains of a fire truck of the China Fire Services damaged in the 2015 Tianjin Explosion in the China Fire Museum

During the 2015 Tianjin explosions on August 12, 2015, the China Fire Services Tianjin Fire Department lost a total of 24 firefighters (dead or presumed dead) and had 69 more injured.

=== Organization ===
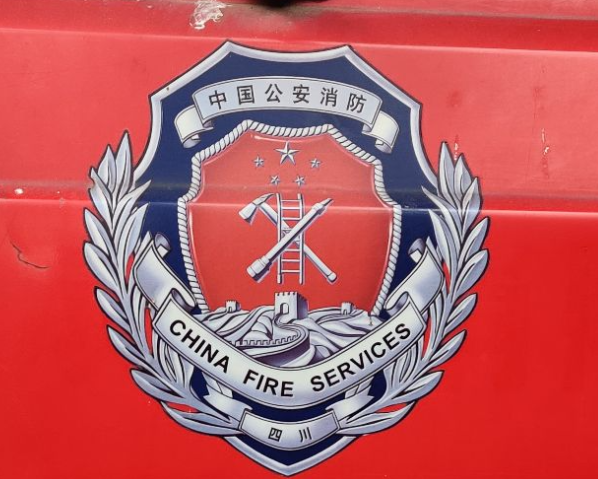
Badge of the China Fire Services Sichuan Fire Department

- China Fire Services Beijing Fire Department (Now Beijing Fire and Rescue)
- China Fire Services Shanghai Fire Department (Now Shanghai Fire and Rescue)
- China Fire Services Tianjin Fire Department (Now Tianjin Fire and Rescue)
- China Fire Services Chongqing Fire Department (Now Chongqing Fire and Rescue)
- China Fire Services Hebei Fire Department (Now Hebei Provincial Fire and Rescue Department)
- China Fire Services Shanxi Fire Department (Now Shanxi Provincial Fire and Rescue Department)
- China Fire Services Jilin Fire Department (Now Jilin Provincial Fire and Rescue Department)
- China Fire Services Liaoning Fire Department (Now Liaoning Provincial Fire and Rescue Department)
- China Fire Services Heilongjiang Fire Department (Now Heilongjiang Provincial Fire and Rescue Department)
- China Fire Services Shaanxi Fire Department (Now Shaanxi Provincial Fire and Rescue Department)
- China Fire Services Gansu Fire Department (Now Gansu Provincial Fire and Rescue Department)
- China Fire Services Qinghai Fire Department (Now Qinghai Provincial Fire and Rescue Department)
- China Fire Services Shandong Fire Department (Now Shandong Provincial Fire and Rescue Department)
- China Fire Services Fujian Fire Department (Now Fujian Provincial Fire and Rescue Department)
- China Fire Services Zhejiang Fire Department (Now Zhejiang Provincial Fire and Rescue Department)
- China Fire Services Henan Fire Department (Now Henan Provincial Fire and Rescue Department)
- China Fire Services Hubei Fire Department (Now Hubei Provincial Fire and Rescue Department)
- China Fire Services Hunan Fire Department (Now Hunan Provincial Fire and Rescue Department)
- China Fire Services Jiangxi Fire Department (Now Jiangxi Provincial Fire and Rescue Department)
- China Fire Services Jiangsu Fire Department (Now Jiangsu Provincial Fire and Rescue Department)
- China Fire Services Anhui Fire Department (Now Anhui Provincial Fire and Rescue Department)
- China Fire Services Guangdong Fire Department (Now Guangdong Provincial Fire and Rescue Department)
- China Fire Services Hainan Fire Department (Now Hainan Provincial Fire and Rescue Department)
- China Fire Services Sichuan Fire Department (Now Sichuan Provincial Fire and Rescue Department)
- China Fire Services Guizhou Fire Department (Now Guizhou Provincial Fire and Rescue Department)
- China Fire Services Yunnan Fire Department (Now Yunnan Provincial Fire and Rescue Department)
- China Fire Services Inner Mongolia Fire Department (Now Inner Mongolia Autonomous Region Fire and Rescue Department)
- China Fire Services Xinjiang Fire Department (Now Xinjiang Autonomous Region Fire and Rescue Department)
- China Fire Services Ningxia Fire Department (Now Ningxia Autonomous Region Fire and Rescue Department)
- China Fire Services Guangxi Fire Department (Now Guangxi Autonomous Region Fire and Rescue Department)
- China Fire Services Tibet Fire Department (Now Tibet Autonomous Region Fire and Rescue Department)
- China Fire Services Officer training base (Now National Fire and Rescue Administration Tianjin Training Corps)
- China Fire Services Kunming Command Academy (Now National Fire and Rescue Administration Kunming Training Corps)
- China Fire Services Nanjing Command Academy (Now National Fire and Rescue Administration Nanjing Training Corps)

== Equipment ==
=== Firearms/Individual weapons ===
- Type 81 assault rifle - Used by Border Defense Corps
- QBZ-95 - Used by Border Defense Corps
- Type 79 submachine gun - Used by Border Defense Corps
- Crossbows - Used by Border Defense Corps
- Type 74 flamethrower - Used by Border Defense Corps

=== Vehicles ===
- Changfeng Liebao patrol car- Used by Border Defense Corps
- ZFB-05 - Used by Border Defense Corps Peacekeepers
- Dongfeng EQ2050 - Used by Border Defense Corps Peacekeepers
- Audi A6 C6 - seen in use in Guard Corps
- MAN CLA - seen in use with Guard Corps
- Volkswagen Santana - seen in use as a fire marshal vehicle of the China Fire Services
- Isuzu Forward - seen in use with China Fire Services
- Maxus G10 - used by China Fire Services as VIP transport
- Dongfeng EQ140 - used by China Fire Services
- Dongfeng EQ2102 - used by China Fire Services
- HOWO fire trucks - used by China Fire Services
- Mercedes-Benz Actros - used by China Fire services

=== Helicopters ===
- Kamov Ka-32 - used by the China Fire Services Shanghai Fire Department, transferred to the Shanghai Municipal Public Security Bureau Police Aviation Force

=== Vessels ===
- Haijing 1001 cutter - part of the Border Defense Corps Shanghai Corps Coast Guard Flotilla, transferred to China Coast Guard
- Haijing 015 cutter - part of the Border Defense Coast guard
- Hufengxiao 01 fireboat - part of the China Fire Services Shanghai Fire Department Jinshan Fire Department
- Gongbian 44101 - Part of Shenzhen Border Defense Detachment
- Gongbian 44102 - Part of Shenzhen Border Defense Detachment
- Gongbian 44104 - Part of Shenzhen Border Defense Detachment
- Gongbian 44110 - Part of Shenzhen Border Defense Detachment
- Gongbian 44113 - Part of Shenzhen Border Defense Detachment
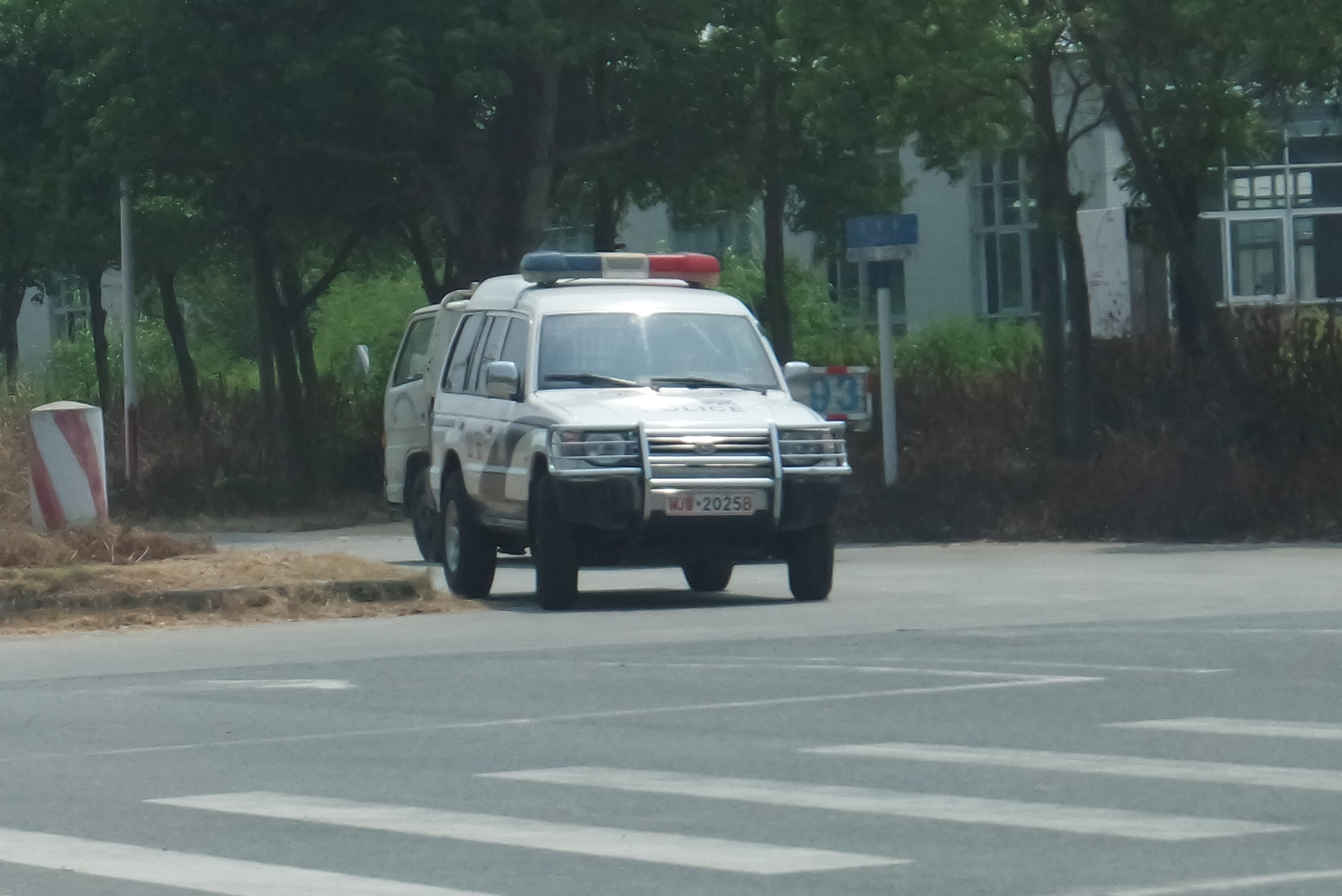
Border Defense Corps Foshan Detachment Chengfeng Liebao

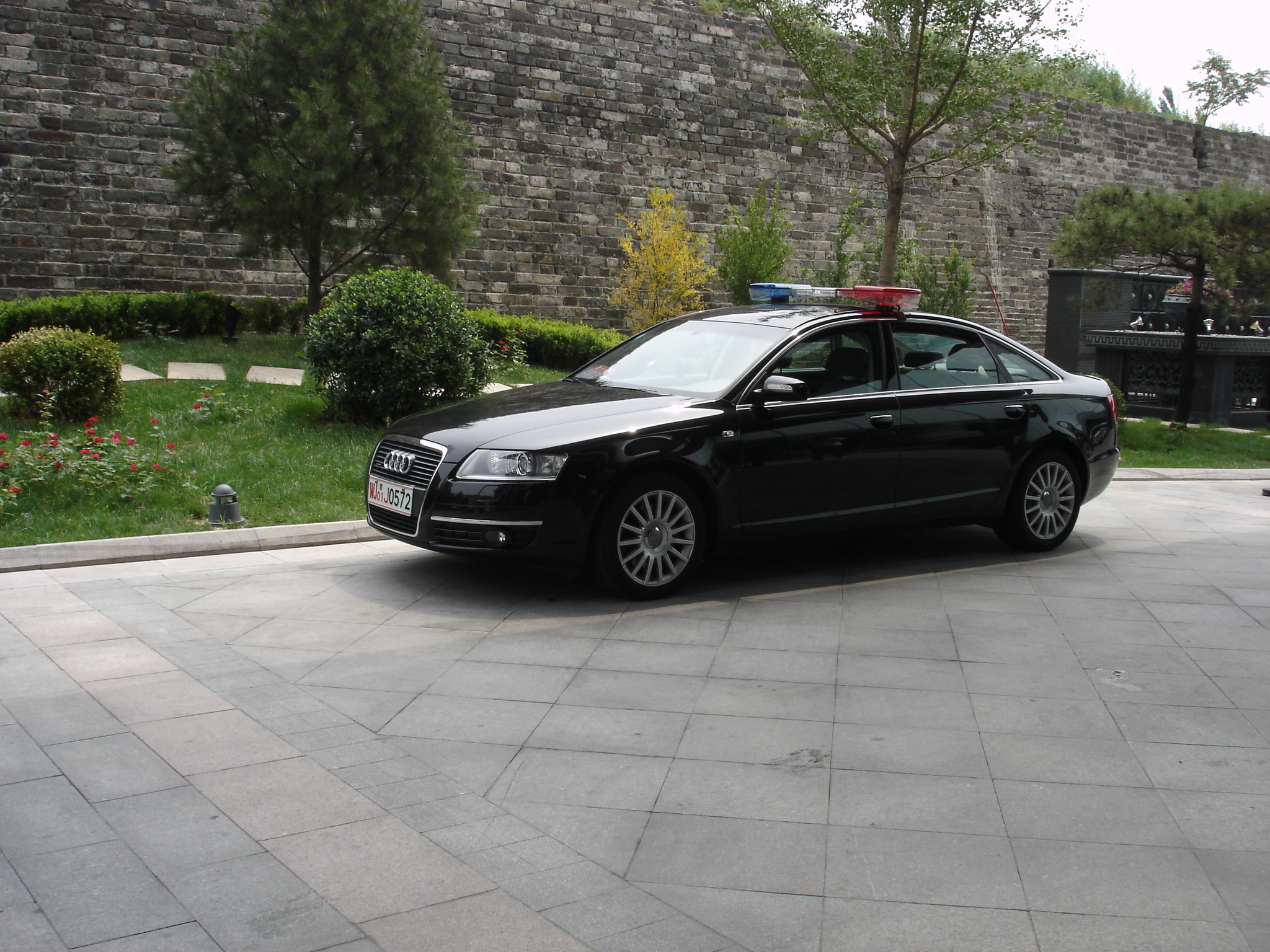
Audi A6 C6 of the Guard Corps

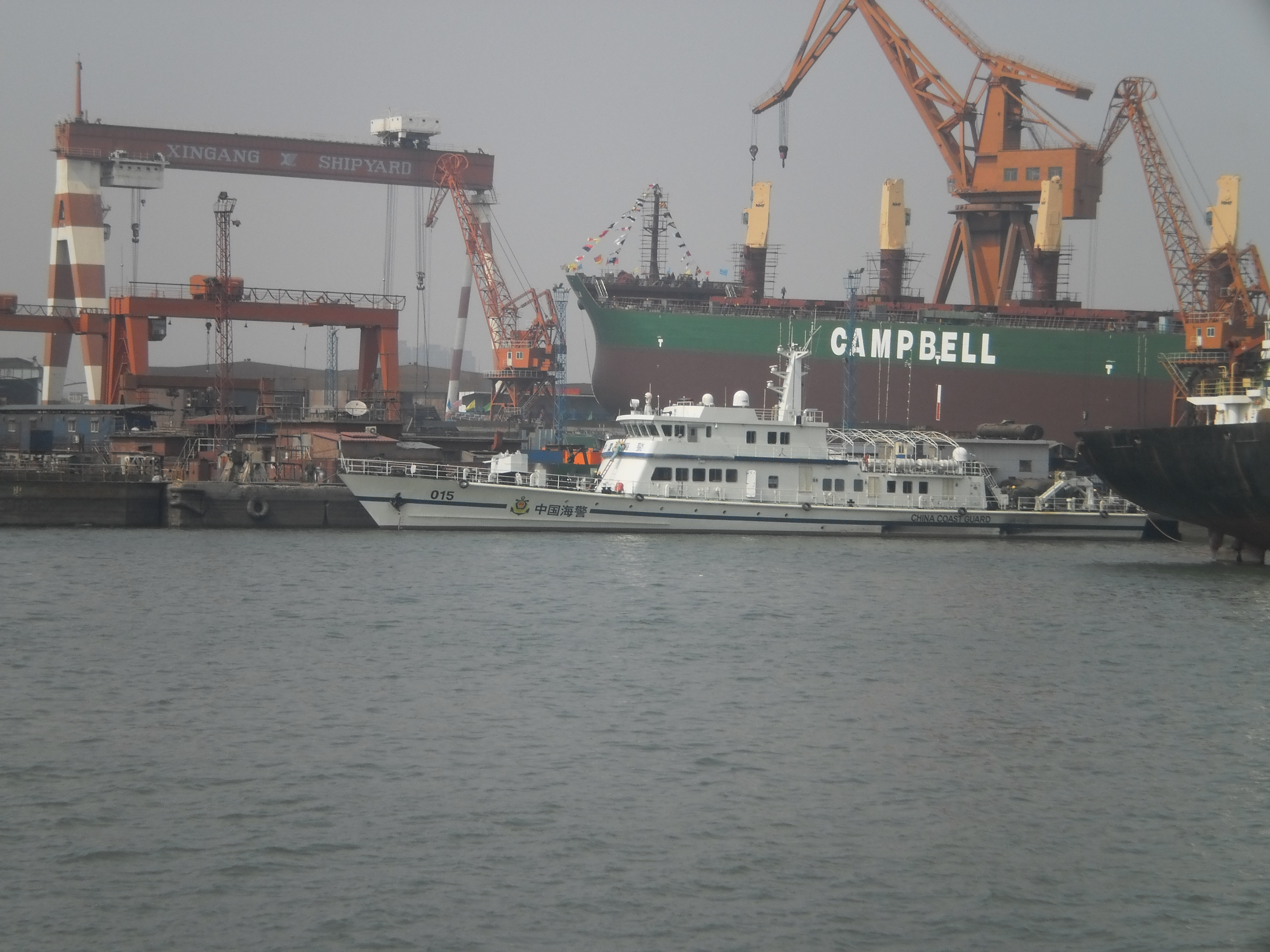
Border Defense Coast Guard Haijing 015

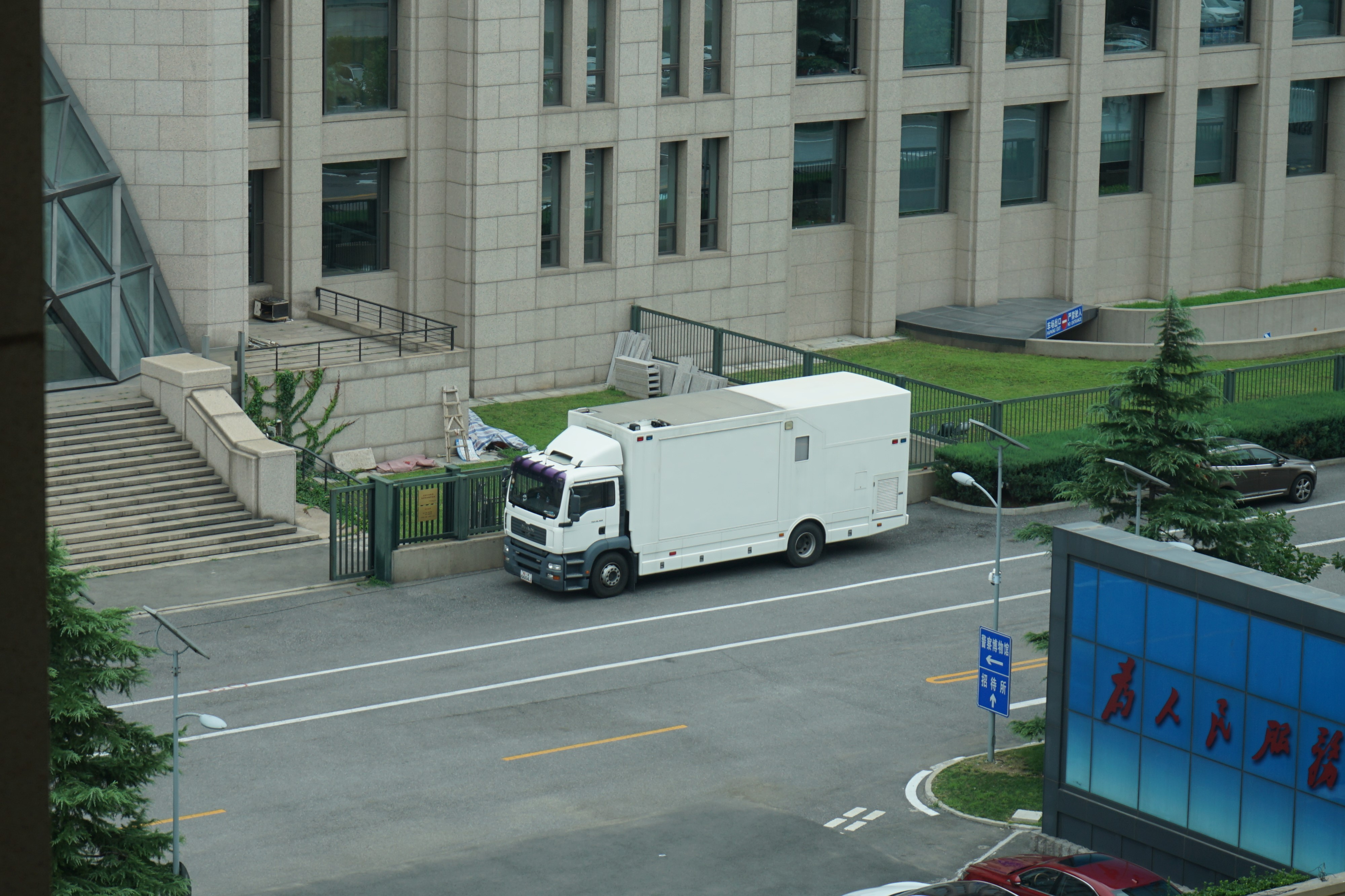
Guard Corps Beijing Corps MAN CLA

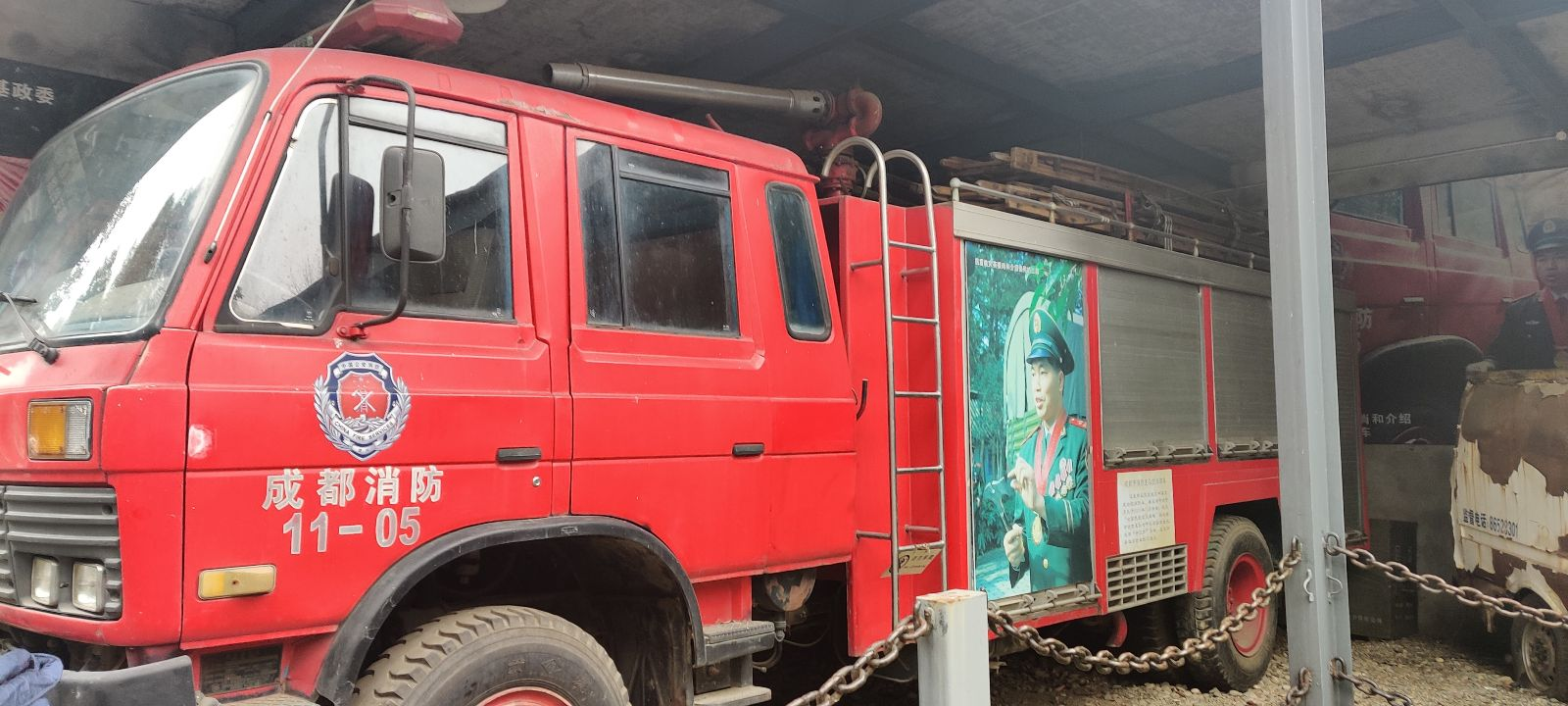
A former China Fire Services Chengdu Fire Department Dongfeng EQ2102 in the Jianchuan Museum Cluster 2008 Earthquake exhibit

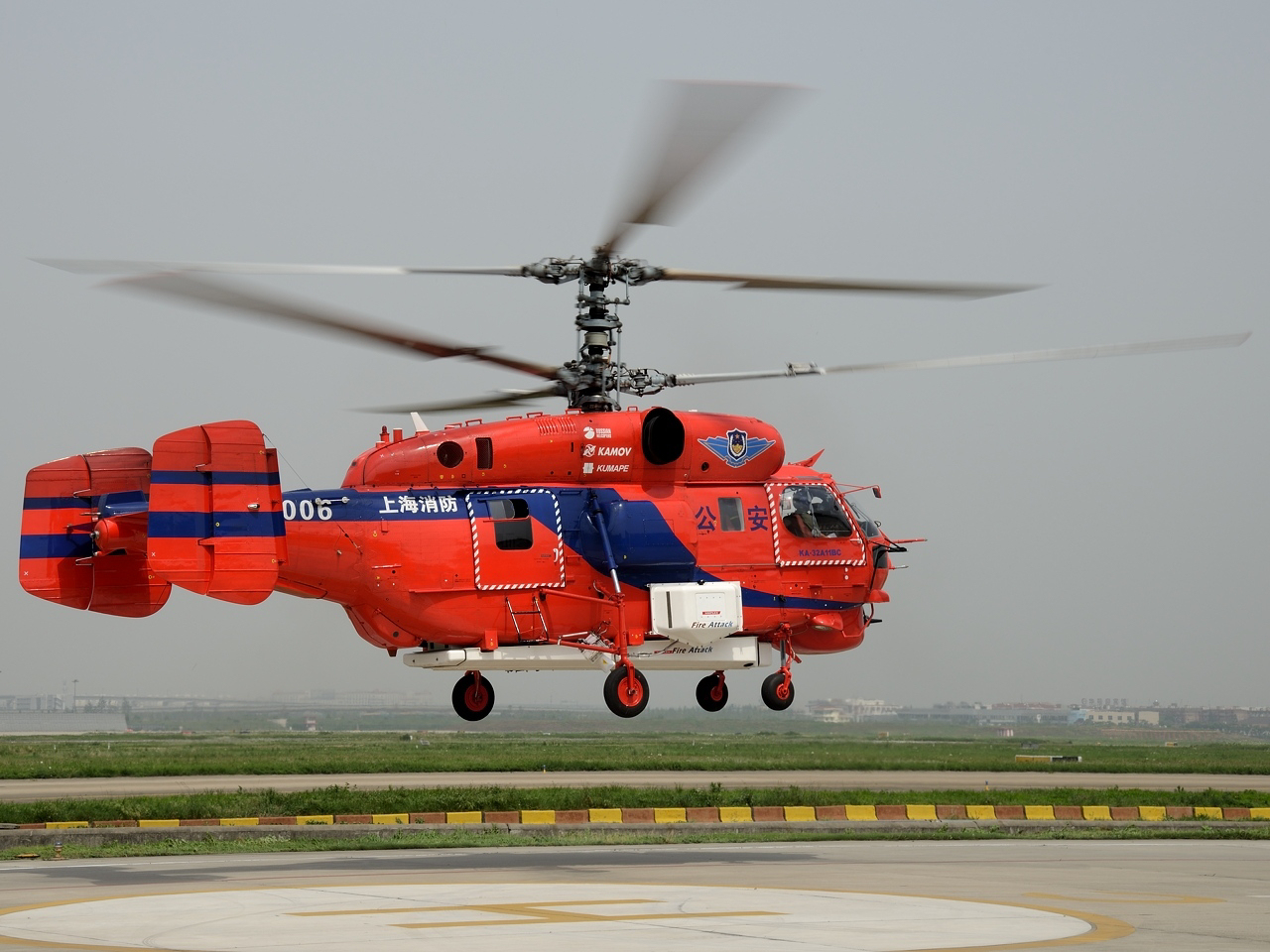
China Fire Services Shanghai Fire Department Ka-32

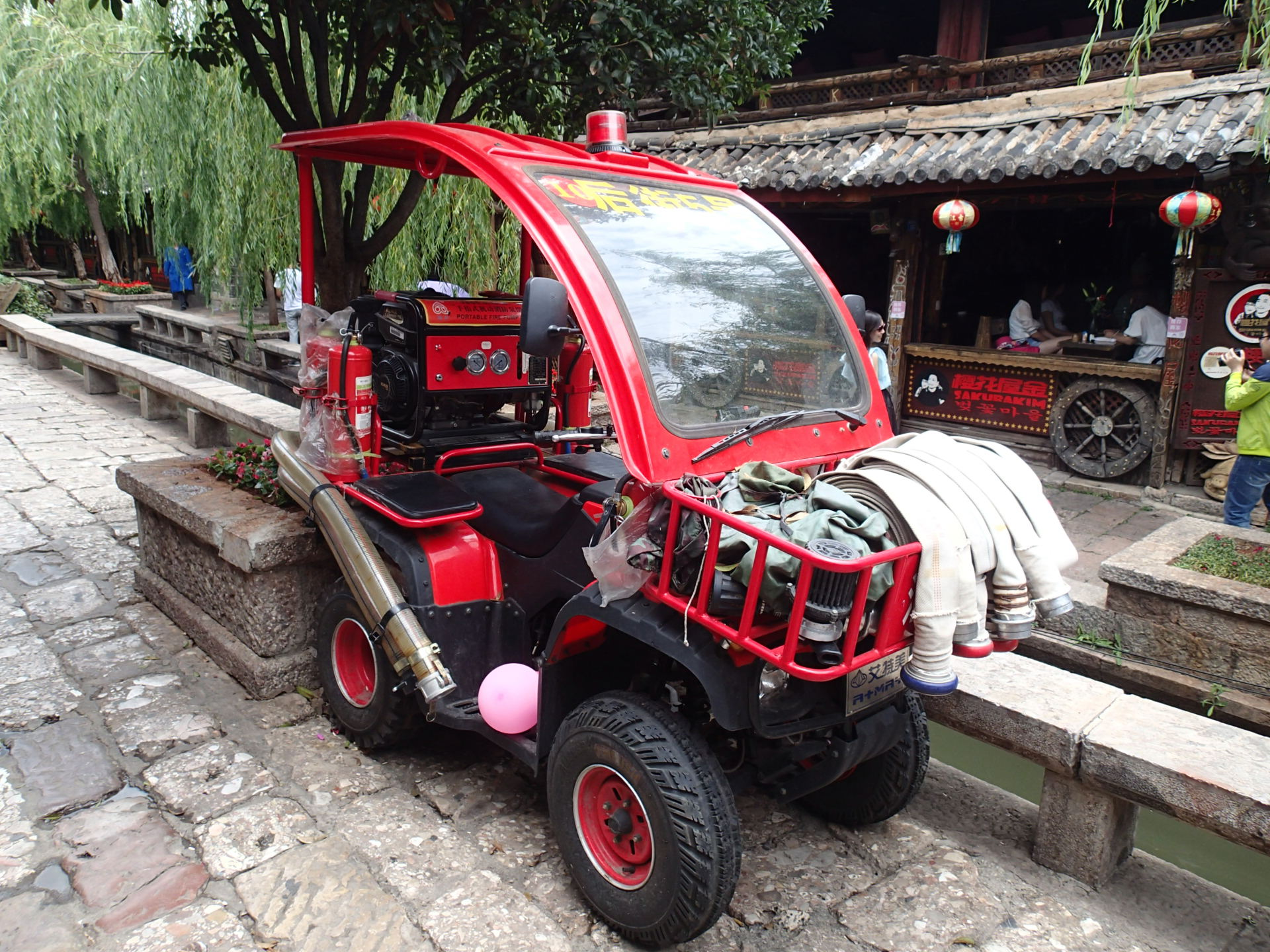
A former China Fire Services Lijiang Fire Department ATV

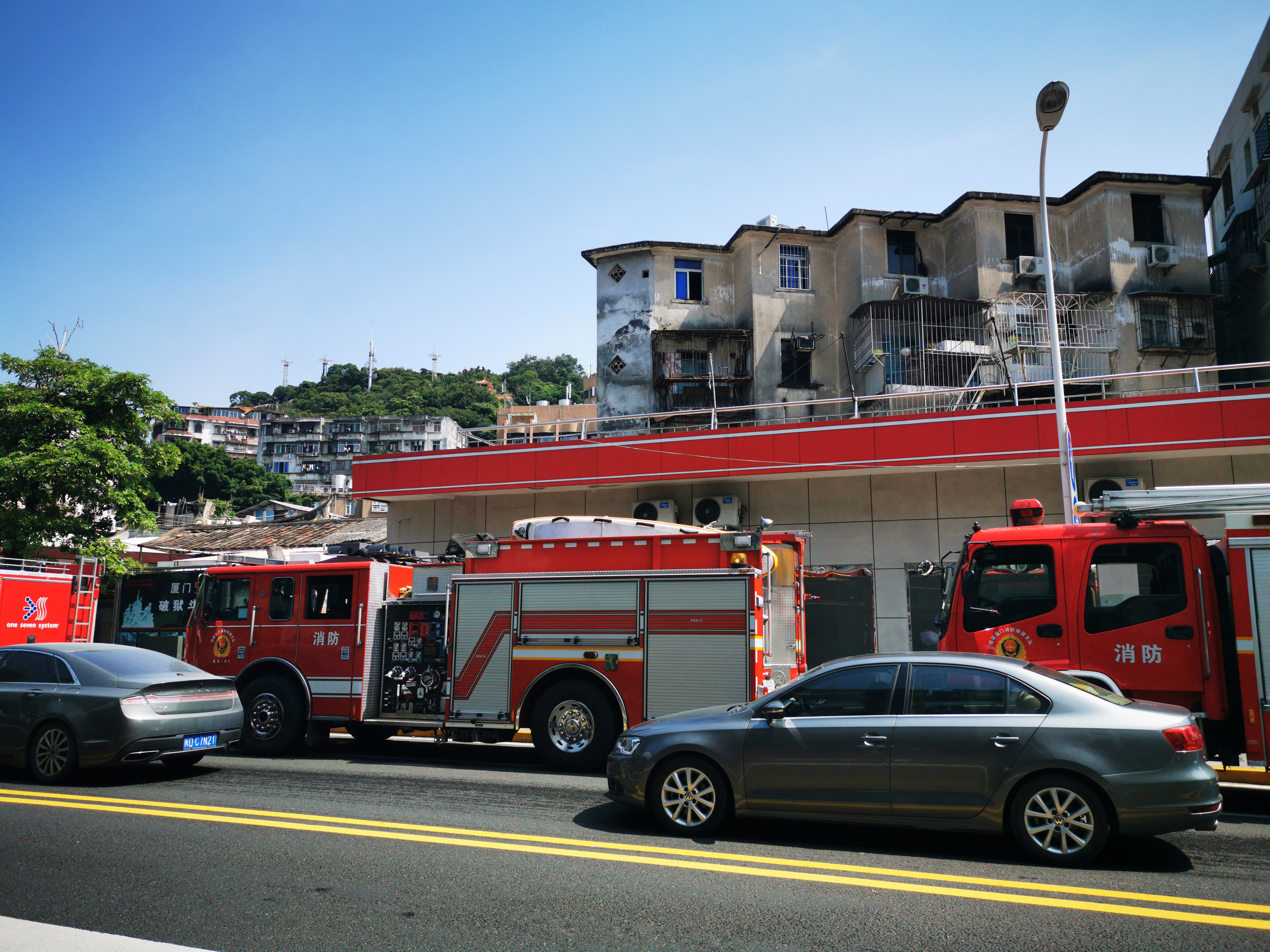
Fire trucks of the former China Fire Services Xiamen Fire Department

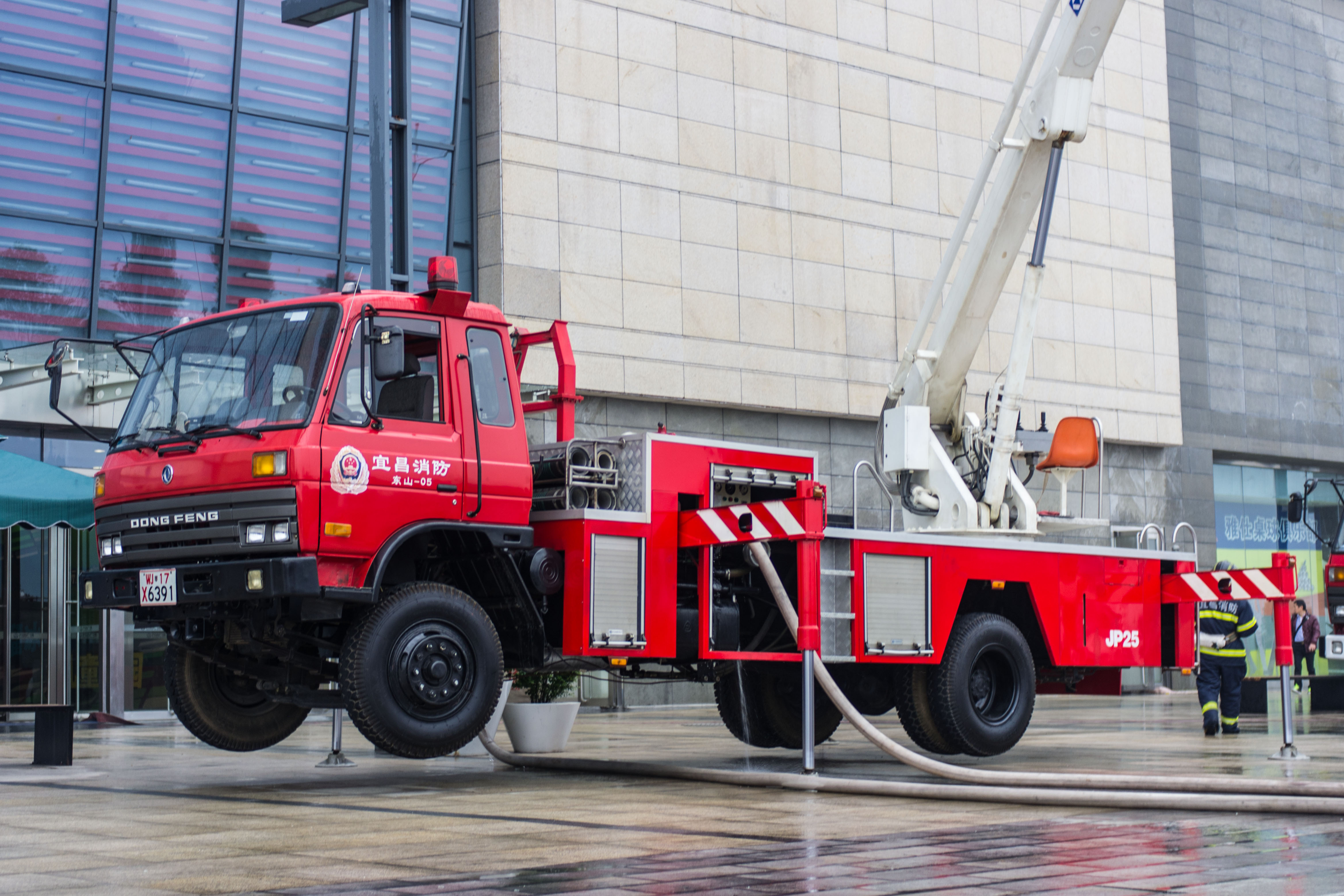
A former China Fire Services Yichang Fire Department Dongfeng EQ2102 ladder truck

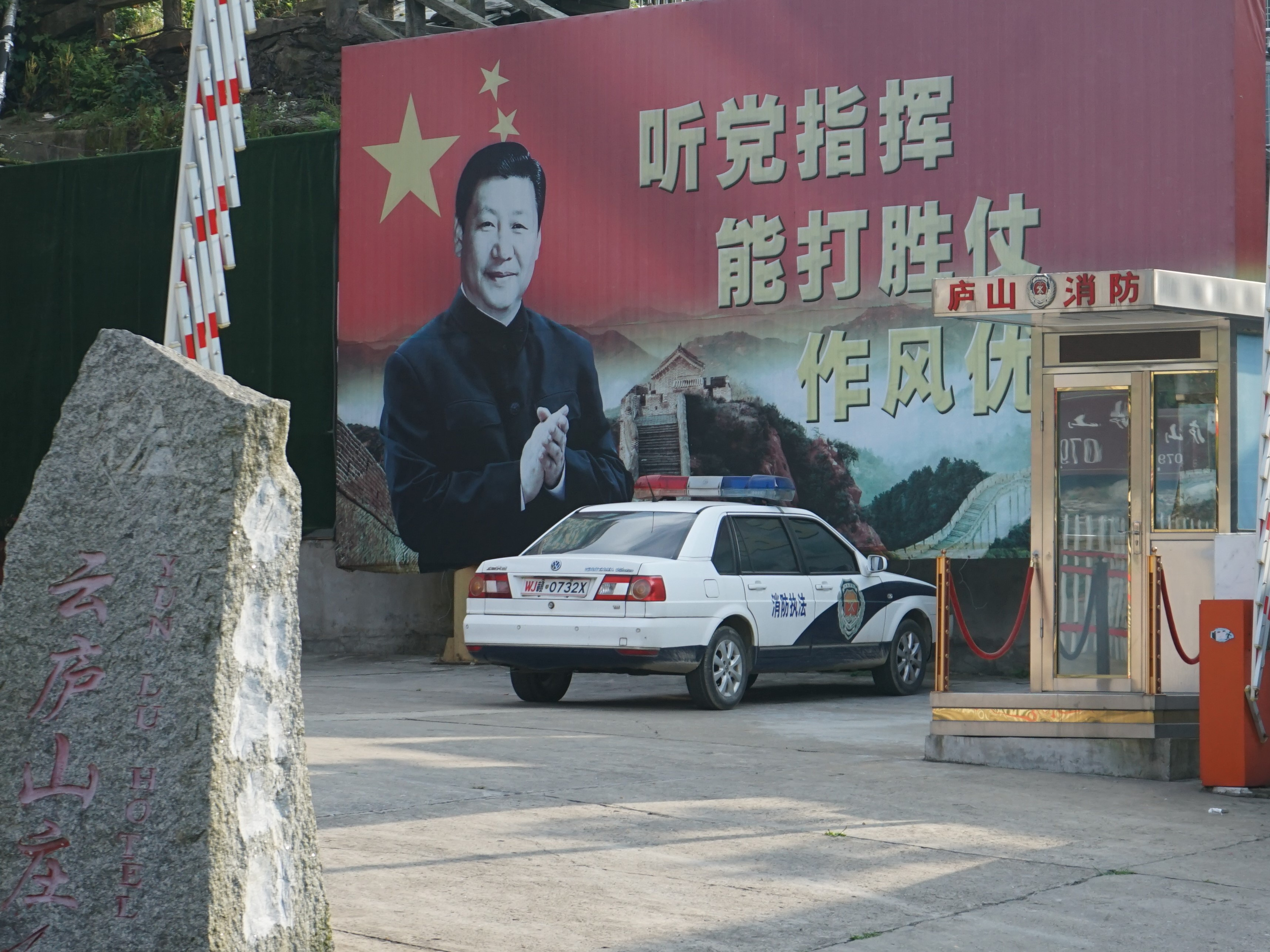
China Fire Services Jiujiang Fire Department Volkswagen Santana fire marshal vehicle

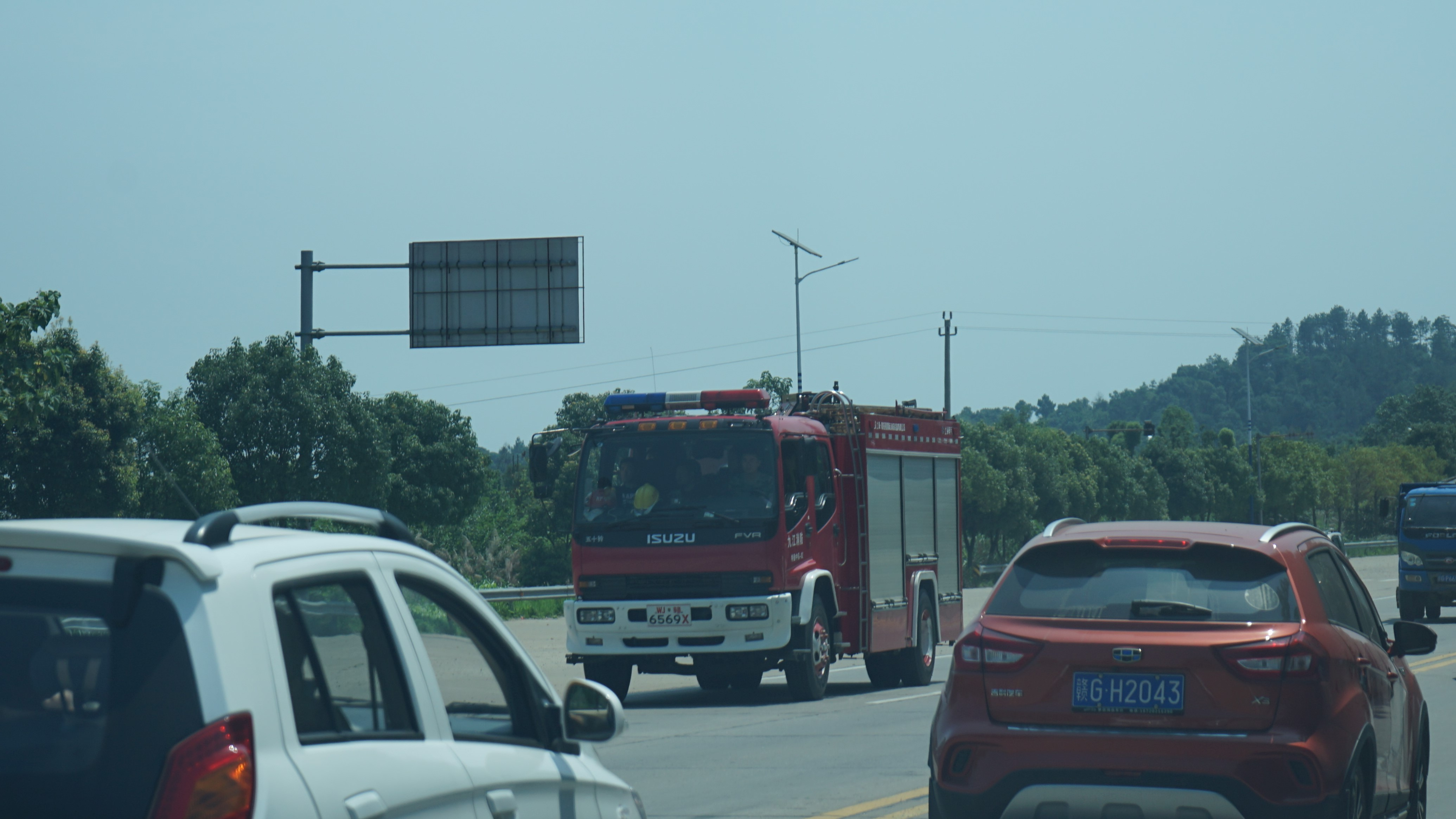
China Fire Services Jiujiang Fire Department Isuzu Forward

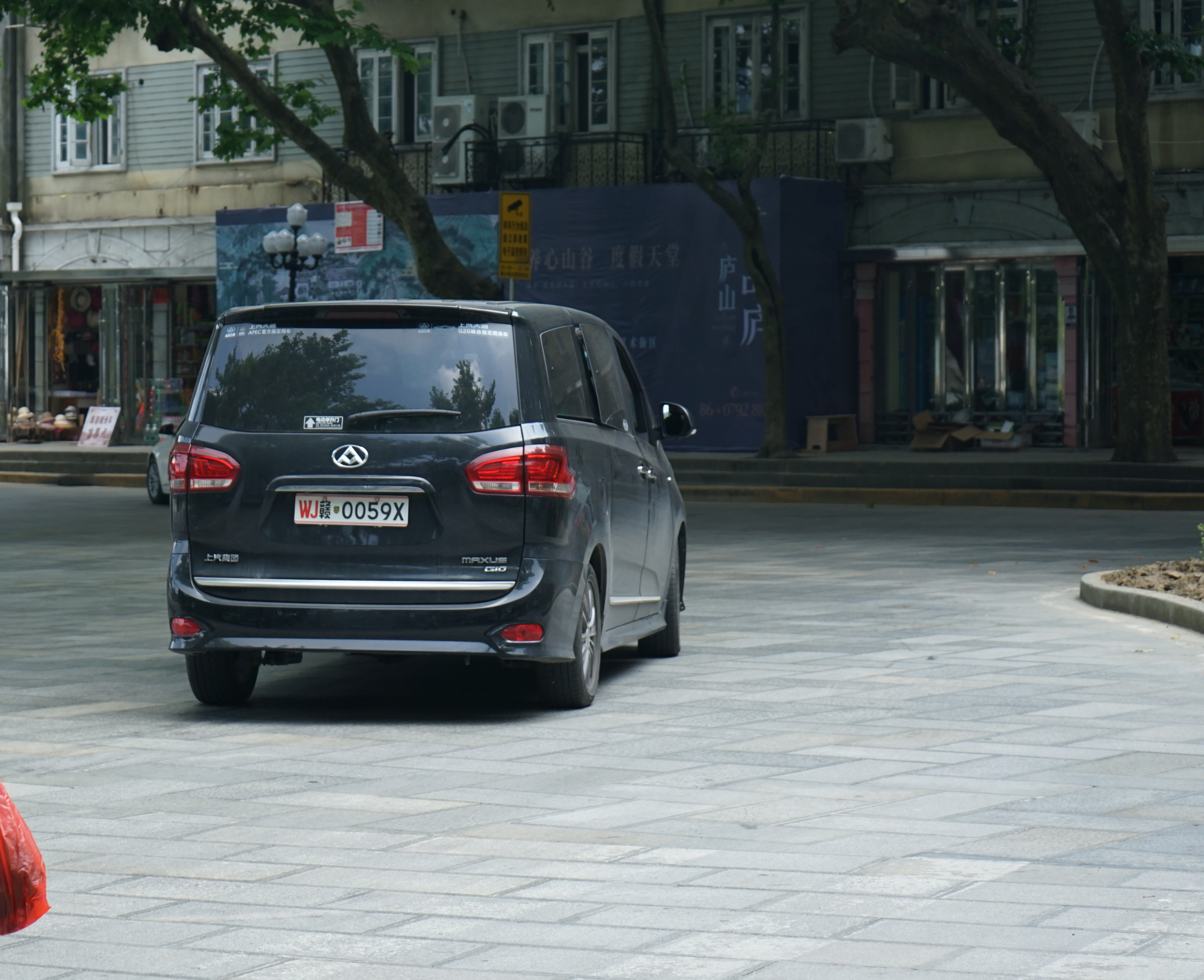
China Fire Services Jiujiang Fire Department Maxus G10

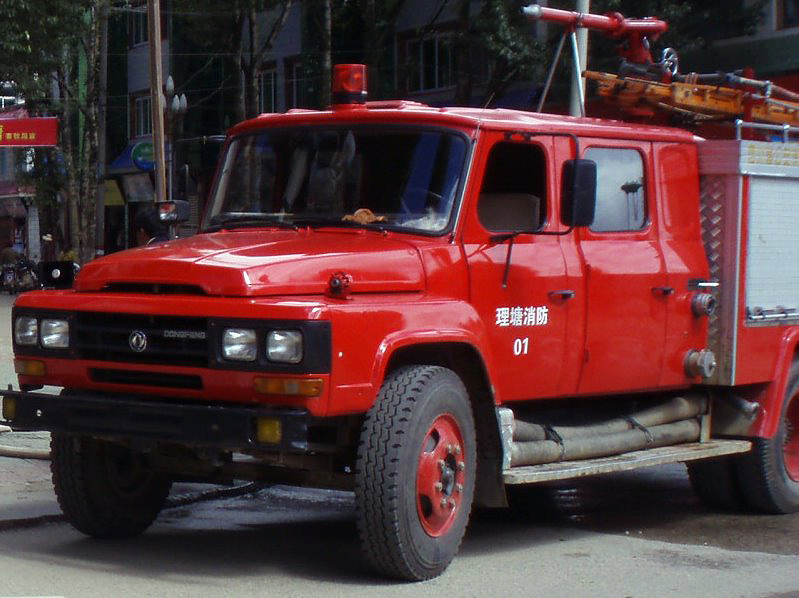
A China Fire Services Garze Fire Department Dongfeng EQ140

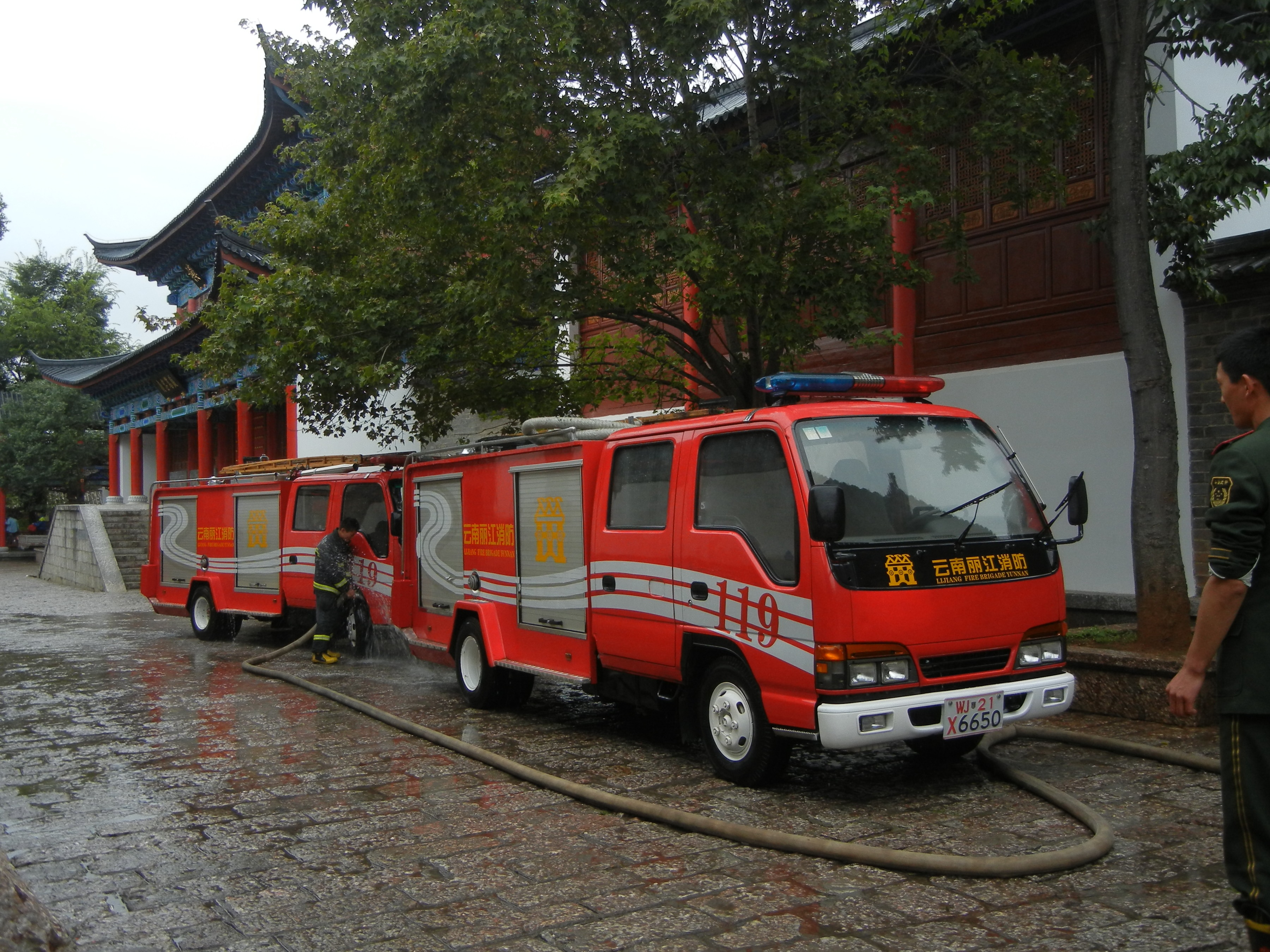
Fire trucks of the China Fire Services Lijiang Fire Department

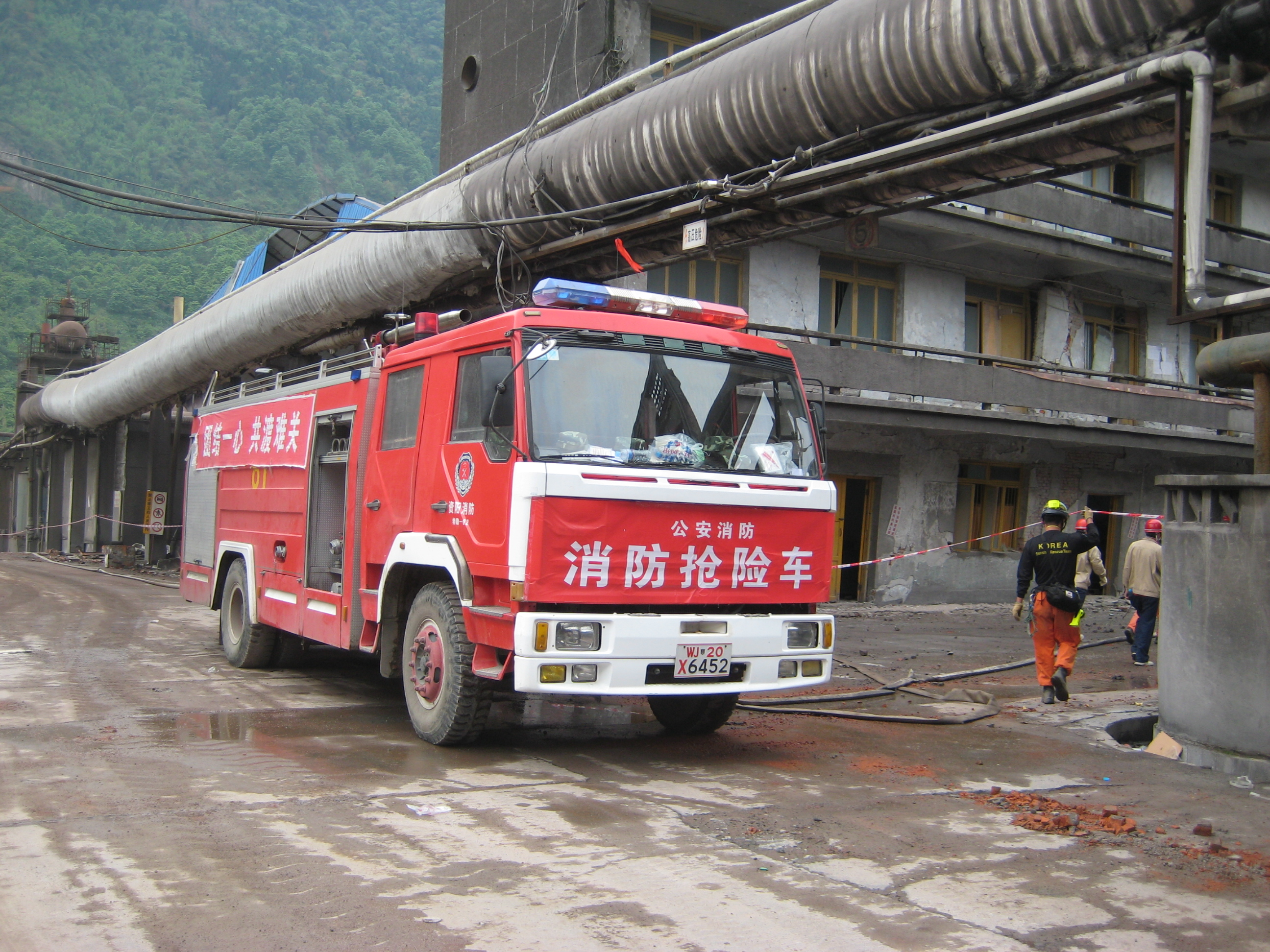
China Fire Services Ziyang Fire Department fire truck conducting disaster relief after the 2008 Sichuan Earthquake

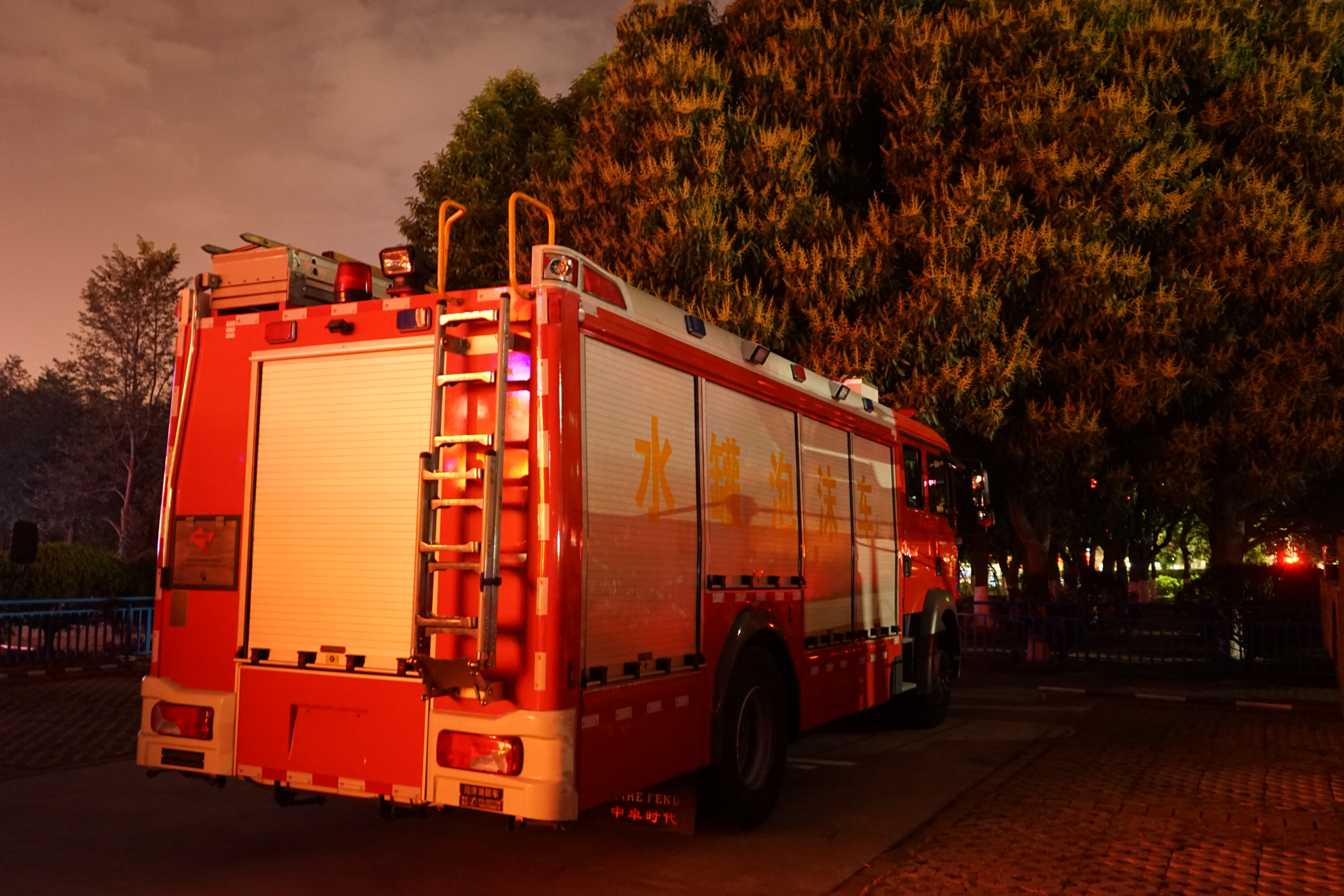
China Fire Services Zhongshan Department fire engine

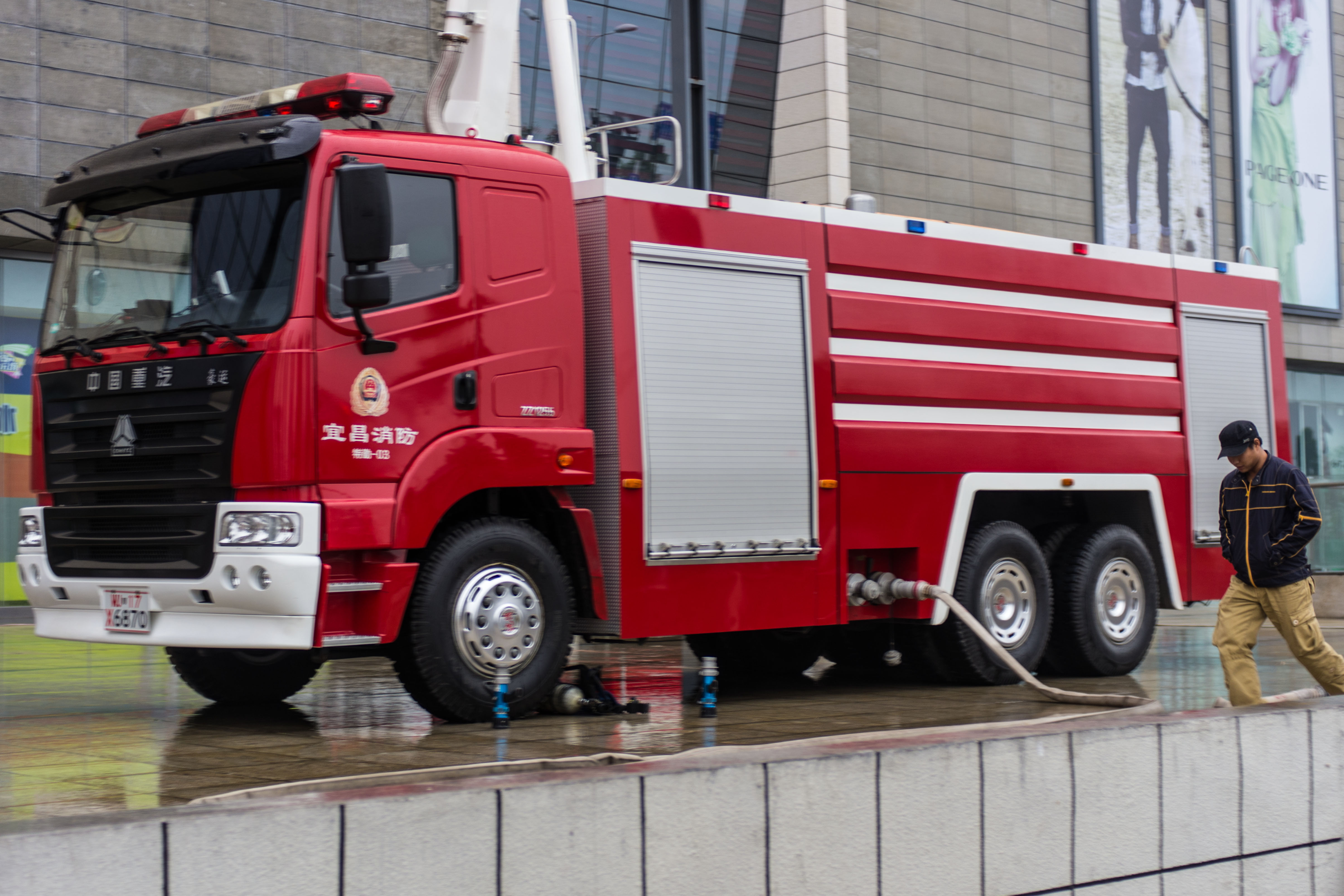
A China Fire Services Yichang Fire Department HOWO fire truck

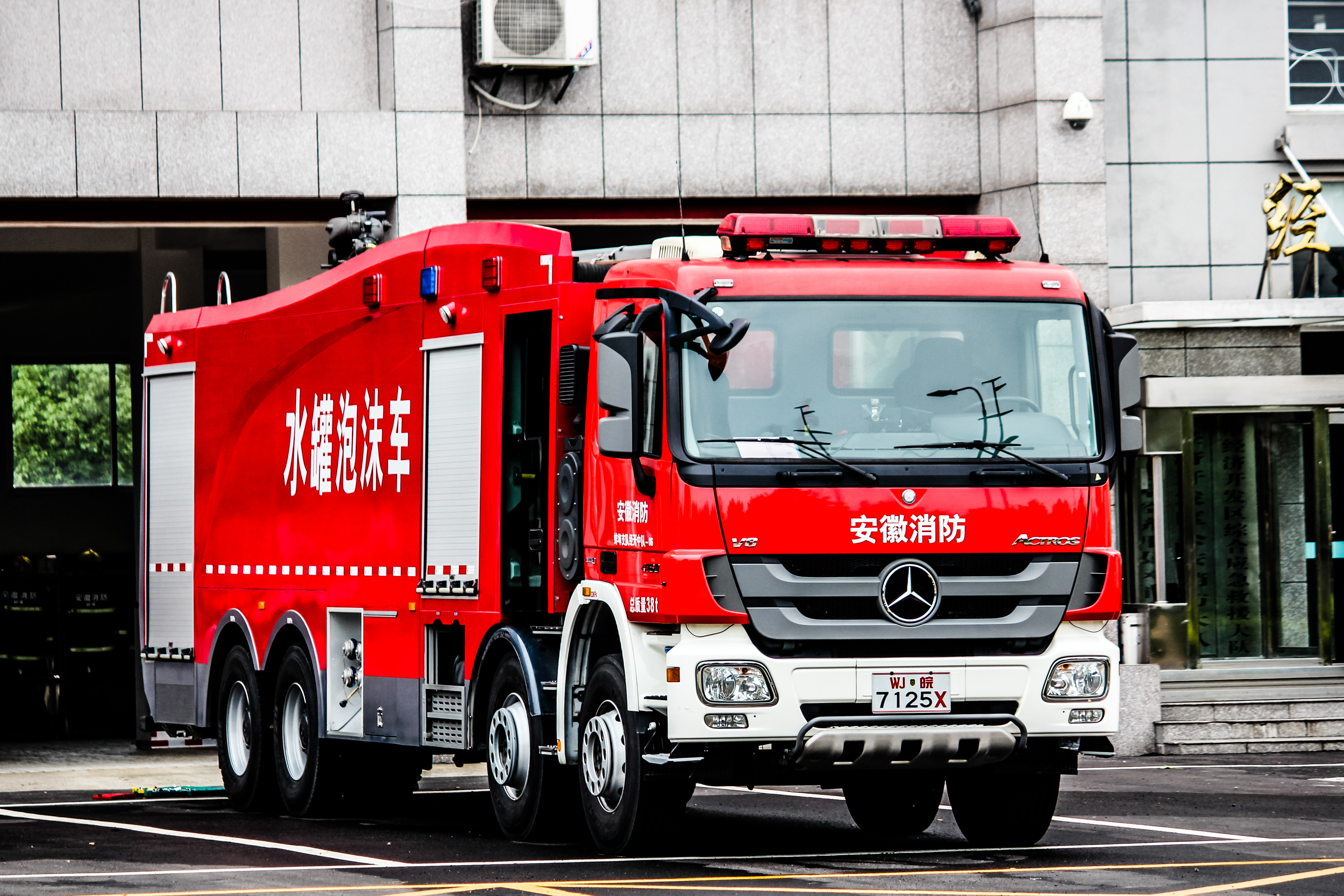
China Fire Services Bengbu fire department Mercedes-Benz Actros

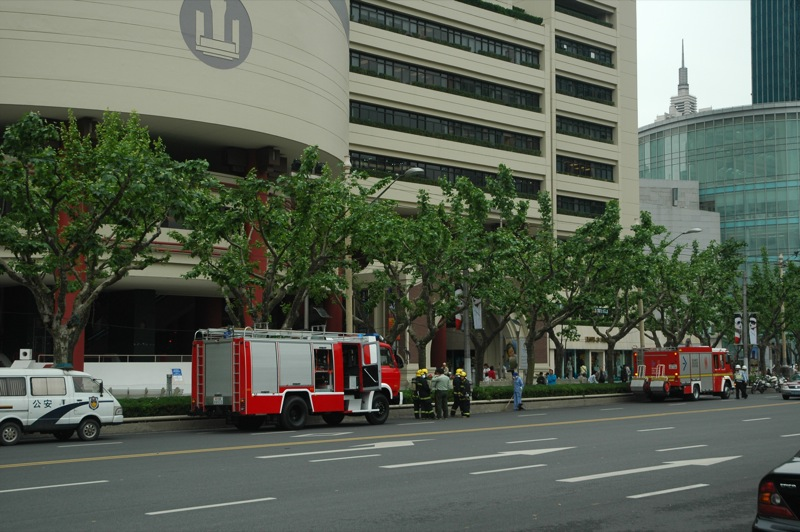
China Fire Services Shanghai Fire Department Fire engines

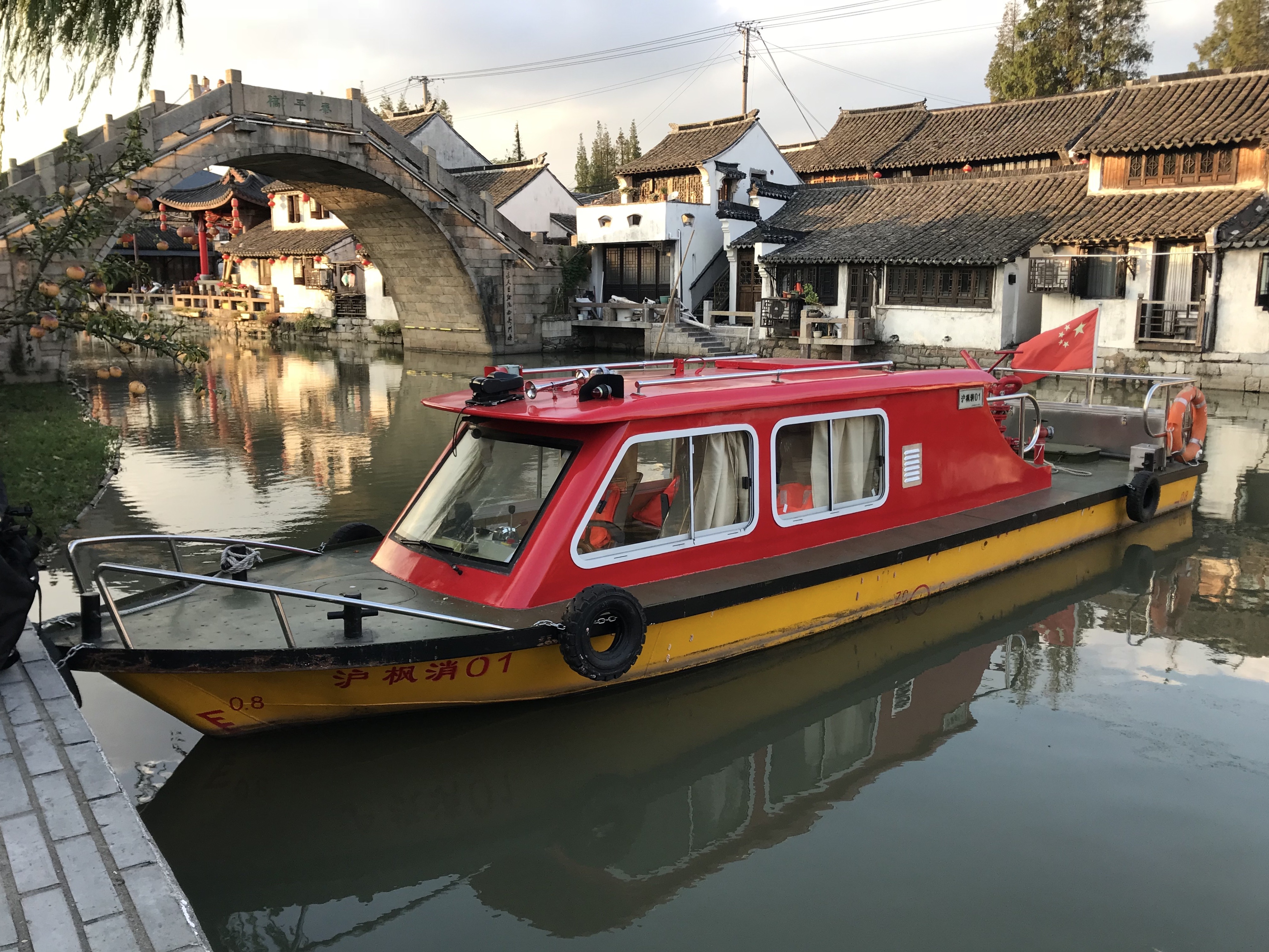
China Fire Services Shanghai Fire Department Jinshan Fire Department Hufengxiao 01 fire boat

== See also ==
- People's Police
- National Fire and Rescue Administration
- People's Armed Police
