= Chinese cutter Huyu =

2008 class of China Coast Guard cutters

History

China
- Name: Haijing 1001
- Operator: People's Armed Police Border Defense Corps Coast Guard
- Laid down: 2003
- Commissioned: 2007
- Decommissioned: March 2013

History

China
- Name: "Huyu"(虎屿); Formerly Pudong (浦东)
- Namesake: Hu Islet, Chaozhou; Pudong
- Operator: China Coast Guard
- Acquired: March 2013
- Renamed: to Huyu, 2018
- Home port: Shanghai
- Identification: Pennant number: 1105 (formerly 31101)
- Status: in active service

General characteristics
- Type: Patrol cutter
- Displacement: 1,617.5 t (1,592.0 long tons)
- Length: 92.59 m (303 ft 9 in)
- Beam: 12 meters
- Boats & landing craft carried: 2 × high speed boats
- Armament: 1 × 37 mm gun; 2x Machine guns; Water cannons
- Aviation facilities: Helipad

The Type 718 cutter (NATO: Haixun-class cutter) is a single-ship class of cutter used by the China Coast Guard. A single ship, Huyu (1105), formerly known as Pudong (31101) and also known as Haijing 1105 due to its pennant number or Haijing 31101 due to its former pennant number, was launched in 2006 and was part of the Chinese Coast Guard Shanghai Detachment. She is currently part of the 1st Bureau of the China Coast Guard and is stationed in Shanghai.

It was formerly the largest ship in service with the People's Armed Police Border Defense Corps Coast Guard

== Design ==
The Pudong has a displacement of 1617.5 tonnes, a length of 92.59 meters and a beam of 12 meters. It is equipped with a 37mm cannon, two machine guns and water cannons. It has a Helipad. It is used to perform roles such as border patrol and interdiction of smugglers and illegal migrants.

== History ==
The Huyu was laid down in 2003.

The Huyu was commissioned as Haijing 1001 (Chinese: 海警 1001) in 2007 as part of the People's Armed Police Border Defense Corps Coast Guard Shanghai Division, which was a ministry of public security active service force.

Haijing 1001 participated in security during Expo 2010.

In March 2013, the Border Defense Corps Coast Guard was merged into the China Coast Guard, and Haijing 1001 was renamed to Pudong (31101).

She was renamed to Huyu(1105) after the China Coast Guard had pennant number reforms while being handed to the People's Armed Police in 2018.

On 8 October 2016 Pudong patrolled near the Diaoyu islands.

On 26 April 2021, Huyu intercepted two boats smuggling cigarettes.

It was deployed during the Joint Sword-2024B exercises during October 2024.
