= Dongfeng EQ140 =

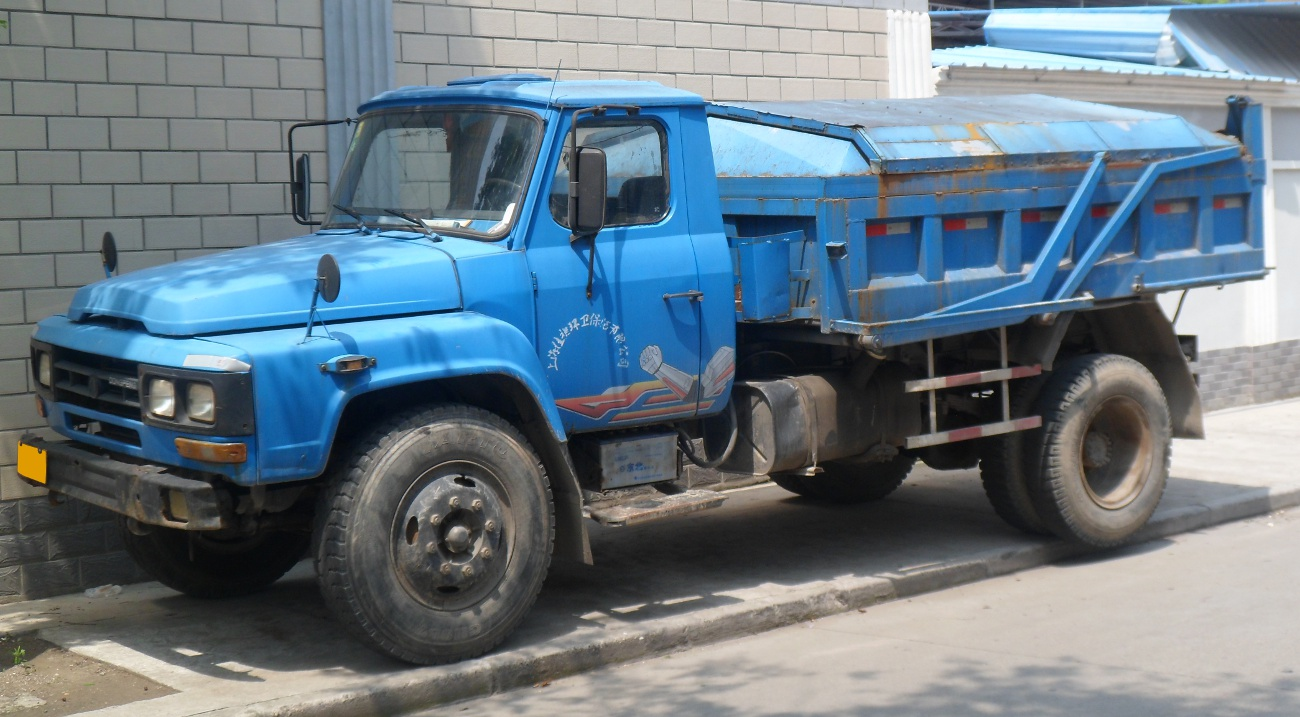

Overview
- Manufacturer: Dongfeng Automobile
- Production: July 1978 - 2011
- Assembly: China: Shiyan, Hubei

Dimensions
- Curb weight: 9,200 kg (5,000 kg payload)

Chronology
- Predecessor: Dongfeng EQ240
- Successor: Dongfeng EQ153

The Dongfeng EQ140 is a 5-ton truck manufactured by the Dongfeng Motor Corporation/Second Automobile Works. It is the first civilian vehicle manufactured by Dongfeng and was introduced in 1978. The vehicle turned the loss-making Dongfeng into a profitable company.

The EQ140 uses technology based on the Jiefang CA-10 and Dongfeng's first truck, the Dongfeng EQ240, but was developed by FAW Group. Although branded by Dongfeng, many other smaller companies in fact also assembled the truck from parts supplied by Dongfeng.

In its first production year, 1978, 5120 vehicles were produced. At its peak the EQ140 held a market share of 66% in the medium-duty truck class in China.

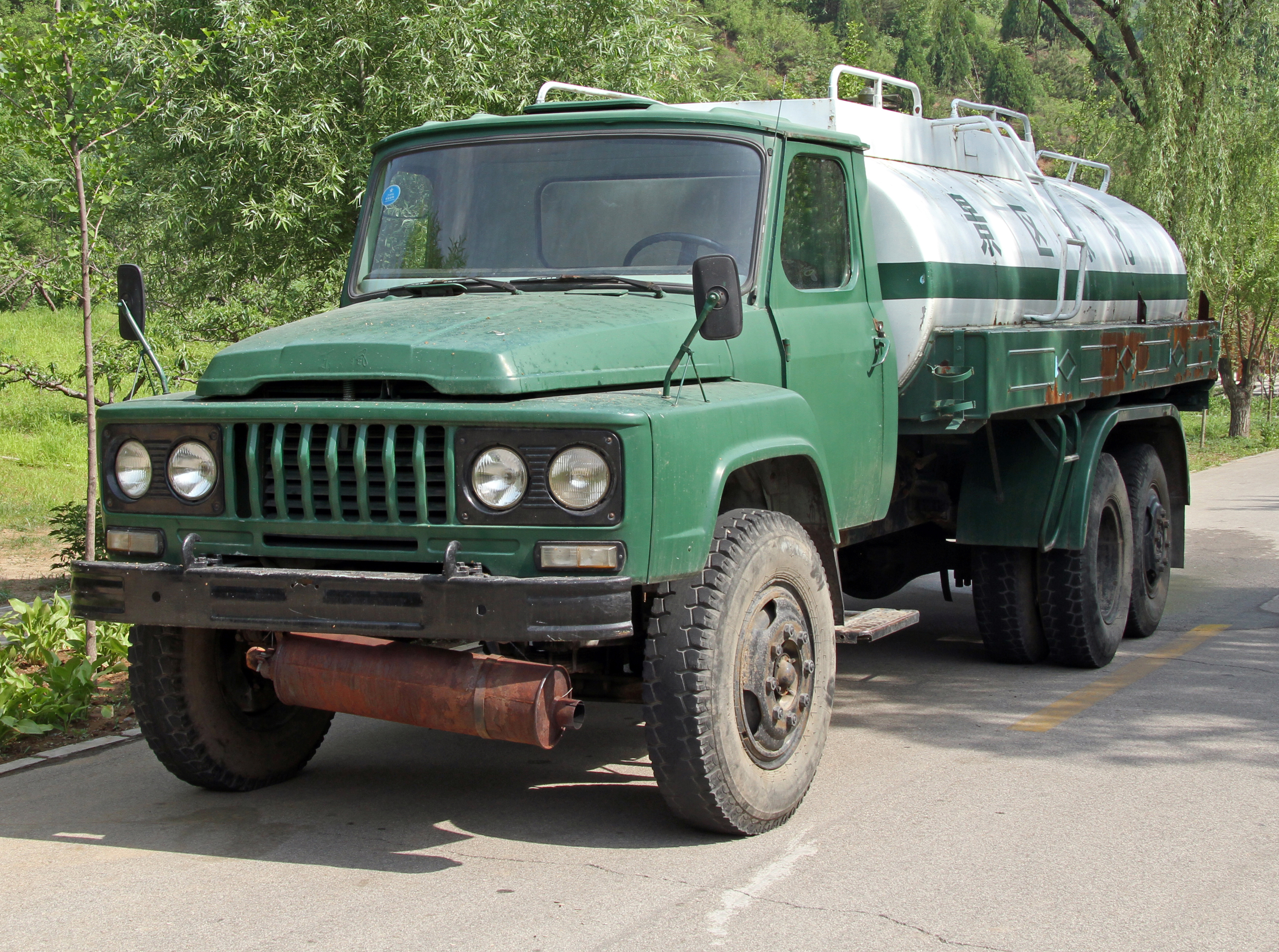
6 wheel version

In 1984, the EQ140 was facelifted, the main visual difference being the panoramic windscreen, replacing the split windscreen. Other changes include an improved interior. This post-facelift version was called the EQ140-1 and was developed under supervision of Dongfeng's chief engineer Meng Shaonong. In 1992 a second facelift, named EQ140-2, went into production, featuring improved electrics and use of Nissan Diesel technology. A final facelift in 1994 introduced a more rounded bonnet, however this version was only produced in limited numbers.

Production ended in 2011. As of 2010, 1.1 million units had been sold.
