= Dongfeng EQ240/EQ2081 =

Dongfeng EQ240/EQ2081/EQ2082
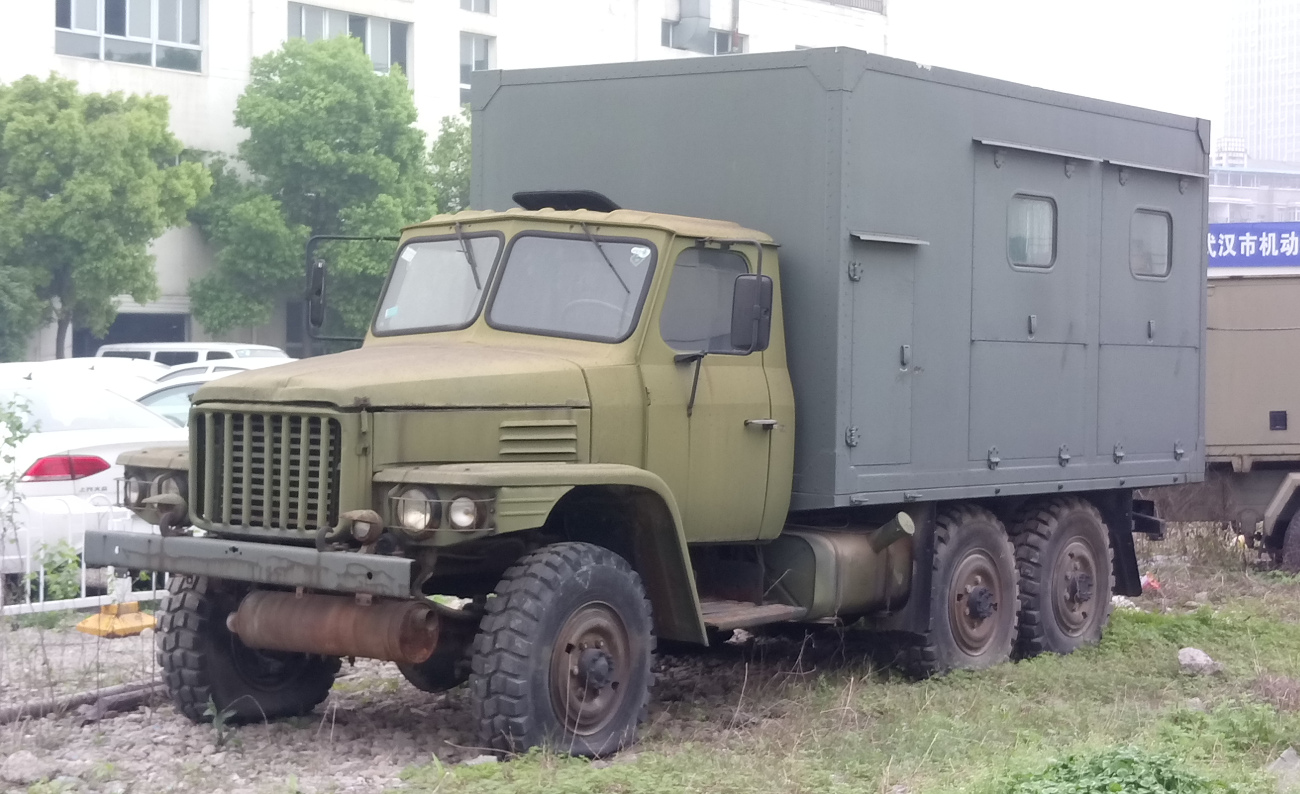

Specifications
- Mass: ULW: 5090 kg MaxW: 7800 kg
- Length: 6,530 mm (257 in)
- Width: 2,400 mm (94 in)
- Height: 2,385 mm (94 in)
- Crew: driver, co-driver + 8 or 12 passengers
- Engine: Inline 6-cylinder Cummins-designed 6BT5.9 Turbo-charged diesel engine 87 hp (65 kW)
- Suspension: 4 or 6 wheel drive
- Operational range: 400 kilometres (250 mi)
- Maximum speed: 87 km/h (54 mph)

The Dongfeng EQ240/EQ2081/EQ2082 (export name Aeolus) is a 2.5 tonne capacity, six-wheel drive troop/cargo carrier truck developed and built by Dongfeng Motor Corporation, developed for and still used by the People's Liberation Army of the People's Republic of China for transport. The Dong Feng EQ2080/2081, together with the larger but visually similar EQ2100, are currently one of the most numerous troop carrying/cargo truck in service with the PLA.

== History ==
The Dongfeng EQ240 first entered service with the PLA in 1975.

== Design ==
The EQ2080/2081 is a 2,500 kg class chassis designed for workshop shelters used by the Air Force and Navy, intended for operations in mountainous areas and on rough roads and tracks. The vehicle's layout is entirely conventional, featuring a forward-mounted engine, a steel cab that seats the driver and two passengers, and a load area at the rear. The standard cargo body includes a steel and wood floor, steel side racks, and a tailgate. Body options are also reported to include dump, tanker, and crane configurations.

Optional equipment consists of a power take-off and a 4,500 kg winch mounted behind the front bumper.

== Variants ==
=== EQ240 ===
The first vehicle produced by the Dongfeng Company, the petrol powered EQ240 entered service with the PLA in 1975.

=== EQ2080 ===
In the 1990s, PLA authorities redesignated all truck references, and the vehicle became the EQ2080.

=== EQ2081 ===
After Dongfeng agreed a diesel engine joint-venture with Cummins, the truck was redesignated as the EQ2081, powered by a 6BT5.9 Turbo-charged diesel engine.

=== EQ2082E ===
The EQ2082E (or 2082E6D), is a Peruvian export version built to replace United States-built M35 series and Russian-built Ural 375 trucks. Peru received in excess of 400 trucks from Dong Feng between 1995 and 1998 carrying the designation.

=== EQ2082 6x6 Troop Carrier ===
The EQ2082 6x6 Troop Carrier, is a Philippine export version built to replace United States-built M35 series. Philippines received from Davao based Jinyi Import & Export Trading Co. Inc. Wherein 18 trucks were delivered at a per unit cost of Php4,995,000.00 each from Dong Feng in October 2021. Further orders were cancelled.

== Operators ==
- China: People's Liberation Army
- Peru: Peruvian Army
- Philippines: Philippine Army 18 units delivered in July 2021, procured through public bidding under Truck Troop Carrier Medium Acquisition Project in 2020.Further orders were cancelled.
- Sudan: Sudanese Armed Forces
