= List of tallest buildings in Tianjin =

Tall buildings in Tianjin
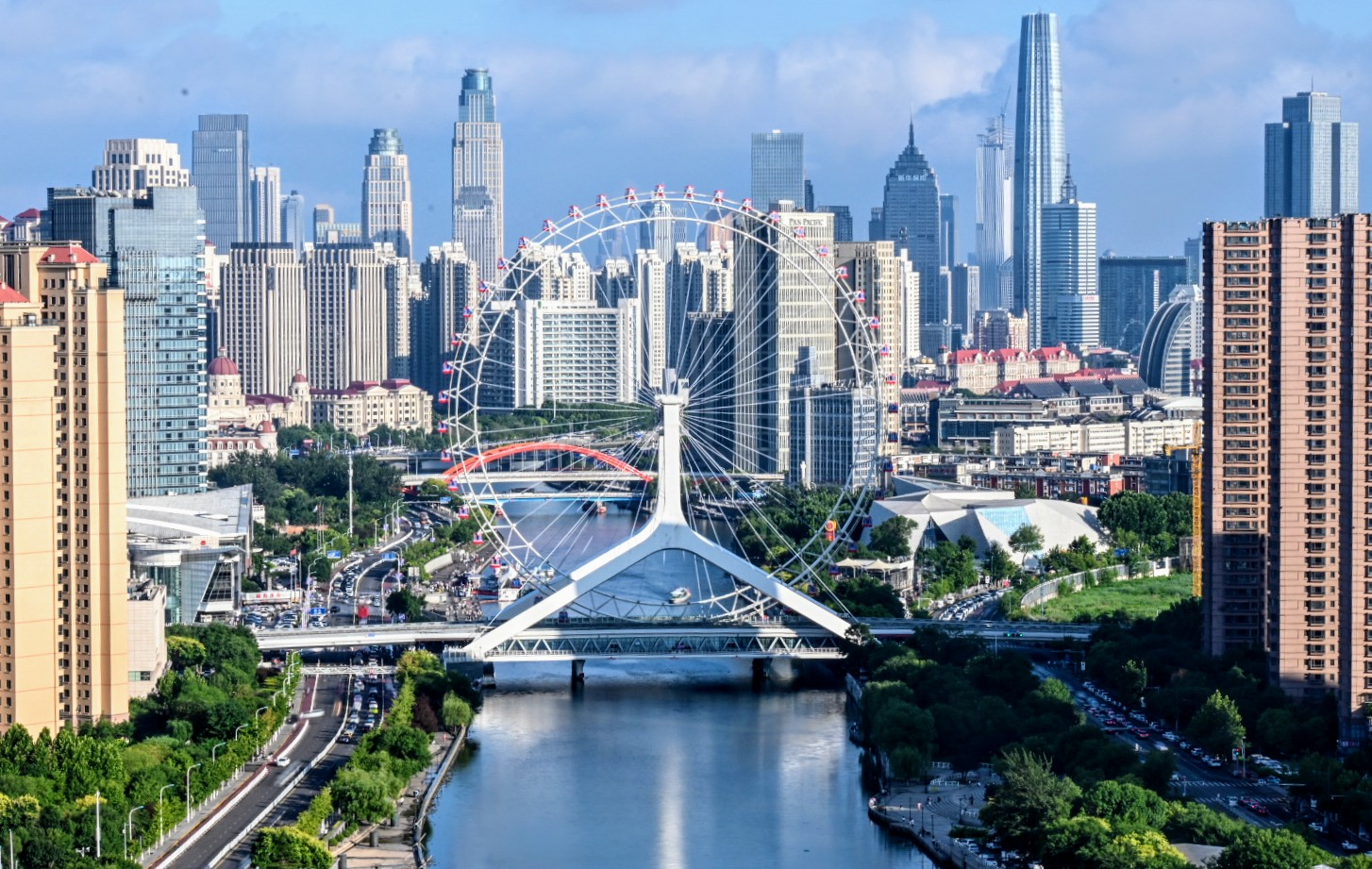
- Skyline of Tianjin along the Hai River, with Tianjin Eye in the centre
- Tallest building: Tianjin CTF Finance Centre (2019)
- Tallest building height: 530 m (1,739 ft)
- First 150 m+ building: Post and Communications Network Center (1997)

Number of tall buildings
- Taller than 150 m (492 ft): 76 (2025)
- Taller than 200 m (656 ft): 34 (2025)
- Taller than 300 m (984 ft): 3
- Taller than 400 m (1,312 ft): 1

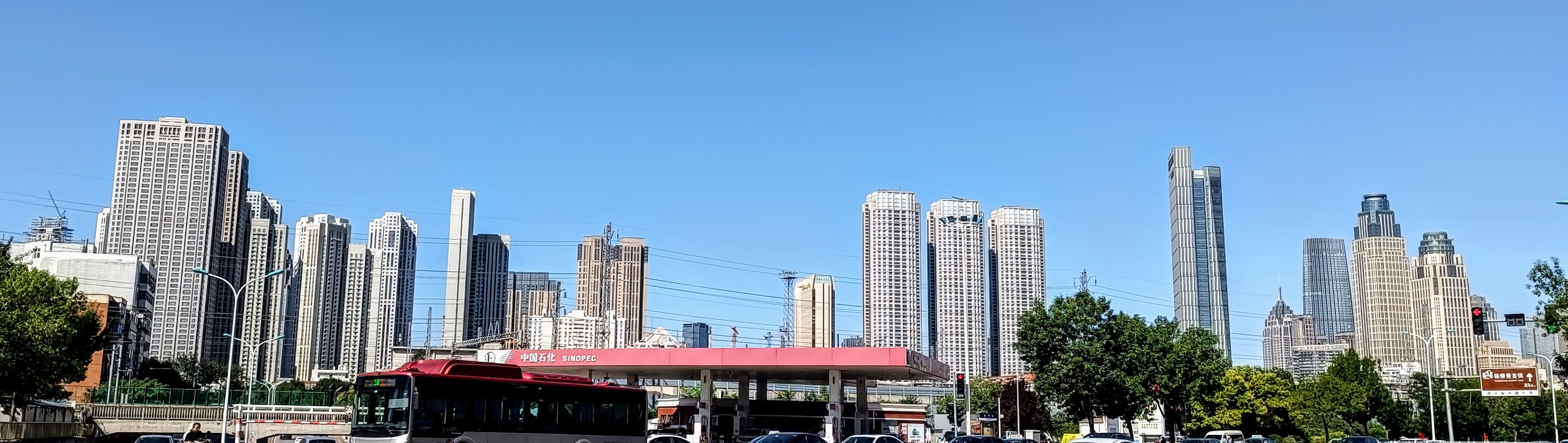
Skyscrapres in Hedong District

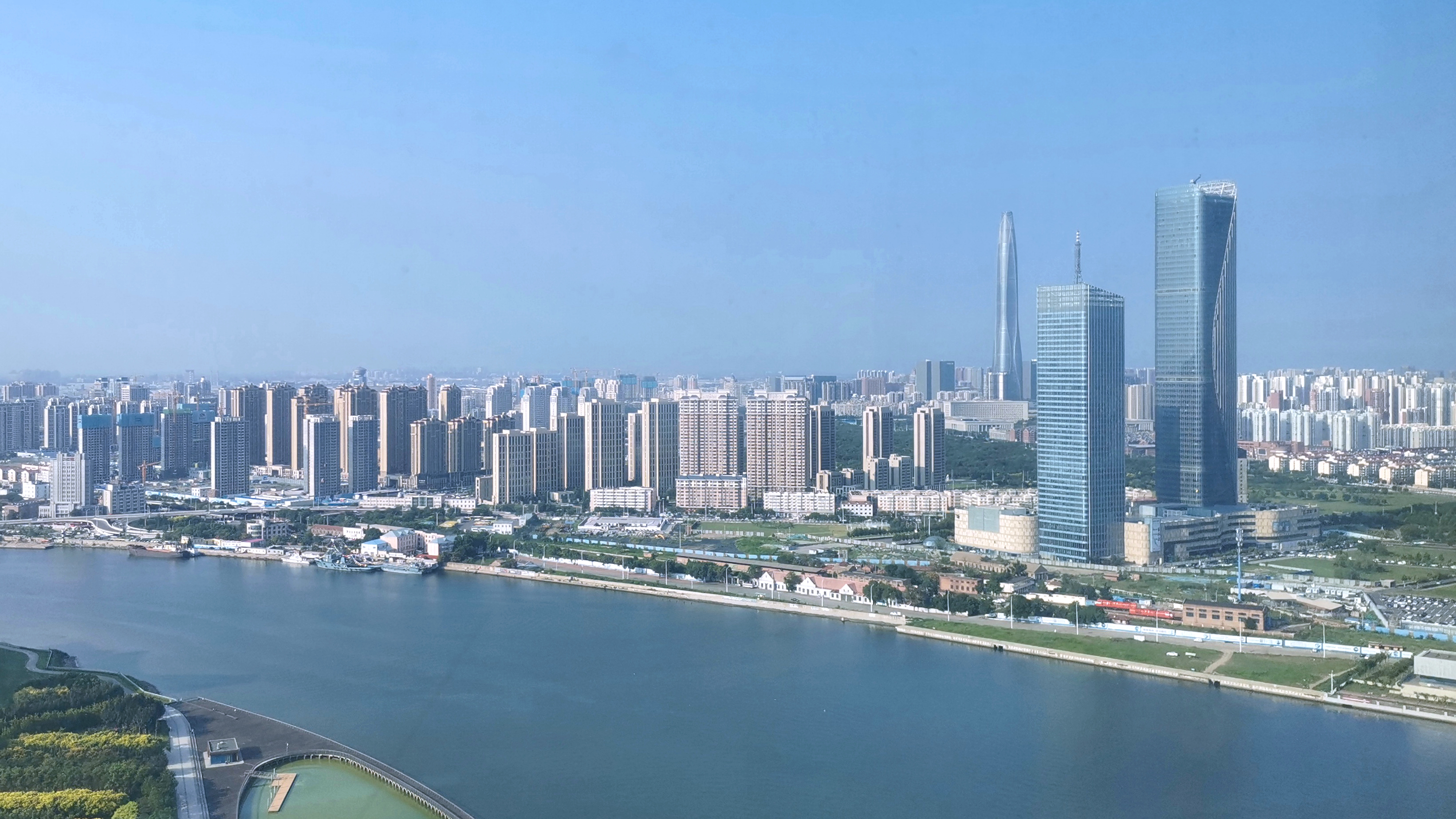
Binhai, with Tianjin CTF Finance Centre in the background

This list of tallest buildings in Tianjin ranks the tallest skyscrapers in the Chinese city of Tianjin by height. Tianjin is a megacity and one of four directly administered municipalities in China, with a population of 13,866,009 inhabitants at the time of the 2020 Chinese census. Bordering the capital of Beijing, Tianjin is a major port and financial centre and forms part of the Jing-Jin-Ji urban agglomeration.

A large portion of Tianjin's skyscrapers are located in the district of Heping, which is considered to be the city's central business district; many sit along the Hai River, which runs through the city centre. The new area of Binhai is also home to a significant portion of skyscrapers, including the Tianjin CTF Finance Centre. While not a skyscraper, the Tianjin Radio and Television Tower, at a height of 415.2 m (1,362 ft), is a major landmark in the city.

== History ==
The first skyscrapers taller than 150 metres began to appear in the late 1990s. Following a major construction boom in the early-to-mid 2010s, the rate of new skyscrapers slowed down considerably until it increased again during the mid-2020s. As of 2026, Tianjin is home to 76 skyscrapers over 150 m (492 ft) tall, 34 of which are greater than 200 m (656 ft) in height, and three supertall skyscrapers. The first of these, Tianjin World Financial Center, was completed in 2011 and reached a height of 336.9 m (1,105 ft). It was the tallest building in Tianjin until 2016, with the completion of Tianjin Modern City Office Tower, which was 338 m (1,109 ft) tall. Since 2019, the city's tallest completed building has been the Tianjin CTF Finance Centre, the eighth-tallest building in the world at 530 m (1,739 ft) tall.

In 2009, during the first boom, construction began on Goldin Finance 117, a 597 m (1,957 ft), 128-storey supertall skyscraper that would have been the third tallest building in the world had it been completed as originally planned in 2014. It topped out in 2015, but was never completed and put on hold for ten years. In 2025, it was announced that construction would resume and the tower will be completed by 2027. If so, Tianjin would become the only city with two skyscrapers above 500 m (1,640 ft). Besides Goldin Finance 117, there are two more supertall skyscrapers under construction, Zhonghai City Plaza and TEDA IFC 1.

== Tallest buildings ==
This list ranks completed skyscrapers in Tianjin that are at least 200 m (656 ft) m tall, based on standard height measurement. This includes spires and architectural details but does not include antenna masts.

Was the tallest building in Tianjin upon completion

Rank	Building	Image	Height	Floors	Use	Year	Notes
1	Tianjin CTF Finance Centre		530 m	97	Mixed-use	2019	
2	Tianjin Modern City Office Tower		338 m	72	Office	2016	
3	Tianjin World Financial Center		336.9 m	75	Office	2011	
4	Jin Wan Plaza 9		299.7 m	66	Mixed-use	2017	
5	Powerlong Center Tower 1		289.9 m	59	Office	2019	
6	Bohai Bank Tower		270 m	55	Office	2015	
7	Financial Street Heping Center		263 m	47	Office	2016	
8	The Metropolitan Office Tower		258 m	53	Office	2013	
9	5 Taian Dao		250.8 m	45	Office	2015	
10	Shangbang Leasing Tower		246 m	54	Office	2016	
11	Jin Wan Plaza 2		240 m	58	Office	2015	
12	Tianjin Junlin Tianxia Building		239 m	64	Mixed-use	2010	
13	Tianjin Xinda Plaza		238 m	51	Mixed-use	2004	
14	Tianjin International Trade Tower 1		235 m	57	Mixed-use	2014	
15	Opus Heping Hanlin Tower 1		217.5 m	63	Residential	2020	
16	Tianjin Kerry Center R1		215 m	59	Residential	2014	
17	Tianjin Kerry Center R2		215 m	59	Residential	2014	
18	Tianjin Kerry Center R3		215 m	59	Residential	2014	
19	Metropolis Tower 1		215 m	45	Office	2018	
20	Metropolis Tower 2		215 m	45	Office	2018	
21	Four Seasons Tower		214.2 m	48	Mixed-use	2016	
22	Hongji Commercial Centre 1		210 m	52	Office	1999	
23	Financial Street Nankai Center		210 m	46	Office	2015	
24	Tianjin Maoye Building		205.3 m	51	Mixed-use	2015	
25	Golden Mansion Center		203 m	36	Mixed-use	2013	
26	Renaissance Hotel Tianjin		203 m	48	Hotel	2002	
27	R&F Guangdong North Tower		202 m (Note: Height is an estimate.)	46	Office	2015	
28	MIG Financial Tower		202 m (Note: Height is an estimate.)	46	Office	2015	
29	Binhai International Trade Center		201.5 m	42	Office	2019	
30	R&F Center Tower 1		200 m	47	Office	2014	
31	R&F Center Tower 2		200 m	47	Residential	2014	
32	Binhai Cathay Tower		200 m	37	Office	2014	
33	Waterfront Ginza K2		200 m	66	Office	2016	
34	Waterfront Ginza K21		200 m	66	Office	2016	

== Tallest under construction or proposed ==
=== Under construction ===
This list ranks skyscrapers under construction in Tianjin that are expected to be at least 200 m (656 ft) m tall, based on standard height measurement.

Building	Height	Floors	Use	Year	Notes
Tianjin 117 Building	596.6 m	128	Mixed-use	2027	
Zhonghai City Plaza	339.9 m	75	Office	2026	
TEDA IFC 1	313 m	56	Office	2025	
Yujiapu Yinglan International Finance Center	299.5 m	63	Office	2025	
TEDA IFC 2	240 m	62	Residential	2025	
Tianjin Kerry Center Office Building	228 m	44	Office	2025	
COSCO Tower 2	216 m	50	Office	2026	
