= Teda =

Teda or TEDA may refer to:

- Teda people, Toubou ethnic group that lives mostly in Chad
- Teda language, or Tedaga language, spoken by Teda people
- Tianjin Economic-Technological Development Area, abbreviated as TEDA, free market zone in Tianjin, China
- TEDA Holding, state-owned enterprise based in Tianjin, China
  - Tianjin Teda F.C., Chinese football club, a subsidiary of TEDA Holding
    - TEDA Football Stadium, in Tianjin, China
  - TEDA Group, a subsidiary of TEDA Holding
    - Tianjin TEDA Co., a subsidiary of TEDA Group
- triethylenediamine, also known as DABCO or 1,4-diazabicyclo[2.2.2]octane, a chemical compound.
- Tamil Nadu Energy Development Agency also known TEDA, a state governmental agency in Indian state of Tamil Nadu.
