= Tianjin Teda =

Tianjin TEDA may refer to:

- Tianjin TEDA Investment Holding (TEDA Holding), state-owned enterprise based in Tianjin, China
  - Tianjin TEDA F.C., Chinese football club based in Tianjin, a subsidiary of TEDA Holding
  - Tianjin TEDA Group a subsidiary of TEDA Holding
    - Tianjin TEDA Co. a listed company and subsidiary of TEDA Group

== See also ==
- Tianjin Economic-Technological Development Area
