= Changjiang (disambiguation) =

Changjiang or Chang Jiang is the Chinese name for the Yangtze River.

Changjiang may also refer to:

== Places ==
- Changjiang Li Autonomous County (昌江黎族自治县), Hainan
- Changjiang District (昌江区), Jingdezhen, Jiangxi
- Changjiang, Hengshan (长江镇), a town of Hengshan County, Hunan.

== Other uses ==
- Changjiang Scholars Program (长江学者奖励计划), Chinese higher education development programme
- Changjiang Securities (长江证劵), a securities company in Wuhan, China
- Chang Jiang (motorcycle) (長江), former brand name
- Chang Jiang EV (长江), former electric car manufacturer
