= Casualties of the 2015 Tianjin explosions =

Container storage site disaster in China

A total of 173 people died during the 2015 Tianjin explosions, including eight who were listed as missing and presumed dead; a further 798 people were injured. The Tianjin explosions were the deadliest single incident the Chinese firefighters had to respond to since the establishment of the People's Republic of China in 1949.

== Statistics ==
Classification	Confirmed dead	Presumed dead	Total
China Fire Services active service firefighters	24	0	24
Volunteer firefighters	75	5	80
Police	11	0	11
Civilians	55	3	58
Total	165	8	173

== China Fire Services active service firefighters ==
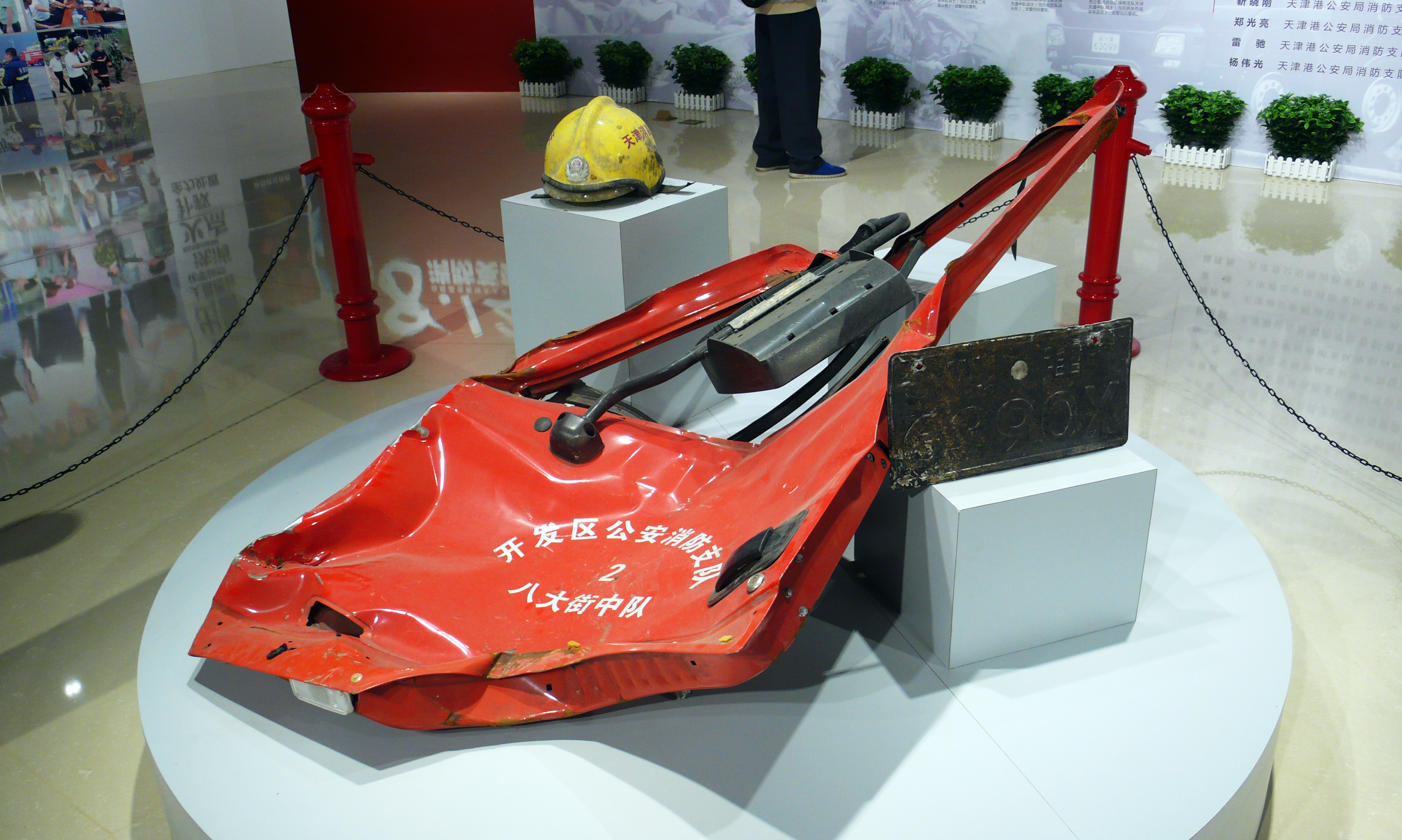
Remains of a fire truck of the 8th Street Company damaged in the 2015 Tianjin Explosion in the China Fire Museum

Prior to its disbandment in 2018, China Fire Services was part of the Ministry of Public Security Active Service Forces, meaning CFS firefighters were People's Armed Police personnel.

A total of 46 firefighting companies, 143 firefighting vehicles and over 1000 fire engines of the China Fire Services were dispatched.

A total of 24 active service firefighters were killed, with 69 more injured.

The 8th Street Company suffered the most casualties out of all the companies responding to the explosions, out of 26 firefighters sent, 8 died and 18 were injured, causing the company to only be able to be re-mobilized on December 31, 2015, due to the casualties and multiple firefighters leaving due to survivor guilt. On March 29, 2017, the 8th Street Company received the honorary title "Firefighting Hero Company" (灭火救援英雄中队) for their actions and losses during the Tianjin explosions.

After the list of fallen firefighters was made public, multiple ambulances had to be deployed due to many family members of the victims having heart attacks out of shock.

=== Confirmed dead ===
Name and rank	Chinese name	Gender	Age	Years of service	Unit	City	Province	Notes
Corporal Cheng Yuan	成圆	Male	21	4	China Fire Services Tianjin Fire Department Economic-Technological Development Area Brigade 8th Street Company			
Private Chen Bowen	陈博文	Male	19	1	China Fire Services Tianjin Fire Department Economic-Technological Development Area Brigade, Specialist Company			
Private Cai Jiayuan	蔡家远	Male	19	1	China Fire Services Tianjin Fire Department Economic-Technological Development Area Brigade 8th Street Company			
Corporal Gao Hongsen	高洪森	Male	20	3	China Fire Services Tianjin Fire Department Economic-Technological Development Area Brigade, Specialist Company			
Private 1st Class Guo Junyao	郭俊瑶	Male	19	2	China Fire Services Tianjin Fire Department Economic-Technological Development Area Brigade 3rd Street Company	Jining	Shandong	
Major Jiang Zeguo	江泽国	Male	36	16	China Fire Services Tianjin Fire Department Economic-Technological Development Area Brigade Headquarters			
1st Lieutenant Li Hongxi	李洪喜	Male	34	16	China Fire Services Tianjin Fire Department Economic-Technological Development Area Brigade 8th Street Company (Political commissar)			
Private 1st Class Li Yuanhang	李远航	Male	21	2	China Fire Services Tianjin Fire Department Economic-Technological Development Area Brigade, Specialist Company			
1st Lieutenant Liang Shilei	梁仕磊	Male	26	3	China Fire Services Tianjin Fire Department Economic-Technological Development Area Brigade 8th Street Company (Acting Company commander)			
Staff Sergeant Lin Haiming	林海明	Male	30	12	China Fire Services Tianjin Fire Department Economic-Technological Development Area Brigade, Specialist Company		Liaoning	
Sergeant Liu Cheng	刘程	Male	23	6	China Fire Services Tianjin Fire Department Economic-Technological Development Area Brigade 8th Street Company			
Private Ning Yu	宁宇	Male	19	1	China Fire Services Tianjin Fire Department Dongjiang Port Area Brigade Tianbao Road Company			
Private First Class Ning Zimo	宁子默	Male	21	2	China Fire Services Tianjin Fire Department Economic-Technological Development Area Brigade, Specialist Company	Jining	Shandong	
Corporal Pang Ti	庞题	Male	24	5	China Fire Services Tianjin Fire Department Dongjiang Port Area Brigade Tianbao Road Company	Suizhou	Hubei	
Staff Sergeant Shao Junqiang	邵俊强	Male	30	12	China Fire Services Tianjin Fire Department Economic-Technological Development Area Brigade Taihu Road Company Specialist Squad (former squad leader)			
2nd Lieutenant Tang Ziyi	唐子懿	Male	26	6	China Fire Services Tianjin Fire Department Economic-Technological Development Area Brigade 8th Street Company	Tianjin		
Staff Sergeant Tian Baojian	田宝健	Male	30	10	China Fire Services Tianjin Fire Department Dongjiang Port Area Brigade Central Ring West road Company Driver squad (former squad leader)	Tianjin		
Lieutenant Colonel Wang Jiliang	王吉良	Male	44	25	China Fire Services Tianjin Fire Department Economic-Technological Development Area Brigade (Former Deputy fire chief)	Dezhou	Shandong	Highest ranking firefighter to die in the explosions
Sergeant Wang Qi	王琪	Male	24	7	China Fire Services Tianjin Fire Department Dongjiang Port Area Brigade Tianbao Road company			
Corporal Yang Gang	杨钢	Male	23	4	China Fire Services Tianjin Fire Department Economic-Technological Development Area Brigade 8th Street Company	Chongqing		
Sergeant Yin Yanrong	尹艳荣	Male	25	7	China Fire Services Tianjin Fire Department Economic-Technological Development Area Brigade, Specialist Company		Heilongjiang	
Private Yuan Hai	袁海	Male	18	1	China Fire Services Tianjin Fire Department Dongjiang Port Area Brigade Tianbao Road Company		Sichuan	Youngest active service firefighter killed in the explosions
Corporal Zhen Yuhang	甄宇航	Male	22	4	China Fire Services Tianjin Fire Department Economic-Technological Development Area Brigade 3rd Street Company		Hebei	
Private 1st Class Zi Qinghai	訾青海	Male	20	2	China Fire Services Tianjin Fire Department Economic-Technological Development Area Brigade 8th Street Company			

== Volunteer firefighters ==
All volunteer firefighter (Known as "career firefighters"(专职消防员) in China) casualties were in the Port of Tianjin Public Security Bureau Firefighting division. The Port of Tianjin Public Security Bureau was renamed to the Tianjin Binhai New Area Public Security Bureau Port of Tianjin Subbureau in 2018, and disbanded in 2022.

Casualties were particularly high among volunteer firefighters due to their fire station's close proximity to the explosions, meaning they were some of the first to respond.

All volunteer firefighters killed in the line of duty received martyr status.

=== Confirmed dead ===
Name	Chinese name	Gender	Age	City	Province
Yin Legang	殷乐刚	Male			
Dong Zepeng	董泽鹏	Male			
Fan Chunyu	樊春雨	Male			
Fan Xingyun	范兴运	Male			
Han Junbo	韩军波	Male			
Jia Hongguang	贾洪广	Male			
Qi Jixu	齐吉旭	Male	18	Dezhou	Shandong
Tang Xianwang	唐先旺	Male			
Chen Xiande	陈宪德	Male			
Cui Fukang	崔富康	Male			
Cui Zhenyu	崔振宇	Male			
Dong Yaoyong	董尧勇	Male			
Fan Xiaofei	樊小飞	Male			
Han Zhigang	韩志刚	Male			
He Chengpeng	何成朋	Male			
Hu Le	胡乐	Male			
Jia Naiyuan	贾乃源	Male			
Jin Xiaogang	靳晓刚	Male			
Lei Chi	雷驰	Male			
Lei Yong	雷勇	Male			
Li Fuyue	李富越	Male			
Li Xiao	李潇	Male			
Li Xueming	李学明	Male			
Li Changxing	李长兴	Male			
Liu Beiwen	刘倍文	Male			
Liu Chuang	刘闯	Male			
Liu Guogang	刘国刚	Male			
Liu Tianlong	刘天龙	Male			
Liu Yue	刘悦	Male			
Liu Zhiqiang	刘治强	Male			
Liu Chuntao	柳春涛	Male			
Lu Yanhui	禄燕辉	Male			
Meng Zhanli	蒙占立	Male			
Peng Debao	彭德宝	Male			
Ren Yuhao	任宇浩	Male			
Song Fuchang	宋福昌	Male			
Song Tianyi	宋天意	Male			
Su Yang	苏杨	Male			
Sun Weiqi	孙伟奇	Male			
Wang Jun	王俊	Male			
Wang Quan	王全	Male			
Wang Shijie	王世杰	Male			
Sun Yunfei	孙云飞	Male			
Nie Quanxing	聂全星	Male			
Zhang Shengping	张圣平	Male			
Liu Mingyang	刘明阳	Male			
Wang Shengmin	王胜民	Male	17	Dezhou	Shandong
Jiang Liming	姜立铭	Male			
Li Mingxing	李明星	Male			
Li Zhi	李志	Male			
Wang Yu	王宇	Male			
Wei Junbing	魏俊冰	Male			
Xu Baolong	徐宝龙	Male			
Xu Ridong	徐日东	Male			
Yang Weiguang	杨伟光	Male			
Yu Xiaobo	余晓波	Male			
Yue Xiaoning	岳晓宁	Male			
Zhang Fu	张甫	Male			
Zhang Qian	张乾	Male			
Qiao Peng	乔鹏	Male			
Wang Mingyue	王明月	Male			
Zhou Qingshan	周青山	Male		Dezhou	Shandong
Zhang Sumei	张素梅	Female			
Xue Ning	薛宁	Male			
Yuan Jianjing	原建京	Male			
Yuan Xuxu	苑旭旭	Male			
Zhang Qi	张奇	Male			
Zhang Rutao	张如涛	Male			
Zhu Xiaowei	朱晓伟	Male			
Zhang Guangyang	张广杨	Male			
Zhang Mengyu	张梦宇	Male			
Zhao Jiaao	赵家澳	Male			
Zheng Guangliang	郑光亮	Male			
Zhu Jun	朱君	Male			

=== Presumed dead ===
Name	Chinese name	Gender		
Chang Jingli	常景立	Male		
Wang Shengpeng	王胜鹏	Male	Dezhou	Shandong
Wang Wenxu	王文旭	Male		
Wang Shaojie	王少杰	Male		
Wang Chunming	王春明	Male		

== Policemen ==
The Port of Tianjin Public Security Bureau's Police chief also suffered heavy injuries during the explosions, while deputy Chief Chen Jiahua was killed in the explosions

Name and rank	Chinese name	Gender	Age	Years of service	Unit	City	Province
Supervisor 1st class Chen Yongjun	陈勇军	Male	54	32	Port of Tianjin Public Security Bureau Firefighting division 1st Team (Former team leader)	Tianjin	
Supervisor 3rd Class Zhao Yong	赵勇	Male	42	12	Port of Tianjin Public Security Bureau Firefighting division Training office (former office leader)	Tianjin	
Supervisor 1st Class Zhang Gansheng	张干生	Male	51	29	Port of Tianjin Public Security Bureau Firefighting division 4th Team (Former deputy political commissar)		
Supervisor 1st Class Zhang Shaofeng	张少峰	Male	56	35	Port of Tianjin Public Security Bureau Firefighting division		
Supervisor 1st Class Gu Shoujian	谷守建	Male	54	33	Port of Tianjin Public Security Bureau Firefighting division	Tianjin	
Supervisor 2nd Class Zhao Fei	赵飞	Male	45	23	Port of Tianjin Public Security Bureau Firefighting division 5th team (former team leader)	Tianjin	
Supervisor 1st Class Chen Jiahua	陈嘉华	Male	44	21	Port of Tianjin Public Security Bureau Firefighting Division (Former deputy police chief and division Chief)		
Supervisor 2nd Class Zheng Guowang	郑国旺	Male	40	20	Port of Tianjin Public Security Bureau Command Center (former deputy command center leader)		
Supervisor 3rd Class Ning Shuwei	宁书伟	Male	36	16	Port of Tianjin Public Security Bureau Traffic police division 2nd team		
Supervisor 1st Class Liu Feng	刘峰	Male	48	24	Port of Tianjin Public Security Bureau Northern Port Area Division (Former Division Chief)		
Supervisor 3rd Class Wang Wanqiang	王万强	Male	38	16	Port of Tianjin Public Security Bureau Northern Port Area Division Yuejin Road station (Former political commissar)		
Supervisor 1st Class Lu Changjiang	陆长江	Male	53	16	Port of Tianjin Public Security Bureau Firefighting Division (former division political commissar)		

=== Port of Tianjin PSB 5th Firefighting team ===
All 25 firefighters of the Port of Tianjin PSB's 5th Firefighting team who were dispatched to the explosions were killed, along with all 6 fire engines of the unit being destroyed in the incident. The remaining members of the team, consisting of 1 political commissar, 3 firefighters, 3 policemen, 1 communications officer and 2 drivers were all off duty.

== Civilians ==
The vast majority of civilian casualties came from the storage workers at the port or family members of the firefighters, though some were also people living near the port.

=== Confirmed dead ===
Name	Chinese name	Gender	City	Province
Qi Xinli	齐新利	Male	Tianjin	
Wang Yunliang	王运良	Male	Puyang	Henan
Han Zhenchao	韩贞超	Male	Puyang	Henan
He Yongjun	贺勇军	Male	Anyang	Henan
Zhou Jiuru	周久儒	Male	Jinzhou	Liaoning
Zhi Chaoming	智超鸣	Male	Tianjin	
Bi Shengwu	毕胜武	Male	Xingtai	Hebei
Meng Xiancai	孟贤财	Male	Qingdao	Shandong
Qiao Gang	乔刚	Male	Tianjin	
Cheng Haibin	程海彬	Male	Tai'an	Shandong
Zhu Yawei	朱亚伟	Male	Shijiazhuang	Hebei
Bi Xinghu	毕星虎	Male	Xingtai	Hebei
Zhao Jianqiang	赵建强	Male	Xingtai	Hebei
Zhang Hui	张辉	Male	Zaozhuang	Shandong
Wu Dekui	武德魁	Male	Hegang	Heilongjiang
Li Quansheng	李全胜	Male	Tianjin	
Zou Shiqiang	邹士强	Male	Xuzhou	Jiangsu
Nie Yun	聂云	Male	Jinzhong	Shanxi
Chen Yougui	陈友桂	Male	Xiaogan	Hubei
Wang Lili	王莉莉	Female	Dezhou	Shandong
Fan Ruliang	范如亮	Male	Dezhou	Shandong
Zhang Xiaojun	张晓军	Male	Tianjin	
Tian Yuanhua	田元华	Female	Jilin	Jilin
Zhang Chi	张驰	Female	Zhangjiakou	Hebei
Liu Hailong	刘海龙	Male	Chengde	Hebei
Yang Xiuyuan	杨修远	Male	Tianjin	
Li Hongqiang	李红强	Female	Shijiazhuang	Hebei
Liu Jianjian	刘剑剑	Male	Tai'an	Shandong
Wang Zhongqi	王忠琪	Male	Liaoyang	Liaoning
Ma Yanqiu	马艳秋	Male	Cangzhou	Hebei
Ma Shufang	马书芳	Female	Xianyang	Shaanxi
Wang Yonggang	王永刚	Male	Tianjin	
Shi Yuzhang	史玉章	Male	Tianjin	
Li Wei	李伟	Male	Tianjin	
Li Yuan	李媛	Female	Tianjin	
Wang Wenwu	王文武	Male	Tianjin	
Luo Yunming	罗云溟	Male	Tianjin	
Zhang Qiangmin	张强民	Male	Binzhou	Shandong
Liu Huili	刘会利	Male	Binzhou	Shandong
Ma Fengjiang	马风江	Male	Binzhou	Shandong
Si Jianchun	司建春	Male	Binzhou	Shandong
Zhang Jiangguo	张建国	Male	Binzhou	Shandong
Zhao Jirong	赵吉荣	Male	Binzhou	Shandong
Fang Zhiqiang	方志强	Male	Binzhou	Shandong
Ding Jianlun	丁建论	Male	Binzhou	Shandong
Yang Dayan	杨大炎	Male	Jiujiang	Jiangxi
Xi Yuanrong	习远荣	Male	Zhaotong	Yunnan
Yang Yunlong	杨运龙	Male	Fuqing	Fuzhou
Yang Huiling	杨会玲	Female	Kaifeng	Henan
Li Wenyun	李文芸	Female	Zhangjiakou	Hebei
Chai Yueguo	柴跃国	Male	Xingtai	Hebei
Li Jianhui	李建辉	Male	Xingtai	Hebei
Zhang Yang	张扬	Male	Tianjin	
Wang Zhichun	王之春	Male	Jining	Shandong
Ma Ran	马然	Male	Siping	Jilin

=== Presumed dead ===
Name	Chinese name	Gender	City	Province
Cao Zhende	曹振德	Male	Tianjin	
Hu Mingyi	胡明益	Male	Tianjin	
Wei Haochen	魏浩晨	Male	Dezhou	Shandong

== Identification of victims and casualty count ==
The full list of casualties, including those missing presumed dead, was released on September 11, 2016, after it was determined that the remaining 8 people missing likely had not survived.

== Posthumous awards ==
On September 9, 2016, all firefighters and police killed during the explosion posthumously received martyr status and 2.3 million RMB in compensation.

All 24 CFS firefighters posthumously received the Medal of Devotion for National Defense. Additionally, all 8 firefighters from the 8th Street company who died posthumously received 1st Class Meritorious Services Medals.

=== Legal status of Port of Tianjin Public Security Bureau firefighters and police ===
The volunteer firefighters and private police of the Port of Tianjin Public Security Bureau were technically employees of the Port of Tianjin which meant they were not public employees and were non-staff personnel, leading to questions about their eligibility for posthumous awards. When asked about this by journalists on the 16th of August, then-premier Li Keqiang responded:

Both active service and volunteer firefighters involved in the disaster relief [after the explosions] have received training, they knew the fire would be dangerous, but chose to keep the danger to them [and performed their duties]. Their sacrifice makes us heartbroken. They are all heroes, there is no such thing as "non-staff" in heroes! (参加施救的现役和非现役消防人员都受过培训，他们明知火场有危险，但把危险留给自己。他们的牺牲让我们痛心。他们都是英雄，英雄没有“编外”！)

Li Keqiang also said that both active service and volunteer firefighters should receive the same treatment in terms of awards and condolences, as they performed the same duties. On September 9, 2016, all volunteer firefighters were given martyr status along with standard firefighters, with each of their families receiving 2.3 million RMB in compensation.

== See also ==
- List of People's Armed Police personnel killed in the line of duty
- Casualties of the September 11 attacks
- Line of duty death
- 2019 Muli wildifires - Single incident with most Chinese firefighters killed since the 2015 explosions
