= Bohai Bank Tower =

Coordinates: 39.1287°N 117.2152°E

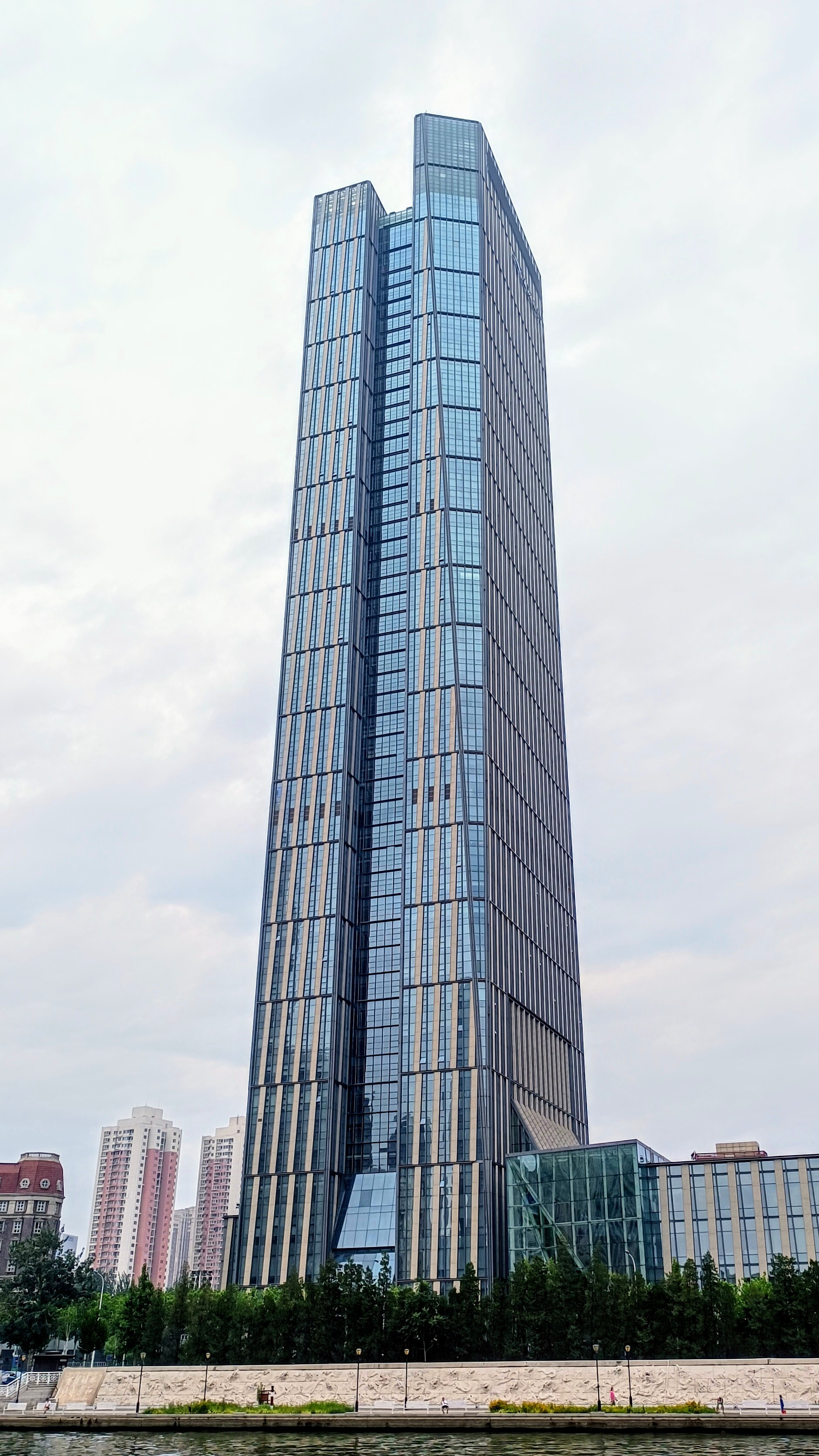
- Interactive map of the Bohai Bank Tower area

General information
- Status: Completed
- Type: Commercial
- Location: Tianjin, China
- Opening: 2015

Height
- Roof: 886 ft (270 m)

Technical details
- Floor count: 55

Design and construction
- Architect: RMJM
- Main contractor: China State Construction Engineering Corporation

Bohai Bank Tower is a skyscraper in Tianjin, China. The 55-story building was completed in 2015, construction having begun in 2010. The building houses the headquarters of China Bohai Bank.

== See also ==
- Skyscraper design and construction
- List of tallest buildings in China
