= TEDA Soccer Stadium =

Football stadium in Tianjin, China

Coordinates: 39°1′49.87″N 117°43′8.40″E

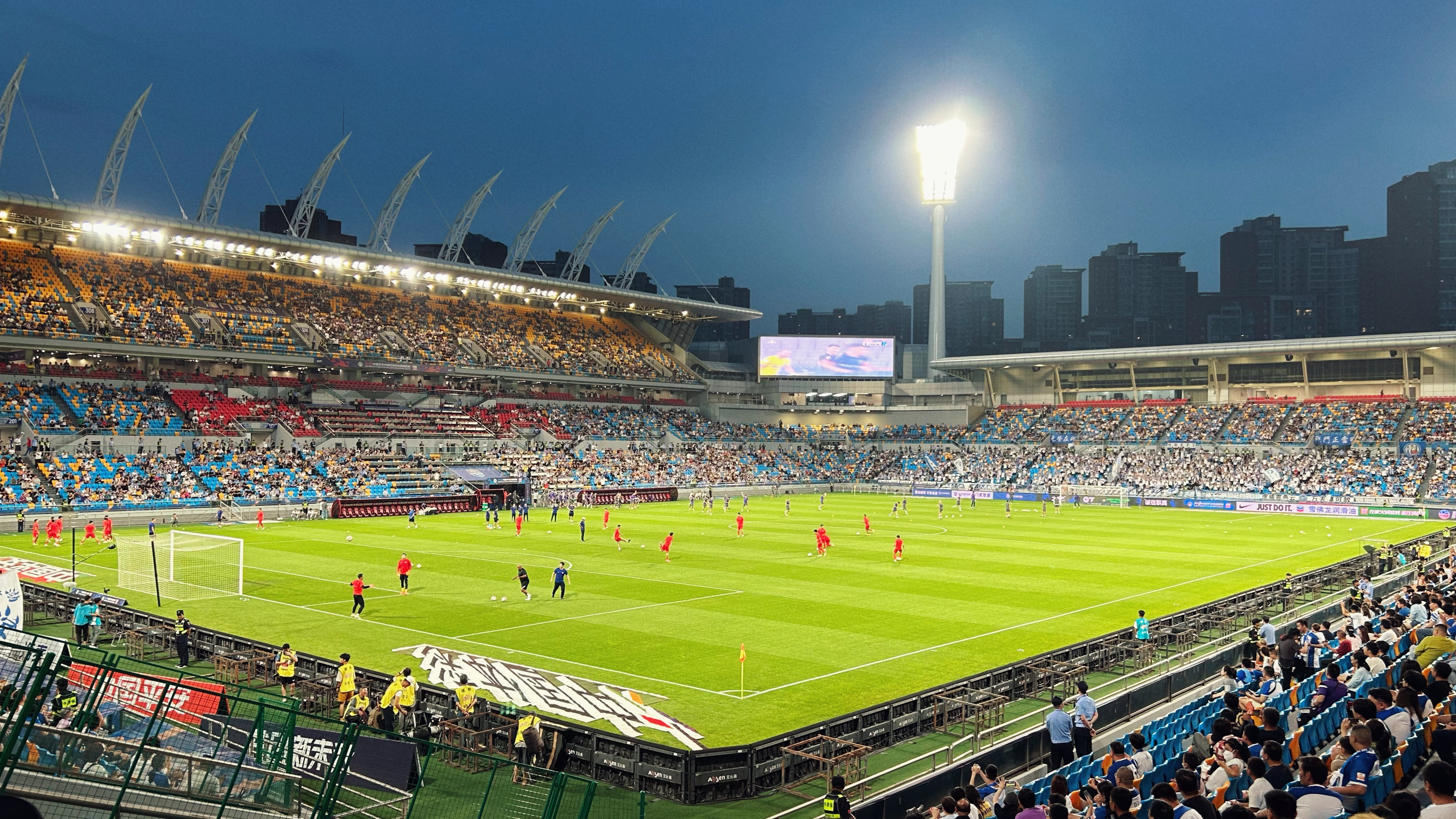
- The stadium on a matchday in August 2023
- Interactive map of TEDA Soccer Stadium
- Location: Tianjin Economic-Technological Development Area, Tanggu District, Tianjin, China
- Owner: Tianjin Economic Development Agency (TEDA) Investment Holding Co. Ltd.
- Capacity: 36,390
- Surface: Grass
- Public transit: at Huizhanzhongxin

Construction
- Built: 16 August 2002
- Opened: 15 May 2004
- Cost: $55 million
- Architect: Peddle Thorp

Tenant
- Tianjin Jinmen Tiger (2004–2014, 2023–present)

TEDA Soccer Stadium (simplified Chinese: 泰达足球场; traditional Chinese: 泰達足球場; pinyin: Tàidá Zúqiú Chǎng) is a football stadium in Tianjin, China. It is the home of the Tianjin Jinmen Tigers. The stadium holds 36,390 people and was built in 2004. The stadium is located in the Tianjin Economic-Technological Development Area (TEDA), and was designed by Peddle Thorp Architects, an Australian architecture firm.

It was largely destroyed by 2015 explosions, then started re-construction working in 2017. Reconstruction work completed on 21 July 2023.

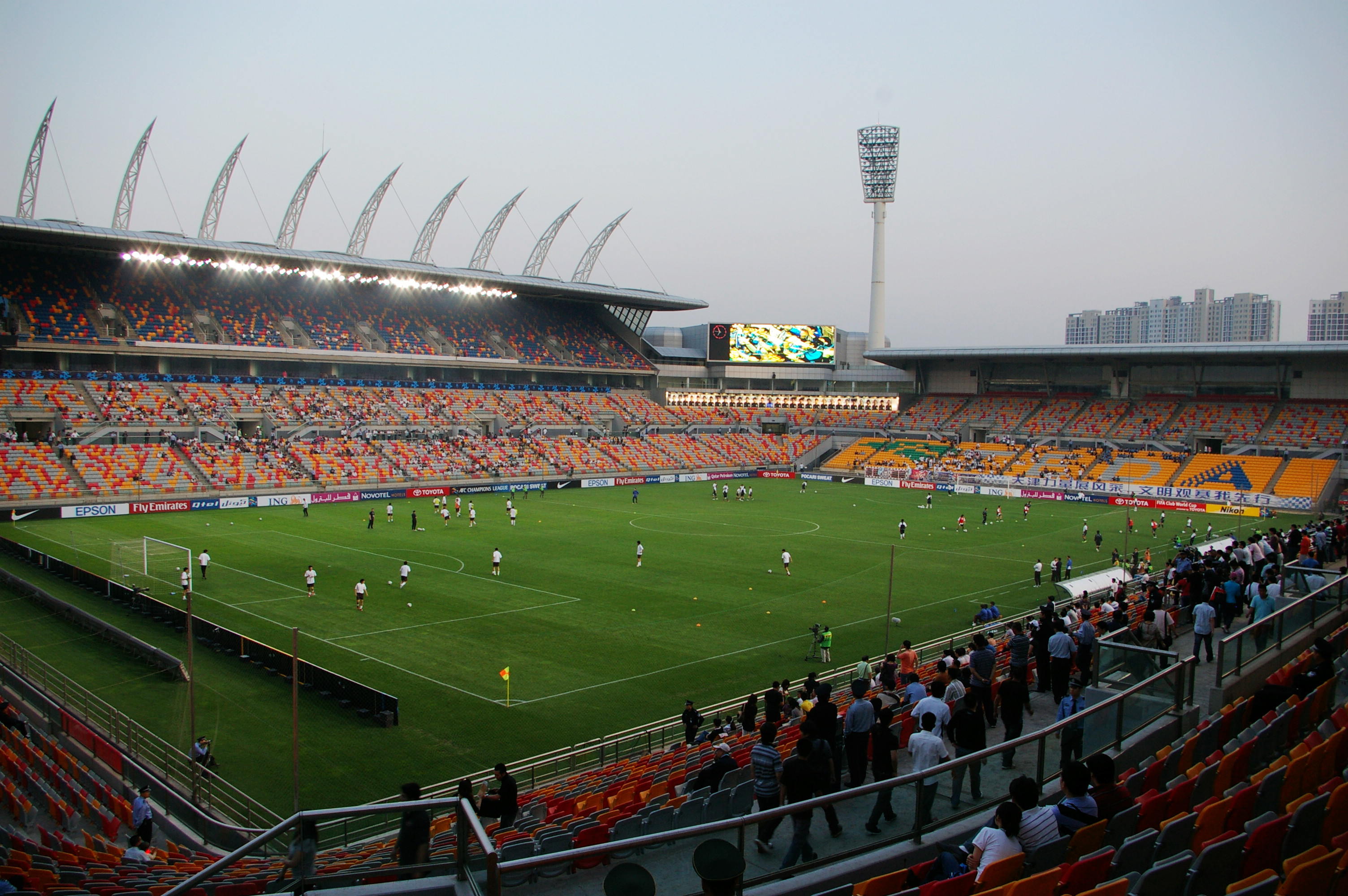
Stadium in 2009.

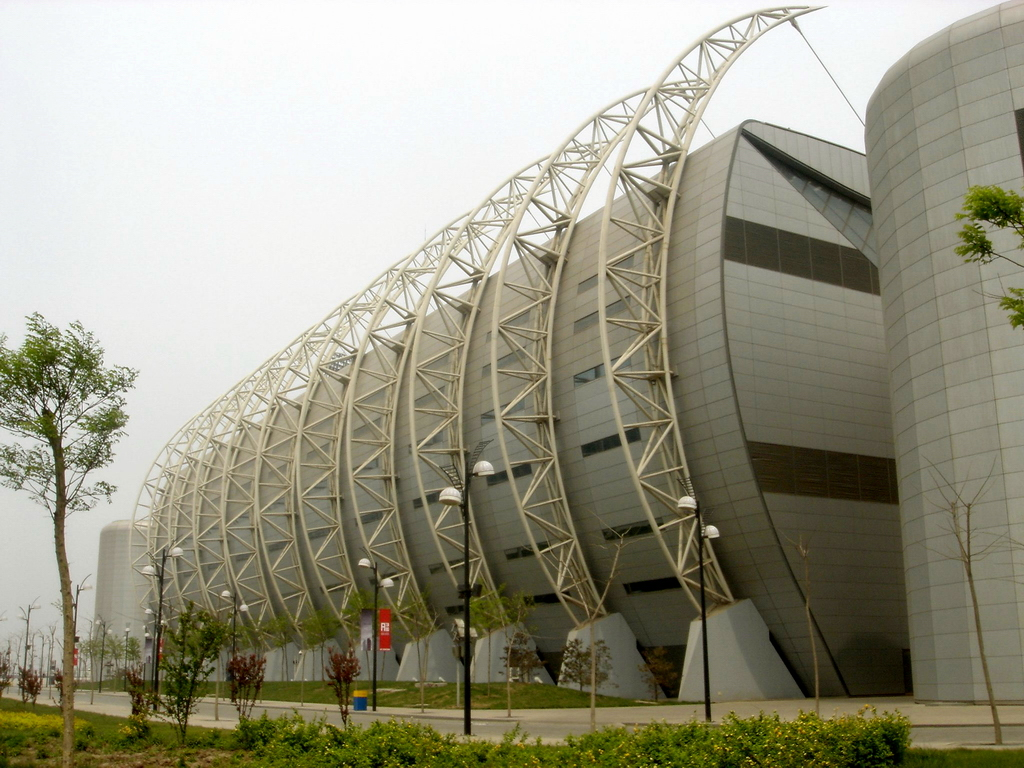
Outside the stadium.

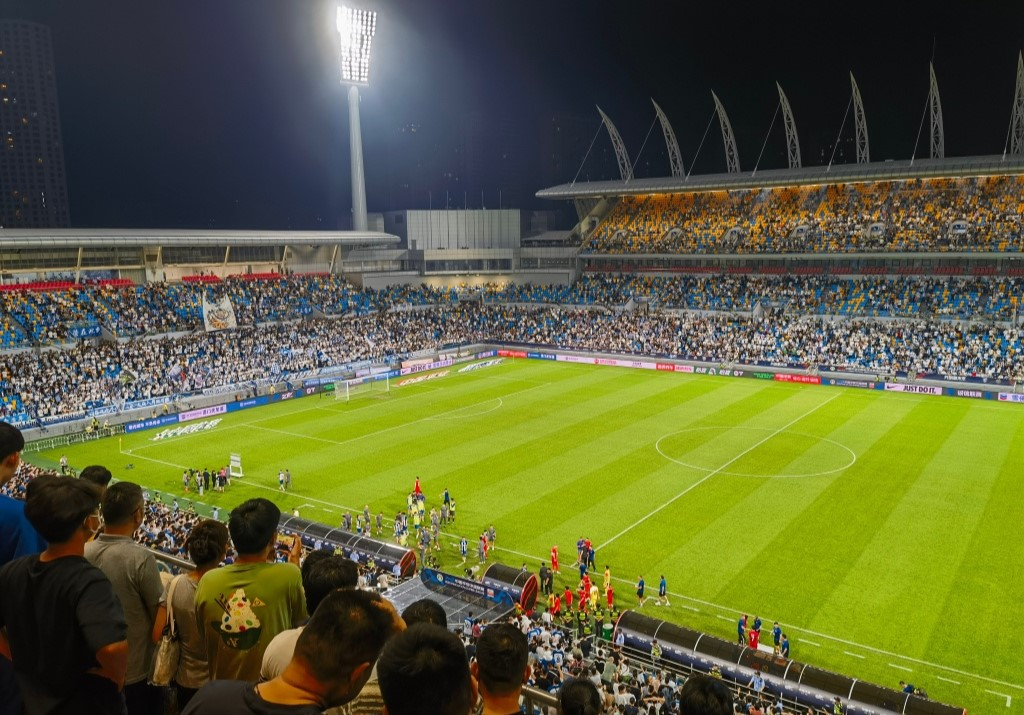
The stadium in May 2023

== See also ==
- Lists of stadiums
