= China Bohai Bank =

Chinese commercial bank

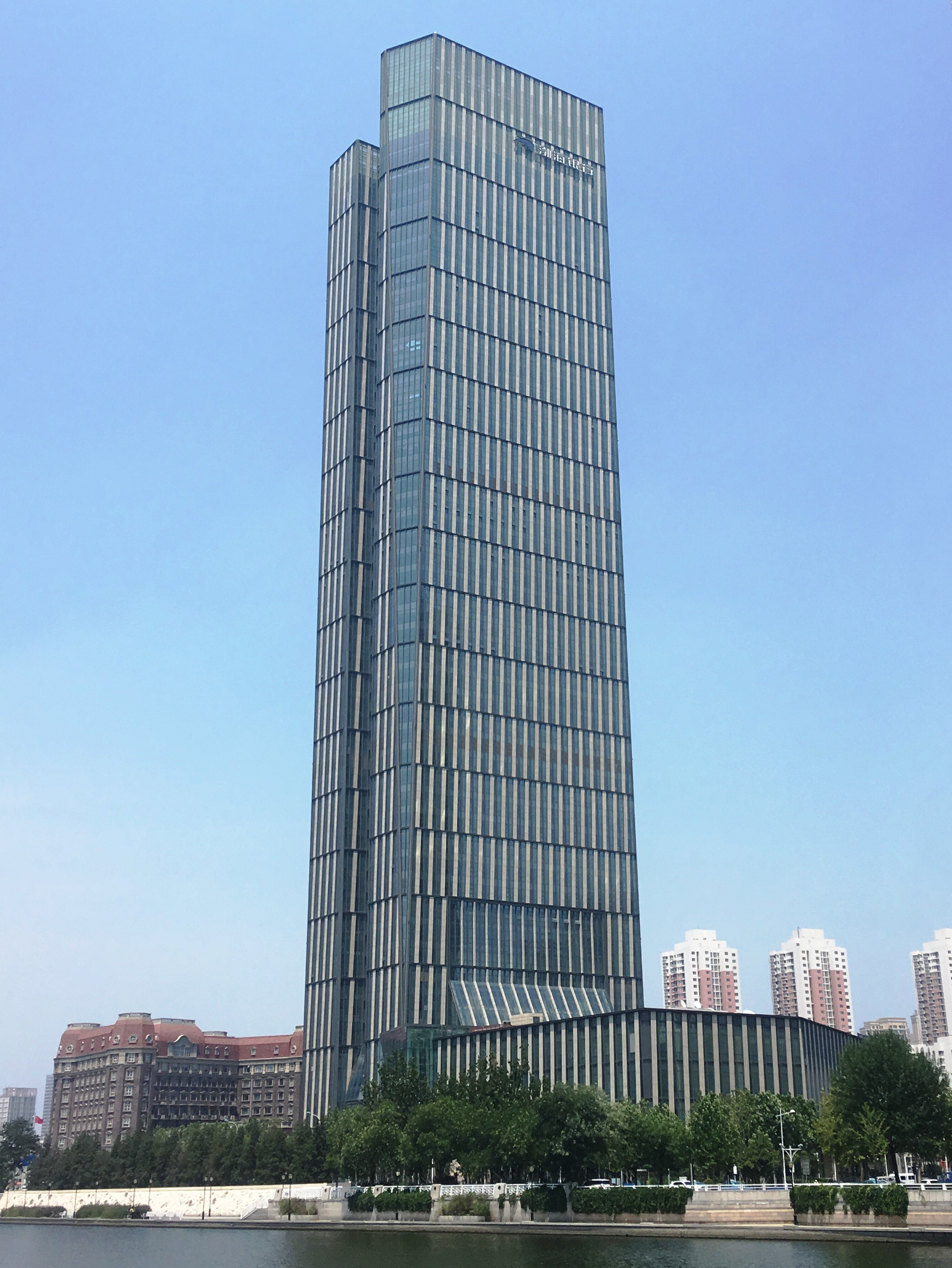
- Headquarter in Tianjin
- Company type: Joint-stock company; indirect state-owned enterprise
- Industry: Financial services
- Founded: 30 December 2005; 20 years ago
- Headquarters: 218 Haihe East Road, Hedong District, Tianjin, China
- Services: Retail and corporate banking
- Revenue: 53,439,780,000 renminbi (2018)
- Operating income: ▲CN¥7.1 billion (2015)
- Net income: ▲CN¥5.7 billion (2015)
- Total assets: ▲CN¥764.2 billion (2015)
- Total equity: ▲CN¥35.6 billion (2015)
- Owner: TEDA Holding (25.00%); Standard Chartered HK (19.99%); China COSCO Shipping (13.67%); SDIC (11.67%); Baosteel Group (11.67%); Tianjin Trust (10.00%); Tianjin Shanghui Investment (8.00%)
- Capital ratio: 7.75% (CET1)
- Website: cbhb.com.cn
- Footnotes / references source

China Bohai Bank (simplified Chinese: 渤海银行; traditional Chinese: 渤海銀行; pinyin: Bóhǎi Yĺnháng) is a commercial bank in Tianjin, China. Established on December 31, 2005, and opened for business in February 2006. The bank had a registered capital of CN¥8.5 billion and net equity of CN¥35.6 billion as of 31 December 2015.

== History ==
The bank was the brainchild of the Tianjin mayor (and previous head of the People's Bank of China) Dai Xianglong who turned a national banking licence for Tianjin, that had been promised to the city in the mid-1990s, into reality and in the process kicking off an important upgrading of the Tianjin financial system. This was the 1st national banking licence to have been approved by the State Council since China Minsheng Bank in 1995.

The precondition for the national licence, stipulated by the regulators, was that foreign expertise should be brought in to ensure that the bank could herald a new era for Chinese banking following the modern organisational design of western banks, in particular the risk management system and product development approach.

In turn a small set up team was formed from local bank officials, led by Mr Sun Li Guo, and a beauty contest was held for the foreign banking partner. Standard Chartered Hong Kong was selected as Strategic investor and a 19.99% shareholding was agreed. Other investors included TEDA Holding, COSCO, Baosteel Group, State Development & Investment Corporation, with TEDA taking the lead role with a 25% shareholding.

The first appointed official of the bank was from Standard Chartered, an Englishman, Mr Simon Page, the chief risk officer who took up the post in October 2004. The head of Wholesale Bank was a Swiss national, Mr Rolf Berweger. A group of officials and technical experts from Standard Chartered Bank joined the set up team and the preparation for the bank began under the guidance of the project director Mr Clive Haswell, pulling together business strategy, technical & IT infrastructure, policies and procedures.

In August 2005, the chairman and chief executive were selected, Mr Yang Zi Lin and Mr Ma Teng and the business licence was approved on 31 December 2005. The chief financial officer, Mrs Guo Rong Li, chief technology officer, Mr Liu Zheng Quan, head of Consumer Bank, Mr Phang Yew Kiat were also appointed.

The first branch opened in Tianjin on 16 February 2006 and offered basic retail banking deposit services and corporate banking lending, trade and deposit services.
