= TEDA International School =

Location
- No. 72, Third Ave. Tianjin Economic-Technological Development Area; Tianjin, 300457; China

Information
- Type: Day school
- Motto: Empowered to become citizens the world needs
- Founded: 1995
- Head of school: Joseph J. Azmeh
- Grades: Pre K-12
- Enrollment: 225
- Language: English
- Colors: Blue, grey, and green
- Slogan: Empowering students to become citizens the world needs
- Sports: Soccer, volleyball, basketball, badminton, table tennis, etc.
- Team name: TEDA Comets
- Accreditation: WASC
- Affiliation: EARCOS, ACAMIS
- Website: https://www.tedais.net/

TEDA International School (simplified Chinese: 泰达国际学校; traditional Chinese: 泰達國際學校) is an English language day school located in Tianjin Economic Development Area of China.

The school was established by the TEDA Government in 1995, and is open to any foreigners residing in TEDA. Its campus consists of six modern, climate-controlled buildings housing general classrooms; science labs; computer labs; library/media center; ESL classrooms; a full-sized gymnasium and a large cafeteria. The campus grounds are a park-like setting that includes a playground, a football field, and a track.

The School is a member of EARCOS (East Asia Regional Council of Overseas Schools) and is accredited by WASC. TIS is also a member of the Association of China and Mongolia International Schools (ACAMIS) and participates in intramural sports and cultural activities regularly through this organization.
