= Tianjin Junlin Tianxia Building =

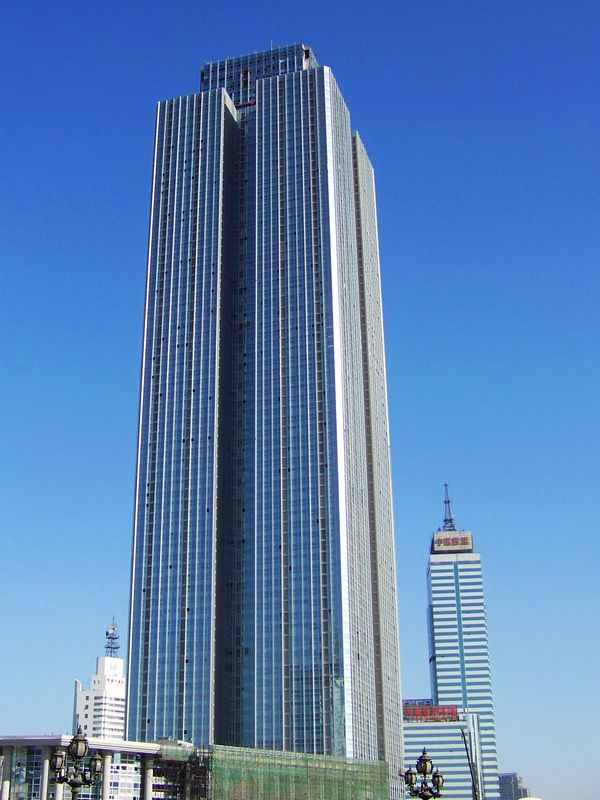
- Interactive map of the Tianjin Junlin Tianxia Building area

General information
- Status: Completed
- Type: Commercial
- Location: Tianjin, China
- Opening: 2010

Height
- Roof: 784 ft (239 m)

Technical details
- Floor count: 64

Design and construction
- Developer: Tianjin Star Real Estate Development

Tianjin Junlin Tianxia Building is a skyscraper in Tianjin, China. The 64 story building was completed in 2010, construction having begun in 2007.

== See also ==
- Skyscraper design and construction
- List of tallest buildings in China
