= State Development and Investment Corporation =

State investment company in China

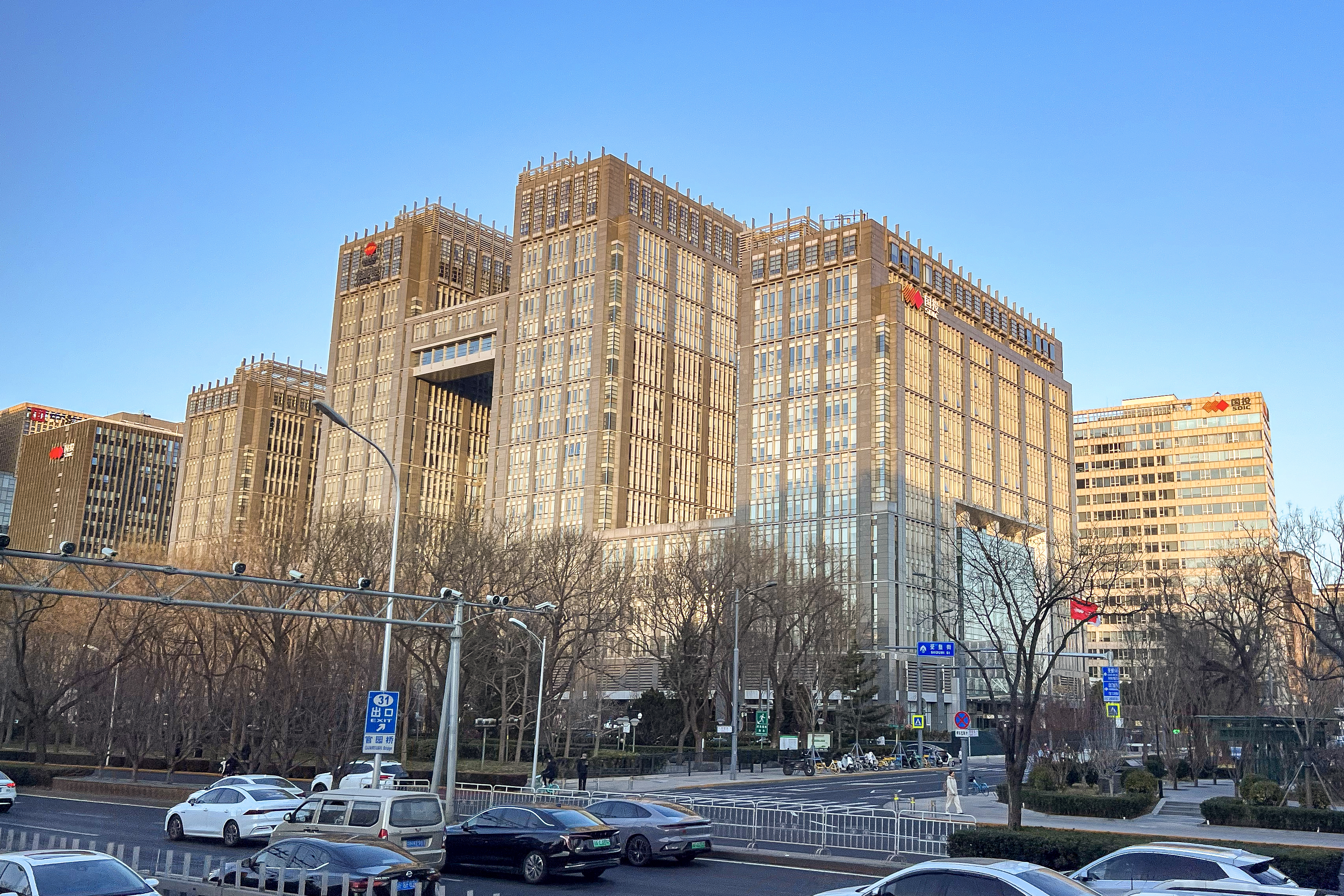
- Headquarters of SDIC
- Native name: 国家开发投资公司
- Company type: State-owned enterprise
- Industry: Investment management
- Founded: 5 May 1995; 31 years ago
- Headquarters: Beijing, China
- Key people: Fu Gangfeng (Chairman)
- Revenue: ¥194.5 billion RMB (2021)
- Net income: ¥46.1 billion RMB (2021)
- Total assets: ¥766.4 billion RMB (2021)
- Number of employees: 50,000 (2021)
- Website: www.sdic.com.cn

State Development and Investment Corporation (SDIC) (国家开发投资公司) is the largest state-owned investment holding company in China. It was established on 5 May 1995. SDIC's industrial investment mainly goes to power generation, coal mining, ports and shipping, chemical fertilizer production, and other infrastructure or resource-oriented fields as well as high-tech projects.

As a pilot company in state-owned assets management appointed by State-owned Assets Supervision and Administration Commission (SASAC) of the State Council of China, SDIC plays a role in optimizing the structure of state sector of the economy.
