= Jin Wan Plaza 2 =

Skyscraper in Tianjin, China

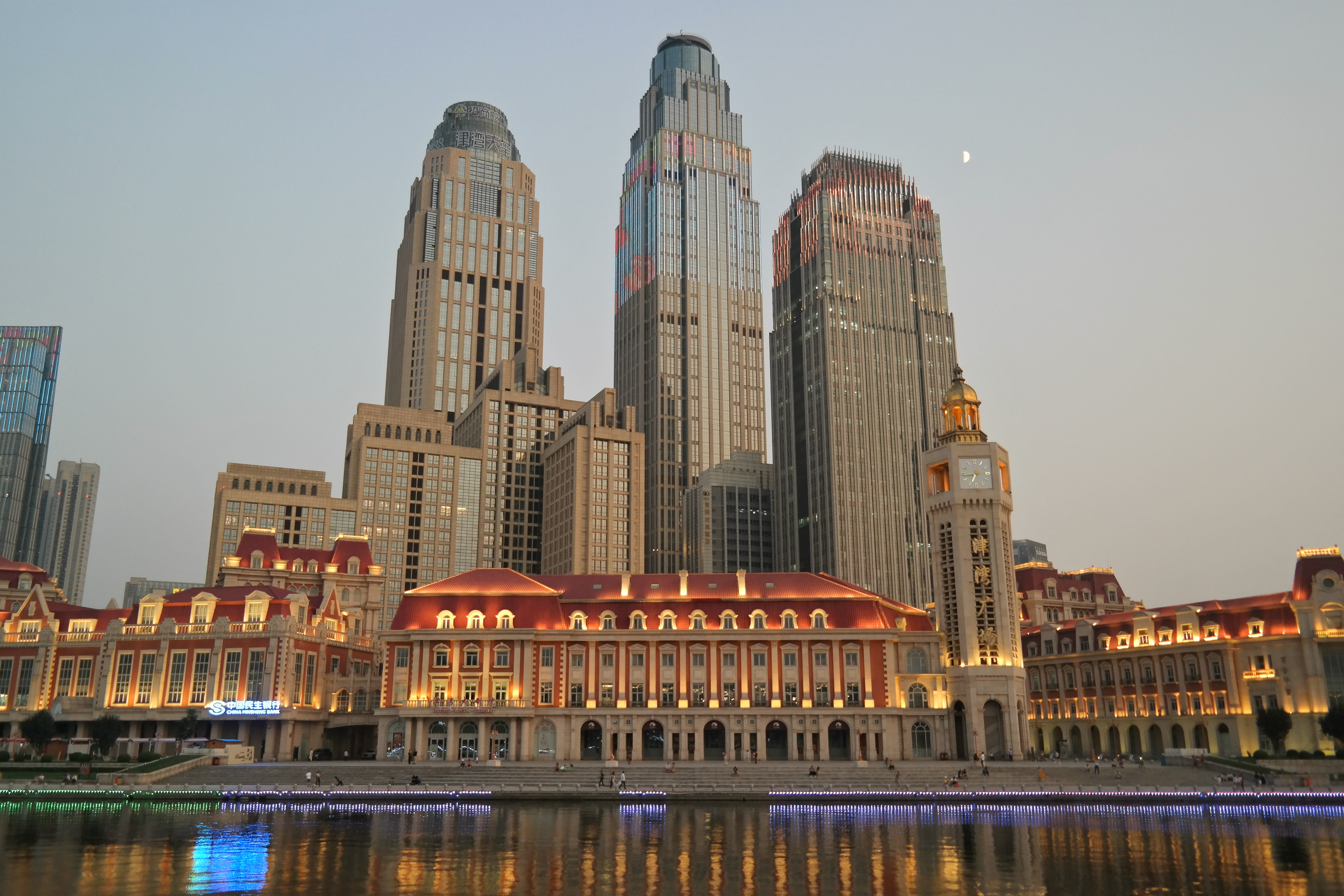

General information
- Status: Completed
- Type: Commercial
- Location: Tianjin, China
- Opening: 2015

Height
- Roof: 787 ft (240 m)

Technical details
- Floor count: 58

Jin Wan Plaza 2 is a skyscraper in Tianjin, China. The 58-story building was completed in 2015, construction having begun in 2011.

== See also ==
- Skyscraper design and construction
- List of tallest buildings in China
