= Shangbang Leasing Tower =

Coordinates: 38.9978°N 117.6832°E

General information
- Status: Completed
- Type: Commercial
- Location: Tianjin, China
- Opening: 2016

Height
- Roof: 807 ft (246 m)

Technical details
- Floor count: 54

Shangbang Leasing Tower is a skyscraper in Tianjin, China. The 54 story building was completed in 2016, construction having begun in 2010.

== See also ==
- Skyscraper design and construction
- List of tallest buildings in China
