= Centre Plaza (Tianjin) =

- Interactive map of the Centre Plaza area

General information
- Location: Tianjin, China
- Coordinates: 39°06′57.9″N 117°12′44.4″E
- Completed: 2004

Height
- Antenna spire: 238 m (781 ft)

Technical details
- Floor count: 51

Centre Plaza
- Simplified Chinese: 信达广场
- Traditional Chinese: 信達廣場
Transcriptions
Standard Mandarin
- Hanyu Pinyin: Xìndá guǎngchǎng

Centre Plaza is a 51-floor, 238-metre (781 ft)-tall skyscraper completed in 2004 located in Tianjin, China.

The building was constructed by a joint venture of Shun Tak Tianjin Investment (Chinese: 信德(天津投资)), a company indirectly owned by Shun Tak Holdings (Chinese: 信德集团; pinyin: Xìndé jítuán) for 50% non-voting deferred shares (another 50% from an unknown British Virgin Islands investor) and Tianjin TEDA Group (Chinese: 天津泰达集团; pinyin: Tiānjīn tàidá, a wholly owned subsidiary of TEDA Holding), thus the Chinese name of the property was an acronym that took one word each from the two companies. It includes offices and residences.

The original shareholders of the developer was also included Zhongyuan General Merchandise.

== See also ==
- List of tallest buildings in China
- List of tallest buildings in the world
