= Changjiang Securities =

Chinese securities company

Changjiang Securities Company Limited 長江證券股份有限公司
- Company type: State-owned enterprise
- Industry: Securities
- Founded: 1988
- Headquarters: Wuhan, Hubei, People's Republic of China
- Area served: People's Republic of China
- Key people: Chairman: Mr. Hu Yunzhao
- Website: Changjiang Securities Company Limited

Changjiang Securities Company Limited (SZSE: 000783) is a securities company headquartered in Wuhan, Hubei, China. It involves commission sales and purchase of securities, agency of debt services and dividend distribution of securities, custody and authentication of securities, agency of registration and accounts opening, self-support sales and purchase of securities, underwriting of securities, consulting of securities investment and trustee investment management. It has a network of 16 branches, 148 securities sales departments, and 17 futures business departments across the country.

The company was established in 1988, which used to be Hubei Securities Company. It was renamed "Changjiang Securities Company Limited" in 2002. In 2007, it achieved a backdoor listing through a merger with Shijiazhuang Petrochemical Company Limited, a subsidiary of Sinopec.
