= Tianjin TEDA Company =

Tianjin TEDA Co., Ltd.
- company logo
- Company type: public
- Traded as: SZSE: 000652
- Industry: Conglomerate
- Founded: 20 July 1992
- Headquarters: Tianjin, China
- Area served: China
- Key people: Hu Jun (chairman)
- Revenue: ▲CN¥9.7 billion (2015)
- Operating income: ▼CN¥348.6 million (2015)
- Net income: ▲CN¥254.7 million (2015)
- Total assets: ▲CN¥28.6 billion (2015)
- Total equity: ▲CN¥3.1 billion (2015)
- Owner: TEDA Group (32.90%); others (67.10%)
- Website: tedastock.com
- Footnotes / references in a consolidated basis

Tianjin TEDA Co., Ltd.
- Simplified Chinese: 天津泰达股份有限公司
- Traditional Chinese: 天津泰達股份有限公司
Transcriptions
Standard Mandarin
- Hanyu Pinyin: Tiānjīn tàidá gǔfèn yǒuxiàn gōngsī

Tianjin TEDA Co., Ltd. is a Chinese conglomerate based in Tianjin, China which engaged in many business areas. It is involved in the businesses of garments, ecological products, transportation operations, medicines and nutrition products.

TEDA is the acronym of Tianjin Economic-Technological Development Area.

As at 8 November 2016, Tianjin TEDA is a consistent of SZSE Component Index but not in SZSE 300 Index, making the company was ranked between the 301st to 500th by free float adjusted market capitalization.

== History ==
The predecessor of the company was founded on 20 July 1992 (as Chinese: 天津美纶股份有限公司). In 1996 the shares of the company was started to float on the Shenzhen Stock Exchange. In 1997 it was takeover by TEDA Group (Chinese: 天津泰达集团有限公司) from Tianjin Textile Industry Corporation (Chinese: 天津市纺织工业总公司) as a reverse IPO.

In the same year the company was renamed into Tianjin TEDA Co., Ltd. (Chinese: 天津泰达股份有限公司).

old logo
