= TEDA Holding =

Chinese state-owned enterprise based in Tianjin

- Company type: State-owned enterprise
- Headquarters: 9 Shengda Street, TEDA, Tianjin, China
- Area served: China
- Revenue: ▼CN¥52.3 billion (2015)
- Operating income: ▼ (CN¥111.8 million) (2015)
- Net income: ▲CN¥693.2 million (2015)
- Total assets: ▲CN¥298.3 billion (2015)
- Total equity: ▲CN¥43.4 billion (2015)
- Owner: Tianjin Government (100%)
- Parent: Tianjin SASAC

Chinese name
- Simplified Chinese: 天津泰达投资控股有限公司
- Traditional Chinese: 天津泰達投資控股有限公司
- Literal meaning: Tianjin TEDA Investment Holding Limited Company
Transcriptions
Standard Mandarin
- Hanyu Pinyin: Tiānjīn tàidá tóuzī kònggǔ yǒuxiàn gōngsī

Chinese short name
- Simplified Chinese: 泰达控股
- Traditional Chinese: 泰達控股
Transcriptions
Standard Mandarin
- Hanyu Pinyin: Tàidá kònggǔ
- Website: teda.com.cn
- Footnotes / references in consolidated financial statement

TEDA Investment Holding Co., Ltd., known as TEDA Holding, is a Chinese state-owned enterprise based in Tianjin. The company was supervised by the State-owned Assets Supervision and Administration Commission (SASAC) of Tianjin Government.

TEDA was the acronym of Tianjin Economic-Technological Development Area. The Chinese name 泰达 (pinyin: Tài dá) was in turn the transliteration of TEDA.

== History ==
TEDA Holding (Chinese: 天津泰达投资控股有限公司), as the name suggested, was originally related to Tianjin Economic-Technological Development Area (Chinese: 天津经济技术开发区; acronym TEDA) as an investment vehicle of Tianjin Municipal People's Government. It was founded in 1984, after the Reform and opening up. It was renamed to the current name (from 天津经济技术开发区总公司) in 2001, after a merger with sister company TEDA Group (Chinese: 泰达集团) and Tianjin TEDA Construction Group (Chinese: 天津泰达建设集团).

It was later expended to multiple sector, which now included football club, securities trading services, trust investment company and steel manufacturing.

== Subsidiaries ==
- Tianjin TEDA Group (100%)
  - Tianjin TEDA Company (32.90%)
- Tianjin TEDA F.C. (85.4%)
- Tianjin Pipe Corporation (57%)
- Northern International Trust

== Equity investments ==
- Centre Plaza (Tianjin) (37%)
- China Bohai Bank (25%)
- Changjiang Securities

== Financial data ==
Years	Turnovers	Results	Total Assets	Net Assets
2011	¥58.4 billion	¥32.8 million	¥180.8 billion	¥29.0 billion
2012	▲¥64.6 billion	▲¥102.1 million	▲¥200.2 billion	▲¥29.9 billion
2013				
2014				
2015				
