= Tianjin Economic-Technological Development Area =

Main free market zone in Binhai, Tianjin, China

Coordinates: 39°02′12″N 117°42′02″E

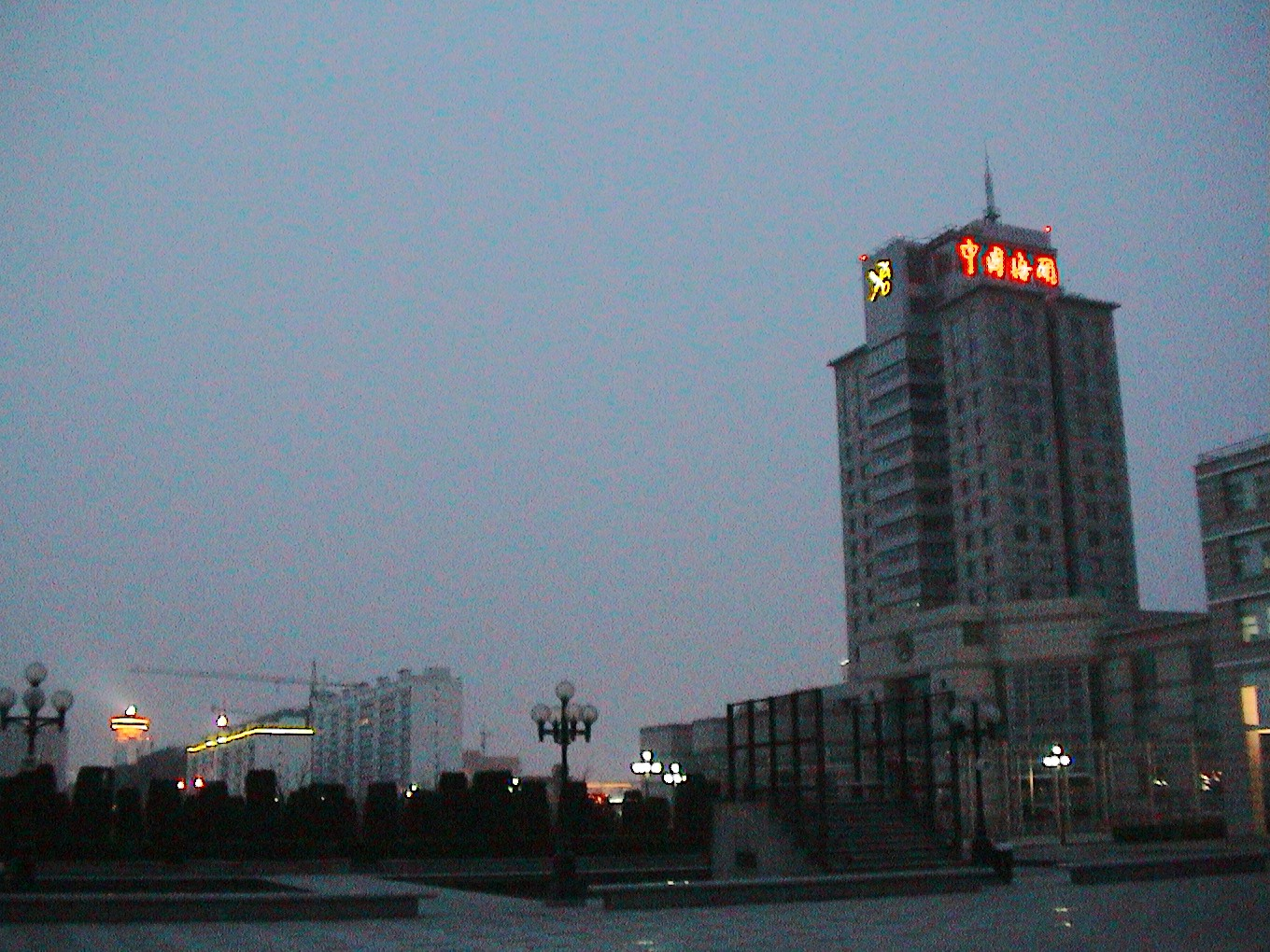
TEDA customs, Tianjin (2003)

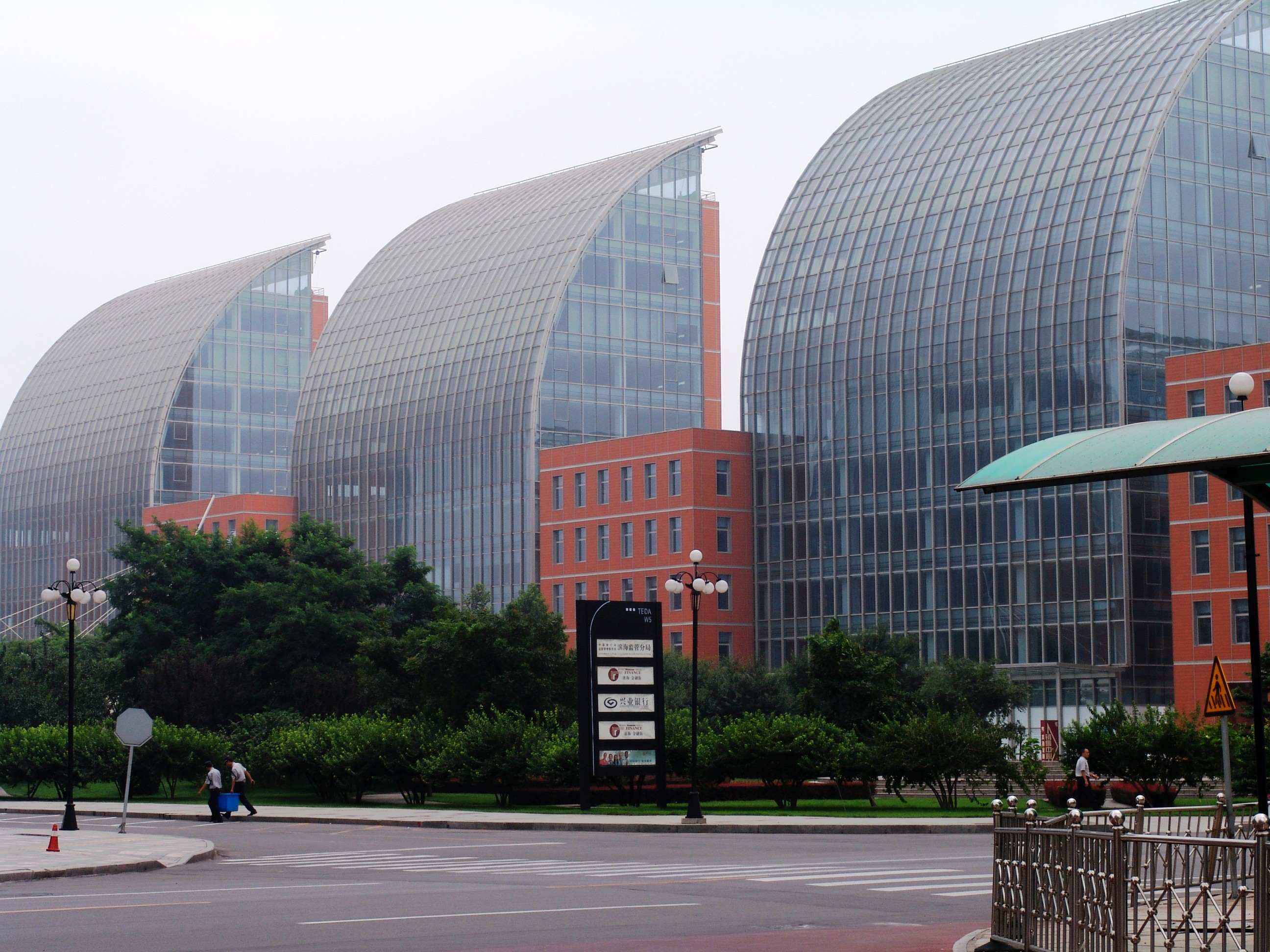
TEDA finance street, Tianjin (2004)

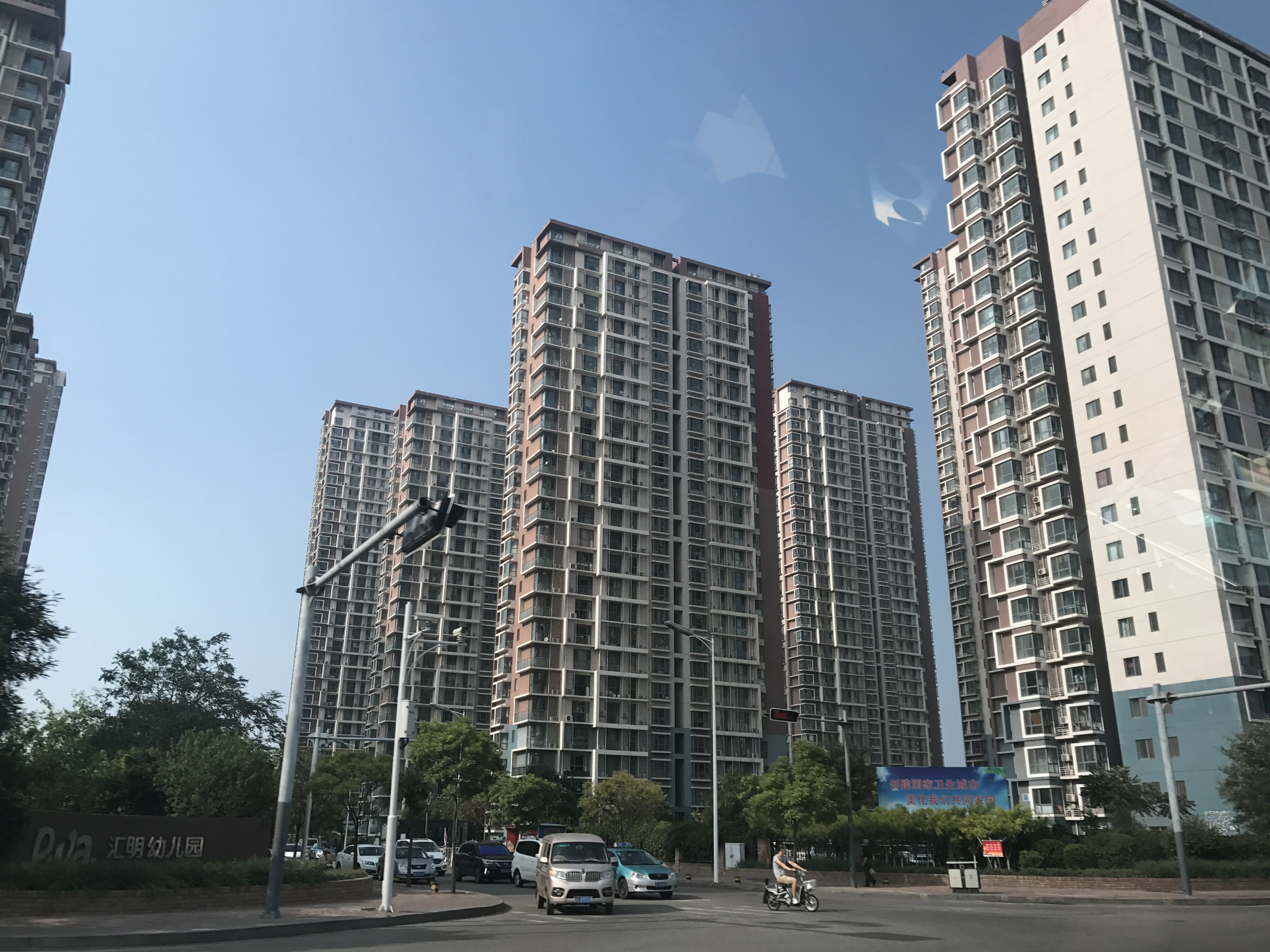
Apartment-style housing - June 2017

Tianjin Economic-Technological Development Area (Chinese: 天津经济技术开发区; pinyin: tiānjīn jīngjì jìshù kāifā qū) is the main free market zone in Binhai, Tianjin, China. It was formed in late 1984.

== History ==
The area was created in late 1984. Since 1997, the Ministry of Commerce (MOFCOM, the former Ministry of Economy and Foreign Trade) started a comprehensive appraisal on investment environment of all national-level development zones which covers eight major indicators like overall economic strength, infrastructure, operation cost, human resources and supply, society and environment, facilitation for technology innovation, management system building, and development and efficiency. For 12 consecutive years, TEDA topped the list. It is a leading investment spot and the Asia-Pacific at large.

TEDA, pronounced nearly the same in Mandarin Chinese, is a vast area by the seaside. It contains a port, business buildings, urban residential areas, and an extensive transportation network. TEDA also contains the TEDA Football Stadium, used by Tianjin's football team, Tianjin Teda FC. The stadium was finished in 2004.

The area's largest bridge is the Haihe toll bridge.

== Location ==
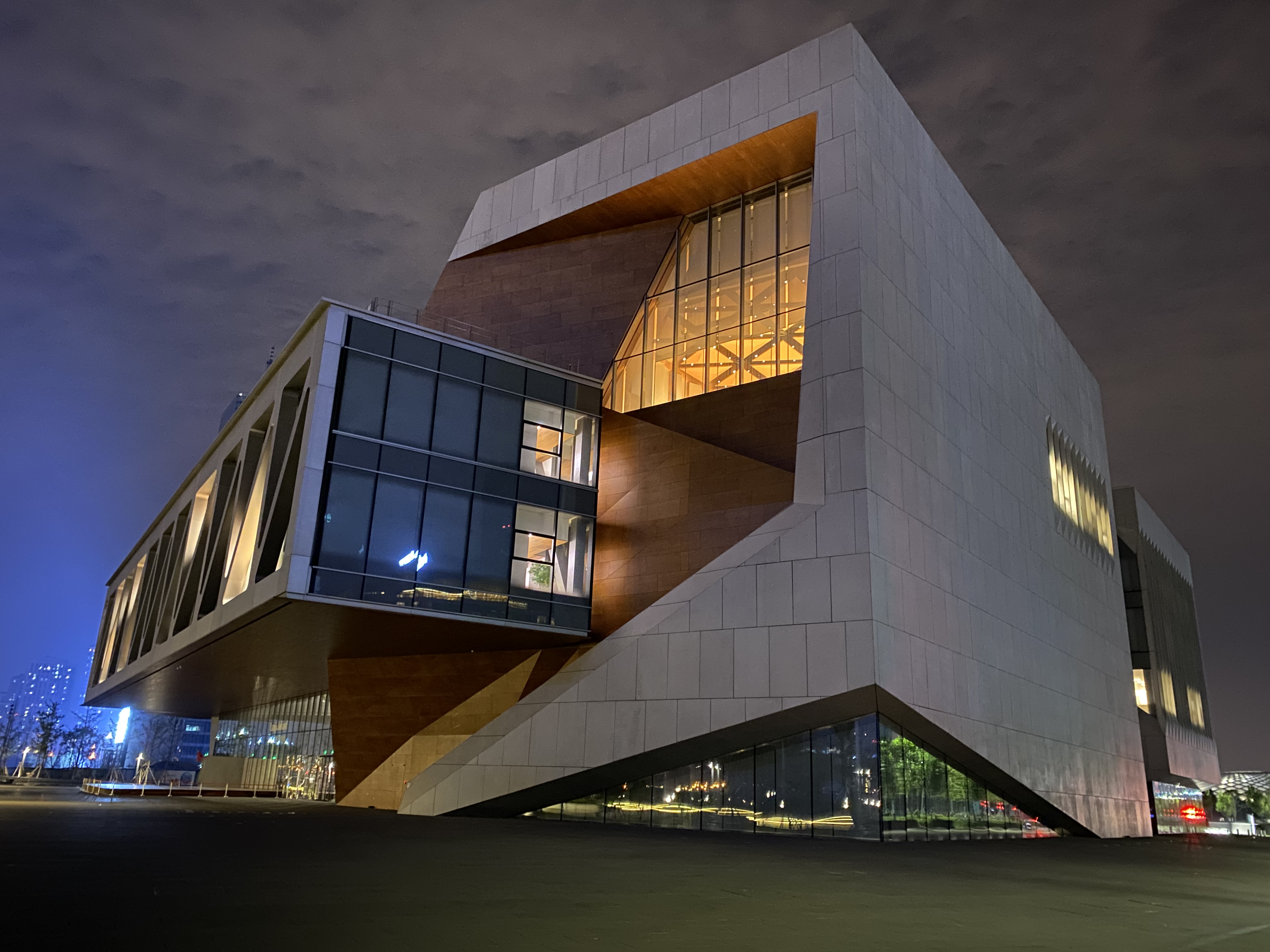
Tianjin Juilliard School in Tianjin Economic-Technological Development Area

Located in the Binhai New Area of Tianjin Municipality, TEDA is around 40 minutes from downtown Tianjin, 30 minutes from the Tianjin Binhai International Airport and 5 minutes away from the Tianjin Port. The Binhai Mass Transit rapid transit system was introduced in 2004 to reduce travel time between Tianjin downtown and TEDA.

There is an increasing expatriate population in TEDA, supported by the International School of Tianjin which is accredited by both WASC and CIS. The school Teda International School was established in 1995. Teda International School offers a curriculum based on United States standards. The school is authorized by the College Board to offer the Advanced Placement (AP) program, and examinations, and is an authorized SAT and TOEFL testing center.

TEDA is also home to the Tianjin TEDA Maple Leaf International School (TTMLIS), formerly called Harbor View School. TTMLIS is a member of Maple Leaf Education Systems, whose flagship school is located in the Dalian Development Area of the city of Dalian, Liaoning.

== Economy ==
According to Benchmarkia, the Tianjin Economic-Technological Development Area has the highest total investment among all industrial parks worldwide. Tingyi (Cayman Islands) Holding Corporation has its corporate headquarters in the TEDA.

== See also ==
- Binhai New Area
- Yujiapu Financial District
- Transport in Tianjin
- TEDA Holding
  - Tianjin Teda F.C.
  - Tianjin TEDA Co.
