= Death of Yao Yuanjun =

Martyr Yao Yuanjun
- 姚元军
- Official portrait of Yao Yuanjun
- Born: March 17, 1993; Lingtai County, Pingliang, Gansu, China
- Died: August 22, 2011 (aged 18) †; Shweli River, Ruili, Dehong Dai and Jingpo Autonomous Prefecture, Yunnan, China
- Cause of death: Drowning
- Burial place: Mangshi Martyr's Cemetery
- Education: Lingtai County Secondary Vocational School
- Military career
- Branch: People's Armed Police Border Defense Corps
- Service years: 2010-2011
- Rank: Private
- Units: Yunnan Border Defense Contingent, Dehong Detachment, Ruili Battalion, Jiangqiao Police Dog Re-training Base
- Conflicts: War on drugs; War on drugs in China †
- Awards: Martyr Status; Meritorious Service Medal 1st Class (posthumous)

Yao Yuanjun (Chinese: 姚元军; March 17, 1993 – August 22, 2011) was a border police officer (Note: Ministry of Public Security Active Service forces personnel, including the Border Defense Corps, were service members, however in this article MPSASF personnel will be referred to as "Police Officers" for simplicity) with the rank of Private who served in the People's Armed Police Border Defense Corps (part of the Ministry of Public Security Active Service Forces). Yao drowned in the Shweli river while attempting to arrest a drug trafficker on the China-Myanmar Border.

== Early life ==
Yao Yuanjun was born on March 17, 1993, in Beizhuang Village (北庄村) of Xitun township (made a town in 2015) Lingtai County, Pingliang in Gansu province. Both his parents had serious intellectual disabilities. As a result, he was mostly raised by his uncle and aunt. According to former neighbors, Yao would often help with renovating and building houses in the village.

He studied in Beizhuang village primary school and then went to Xitun town secondary school. According to his former teachers, he was considered an above-average student.

After graduating from middle school in March 2009, he went to Lingtai County Secondary Vocational School for 1 year where he studied electronics. In March 2010, after he graduated, he worked in Kunshan, Jiangsu as an intern for Wistron.

== Military career ==
He enlisted in the People's Armed Police Border Defense Corps on December 11, 2010 and was assigned to the Yunnan Contingent's Dehong Detachment. During his time at the Dehong Detachment's Training Battalion, he received 2 personal commendations. In March 2011, after finishing basic training, he was assigned to the Dehong Detachment's 1st Mobile Platoon. Due to excellent performance, he was reassigned to the Jiangqiao Police Dog Re-training Base (江桥警犬复训基地) of the Dehong Detachment's Ruili Battalion in July 2011 as a K9 trainer.

The China-Myanmar border is notorious for heroin smuggling due to its proximity to the golden triangle, and at 3:00 AM of August 6, 2011, after the Dehong Border Defense Detachment received a tip from civilians, Yao participated in the ambush of two drug dealers along G320 in a fugitive checkpoint, seizing 1.7 kg (3.7 lb) of heroin. On the same day, he arrested a highly wanted car thief during a routine check on a bus.

== Death ==
CCTV short video on Yao's death with reenactment 0:49-0:59
- https://www.guancha.cn/politics/2025_04_05_771041.shtml

At 1:40 AM of August 22, 2011 at a border checkpoint on a road between Ruili and Mangshi, a man on a motorbike was acting suspiciously. After border policemen found suspected drugs in a toilet paper roll, the man took off running. Yao Yuanjun and border policeman Jiang Shikui (江世葵) pursued the fleeing suspect. Yao managed to catch up to the suspect and attempted to arrest him, though the resisting suspect attempted to fight back, resulting in both Yao and the suspect falling into the Shweli river during their struggle. Jiang attempted to rescue Yao, however nearly drowned himself in the process, needing to be rescued by their platoon leader; Yao was subsequently declared missing in action. At the same time at the checkpoint, 19 grams (0.7 oz) of heroin were found on the suspect's jacket and motorcycle storage compartment.

The Border Defense Corps deployed over 10 speedboats to conduct search and rescue; many locals also volunteered with their own speedboats and rafts. His body was found on August 29 in Mangling village (芒令村) in Ruili, 4 kilometers away from the incident.

His funeral was held on August 30, 2011. On September 1, the Ministry of Public Security posthumously awarded him with martyr status and a 1st Class Meritorious Service Medal, and a memorial ceremony was held on September 3, with over 1000 people attending, including locals and former comrades. On September 5, a memorial portrait of Yao was hung up in his hometown of Xitun township's government in his memory.

Yao was buried at Mangshi Martyr's Cemetery (芒市烈士陵园), managed by the Mangshi Municipal Veteran's affairs Bureau.

After the disbandment of the Border Defense Corps in 2018, the Jiangqiao Police Dog Re-training base where Yao formerly worked is currently under the command of the National Immigration Administration.

== K9 Big Wolf ==
Big Wolf (大狼)
- "Big Wolf" in 2015 from the CCTV-7 video
- Other name: Dà láng (Pinyin)
- Species: Canis familiaris
- Breed: Kunming dog
- Nationality: China
- Occupation: Police dog
- Employer: People's Armed Police Border Defense Corps (Pre-2018); National Immigration Administration (Post-2018 (Presumably))
- Years active: Unknown, active at least between 2011 and 2021
- Owner: Multiple handlers from the Jiangqiao Police dog re-training base (Most notably Yao Yuanjun)
- Residence: Jiangqiao police dog re-training base

K9 "Big Wolf" (Chinese: 大狼; pinyin: Dà láng) was formerly Yao Yuanjun's police dog (Kunming dog breed); According to other officers in the same unit as Yao, he would feed and take care of "Big Wolf" every day, and would often bring him along to training exercises at a training area near the Shweli river.

Prior to Yao's death, "Big Wolf" was given the title of "Role Model Police Personnel" by the Jiangqiao Police Dog Re-training base; Additionally, Yao and "Big Wolf" were chosen as "Most compatible partners" of the police dog base.

According to reports, in the few days following Yao Yuanjun's death, the behavior of "Big Wolf" became abnormal.

In the following months after Yao's death, "Big Wolf" would be often seen wandering the training area near the Shweli river where Yao would take "Big Wolf" on walks and conduct training exercises, still waiting for Yao to return. According to Yao's former squad leader, Master Sgt 4th Class Dou Qing (豆庆), attempting to physically move "Big Wolf" gave no results as "Big Wolf" insisted on staying in the training area. As of 2021, "Big Wolf" has continued been seen wandering in the same area, still waiting for Yao after 10 years.

In 2021, a reposted CCTV-7 video on Weibo with the title ""Big Wolf" doesn't know why his owner suddenly is no longer coming" (“大狼”不知道为什么主人突然就不来了) went viral and even became one of the most searched topics on Weibo, gaining over 53.7 million views.

== Personal life ==
Yao was survived by his parents, uncle, aunt and elder sister.

== Service record ==
During his 8 months of service in the Border Defense Corps Dehong Detachment, Yao participated in handling 28 narcotics related cases, arresting 1 wanted criminal, arresting 14 suspects and seizing a total of 13.4 KG of drugs.

=== Awards and decorations ===
- Martyr Status (Posthumous)
- Meritorious Service Medal 1st Class (Posthumous)
- 2 personal commendations

== See also ==
- List of People's Armed Police personnel killed in the line of duty
- Hachikō
- Drug policy of China
- War on drugs

== Notes ==
1. Ministry of Public Security Active Service forces personnel, including the Border Defense Corps, were service members, however in this article MPSASF personnel will be referred to as "Police Officers" for simplicity
