= Langqing Quan =

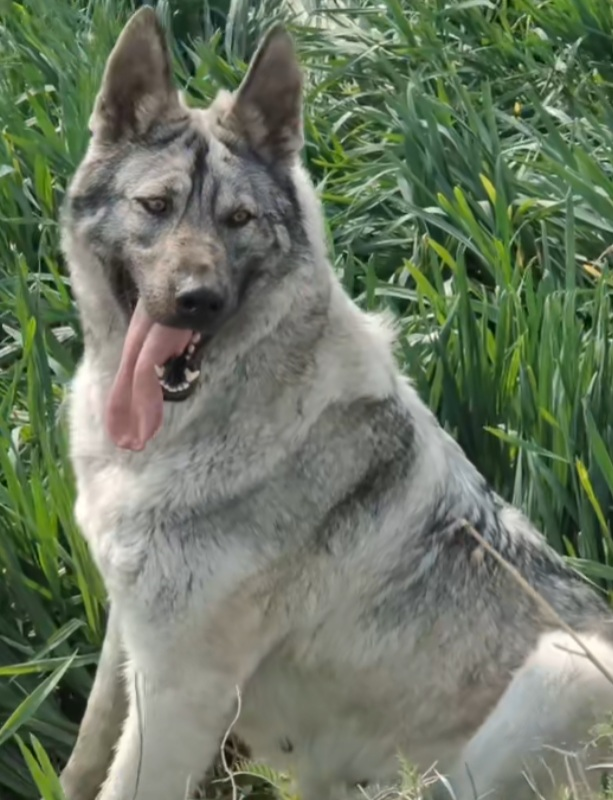
- Other names: Chinese Langqing Dog; Langqing Dog; Qinglang Dog; Qing Wolfdog; Gray Wolfdog; Wolf Grey Dog; Langqing; Luqing Quan; Wolfdog
- Origin: China
Traits
- Height: 28–33 in (70–85 cm)
- Weight: 55–132 lb (25–60 kg)
- Coat: Double coat
- Color: Iron green, Green white, Grass yellow, Blue gray, etc.

Langqing Quan (Chinese: 狼青犬；Pinyin: Láng qīng quǎn), also known as the Chinese Langqing Dog (中華狼青犬), Langqing Dog (狼青狗), Qinglang Dog (青狼犬), Qing Wolfdog (青狼狗), Gray Wolfdog (灰狼狗), Wolf Grey Dog (狼灰狗),referred to as Langqing (狼青), is a Chinese dog breed widely distributed in northern China, is a generalized dog type.

== Background ==
=== Distribution Area ===
Langqing Quan is a dog breed formed by cross-breeding between Tugou, a Wolfdog strain in northern China, and Chinese Wolves located in northern China. It is one of several dog breeds widely distributed in China.

=== Origin History ===
The Langqing Quan, like other older Chinese wolfdog breeds, has a complex origin, primarily resulting from the long-term interbreeding of several indigenous dog breeds with local Chinese wolves. Because of the interplay of generations of natural hybridization and human breeding, tracing its origins is difficult, and a complete understanding of its origins remains elusive.

=== Name ===
Langqing (狼青) refers to a type of canine coat color characterized by a grayish-blue or steel-blue tone, similar to that of a wolf. The term can also be used to describe various dog breeds that possess this coloration. The Langqing Quan received its name in 1950 for its distinctive coat, as it only exhibits Langqing colors.

=== Rumors ===
It is said that during the Japanese invasion of China in the 19th and 20th centuries, the Japanese army used this breed as a military dog. Because of this history, some people in China refer to Langqing Quan as "Riben Langqing Quan"(日本狼青犬) or "Riben Langqing"(日本狼青), literally meaning of "Japanese Langqing Dog".

The rumor that the Langqing Quan was a Japanese military dog likely stems from a historical development: Due to China's advanced dog breeding technology from the late 19th century to the early to mid-20th century, Japan imported dogs and technology from China. While there are no clear records indicating that Japan imported the Langqing Quan, there are records of Japan importing "German Shepherds" from kennels in Qingdao and Shanghai. However, based on the descriptions of these imported German Shepherds in Japanese records from the time, there's a high probability that some of these German Shepherds were mixed with Langqing Quan bloodlines, or were possibly the Langqing Quan.

These "German Shepherds" imported from China sparked a German Shepherd craze in Japan. Japan then began importing German Shepherds directly from Germany. However, due to their high cost, delicate constitution, and different gait, these German Shepherds imported directly from Germany did not completely replace the "German Shepherds" imported from China. The Japanese referred to these "German Shepherds" imported from China as "Qingdao strain's shepherd dogs"(青島系シェパード), also known as "Qingdao dogs"(青島犬) or "Qing dogs"(青犬), to distinguish them from the German Shepherds imported directly from Germany. According to Japanese records, these "Qingdao strain's shepherd dogs" were completely annihilated during the war with China a few years later.

It is now impossible to tell whether these German Shepherd dogs imported by Japan from Qingdao, China were mixed-breed German Shepherd dogs with Langqing Quan bloodline or purebred German Shepherd dogs. However, during the war, a few Chinese soldiers said that they saw the Japanese army suspected of using Langqing Quan as a military dog. This may be because they mistook German Shepherd dogs for Langqing Quan, or it may be that they saw Qingdao strain's shepherd dogs, and these Qingdao strain's shepherd dogs are very likely to have Langqing Quan bloodline or are Langqing Quan themselves. However, Chinese scholars refer to the Qingdao strain's shepherd dogs as "Heibei Langqing" (黑背狼青), meaning "wolf-colored German Shepherd", and consider them to be a different breed from the Langqing Quan.

== Appearance ==
Langqing Quan is a large dog with the physical characteristics of a typical wolf breed dog. Its eye color is yellowish brown or dark brown. Its coat colors include iron blue, green white, grass yellow, blue gray, etc.

The height of the Langqing Quan varies depending on the region. The average shoulder height for males is 75-85 cm, and for females is 70-75 cm. Langqing Quan in Hebei are larger, with the average male reaching 88 cm, and some individuals even reaching 90-95 cm. Therefore, Langqing Quan in Hebei are also known as "Giant Langqing Quan" (巨型狼青犬). Those who dislike Langqing Quan from Hebei call them "Luqing Quan" (驢青犬), meaning "Donkey-like Langqing Dog".

Some Langqing Quan found in the Wandering and in certain areas are smaller, with an average shoulder height of 66-71 cm for males and 61-66 cm for females, in some areas, the height of Langqing Quan ranges from 65cm-75cm for male dogs and 55cm-70cm for female dogs.

== Personality ==
The Langqing Quan is a fierce and agile dog with a heightened sense of smell and a high sensitivity. It is highly aggressive, alert, resilient, and possesses strong survival and adaptability. The Langqing Quan is very protective of its owner and will not approach strangers. The Langqing Quan is also easy to care for, not picky about food, and easy to tame.

== Use as a working dog ==
Langqing Quan is mainly suitable for working dogs responsible for supervision, care, guarding, robbery prevention, theft prevention, patrolling, hunting, fighting and other tasks. Commonly found in forest farms, enterprises, warehouses, villas, resorts, and fish ponds.

== Subspecies ==
Since the 19th century to beginning of the 20th century, the Chinese government, kennels, Langqing Quan enthusiasts in North China have bred new types of Langqing Quan by crossbreeding them with German Shepherds, Great Dane, Czechoslovakian Wolfdog and other dog breeds. These new types of Langqing Quan have some more obvious dog characteristics and some more obvious wolf characteristics, depending on the goals of the breeders of the new Langqing Quan. The Chinese use the terms "Old Langqing" (老版狼青) and "New Langqing" (新版狼青) to distinguish between purebred Langqing Quan and newly bred Langqing Quan subspecies.

=== Related dog breeds ===
==== Laizhou Hong ====
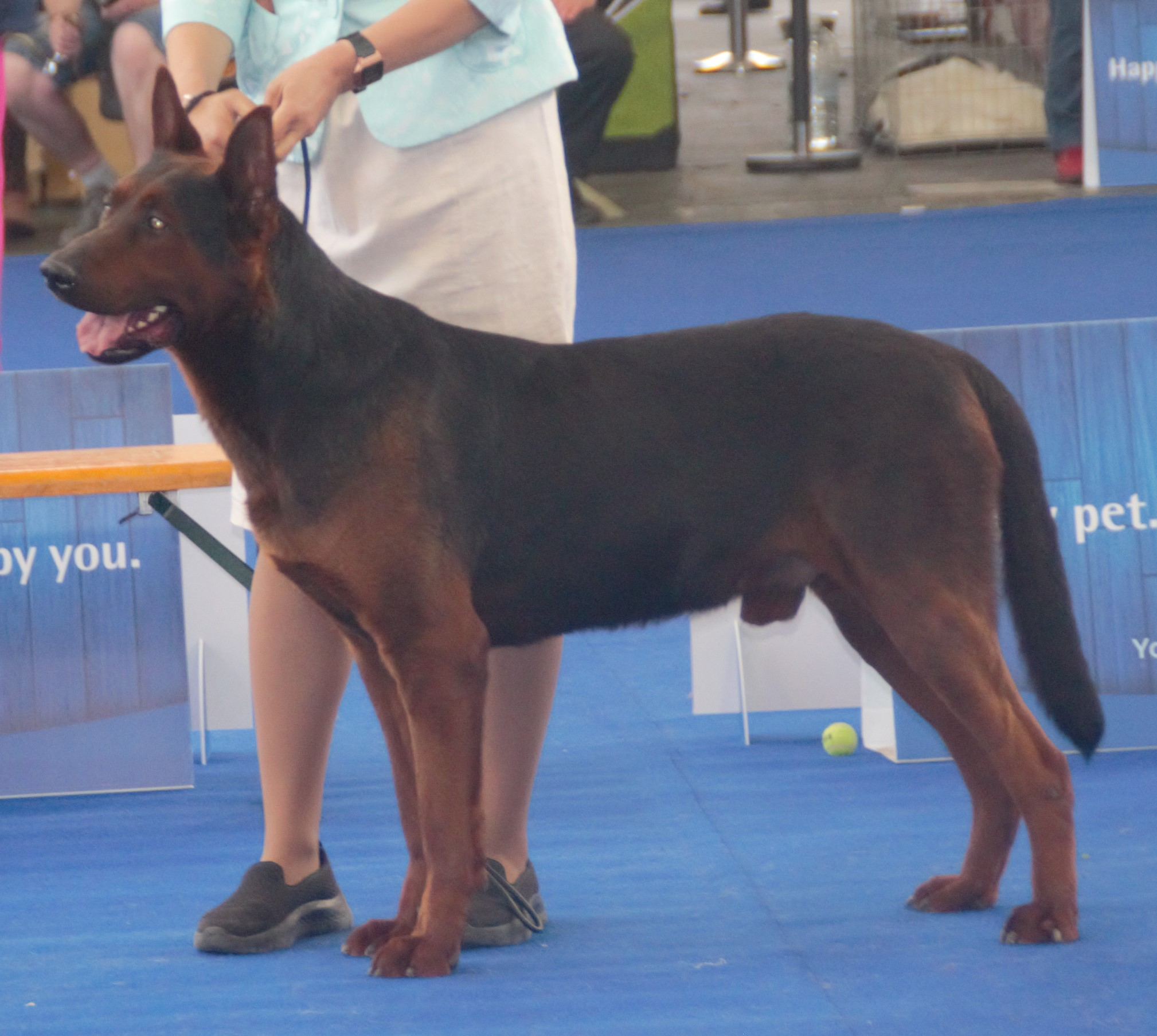
Laizhou Hong

In the 19th century, German workers came to China, bringing with them German Shepherds, Rottweilers, Great Danes, and other German breeds. Local Chinese dog breeders then used these German breeds as maternal parents to crossbreed with native Chinese dogs, such as Langqing Quan and Xigou, to create the "Laizhou Hong" breed.

==== Kunming dog ====
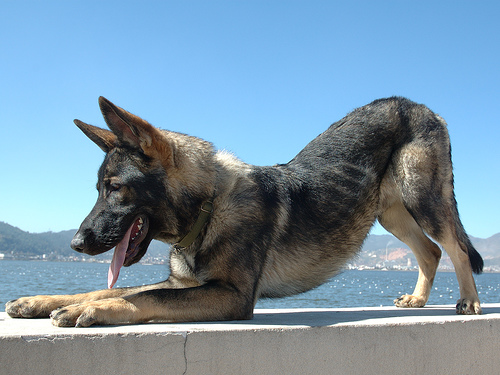
Kunming Dog

Police in Yunnan Province, China, selected several Langqing Quan and East European Shepherd in Kunming, and crossbred them with other local Chinese dog breeds to create the stable breed "Kunming dog".Langqing Quan's wolf-grey coat is a genetic contributor to the Wolf-grey coat, one of the three major coat color lines of the Kunming dog.

== See also ==
- Kunming dog
- Kunma Dog
- Laizhou Hong
- Wolfdog
