= Illegal drug trade in China =

The Illegal drug trade in China is largely focused on the golden triangle area near the China-Myanmar border.

== Opium ==
Opium has played an important role in China's history since the First and Second Opium Wars in the mid-19th century. The fall of the Qing dynasty in 1911 led to a resurgence in domestic opium production. The Nationalist government, provincial governments, the revolutionary base areas of the Chinese Communist Party (CCP), and the British colonial government of Hong Kong all depended on opium taxes as a major source of revenue.

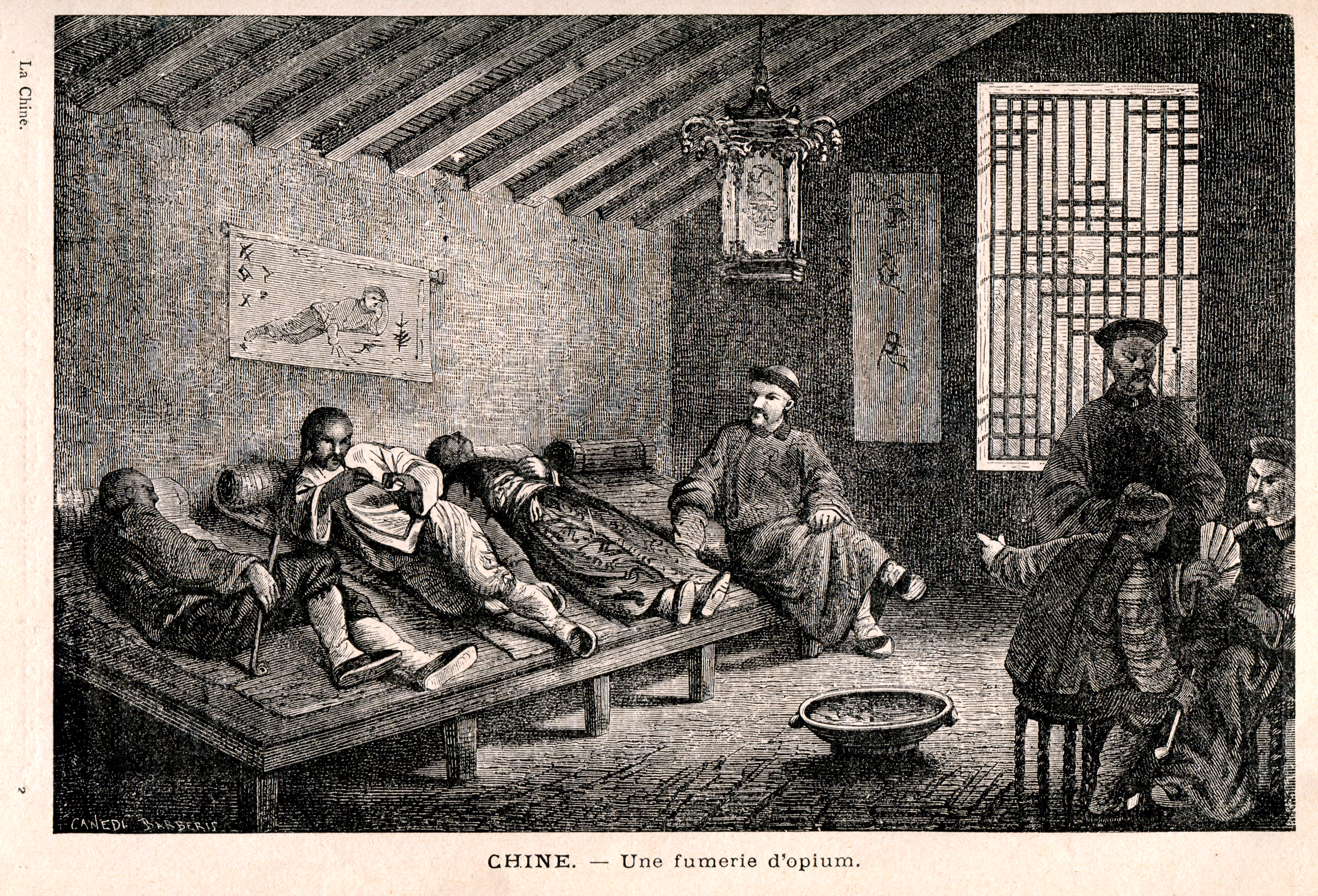
China opium den, c. 1896

The Mao Zedong government is generally credited with eradicating both consumption and production of opium during the 1950s using unrestrained repression and social reform. Ten million addicts were forced into compulsory treatment, dealers were executed, and opium-producing regions were planted with new crops. Remaining opium production shifted south of the Chinese border into the Golden Triangle region. The remnant opium trade primarily served Southeast Asia, but spread to American soldiers during the Vietnam War, with 20 percent of soldiers regarding themselves as addicted during the peak of the epidemic in 1971.

== Synthetic drugs ==
Manufacture of crystal methamphetamine (ice, shabu, bingdu) is facilitated by the availability of precursor chemicals, such as pseudoephedrine and ephedrine. Seizure information indicates that methamphetamine laboratories are located in SAR Hong Kong and the Golden Triangle in Myanmar (Burma). Many of the traffickers for the clandestine crystal methamphetamine laboratories are from organized crime groups based in Hong Kong, Taiwan, and Japan.

The United Nations Office on Drugs and Crime has documented the displacement of synthetic drug production from China to the Southeast Asia region. In a 2019 assessment of regional transnational organized crime, it described a “profound transformation” occurring, with manufacture of synthetic drugs on a steep incline in Myanmar, with drug syndicates displaced from China by heavy law enforcement suppression efforts. The same report noted that transnational organized crime groups operating in Myanmar work with militias and ethnic armed organizations to both manufacture and trafficking crystalline and tablet methamphetamine.

While production has largely migrated out of China, precursor chemicals have still been traced and seized entering Myanmar and Laos from China, which has an extensive domestic chemical industry. Laos is a key route into the Golden Triangle for precursors from China, and finished products from the region have been seized across the region and beyond. Numerous seizures of precursors from China have occurred in recent years, including one disclosed in 2021 in which Lao authorities seized 200 tons of precursors including 72 tons of propionyl chloride from China. Seizures in the Mekong region have been sustained in recent years, totaling over 169 tons and a record of over 1.1 billion methamphetamine tablets in 2023, more than any other part of the world, with Myanmar representing one of the world's largest sources of the drug.

The Golden Triangle Special Economic Zone (GTSEZ) is a key transit point for the trade. The GTSEZ was founded and is chaired by sanctioned Chinese national Zhao Wei. The United Nations Office on Drugs and Crime (UNODC) has raised concerns on multiple occasions times about Laos being used as a base by organized crime to traffic drugs, precursor chemicals and other illicit commodities, noting that unregulated border casinos in the Mekong region including Kings Romans in the GTSEZ are being used to launder money.

== Trafficking ==
Drug-related arrests in China, 1991–2003 Sources: Chinese Government Information, 1991–2002, and the International Narcotics Control Strategy Report (INCSR), U.S. Department of State, 2002, and INCSR January 2003-June 2003.
Year	Arrests	Convictions
1991	8,080	5,285
1992	7,025	6,588
1993	7,677	6,137
1994	10,434	7,883
1995	12,990	9,801
1996	18,860	13,787
1997	24,873	18,878
1998	34,287	27,229
1999	37,627	33,641
2000	39,604	33,203
2001	40,602	33,895
2002	42,854	32,222
2003	31,400	25,879

=== Trafficking groups ===
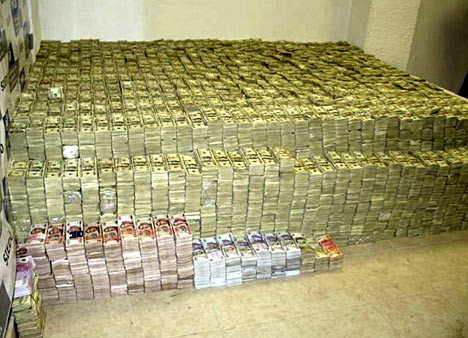
Part of the US$207 million seized from alleged drug trafficker Zhenli Ye Gon

Many of the individuals involved in the international trafficking of Southeast Asian heroin are ethnic Kokang, Yunnanese, Fujianese, Cantonese, or members of other ethnic Chinese minority groups that reside outside of China. These groups reside, and are actively involved in drug trafficking in regions such as Myanmar, Cambodia, Canada, Hong Kong, Taiwan, Thailand, and the United States.

These criminal organizations involved in drug trafficking are increasingly arming themselves with automatic weapons and grenades to protect their drug shipments from theft by rival organizations. In China, sentencing for drug trafficking can include capital punishment. For example, the seizure of 50 grams or more of heroin or crystal methamphetamine could result in the use of the death penalty by the Government.

Hui Muslim drug dealers are accused by Uyghur Muslims of pushing heroin on Uyghurs. Heroin has been vended by Hui dealers. There is a typecast image in the public eye of heroin being the province of Hui dealers. Hui have been involved in the Golden Triangle drug area.

=== Drug seizures ===
Prior to 2018, the People's Armed Police Border Defense Corps of the Ministry of Public Security Active Service Forces was involved in many anti-drug operations on the China-Myanmar border, where much of the illegal Chinese drug trade is located. In March 25, 2007, 3 PAPBDC officers were killed in action during a shootout with drug traffickers on the China-Myanmar border.

Between 2013 and 2023, the China Coast Guard seized a total of 9.875 tonnes of drugs.

Drug seizures in China (in metric tons) 1995–2003 Source: Chinese Government, 1995–2001; DEA Beijing, 2002 and INCSR (China), January 2003-June 2003.
	1995	1996	1997	1998	1999	2000	2001	2002	2003
Heroin	2,376	4,347	5,478	7,358	5,364	6,281	13.2	9.29	4.07
Opium	1.11	1,745	1,880	1,215	1,193	2,428	2.82	1.2	N/A
Precursor chemicals	86	219	383	344	272	215	208	300	N/A
Marijuana	0,466	4,876	2,408	5,079	0,106	4,493	0,751	1.3	N/A
Crystal methamphetamine	1,304	1,599	1,334	1,608	16,059	20.9	4.82	3.19	4.53

=== Heroin ===
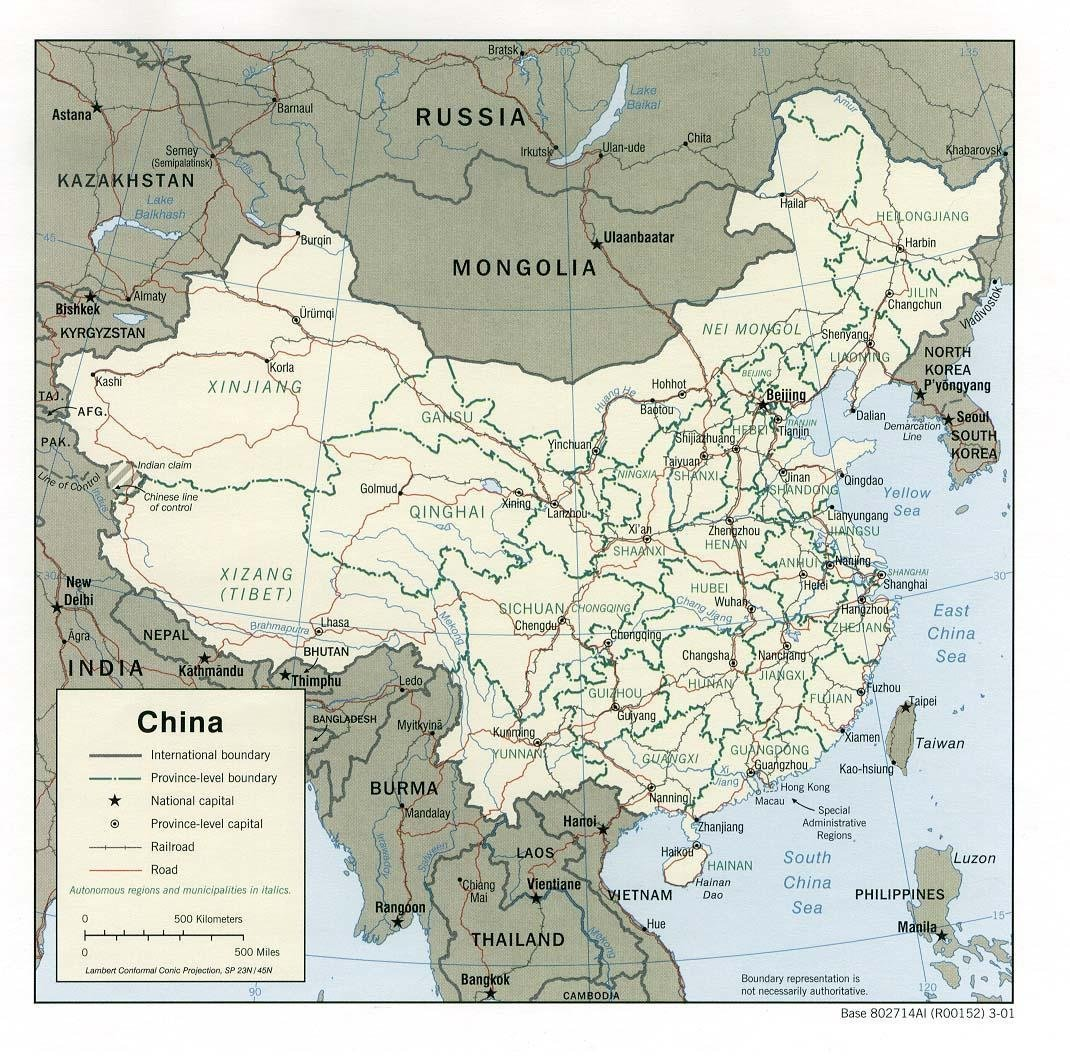
China's borders (click to enlarge)

China shares a 2000 km border with Myanmar, as well as smaller but significant borders with Laos and Vietnam. Chinese officials state that the majority of heroin entering China comes over the border from Myanmar. This heroin then transits southern China, through SAR Hong Kong, and then on to international markets. Increased Chinese interdiction efforts along the Myanmar–China border have forced traffickers to use routes in Thailand, Laos, Myanmar (Burma), Cambodia, and SAR Hong Kong.

=== Synthetic drugs ===
Due to the availability of the precursor chemicals, traffickers produce large amounts of crystal methamphetamine. Several ports in Hong Kong SAR serve as transit points for crystal methamphetamine transported by containerized cargo to international drug markets.

For decades, Asian crime syndicates in partnership with ethnic minority militias have used the Golden Triangle - centred on northern Myanmar and including parts of Laos and Thailand - to grow opium and refine heroin.

More recently, meth production by groups such as the Sam Gor syndicate has exploded in the region, in part due to a crackdown in neighbouring China.

Another case involved Liu Zhaohua, who produced up to 31 tonnes of methamphetamine and made more than US$5.5 billion from it. In 2006, during the term of Hu Jintao, Liu was sentenced to death for drug trafficking, and in 2009 Liu was executed.

=== Fentanyl ===
In August 2022, China suspended counter-narcotics cooperation with the United States in retaliation for then-House Speaker Nancy Pelosi's visit to Taiwan. The cooperation was restored in late 2023 following a diplomatic summit between General Secretary of the Chinese Communist Party Xi Jinping and U.S. President Joe Biden.

According to the U.S. Drug Enforcement Agency in 2023, China continued to be the primary source of fentanyl being imported into the United States, killing over 100 Americans every day. Over a two-year period, close to $800 million worth of fentanyl pills were illegally sold online to the US by Chinese distributors. The drug is usually manufactured in China, then shipped to Mexico, where it is processed and packaged, which is then smuggled into the US by Mexican drug cartels.

In October 2023, OFAC sanctioned a China-based network of fentanyl manufacturers and distributors. U.S. President Donald Trump blamed China for the opioid crisis in the United States. He said the tariffs are intended to pressure China to do more to stop the flow of fentanyl into the US.

In 2025, the Trump administration sharply criticized China for allegedly sustaining the flow of fentanyl into the United States, with President Trump accusing Beijing of "poisoning our citizens" through the export of precursor chemicals used in the drug's production. While U.S. officials acknowledged a drop in fentanyl purity, suggesting difficulties in accessing key ingredients, China rejected the accusations, framing the opioid crisis as primarily a U.S. domestic issue driven by demand. Chinese authorities emphasized their regulatory actions and cooperation but expressed frustration over the lack of recognition from Washington. Commenting on China's role, RAND Corporation researcher David Luckey argued that, as a command economy, China has the capacity to exert far greater control over its chemical industry, stating that if the Chinese Communist Party truly wished to prevent companies from supplying precursors to criminal networks, it could do so more effectively.

== Drug-related money laundering ==
"Unlike other MLOs, which transfer proceeds into and out of the country, a significant amount of the money laundered by CMLOs stays in the United States. Traditionally, CMLOs purchase criminal proceeds in U.S. cities for a nominal fee, transfer the equivalent value of foreign currency to drug traffickers’ foreign bank accounts and then “sell” the drug proceeds at a substantially higher rate to Chinese nationals seeking to avoid China's currency controls. These organizations also exploit China's “one country, two systems” policy by using the more liberal banking system in Hong Kong to establish USD bank accounts to facilitate their schemes."

== Drug abuse and treatment ==
=== Drugs of choice ===
Wholesale drug prices in China (U.S. dollars), January 2003 Source: DEA Beijing
Drug	Location	Price
Southeast Asian heroin (price per 1 unit = 700 grams)	Guangzhou	18,000
Southeast Asian heroin (price per 1 unit = 700 grams)	Fuzhou	18,000
Southeast Asian heroin (price per 1 unit = 700 grams)	Burmese border	5,000
Crystal methamphetamine (price per kilogram)	Guangzhou	3,700
Crystal methamphetamine (price per kilogram)	Xiamen	4,000
MDMA (price per tablet)	Beijing	27–36
MDMA (price per tablet)	Shanghai	27–36
MDMA (price per tablet)	Guangzhou	9
MDMA (price per tablet)	Fuzhou	9

The major drugs of choice are injectable heroin, morphine, smokeable opium, crystal methamphetamine, nimetazepam, temazepam, and MDMA. Preferences between opium and heroin/morphine, and methods of administration, differ from region to region within China. The use of heroin and opium has increased among the younger population, as income has grown and the youth have more free time. China considers crystal methamphetamine abuse second to heroin/morphine as a major drug problem. The use of MDMA has only recently become popular in China's growing urban areas.

The South China Morning Post reports the rise in the use of ketamine, easy to mass-produce in illicit labs in southern China, particularly among the young. Because of its low cost, and low profit margin, drug peddlers rely on mass distribution to make money, thus increasing its penetrative power to all, including schoolchildren. The journal cites social workers saying that four people can get high by sharing just HK$20 worth of ketamine, and estimates 80 per cent of young drug addicts take 'K'.

=== Addict population ===
As of 2013, there were 2,475,000 registered drug addicts in China, 1,326,000 of whom were addicted to heroin, accounting for 53.6% of the addict population. Some unofficial estimates range as high as 12 million drug addicts.

In 2001, intravenous heroin users accounted for 70.9 percent of the confirmed 22,000 human immunodeficiency virus (HIV) and acquired immune deficiency syndrome (AIDS) cases. Chinese officials are becoming increasingly concerned about the abuse of methamphetamine and other amphetamine-type stimulants.

=== Treatment and demand reduction programs ===
Both voluntary and compulsory drug treatment programs are provided in China, although the compulsory treatment is more common. Most addicts who attend these centers do so involuntarily upon orders from the Government. Voluntary treatment is provided at centers operated by Public Health Bureaus, but these programs are more expensive and many people cannot afford to attend them. Addicts who return to drug use after having received treatment, and cannot be cured by other means, may be sentenced to rehabilitation in labor camps for re-education through labor. These centers are run under conditions similar to prisons, including isolation from the outside world, restricted patient movement and a paramilitary routine.

Demand reduction efforts target individuals between the ages of 17 and 35, since this is the largest segment of drug users. These efforts include, but are not limited to, media campaigns and establishment of drug-free communities.

== Drug law enforcement agencies and legislation ==
At the national level, the agencies specifically responsible for the control of legal and illicit drugs are the Ministry of Health, the Ministry of Public Security, and the Customs General Administration. The State Food and Drug Administration oversees implementation of the laws regulating the pharmaceutical industry. In the Customs General Administration, the Smuggling Prevention Department plays the major role in intercepting illegal drug shipments. The Narcotics Control Bureau of the Ministry of Public Security handles all criminal investigations involving opium, heroin, and methamphetamine.

In 1990, the Chinese government set up the National Narcotics Control Commission (NNCC), composed of 25 departments, including the Ministry of Public Security, Ministry of Health and General Administration of Customs. The NNCC leads the nation's drug control work in a unified way, and is responsible for international drug control cooperation, with an operational agency based in the Ministry of Public Security.

Between 2013 and 2023, the China Coast Guard seized a total of 9.875 tonnes of drugs.

== Treaties and conventions ==
China is a party to the 1988 U.N. Drug Convention, the 1961 U.N. Single Convention on Narcotic Drugs as amended by the 1972 Protocol, and the 1971 U.N. Convention on Psychotropic Substances. China is a member of the International Criminal Police Organization (INTERPOL), and has been a member of the INCB since 1984.

China also participates in a drug control program with Iran, Pakistan, Tajikistan, Turkmenistan, Uzbekistan, Russia, and the United States. This program is designed to enhance information sharing and coordination of drug law enforcement activities by countries in and around the Central Asian Region.

In June 2000, China and the United States signed a Mutual Legal Assistance Agreement (MLAT). This treaty subsequently went into effect on March 8, 2001. In 1999, China and the United States signed a Bilateral Customs Mutual Assistance Agreement. However, this agreement has not yet been activated. A May 1997 United States and China Memorandum of Understanding on law enforcement cooperation allows the two countries to provide assistance on drug investigations and prosecutions on a case-by-case basis.

China has over 30 MLATs with 24 nations covering both civil and criminal matters. In 1996, China signed MLATs that gave specific attention to drug trafficking with Russia, Mexico, and Pakistan. China also signed a drug control cooperation agreement with India.

China and Myanmar continue dialogue on counter-drug issues, such as drug trafficking by the United Wa State Army along the China–Myanmar border. The Government of China encourages and provides assistance for alternative crop programs in Myanmar along the China–Myanmar border. China is also building on Memoranda of Understanding that are currently in place with Myanmar, Cambodia, Laos, Thailand, Vietnam, and the United Nations Office on Drugs and Crime.

== See also ==
- Crime in the People's Republic of China
- Drug policy of China
- Shanghai Drug Abuse Treatment Centre
- Wilful Blindness (2021 book)
- Opium Wars

Other countries

- U.S. War on drugs
- Fentanyl
- Illicit drug use in Australia
- Mexican drug war
- Illegal drug trade in Colombia
- Legality of cannabis by country
