= Cannabis in China =

- Location of China (dark green)
- Medicinal: Illegal
- Recreational: Illegal
- Hemp: Legal

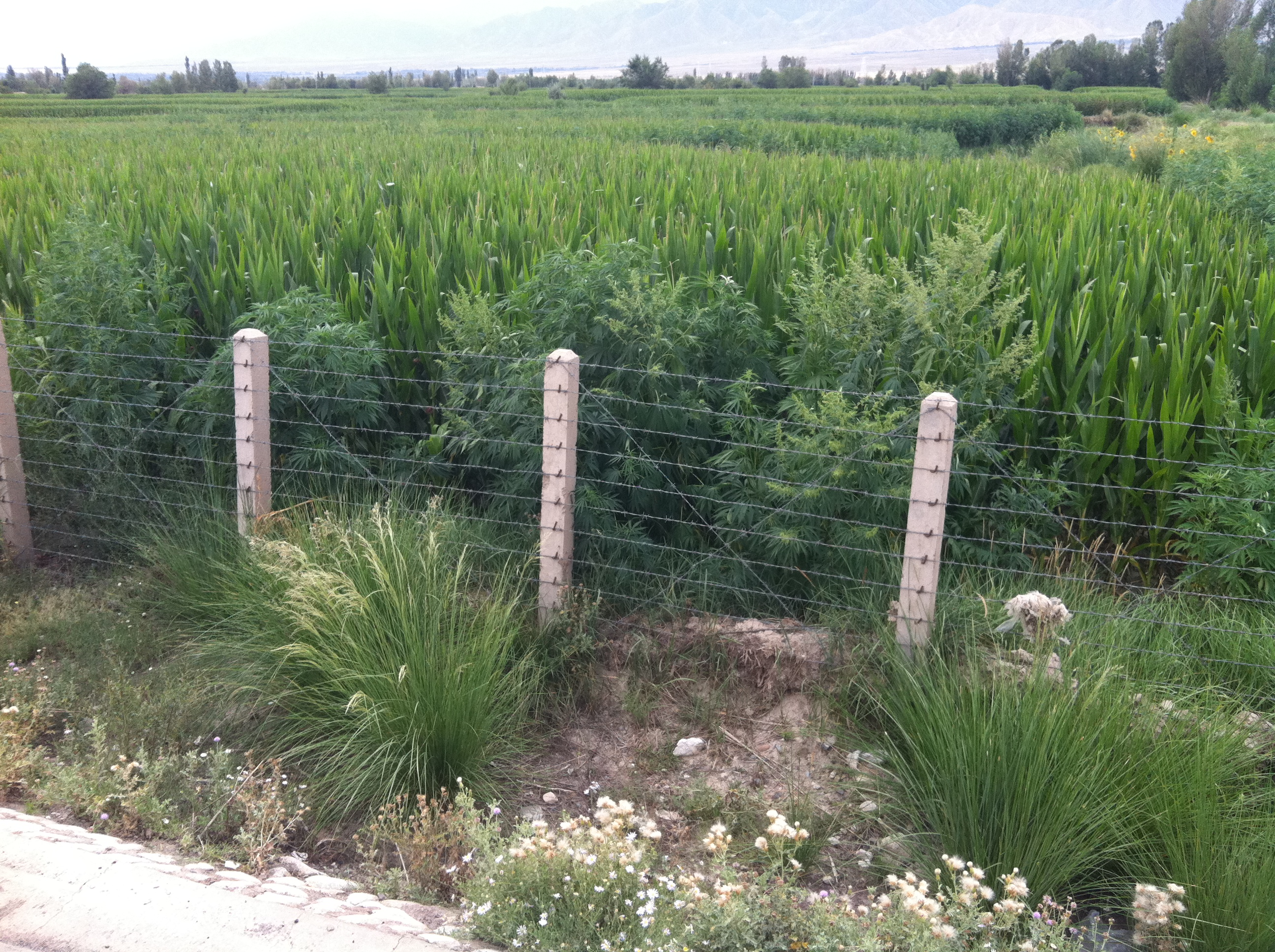
Cannabis by the roadside, Jiuquan, Gansu

Cannabis is illegal in the People's Republic of China (PRC) except for industrial purposes (hemp) and some forms of medicine. Historically, cannabis has been used in mainland China for fiber, seeds, as a traditional medicine, as well as for some ritual purposes within Taoism.

== Chinese etymology ==
Má (Mandarin pronunciation: [mǎ]), a Chinese word for cannabis, is represented by the Han character 麻. The term ma, used to describe medical marijuana by 2700 BCE, is the oldest recorded name for the hemp plant.

The word ma has been used to describe the cannabis plant since before the invention of writing five-thousand years ago. Ma might share a common root with the Proto-Semitic word mrr, meaning "bitter." Evidence of the earliest human cultivation of cannabis was found in Taiwan. Ancient Chinese prose and poems, including poetry in the Shi jing (Book of Odes), mention the word ma many times. An early song refers to young women weaving ma into clothing.

The word ma is often paired with the Chinese word for "big" or "great" to form the compound word dama or 大麻 (dàmá). Dama is sometimes used to describe industrial hemp, as there is a negative connotation meaning "numbness" associated with the word ma by itself. Historical Chinese medical texts (c. 200 CE) through contemporary twentieth century Chinese medical literature discuss individual terms for ma, including mafen (麻蕡), mahua (麻花), and mabo (麻勃), referring to specific parts of the male and female flowers of a cannabis plant with differing cannabinoid ratios.

== History ==
Cannabis has been confirmed to have originated in Northwest China before the Ancient Chinese domesticated the plant to India and other parts of Asia, particularly the Central Asian steppe in 10,000 BC. In the 19th century, Xinjiang province was a major producer and exporter of hashish, with Yarkand being a major center. Tens of thousands of kilograms annually were exported to British India, legally and under tariff, until 1934 when Chinese authorities cut off the legal trade, though smuggling continued for some years after.

According to the Ministry of Public Security in 2015, cannabis use was on the rise among Chinese youth.

== Legal status ==
In 1985, the People's Republic of China joined the Convention on Psychotropic Substances and identified marijuana as a dangerous narcotic drug, and made it illegal to possess or use it. The penalty for marijuana possession in China is disputed from various sources, but according to the Law on Public Security Administration Punishments, marijuana smokers shall be detained for 10 to 15 days and fined a maximum of 2,000 yuan. However, the cultivation of cannabis for industrial purposes (hemp) has never been prohibited in China.

On the other hand, cannabis seeds have been continuously listed in the Chinese Pharmacopeia.

== Cultivation ==
Cannabis plants are widely grown in Yunnan Province, especially around the city of Dali. However, the Yunnan government began an eradication campaign in 1998 to make the province "cannabis free" by 2000, resulting in less wild and commercially grown cannabis. A similar campaign has also caused a rise in marijuana prices in Xinjiang.

== Taoism ==
Beginning around the 4th century, Taoist texts mentioned using cannabis in censers. Needham cited the (ca. 570 AD) Taoist encyclopedia Wushang Biyao 無上秘要 ("Supreme Secret Essentials") that cannabis was added into ritual incense-burners, and suggested the ancient Taoists experimented systematically with "hallucinogenic smokes". The Yuanshi shangzhen zhongxian ji 元始上真眾仙記 ("Records of the Assemblies of the Perfected Immortals"), which is attributed to Ge Hong (283–343), says:

For those who begin practicing the Tao it is not necessary to go into the mountains. … Some with purifying incense and sprinkling and sweeping are also able to call down the Perfected Immortals. The followers of the Lady Wei and of Hsu are of this kind.

Lady Wei Huacun 魏華存 (252–334) and Xu Mi 許謐 (303–376) founded the Taoist Shangqing School. The Shangqing scriptures were supposedly dictated to Yang Xi (330-c. 386) in nightly revelations from immortals, and Needham proposed Yang was "aided almost certainly by cannabis". The Mingyi bielu 名醫別錄 ("Supplementary Records of Famous Physicians"), written by the Taoist pharmacologist Tao Hongjing (456–536), who also wrote the first commentaries to the Shangqing canon, says, "Hemp-seeds (麻勃) are very little used in medicine, but the magician-technicians (shujia 術家) say that if one consumes them with ginseng it will give one preternatural knowledge of events in the future." A 6th-century AD Taoist medical work, the Wuzangjing 五臟經 ("Five Viscera Classic") says, "If you wish to command demonic apparitions to present themselves you should constantly eat the inflorescences of the hemp plant."

Joseph Needham connected myths about Magu, "the Hemp Damsel", with early Daoist religious usages of cannabis, pointing out that Magu was goddess of Shandong's sacred Mount Tai, where cannabis "was supposed to be gathered on the seventh day of the seventh month, a day of séance banquets in the Taoist communities."

== See also ==
- Drug policy of China
- History of medical cannabis
- Cannabis in Hong Kong
- Cannabis in Macau

== Sources ==
- Abel, Ernest L. (1980). "Cannabis in the Ancient World". Marihuana: the first twelve thousand years. New York City: Plenum Publishers. ISBN 978-0-306-40496-2.
- Bretschneider, Emil (1895). Botanicon Sinicum: Notes on Chinese Botany from Native and Western Sources. Part III, Botanical Investigations in the Materia Medica of the Ancient Chinese. Kelly & Walsh.
- Clarke, Robert; Merlin, Mark (1 September 2013). "History of use of Cannabis use for fiber". Cannabis: Evolution and Ethnobotany. University of California Press. pp. 135–198. ISBN 978-0-520-95457-1. OCLC 927967115.
- Hanson, Glen R.; Venturelli, Peter J.; Fleckenstein, Annette E. (2014). "Marijuana". Drugs and Society. Jones & Bartlett Publishers. ISBN 978-1-284-05478-1.
- Shurtleff, William; Huang, H.T.; Aoyagi, Akiko (June 22, 2014). History of Soybeans and Soyfoods in China and Taiwan, and in Chinese Cookbooks, Restaurants, and Chinese Work with Soyfoods Outside China (1024 BCE to 2014). Soyinfo Center. ISBN 978-1-928-91468-6.
