= Drug policy of China =

The People's Republic of China enforces a strict anti-drug policy, employing nationwide publicity and education to foster pharmacophobia and awareness of drug-related harm. Policy priorities include reducing the proportion of new drug addictions, enhancing public security bureau efforts against drug-related crimes, and establishing comprehensive societal prevention mechanisms. Although rehabilitation is a stated goal, relapse rates remain high at 80-95%.

China's uncompromising anti-drug stance is heavily influenced by the Opium War. Critics argue that these policies prevent medical research into the therapeutic uses of drugs, with some drugs accepted as medically necessary in other countries (e.g., MDMA, amphetamine) being entirely banned and excluded from research in China.

== Policies ==
=== Eliminating drugs at their source ===
The Chinese government has made banning the cultivation of drug plants a priority. The National Narcotics Control Commission (Chinese: 国家麻醉品管制委员会) implements nationwide efforts to eradicate drugs every year. Local governments in certain mountainous and forested areas also organize personnel to investigate and monitor this. In 2008, a total of 62,000 drug-related crime cases were solved, 74,000 suspects were arrested, and 4.4 tonnes of heroin, 6.2 tonnes of methamphetamine, 1.078 million ecstasy pills, 5.3 tonnes of ketamine, 2.2 tonnes of marijuana, 1.4 tonnes of opium, and 0.8 tonnes of cocaine were seized. 3.779 million poppy plants and 308,000 marijuana plants were also eradicated.

=== Prevention of the entry of foreign drugs ===
The General Administration of Customs cooperates with overseas law enforcement agencies to prevent foreign drugs from entering the country. Since 2022, they have opened and investigated 1,037 drug smuggling cases and seized 5.3 tonnes of drugs such as cocaine and methamphetamine.

Between 2013 and 2023, the China Coast Guard confiscated a total of 9.875 tonnes of drugs.

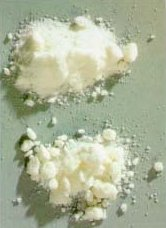
Cocaine

China actively supports and promotes sub-regional anti-drug cooperation activities initiated by the United Nations. They also continue to strengthen bilateral and multilateral international anti-drug cooperation with foreign countries. Over the years, China has carried out several anti-drug intelligence exchanges, training, and law enforcement cooperation with the United States, Canada, Japan, France, Australia, Thailand, Myanmar, Laos, Vietnam, Cambodia, and other countries. Since 1996, China has also successively established a liaison officer system for anti-drug law enforcement cooperation in border areas with Myanmar, Laos, Vietnam and Russia.

Chinese Customs has arrested drug smuggling cases over the years
	2018	2019	2020	2022-2023.5
Number of cases caught(pieces)	596	735	610	1037
Total weight of drugs seized (tons)	4.61	2.77	1.6	5.3

== Education ==
Anti-drug publicity and education have been described as the fundamental solution to the anti-drug work. China actively engages several social sectors, including education, civil affairs, industry, commerce, trade unions, the Communist Youth League, and the Women's Federation, in its anti-drug initiatives. Together, they have conducted a range of activities, such as knowledge competitions, lectures, photo exhibitions, and public campaigns to raise awareness about drug abuse

Chinese state propaganda encourages schools to make "anti-drug education" an important part of students' moral education in teaching courses. Some local schools have incorporated anti-drug education into their legal education curricula, allocating class hours each semester and integrating knowledge from chemistry, biology, and other subjects. They also use modern information technologies to teach, enabling students to better understand the dangers of drugs, as well as how to identify and refuse drugs. Students who use drugs face discrimination and may be barred from entering schools.

Critics have argued that China's anti-drug education policies favour ideology over evidence-based strategies. The use of fear-based approaches can erode trust if participants encounter evidence that contradicts these exaggerated claims, leading them to dismiss all information provided to them. The use of the "gateway drug" theory, that using "soft" drugs like cannabis inevitably leads to harder drugs like heroin or cocaine, has been widely criticised as overly simplistic and unsupported by evidence. By portraying drug users negatively, anti-drug programs may perpetuate stigma, making it harder for people to seek help for addiction or related issues. Anti-drug education also often takes a moralistic approach, implying that drug use is inherently immoral rather than addressing social, psychological, or medical factors that contribute to drug use. Many programs present drugs in binary terms, labeling them as universally bad and failing to address the complexity of drug use, including the potential medical benefits of some substances.

== Macro perspectives ==
The effective management of drug-related crimes is related to national security. For a long time, China has adopted an anti-drug criminal policy of severe penalties. In the context of the high cost and heavy burden of anti-drug justice, the current criminal policy has failed to fully maximize drug crime governance. Although the number of drug crime cases has been declining in recent years, the total number is still large.

=== Economic perspective ===
According to Article 347 of the Criminal Law of the People's Republic of China, smuggling, selling, transporting, and manufacturing drugs, regardless of the quantity, is investigated for criminal responsibility and punished accordingly. As such, minor drug cases consume a lot of judicial resources of the anti-drug judicial organs.

=== Social and humanistic perspective ===
In China, drug addicts are often positioned as "bad guys" and "lawbreakers" and are ostracized by the entire society and punished by the law. After the promulgation of the Anti-Drug Law, drug addicts were given the triple role status of "offender", "patient", and "victim".

Police officers at drug rehabilitation centers have developed comprehensive drug rehabilitation education content for drug addicts, including classroom teaching, physical rehabilitation training, psychological crisis intervention, vocational and technical training, auxiliary education activities, etc. It allows drug addicts to overcome addiction, rebuild their confidence in a positive and healthy life, and learn vocational skills to lay a solid foundation for returning to society.

=== Legal perspective ===
China is incredibly tough on drug manufacturers and traffickers. Anyone found with more than a kilogram of opium or 50 grams of heroin is sentenced to death.

== See also ==
- Cannabis in China
- Illegal drug trade in China
- Shanghai Drug Abuse Treatment Centre
