= Laizhou Hong =

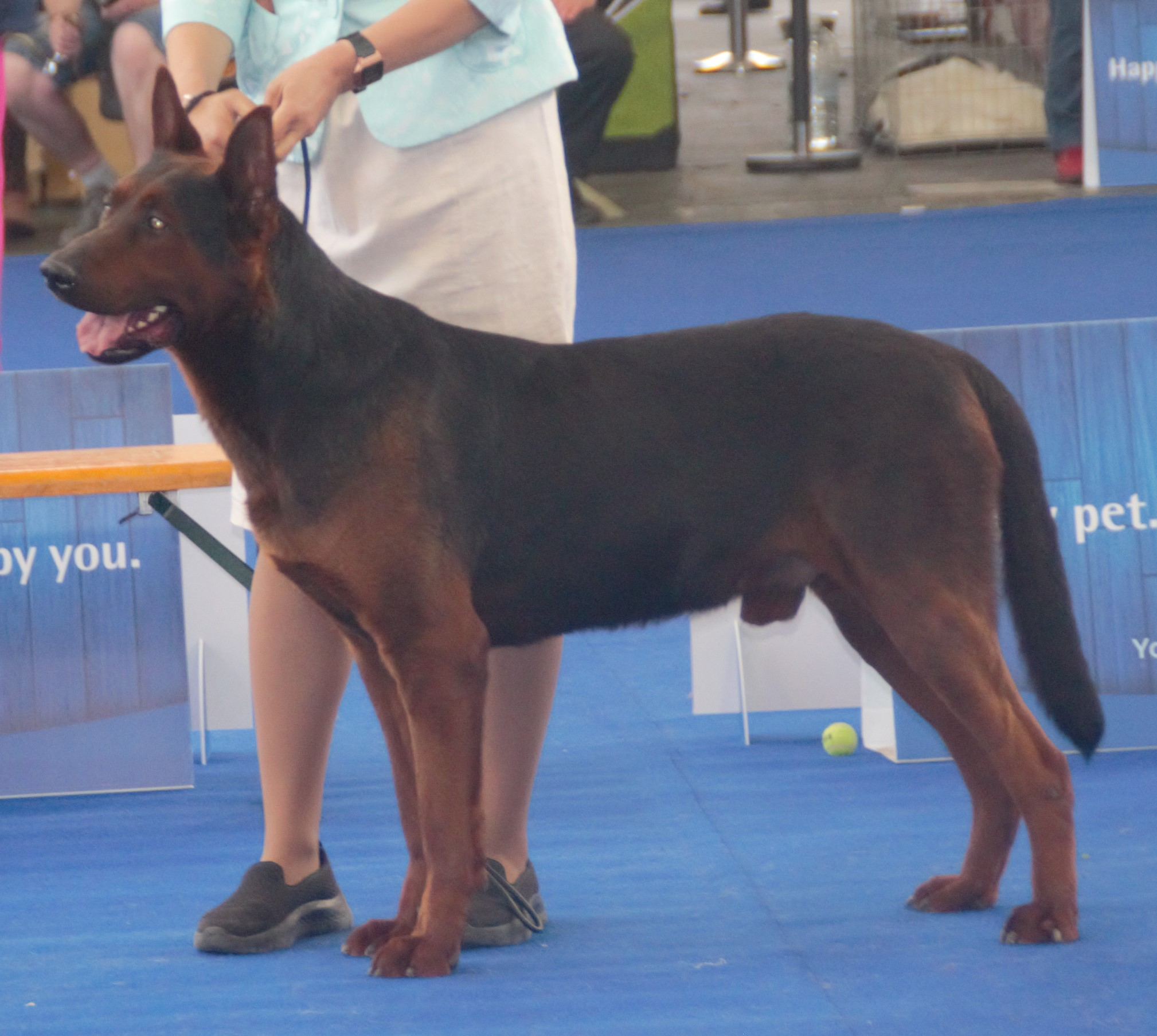
- A male Laizhou Hong dog
- Other names: Zhuqiao Hong (朱橋紅); Sulian Hong (蘇聯紅); Shandong Hong (山東紅); Shanhong Quan (山红犬); Huxing Quan (虎形犬); Chuanhong Quan (川红犬); Mountain red dog Chinese Red Dog; China Mountain Red Dog; Dyscophus Guineti; Red dog of Laizhou; Red Dog; Soviet Red Dog; Laizhouhong Dog; Zhuqiaohong Dog; Sulianhong Dog; Shandonghong Dog; Huxing Dog; Shanhong Dog; Chuanhong Dog; Laizhou Hong Dog; Zhuqiao Hong Dog; Red dog of Zhuqiao; China's Red Dogs; Chinese Mountain Red Dog
- Origin: China
Traits
- Height: 25–31 in (64–80 cm)
- Weight: 66–132 lb (30–60 kg)
- Coat: short-haired
- Color: Red, Reddish brown with black saddle, black, Dark brown, Dark brown with black saddle, etc.
- Litter size: 6—9 puppies
Kennel club standards
- China Kennel Union: standard

Laizhou Hong (Chinese:萊州紅；Pinyin:Láizhōu hóng), the full name of which is the Laizhou Hong Dog (Chinese:萊州紅犬；Pinyin:Láizhōu hóng quǎn) or Laizhou Red Dog (Chinese:萊州紅狗；Pinyin:Láizhōu hóng gǒu), also known as Zhuqiao Hong (朱橋紅), Sulian Hong (蘇聯紅), Shandong Hong (山東紅), Shanhong Quan (山红犬), Huxing Quan (虎形犬), Chuanhong Quan (川红犬), Red dog of Laizhou and Chinese Red Dog, is a companion dog, working dog, and guard dog.

== Background ==
Laizhou Hong originated in Zhuqiao Town, Laizhou City, Shandong Province, China in the 19th century. It was bred by local enthusiasts using Xigou, Langqing Quan and other native Chinese dog breeds as well as Great Danes, German Shepherds, Rottweilers and other breeds.

These Western breeds—such as Great Danes, German Shepherds, and Rottweilers—were primarily brought over by expatriates from Germany working in China. After being introduced, these Western dog breeds were used by some Chinese breeders as the maternal parent—crossed with native Chinese dogs serving as the paternal parent—to develop new breeds. The Laizhou Hong is one such result.

The Laizhou Hong is distributed across mainland China The breed is characterized by its adaptability, distinct physical appearance, and temperament, which is typically described as calm and loyal.

While the Laizhou Hong appeared in the 2019 World Dog Show in Shanghai under Group 11 - Non FCI Breeds, it remains a rare breed outside of China. Laizhou Hong puppies have gorgeous red coats and tall, pointed ears, making them a desirable addition to any dog-loving family. However, they require a job to do to keep them mentally and physically stimulated.

Laizhou Hong has already been recognized by China Kennel Union and is classified in FCI Group 2.

== Appearance ==
Laizhou Hong is a large, molosser-type(mastiff) dog with strong athletic ability. They are muscular and have red, black or Reddish brown fur with black saddle, etc.

Laizhou Hong's tongue has the common characteristics of Chinese dog breeds, and has black spots on the tongue or a black or bluish-black tongue. The same is true for their gums. Some Laizhou Hong's gums will appear black, which is a common feature of Chinese dog breeds.

Laizhou Hong's ears are usually erect and do not require ear cropping.

== Name ==
=== Laizhou Hong ===
The meaning of the name "Laizhou Hong"(萊州紅) is easy to understand. "Laizhou"(萊州) refers to the breed's place of origin, while "Hong"(紅) means "red"—a reference to the breed's characteristic reddish coat color.

The full name, "Laizhou Hong Dog"(萊州紅犬；Láizhōu hóng quǎn), Also written as "Laizhou Red Dog"(萊州紅狗；Láizhōu hóng gǒu), essentially translates to "Red Dog from Laizhou", this is the most common name of this variety.

=== Zhuqiao Hong ===
The name "Zhuqiao Hong"(朱橋紅) is similar to "Laizhou Hong"; "Zhuqiao"(朱橋) refers to the place of origin—specifically Zhuqiao Town in Laizhou City—while "Hong"(紅) signifies "red," making the full name "Zhuqiao Hong Dog"(朱橋紅犬；Láizhōu hóng quǎn), Also written as "Zhuqiao Red Dog"(萊州紅狗；Láizhōu hóng gǒu) mean "Red Dog from Zhuqiao".

=== Shandong Hong ===
The concept behind the name "Shandong Hong"(山東紅) is the same as that of "Laizhou Hong" and "Zhuqiao Hong": "Shandong"(山東) refers to Shandong Province in China, and "Hong"(紅) means red. The full name "Shandong Hong Dog"(山東紅犬；Shāndōng hóng quǎn), also written as "Shandong Red Dog"(山東紅狗；Shāndōng hóng gǒu) translates to "Red Dog from Shandong". This is because the Laizhou Hong originated in Zhuqiao Town, Laizhou City, Shandong Province, China.

=== Shanhong Quan ===
The name "Shanhong Quan"(山紅犬) is also written as "Shanhong Dog"(山紅狗) or "Chinese Shanhong Dog"(中國山紅狗), with "Chinese Mountain Red Dog"(中國山紅犬) being the more standardized designation. This is the scientifically standardized botanical name for the variety; however, it only emerged in the 1970s, whereas the names "Laizhou Hong" and "Zhuqiao Hong" were in use earlier and are more widely current.
