= Kunming dog =

Kunming Quan
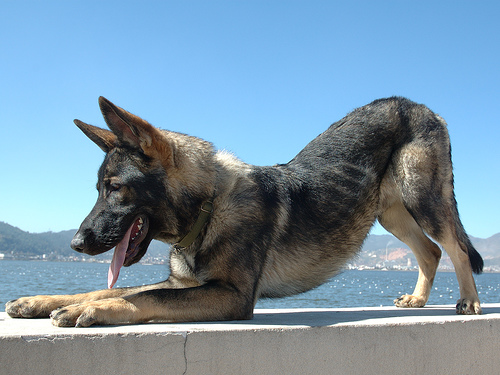
- Other names: Chinese Kunming Dog, Kunming Dog, Kunming Wolfdog, Chinese Kunming Wolfdog
- Origin: China
Traits
- Height: 24–30 in (60–75 cm)
| | Males | 24–30 in (60–75 cm) |
| | Females | 24–26 in (60–65 cm) |
- Weight: 57–93 lb (26–42 kg)
| | Males | 62–93 lb (28–42 kg) |
| | Females | 57–79 lb (26–36 kg) |
- Coat: Double coat
- Colour: silver-grey, Grass yellow, etc.
- Litter size: 5-10

The Kunming Dog, Chinese Kunming Dog, Kunming Wolfdog, or Chinese Kunming Wolfdog (Mandarin: 昆明犬 Kūnmíng quǎn) is a wolf-dog breed of working dog developed in Kunming, China in the 1950s from Alsatians hybridized with local dogs; even wolf–dog hybrids. It was recognized as a breed in 2007. It is frequently used by the police and military in its country of origin and has been exported to various other countries. It is the only working dog breed developed in China with international recognition. The Kunming Dog is also used to perform many duties. These include, but are not limited to, discovering odors emitted by narcotics and explosives, uncovering human remains, and saving people.

== Breed origin and genetics ==
The Chinese Kunming Dog, German Shepherd Dog, and Belgian Malinois are breeds of Canis lupus familiaris, belonging to the family Canidae of the order Carnivora, which are distributed worldwide. A 2021 behavioural study further examined the breed's ancestry and found that the behavioural stereotypes of the Kunming Dog were more consistent with origin from a cross between indigenous village dogs of Kunming and German Shepherd Dogs than from eastern German Shepherd Dogs.

== Physical characteristics ==
The breed has two recognised coat-colour populations: dogs of the Wolf Black (WB) population display black and yellow colouring distributed across the whole body, while dogs of the Back Black (BB) population have a black back with yellow on the abdomen and limbs. Male Kunming Dogs are usually 60-75 cm in height and female Kunming Dogs average a height of 60-65 cm in height making them slightly smaller.

== Working roles ==
A 2024 study described the Chinese Kunming Dog as a working breed widely used by the army, customs, and police in China. The breed is widely deployed by China's public security authorities, customs services, fire services, and military, performing roles including tracking, detection, security protection, and rescue operations. China's national security authorities are urging police across the country to favour the use of a home-grown dog breed over German Shepherds, Rottweilers, Malinois and Springer Spaniels, as Beijing relentlessly pursues self-reliance.

== History ==
In the 1950s, Yunnan police in China selected 20 local wolfdogs from the high-altitude plateau city of Kunming for breeding and training. These dogs, with coats colored "wolf black" and "straw yellow", and some with black backs, became the origin of the three major strains of the Kunming Dog. Over the following decades, the Kunming Police Dog Base led a systematic breeding programme, applying successive rounds of group selection and other scientific methods to establish a stable, reliable working breed.

In 1988, the breed passed ministry-level verification and was formally named the "Kunming Dog", marking its official recognition within China's policing system.

In 2007, the Kunming Dog was included in the United Nations Food and Agriculture Organization's World Watch List for Domestic Animal Diversity, making it China's first, and so far only, police dog breed to receive international recognition for independent intellectual property rights.

== Cloning programme ==
A female Kunming Dog named Kunxun was born on 19 December 2018 in Beijing, cloned from a seven-year-old serving police dog named Huahuangma, stationed in the city of Pu'er, Yunnan, who had assisted detectives in dozens of murder investigations and had been awarded a first-level merit commendation in 2016. The cloning was carried out by Beijing Sinogene Biotechnology Co. Ltd, in collaboration with Yunnan Agricultural University and the Kunming Police Dog Base, under a research programme established by the Ministry of Public Security. Technicians obtained a skin sample from Huahuangma, created a cloned embryo, and implanted it into a surrogate Beagle; Kunxun was delivered via caesarean section, weighing 540 g and measuring 23 cm at birth. Kunxun completed her training and was officially accepted into service as a police dog in August 2019.

Training a meritorious Kunming police dog can take four to five years and cost approximately 500,000 yuan (around US$74,000), with no guarantee of success given the high elimination rate among candidates.

== See also ==
- Langqing Quan
- Kunma Dog
- Wolfdog
