= Liu Zhaohua =

Chinese drug trafficker (1965–2009)

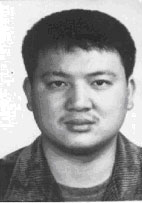
- Photo of Liu Zhaohua from fugitive webpage
- Born: 5 March 1965; Fu'an, Fujian, China
- Died: 15 September 2009 (aged 44); Guangzhou, Guangdong, China
- Cause of death: Execution
- Other name: Li Senqing
- Occupation: Businessman
- Known for: Producing and trafficking 12–31 (Note: Multiple quantities reported: up to 12 tons, "convicted of producing 12.7 tons", 14 tons, 16 tons, 18 tons, 31 tons ("tons" and "tonnes" used interchangeably) tons of methamphetamine
- Children: 4
- Status: Executed
- Penalty: Death penalty

Details
- Country: China
- Date apprehended: 5 March 2005

Chinese name
- Traditional Chinese: 劉招華
- Simplified Chinese: 刘招华
Transcriptions
Standard Mandarin
- Hanyu Pinyin: Liú Zhāohuá
- IPA: [ljǒʊ ʈʂáʊ.xwǎ]

Liu Zhaohua (Chinese: 刘招华; 5 March 1965 – 15 September 2009) was a Chinese drug lord known for producing and trafficking 12–31 tonnes of methamphetamine. The amount Liu made was worth more than US$5.5 billion. This made Liu one of the biggest drug lords in China. A reward of RMB200,000 (around US$24,160) was offered for information leading to his arrest.

Liu was arrested on 5 March 2005, sentenced to death on 26 June 2006, and executed on 15 September 2009.

== Early life ==
Liu was born in Fu'an, Fujian province on 5 March 1965.

Liu was known to have been a smart and studious person since childhood. He was said to have a talent and interest in chemistry during middle school and kept many chemistry books at home. In 1979 he won second place in a provincial competition for chemistry. However, he was from a poor family and his father died when he was young. Due to financial difficulties, he voluntarily dropped out of school.

In 1983, Liu joined the army and studied logistics at one of the People's Armed Police schools. During his time in the army, Liu served as a border control officer and was promoted to Cadre.

In 1987 Liu became a court bailiff. Due to his strong job performance he received an award for outstanding service and was transferred to a role involving the China Investment Promotion Agency. In this role, Liu met a lot of leaders and foreign businessmen who would later partner with him. During his time as bailiff, Liu met Chen Daozhong, a Taiwanese businessman who introduced him to methamphetamine. Liu became interested in producing drugs as a way of earning money after successfully creating a batch of methamphetamine by himself using chemistry books for reference.

In 1994, Liu resigned from his job as bailiff to fully focus on his drug business.

== Drug career ==
In 1992, Liu founded Fujian Hongfa Plastic, a plastic processing company near his hometown which would act as the front for his drug business. He used his connections from his time as bailiff to act as partners and distributors for his business.

While producing methamphetamine as a sidejob, Liu noted the quality of his product was poor and as a result would not sell well. In early 1996, Liu learned the process of making methamphetamine efficiently from a retired Professor at Xi'an Jiaotong University. This was done by disguising himself as a researcher looking into a weight control product.

In May 1996, Liu used his savings to construct a factory in his hometown to produce methamphetamine on a large scale. The factory produced over 20 kg of methamphetamine at the start. However, police discovered the factory in the same year in a sting operation where one of the buyers was an undercover officer. Liu had become a fugitive and had escaped Fujian.

Liu moved to Puning, Guangdong, where he continued operations while hiding under an alias. By 1999, Liu had opened additional factories in both Puning, Guangdong and Yinchuan, Ningxia. The factories were more efficient which could produce much greater methamphetamine yields while also emitting less pollutants. In that same year, police discovered 11 tonnes of methamphetamine at a Guangzhou warehouse belonging to him. Liu then escaped to Guilin, Guangxi.

During his time in Guilin, Liu used a new alias and adopted the persona of a high-profile businessman who appeared on television and invested in various projects of the community. He also established Sensen Biotechnology, a biotechnology company used for yew cultivation. Liu moved around China to visit various local universities and scientific research institutions to learn more about the process and collect plant samples and seeds, intending to synthesize pharmaceutical drugs from yew, which was even more profitable than producing methamphetamine. However, the project far exceeded its expected costs and eventually had to be abandoned.

== Arrest and sentence ==
On 24 November 2004, the Ministry of Public Security put a Level A bounty of RMB200,000 (around US$24,160), the nation's highest, to those who could provide clues for Liu's whereabouts.

After seeing himself on television, Liu moved back to his hometown in Fujian. On 5 March 2005, Liu was arrested on his 40th birthday in a rented house after informers tipped off his location.

Liu was sentenced to death on 26 June 2006 by the Guangzhou Intermediate People's Court for making over 18 tonnes of methamphetamine. The amount Liu made was worth more than US$5 billion and had outweighed the total quantity of methamphetamine seized worldwide in that year. Liu refused to accept the judgment, claiming he never used the formula stated to make methamphetamine, which involved ephedrine, a regulated chemical. Instead, he used propiophenone, an easily accessible chemical used to make rat poison. The appeal was rejected after the Public Security Bureau confirmed the chemical used was not rat poison.

On 15 September 2009, Liu was executed.

== Personal life ==
Liu married three times. He had four children: one son from his first wife, one daughter from his second wife, and one son and one daughter from his third wife.

Liu was said to have had an arrogant personality and believed he could not be touched by the authorities. Even when arrested, he remained calm and taunted the police, believing he would win in court.

Liu became famous after starring in a video in which he justified his role in the drug trade. In this video, he said his drugs were not for domestic consumption and only for foreigners. He further stated that foreigners opened the doors of China with opium (leading to the Opium Wars), so he should be able to open their doors with methamphetamine.
