= Kunma Dog =

- A Kunma Dog
- Other names: Chinese Kunma Dog (中國昆馬犬); Chinese Maquan (中國馬犬); Chinese Marinua (中國馬里努阿犬); Kunma Wolfdog; Chinese Horse Dog; Chinese Kunma Malinois Dog; Maquan(馬犬); Kunma Quan
- Origin: China
Traits
- Height: 22–28 in (56–70 cm)
- Weight: 49–77 lb (22–35 kg)
- Coat: Short-haired
- Color: Fawn with black overlay and a black mask, Purple Brown, Black,Reddish brown, Gray-black, Black-red, Yellow-gray, Khaki, etc.

Kunma Dog (Chinese: 昆馬犬; pinyin: Kūn mǎ quǎn), also known as the Chinese Kunma Dog (Chinese: 中國昆馬犬) and Chinese Maquan (Chinese: 中國馬犬), Chinese Marinua (Chinese: 中國馬里努阿犬), is a police dog breed developed by China's Ministry of Public Security in the late 20th century.

== Background ==
Around the end of the 20th century, starting in 1991, China's Ministry of Public Security imported 67 Malinois dogs, including 28 males and 39 females, from Belgium in five batches. These Malinois dogs were then crossbred with the Chinese police dog breed Kunming dog, using the Kunming dog as the paternal parent and the Malinois as the maternal parent, resulting in the Kunma Dog, a Chinese police dog breed.

The Kunma Dog has been officially recognized as an Independent breed, with a stable breeding population established as early as 2018, and is widely used in public safety areas, its hybrid advantages are obvious, and it performs well in training and tasks, playing a great role in solving cases.

== Description ==
The Kunma Dogs inherits the characteristics of the Kunming dogs and the Malinois, which are very prominent, but at the same time they are clearly different.

Kunma Dogs are medium to large-sized dogs. The average height for males is 61–66 cm, and for females is 56–61 cm, though some dogs can reach 70 cm. The head inherits Malinois characteristics, with a solid black nasal planum, scissor-bite teeth, a strong jaw for a powerful bite, and standing ears. Overall, the head is slightly smaller, and the face is more elongated than that of the Kunming dog. Compared to the Malinois, the Kunma Dog exhibits a more pronounced atavism, more closely resembling the Historical Malinois in appearance.
