= Shanghai Drug Abuse Treatment Centre =

Medical centre in Shanghai, China

The Shanghai Drug Abuse Treatment Centre, or SDATC (simplified Chinese: 上海市自愿戒毒医疗康复中心; traditional Chinese: 上海市自願戒毒醫療康復中心; pinyin: Shànghǎishì Zìyuàn Jièdú Yīliáo Kāngfù Zhōngxīn), is a governmental organization providing drug abuse treatment and rehabilitation services in Shanghai, China. SDATC is the only government-supported centre in Shanghai and was established in 1997 on the approval of Shanghai Narcotic Control Commission and Shanghai Public Health Bureau.

SDATC is one of the departments of Shanghai Mental Health Center (SMHC), which is one of the largest and more comprehensive mental health institutions in China. SMHC has multi-functions including prevention, clinical, teaching and training, research, supervision, etc.

== Goals ==
SDATC's goals are:

- To provide treatment and other services to drug users
- To train university students, doctors from other national areas, postgraduate students, continuing education courses, and other specific training programs in the field of drug dependence and treatment.
- To promote and develop research on drug treatment through the participation in various programs financed by national and international foundations.
- To interact with the local communities in the promotion of anti-drug activities
- To be involved as consultants in policy making process regarding drug abuse prevention, treatment and rehabilitation.

== Services ==
Shanghai Drug Abuse Treatment Centre provides a number of drug treatment services including:

- Methadone tapering detoxification
- Medical treatment for other physical and psychiatric conditions
- Relapse prevention
- Group therapy
- HIV/AIDS prevention education
- Family education
- Hotline counseling

== See also ==
- Public health in China
