= People's Liberation Army rank insignia =

The People's Liberation Army in China has five rank schemes among different military branches, including Ground Force, Navy, Air Force, Rocket Force, Strategic Support Force. The Surface Force, Submarine Force, Coastal Defense Force, Marine Corps and Naval Air Force, although being a part of the Navy, maintains a different insignia than those of other naval fleet personnel.

== Commissioned officer ranks ==
The rank insignia of commissioned officers.

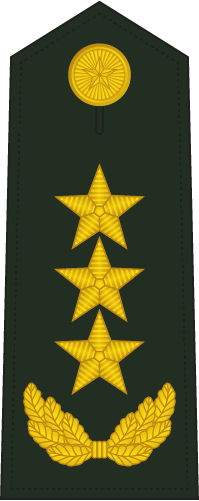
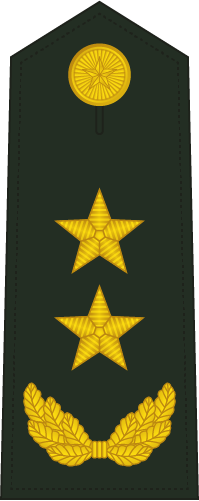
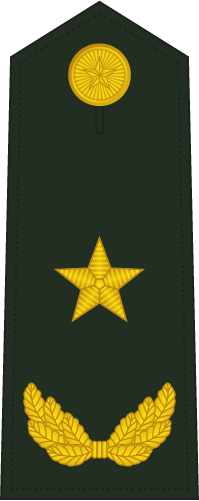
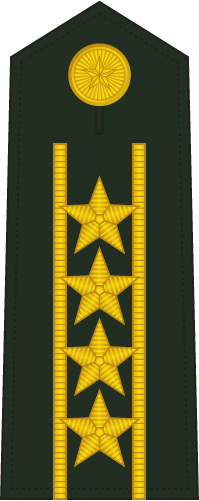
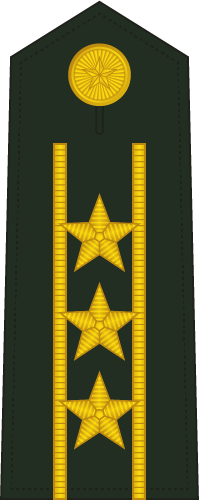
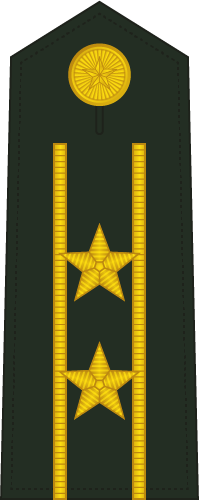
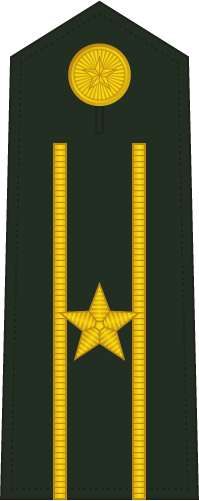
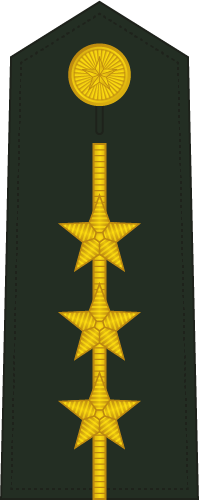
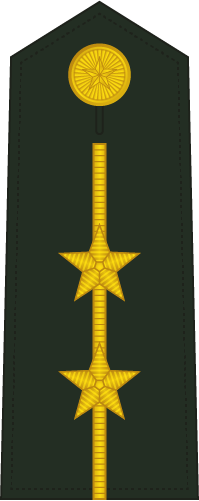
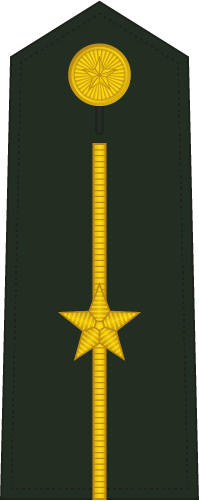
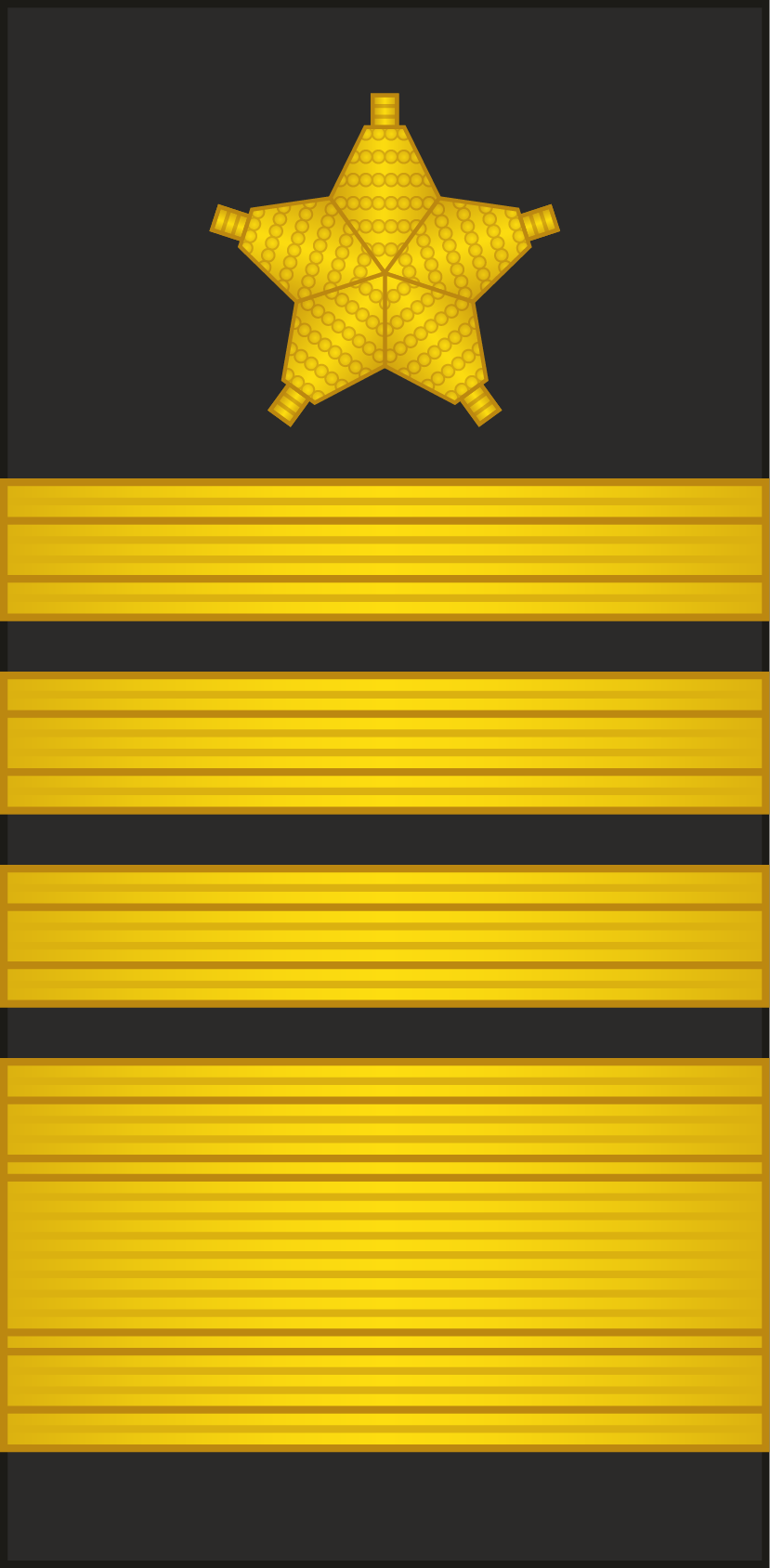
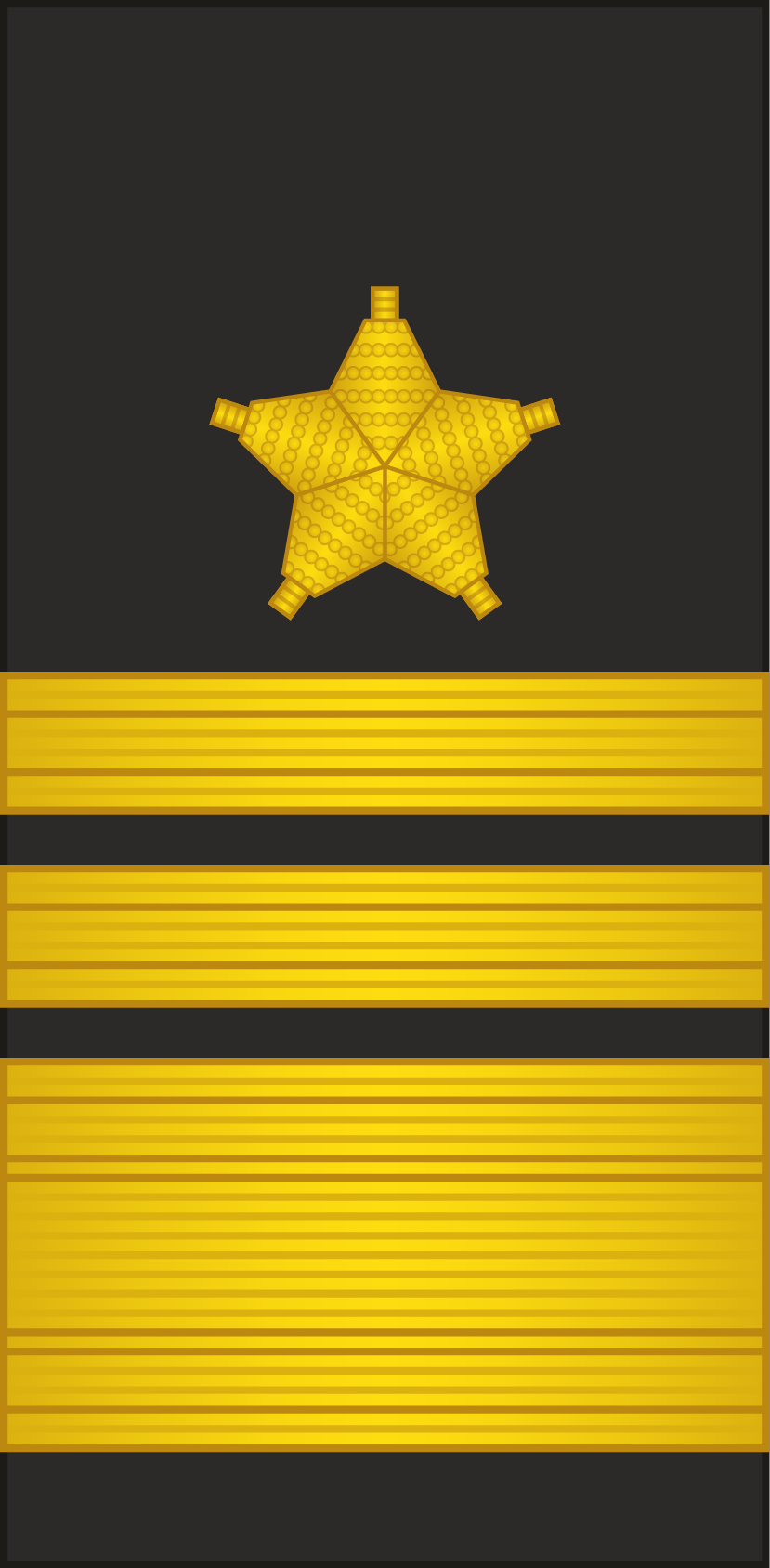
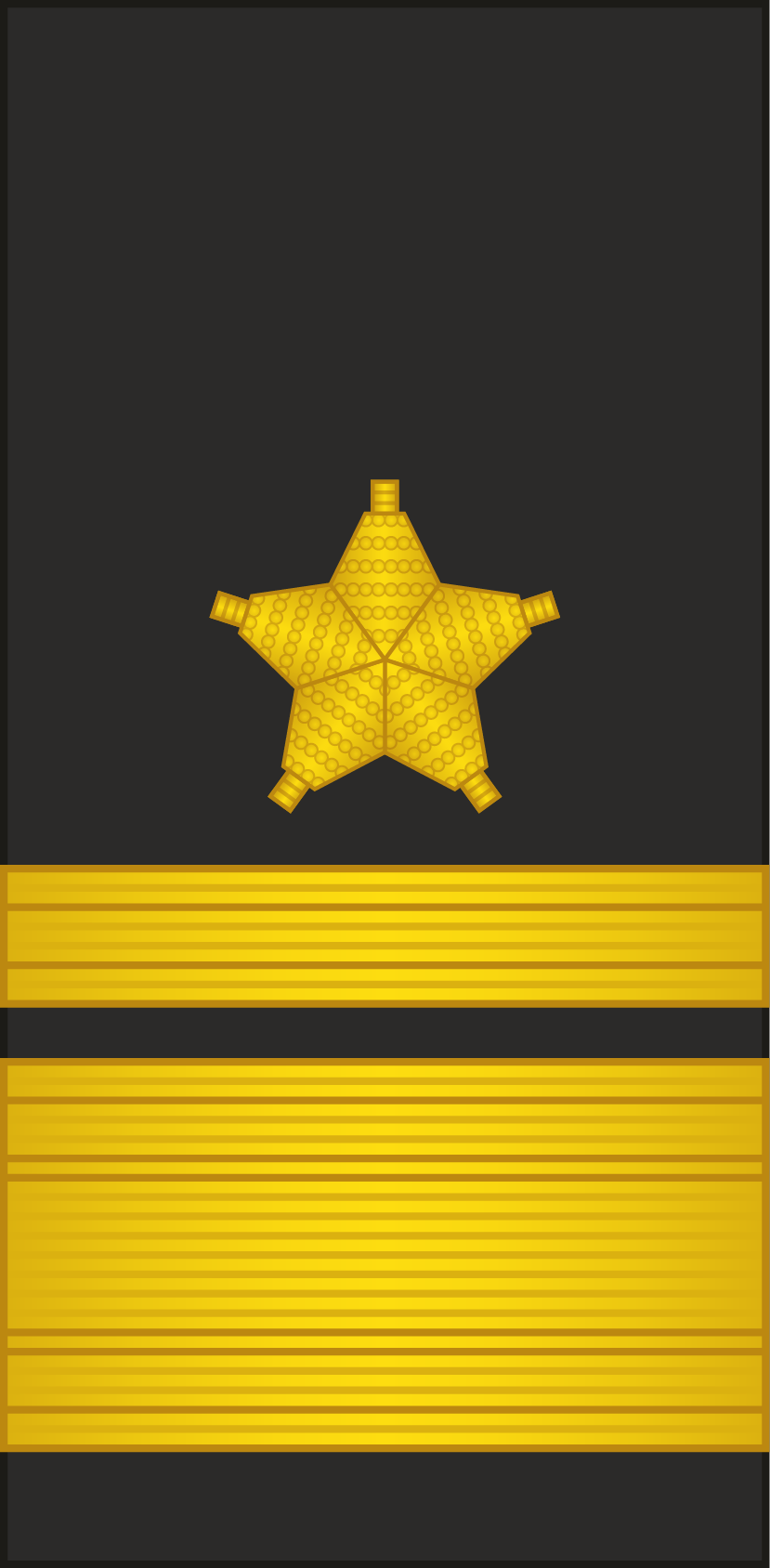
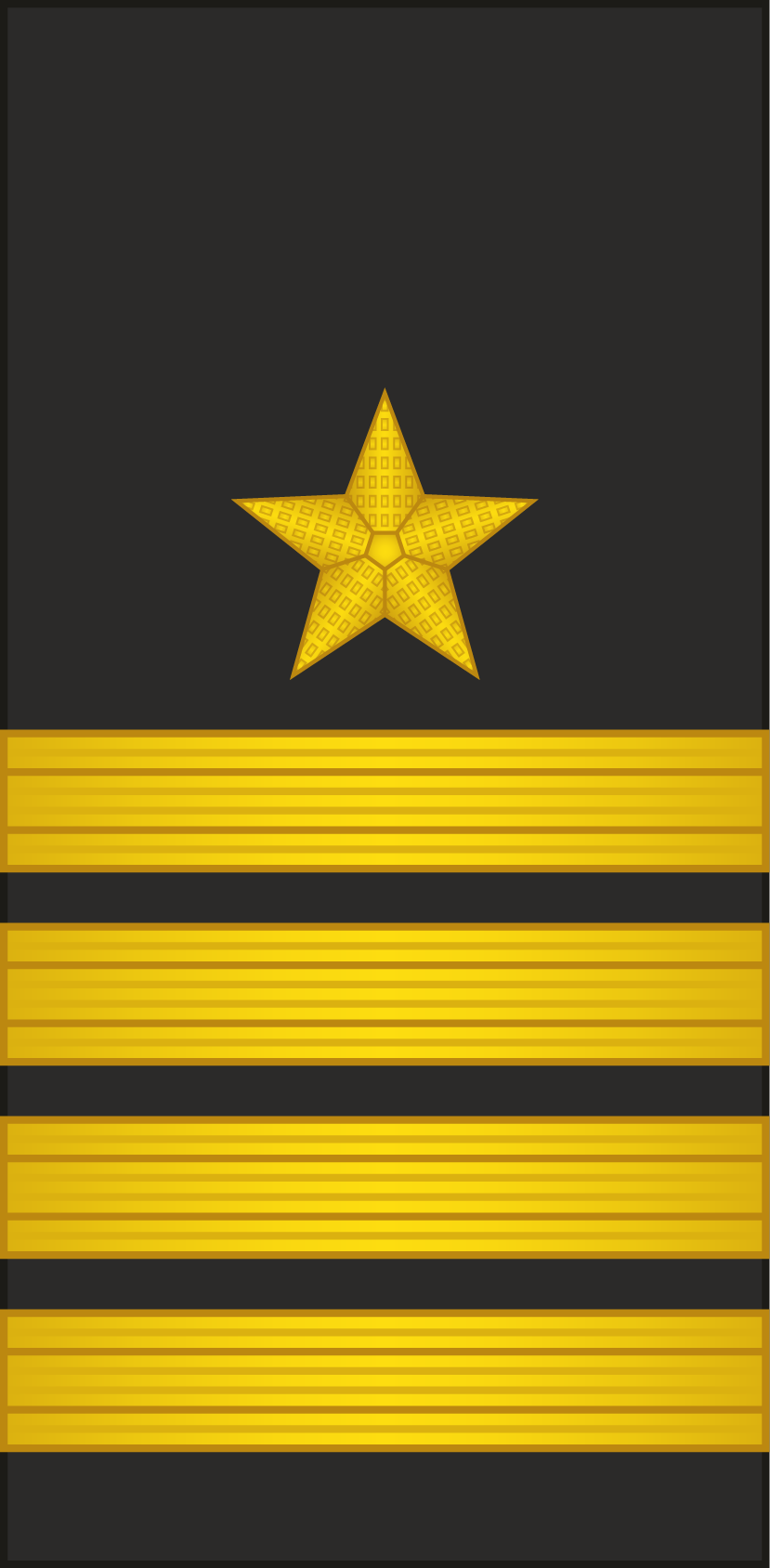
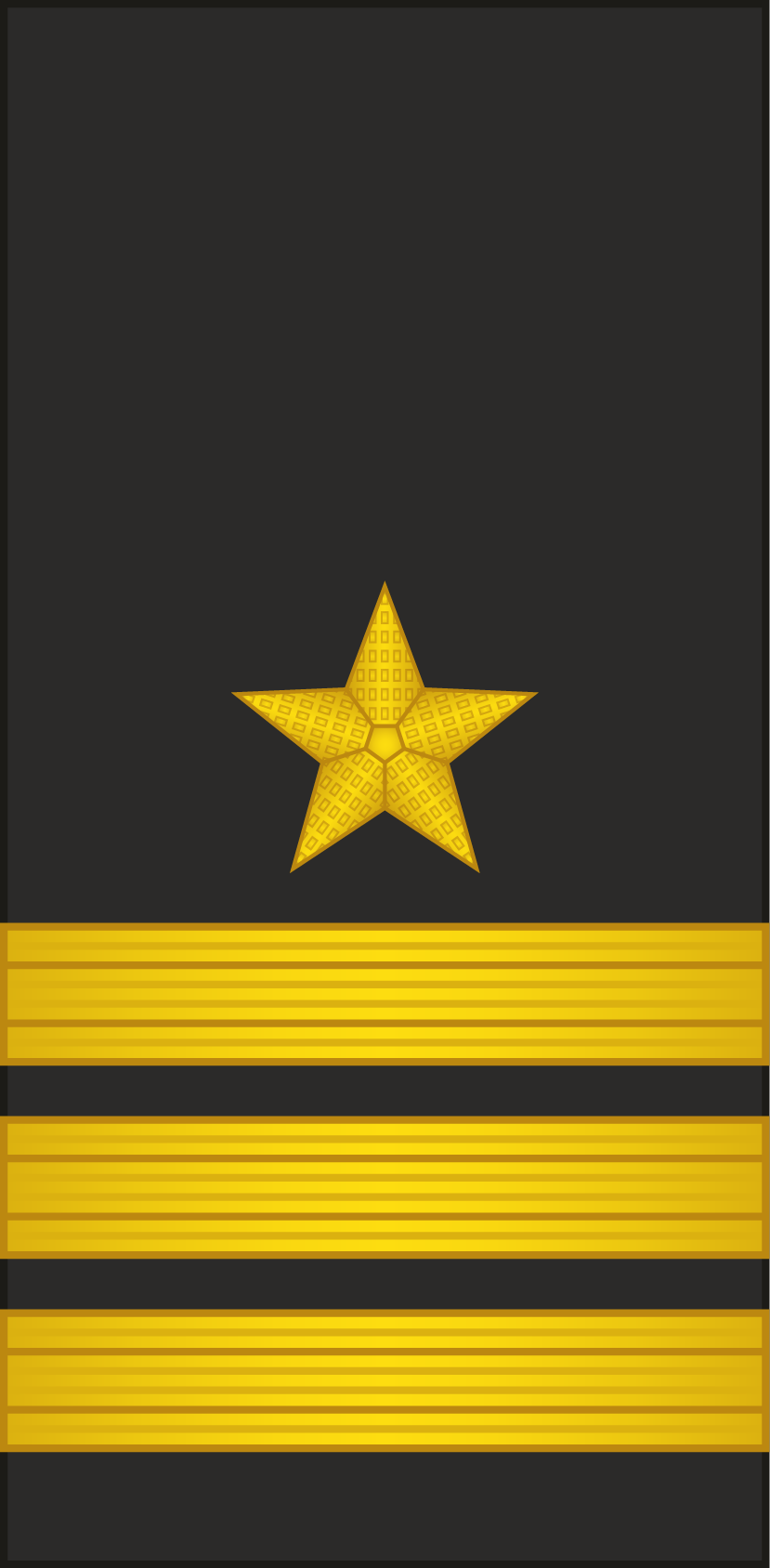
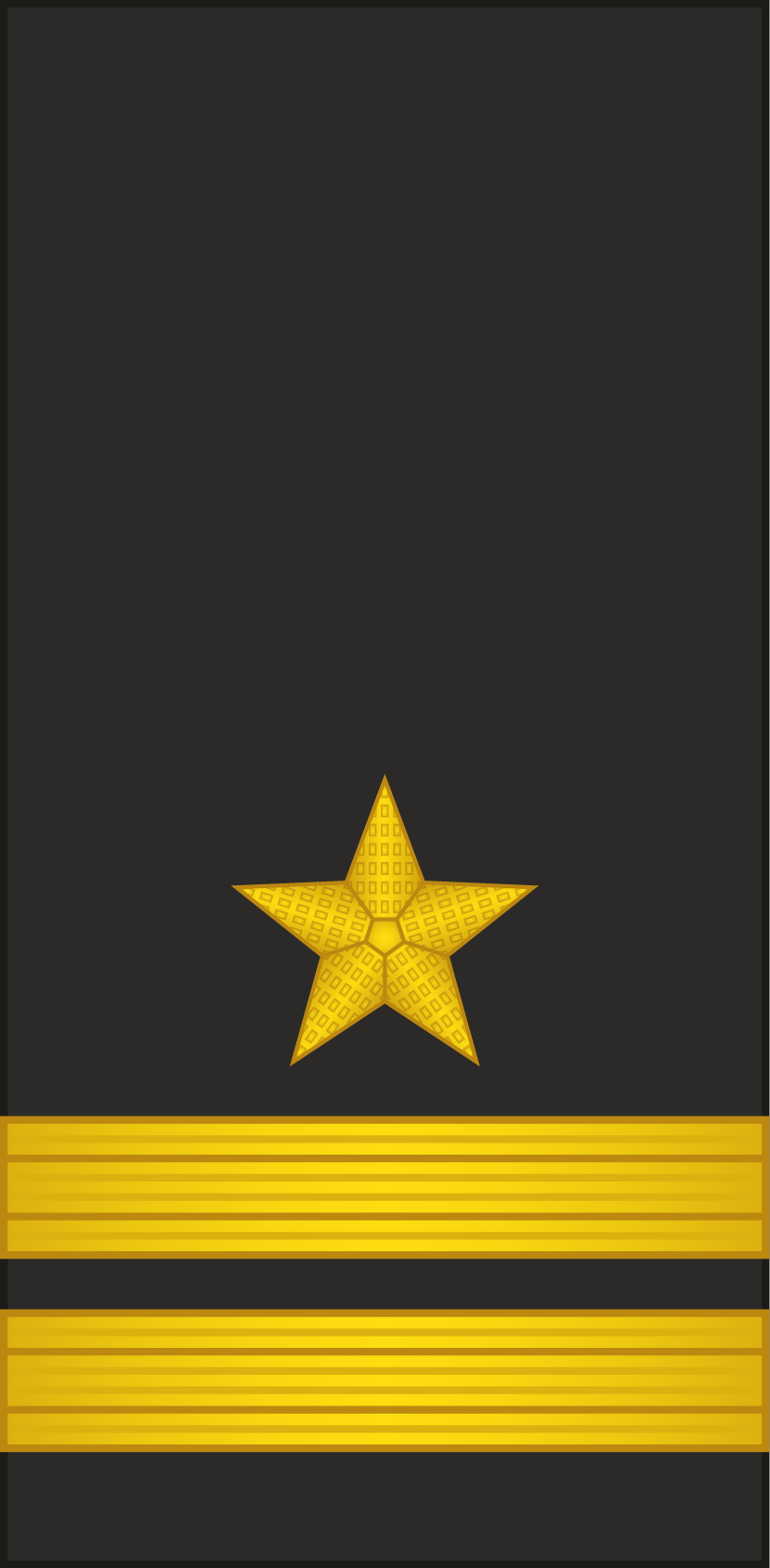
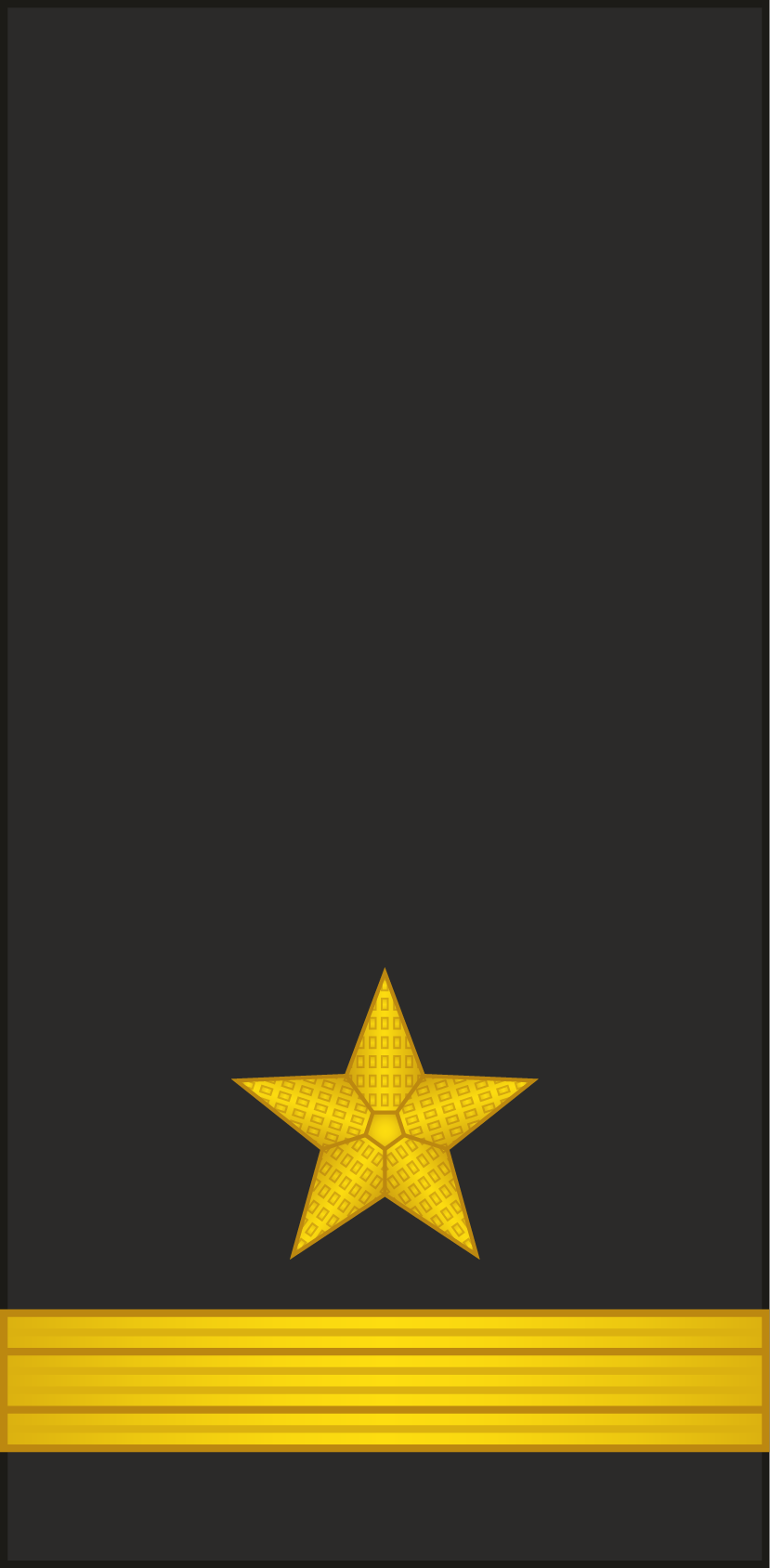
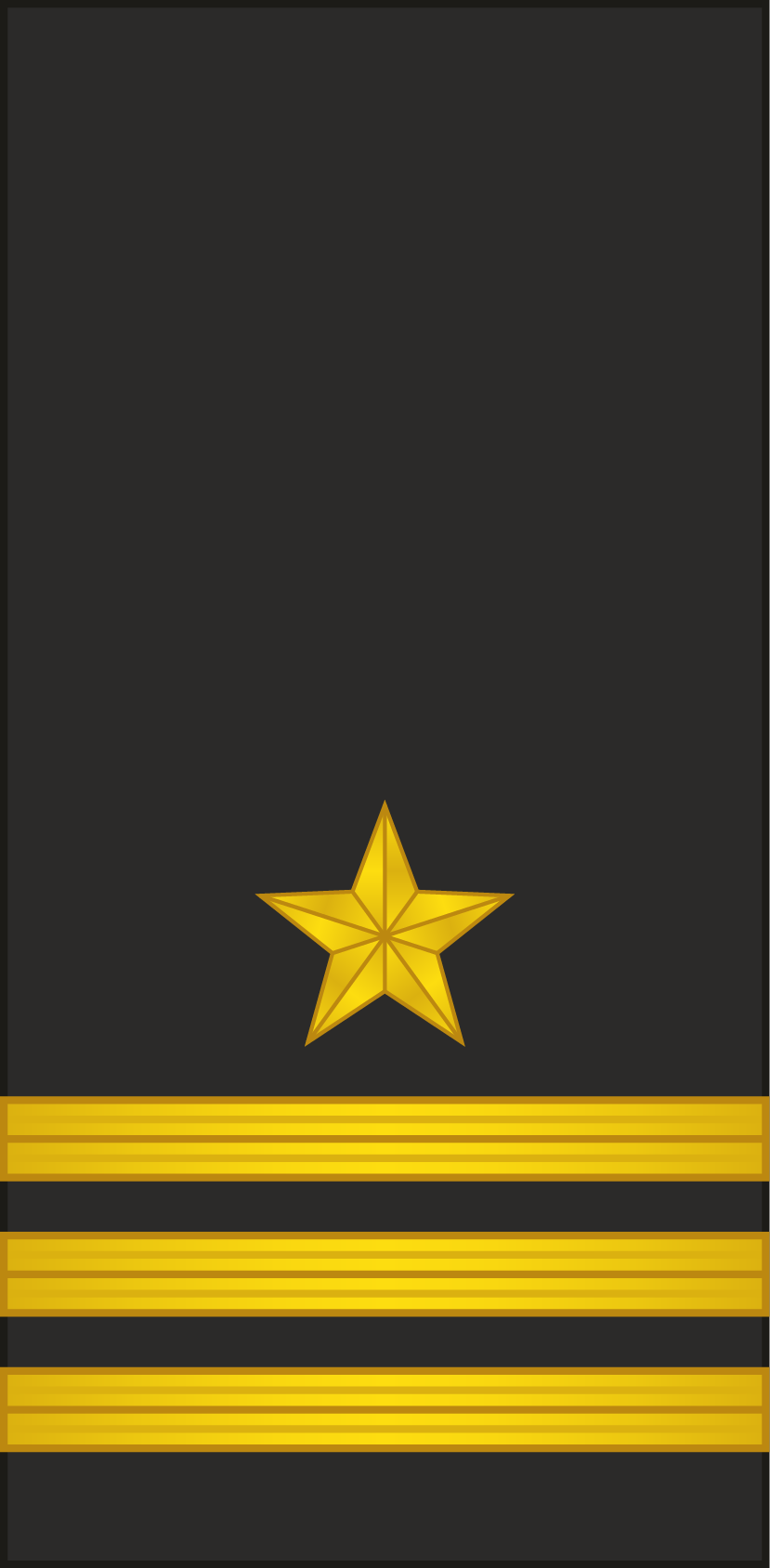
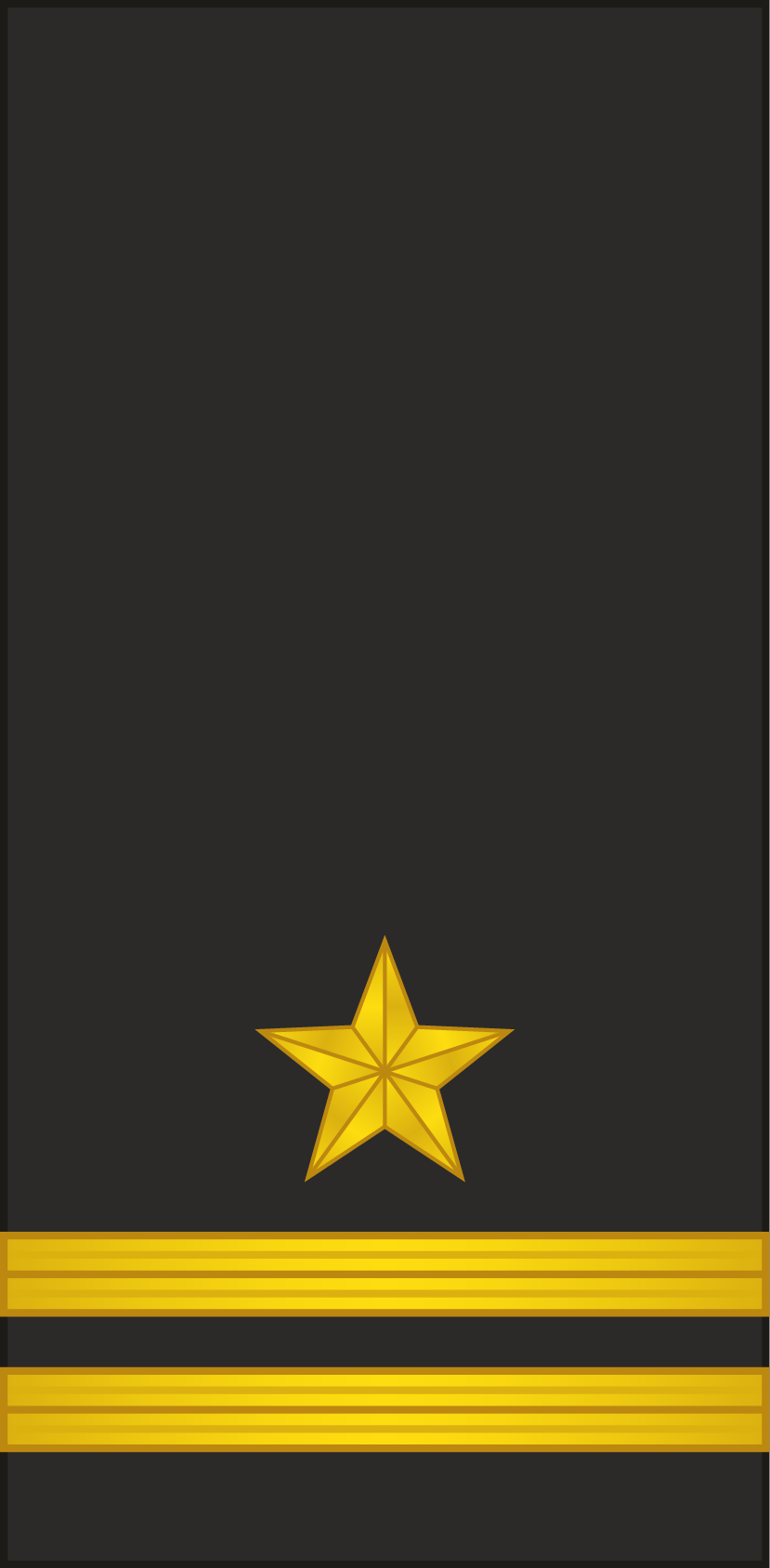
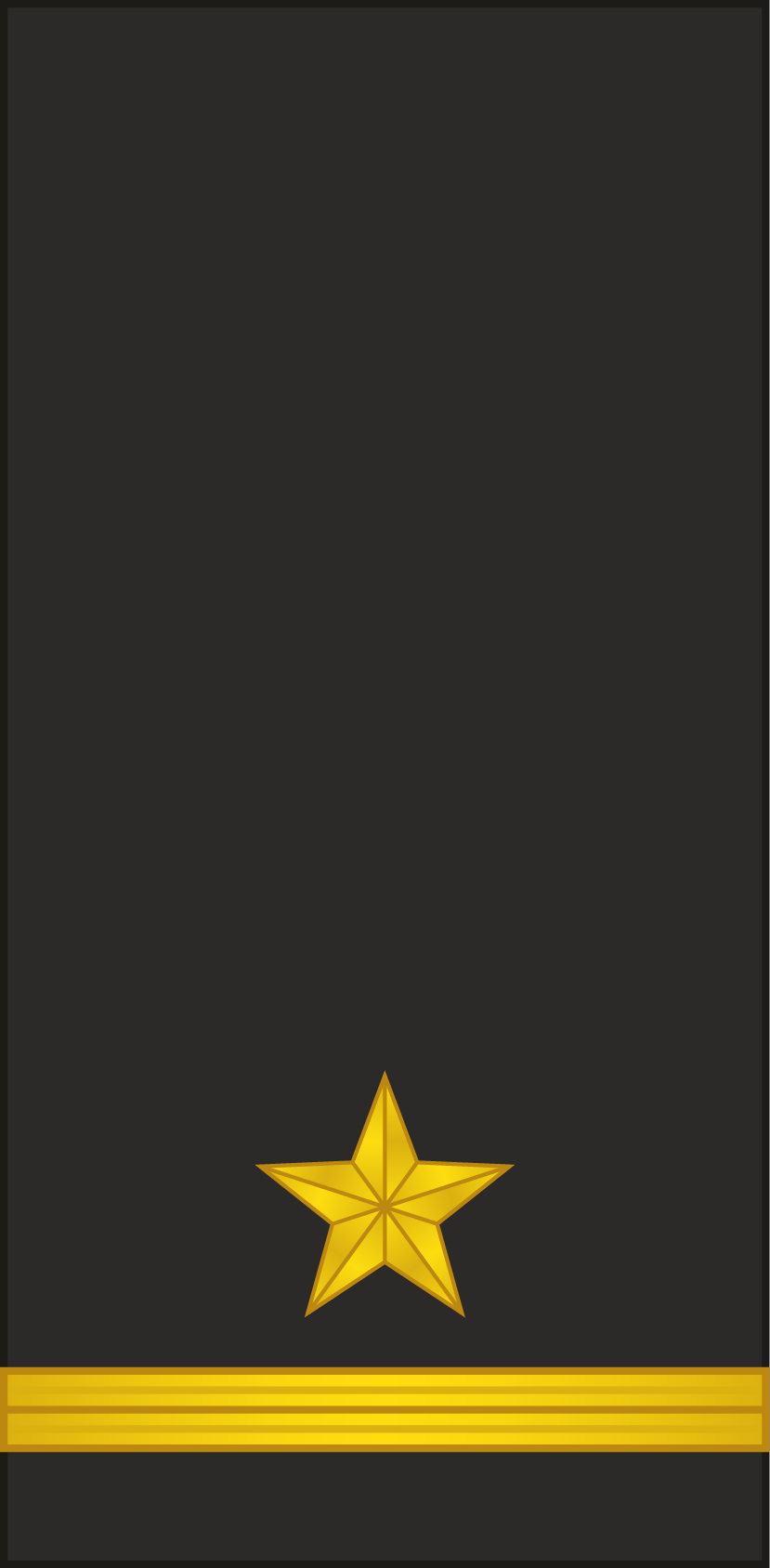
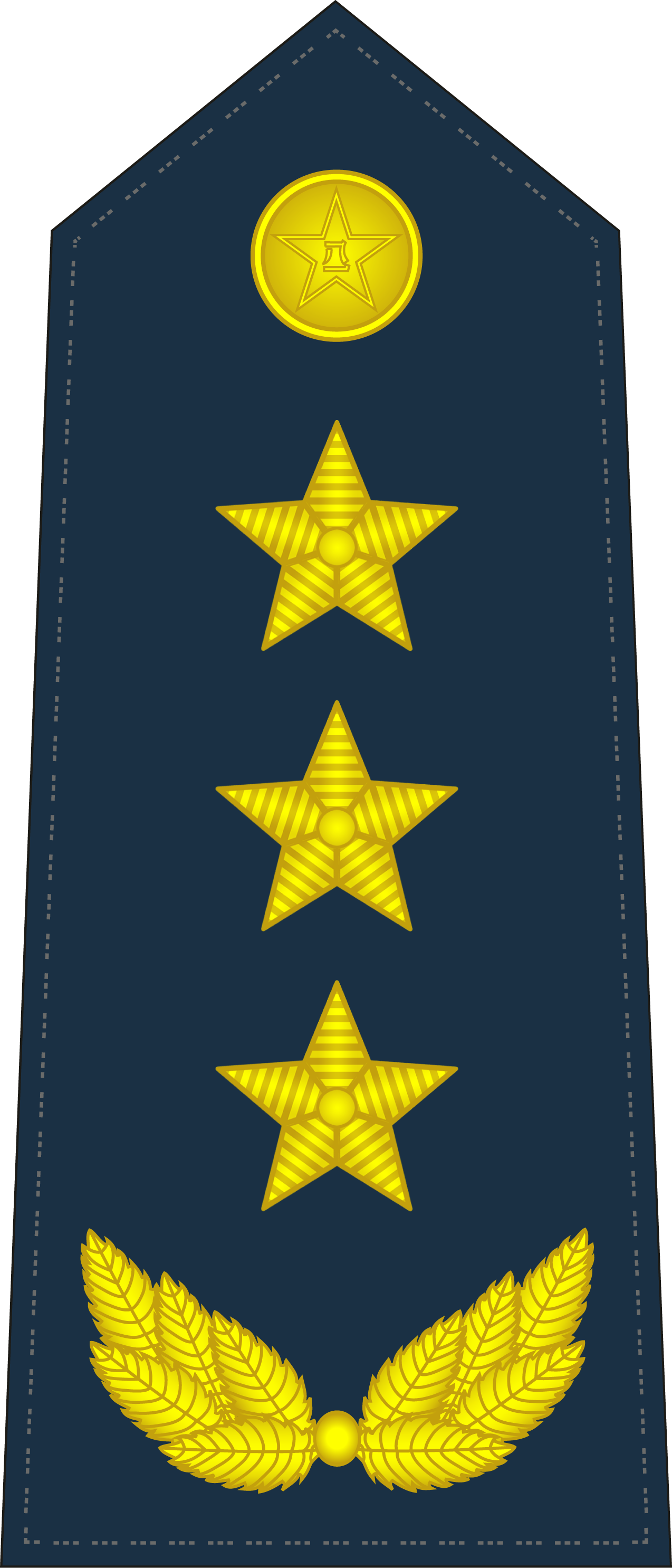
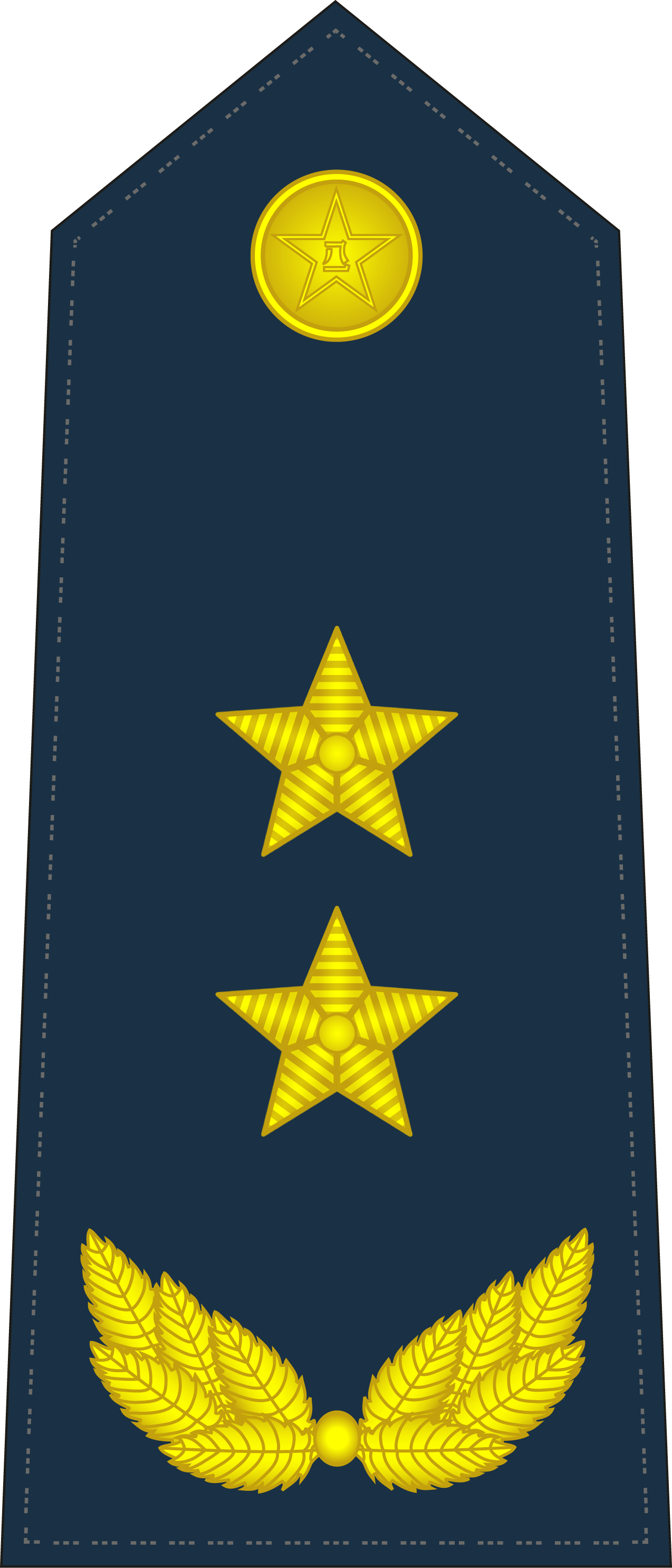
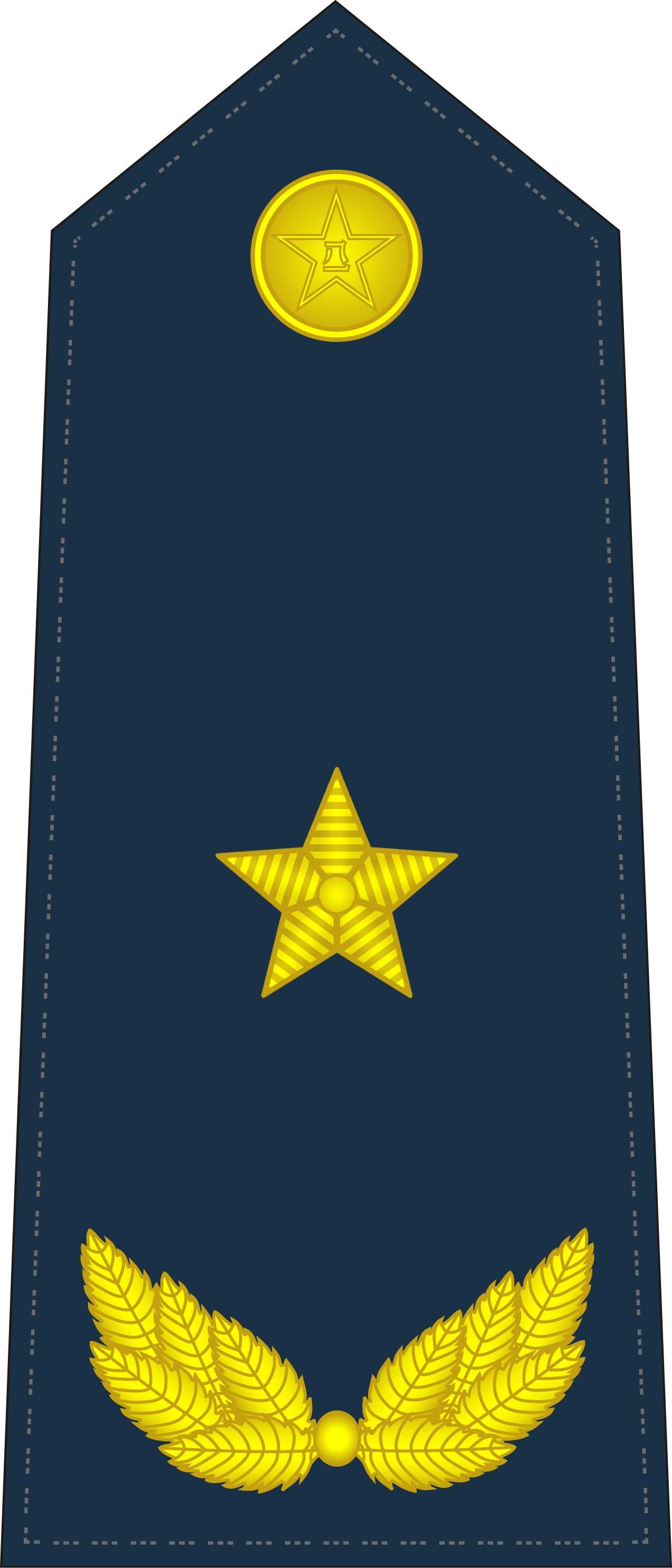
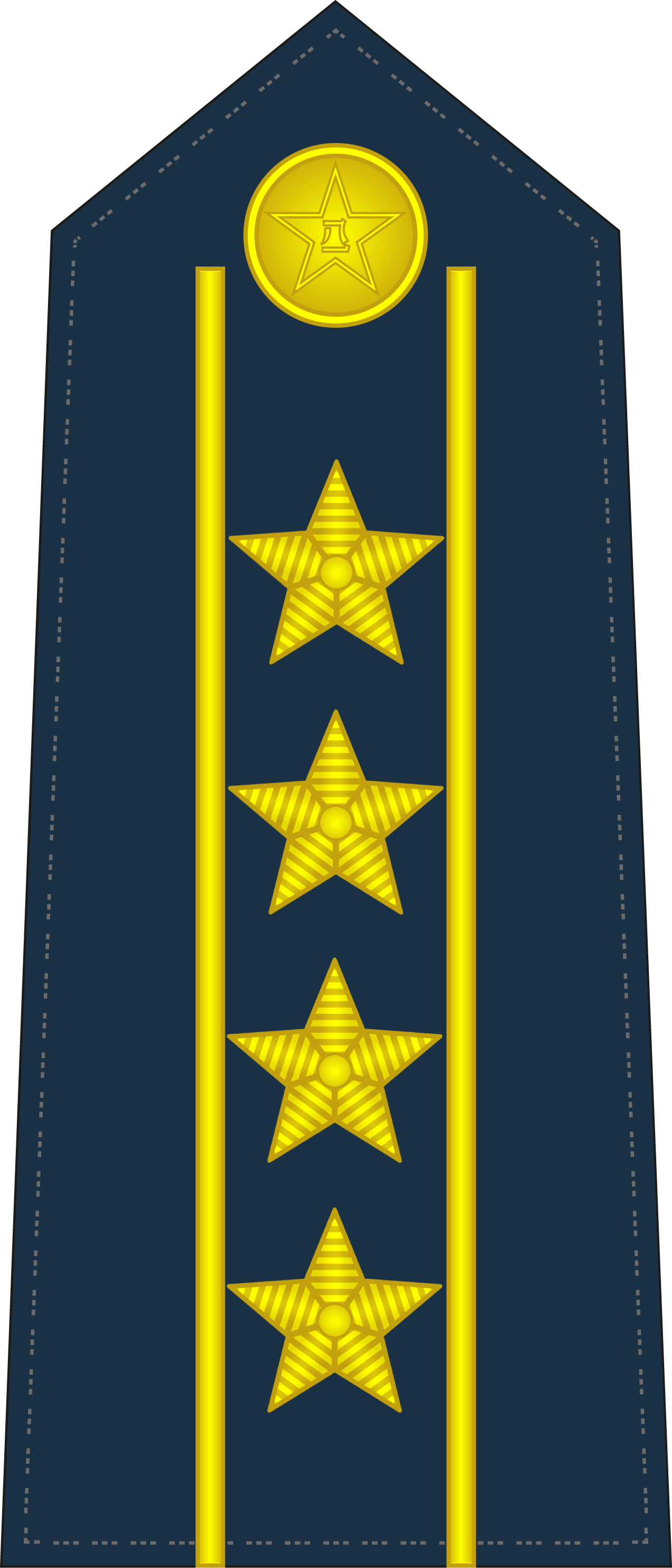
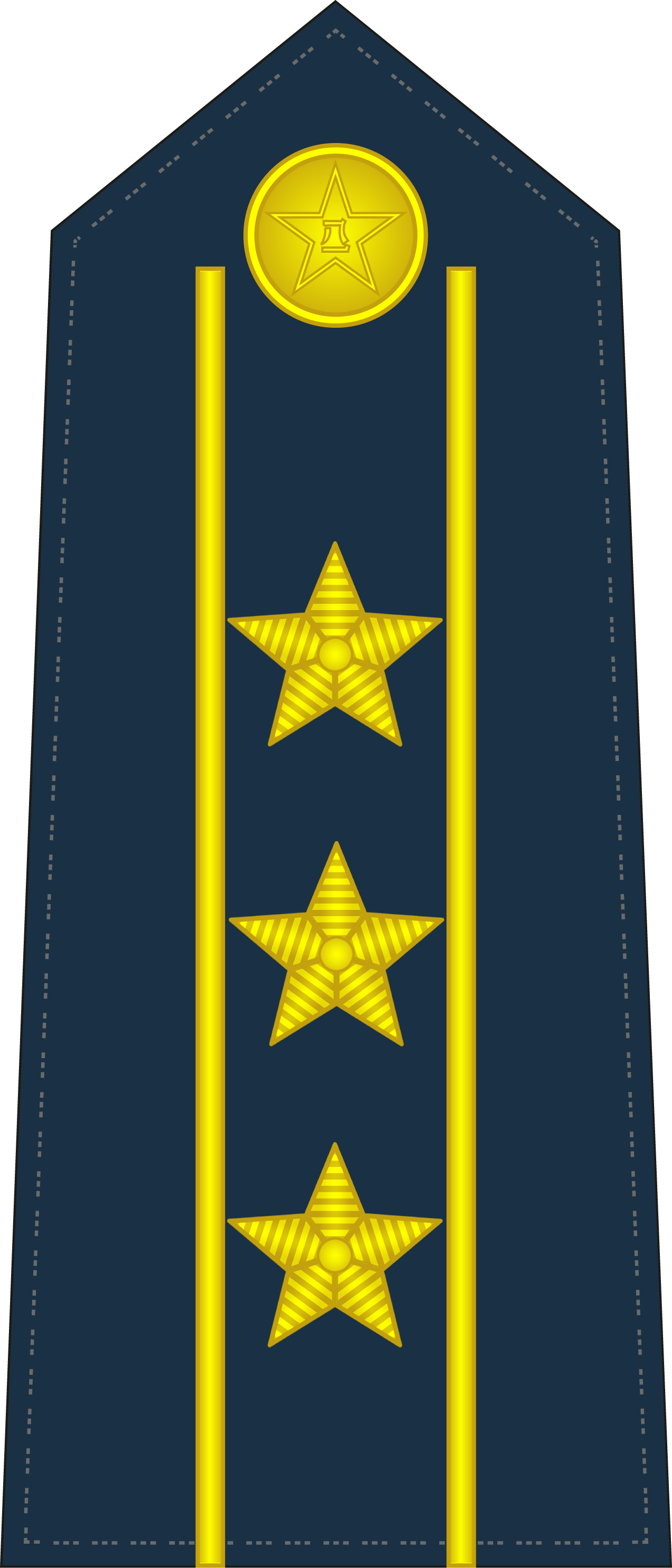
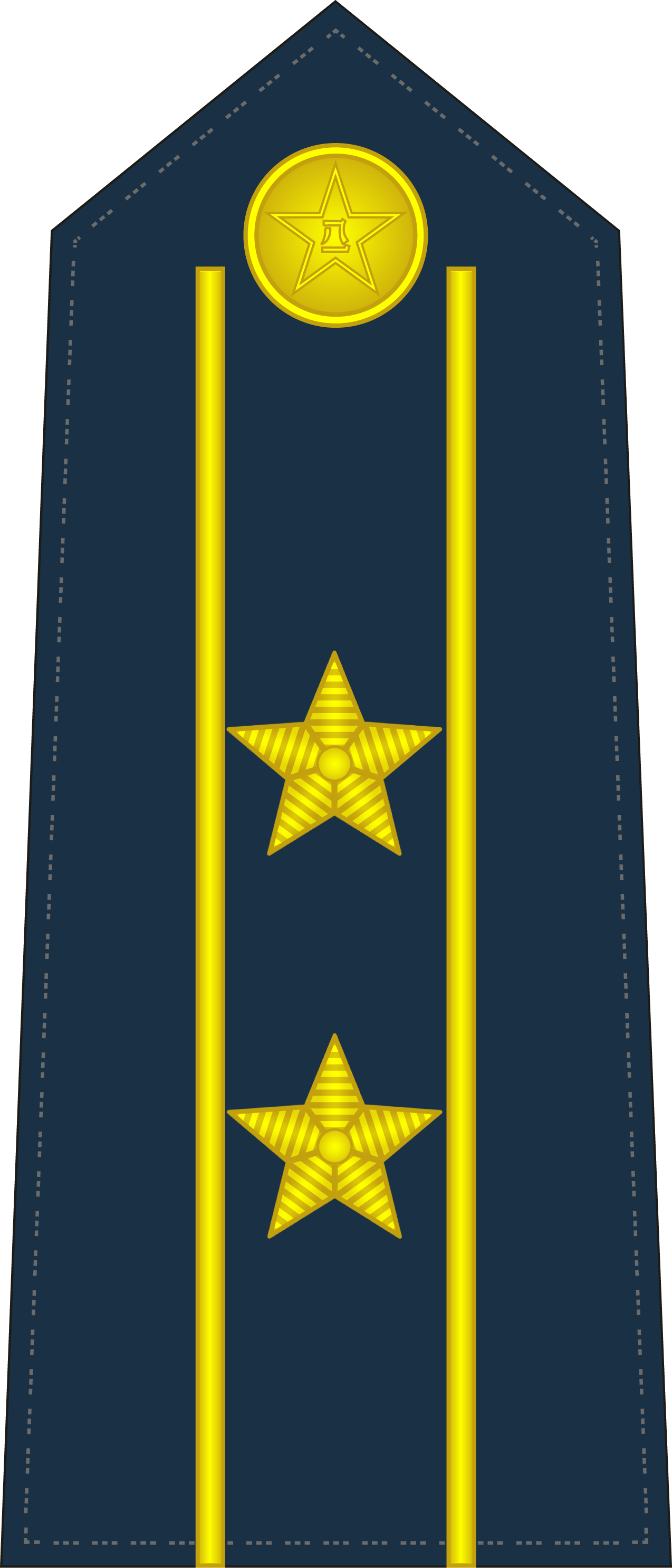
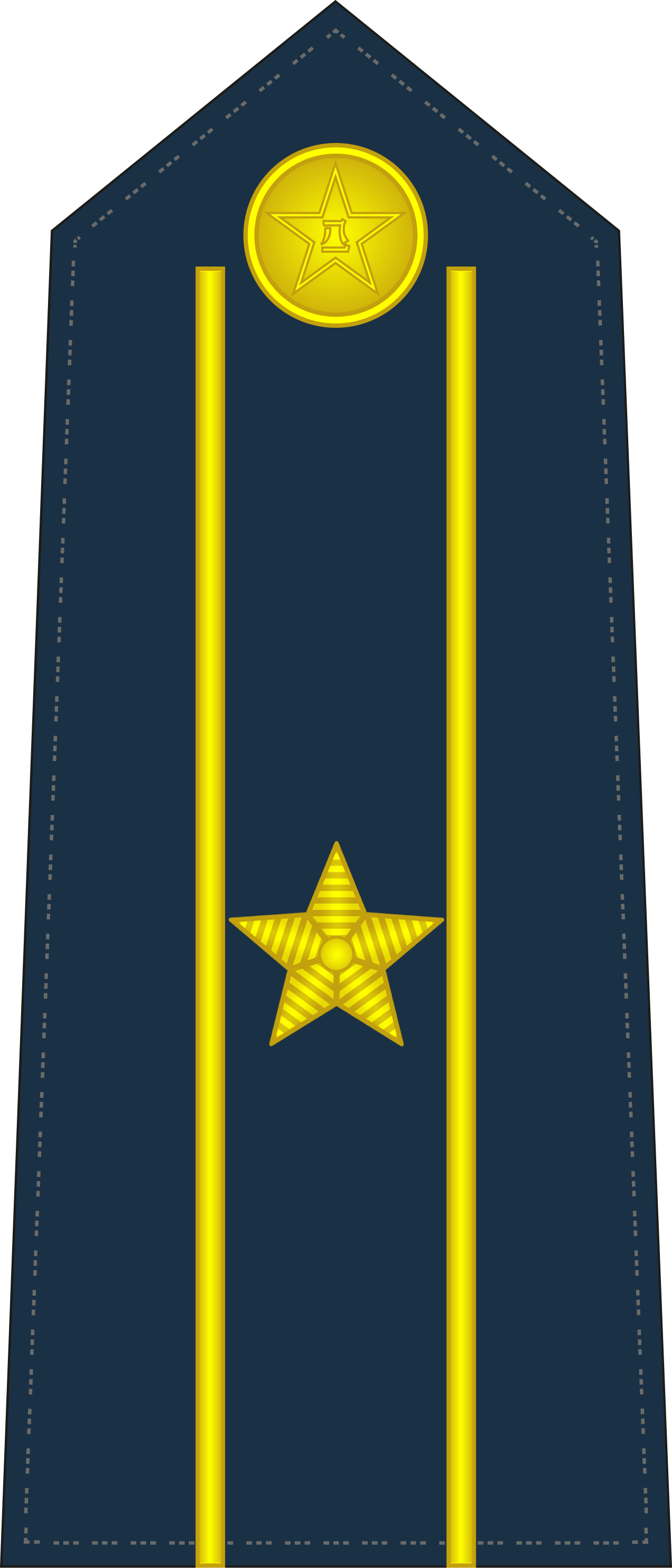
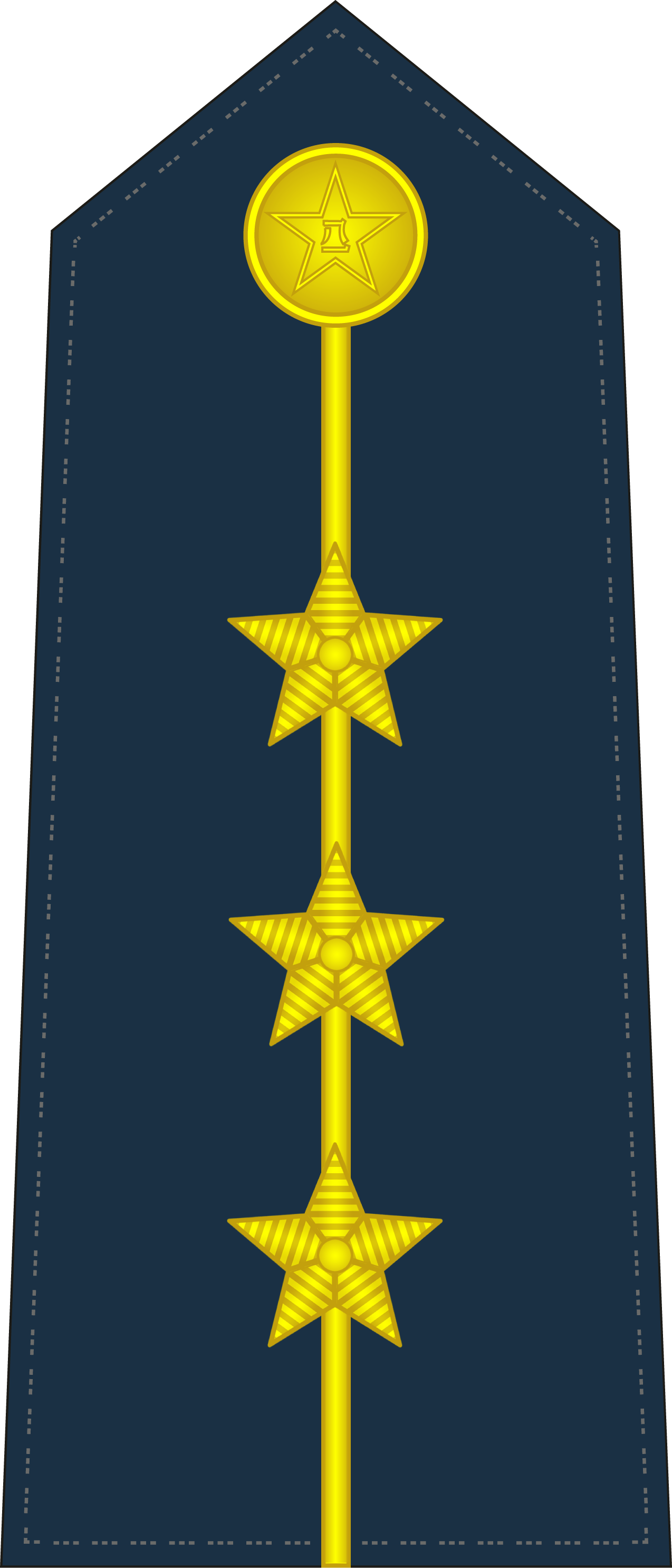
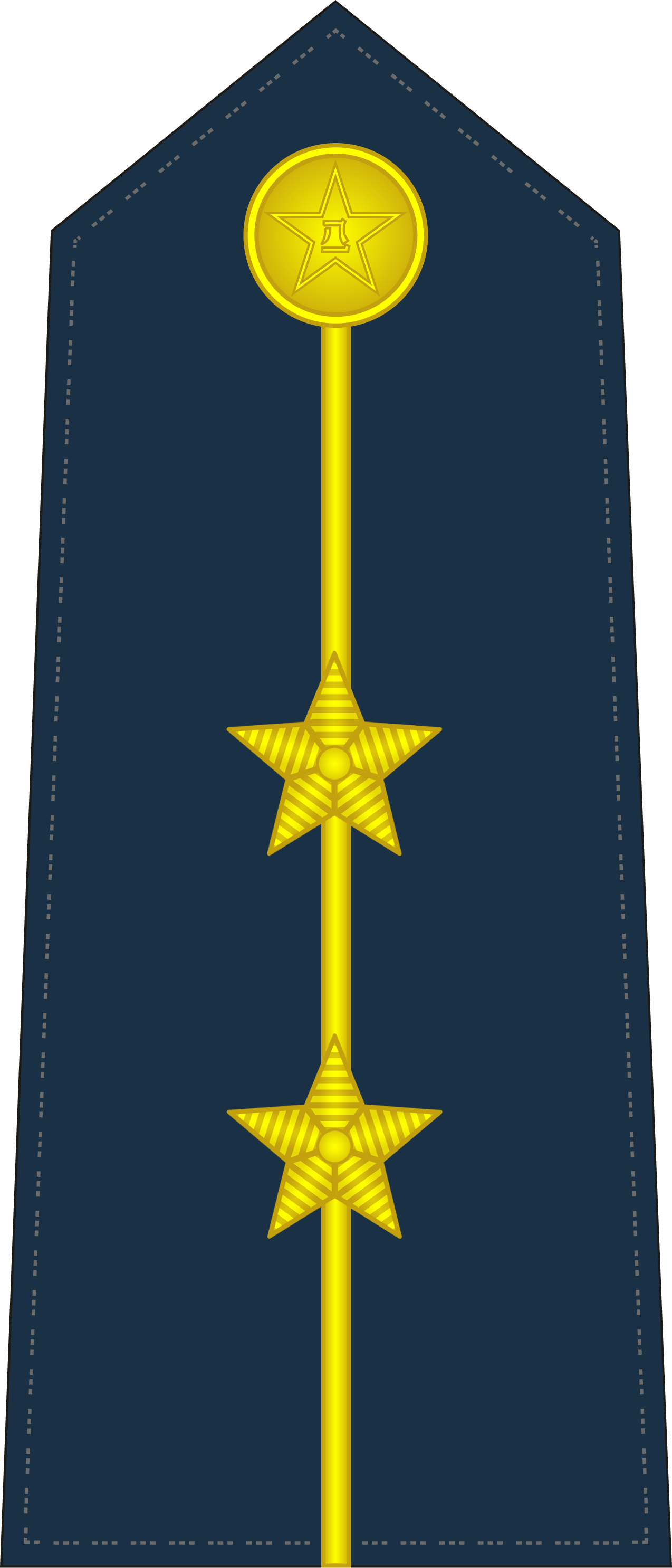
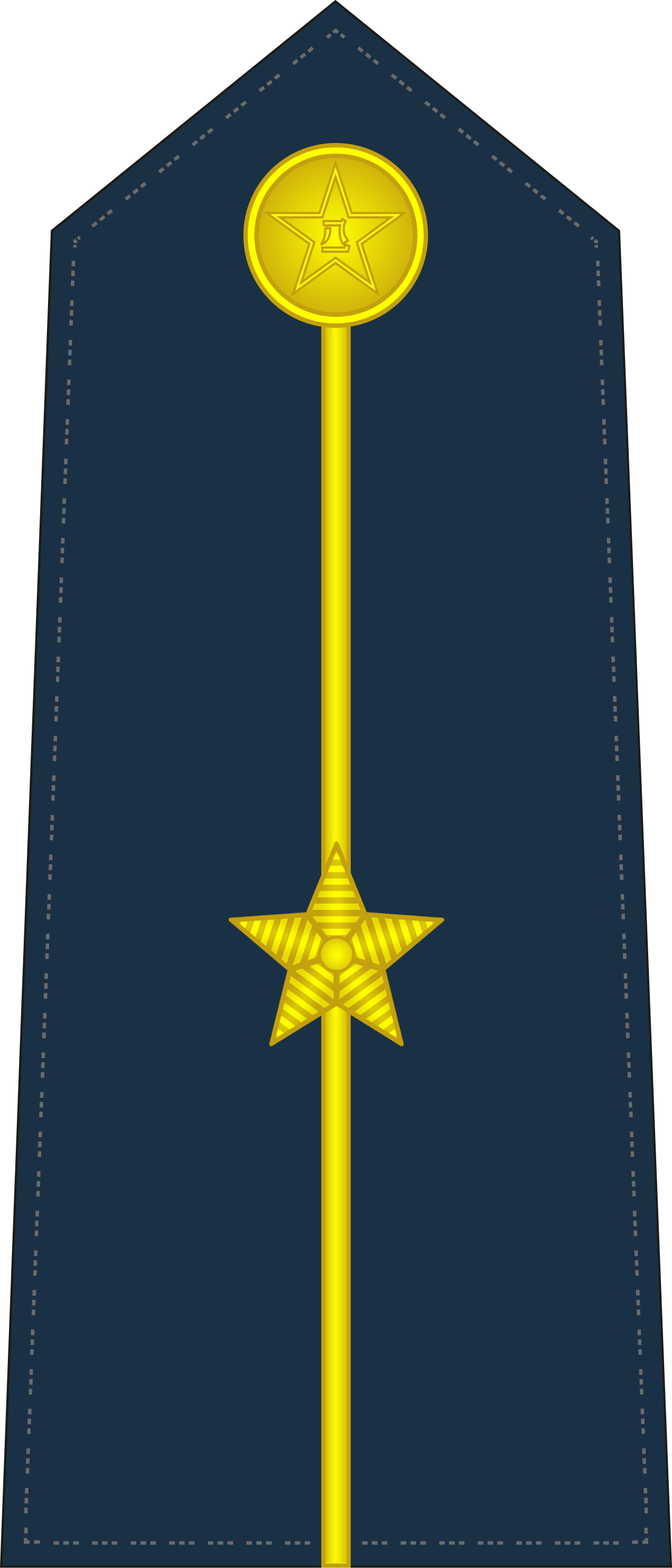
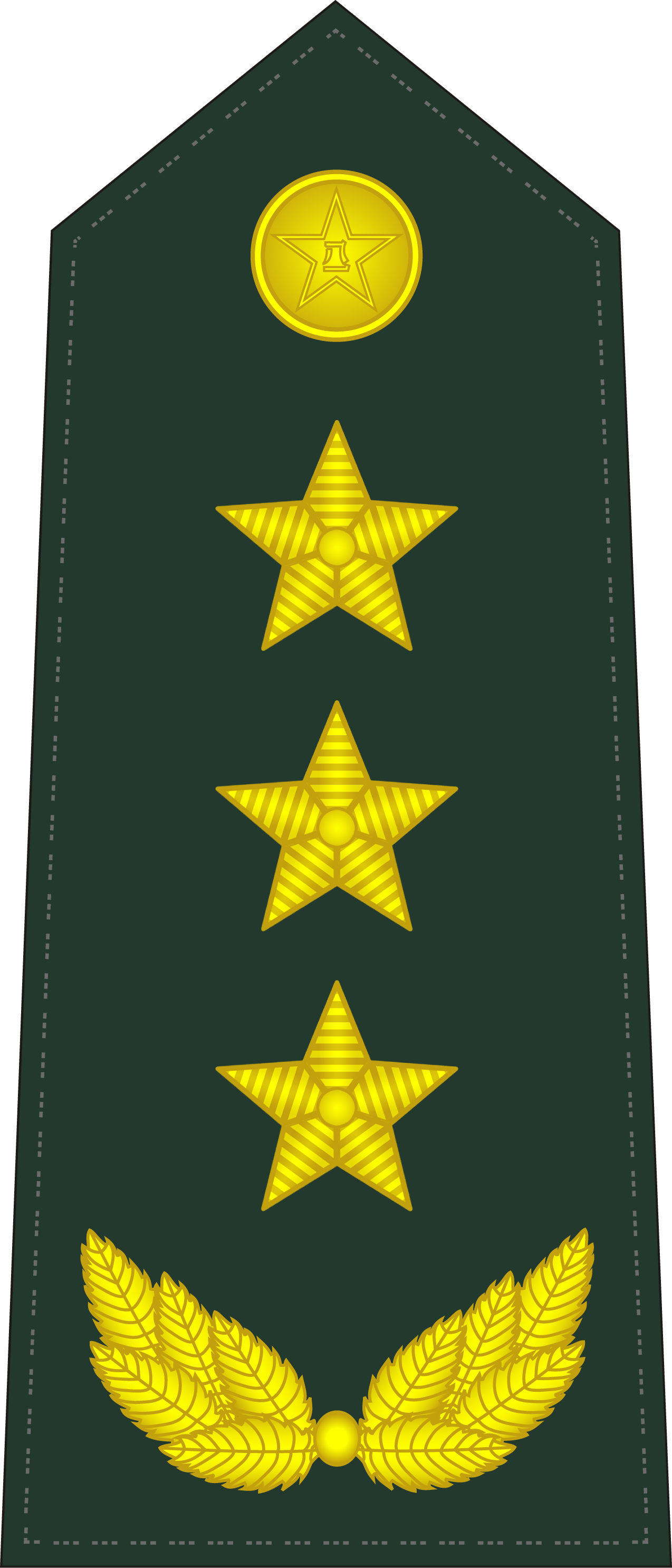
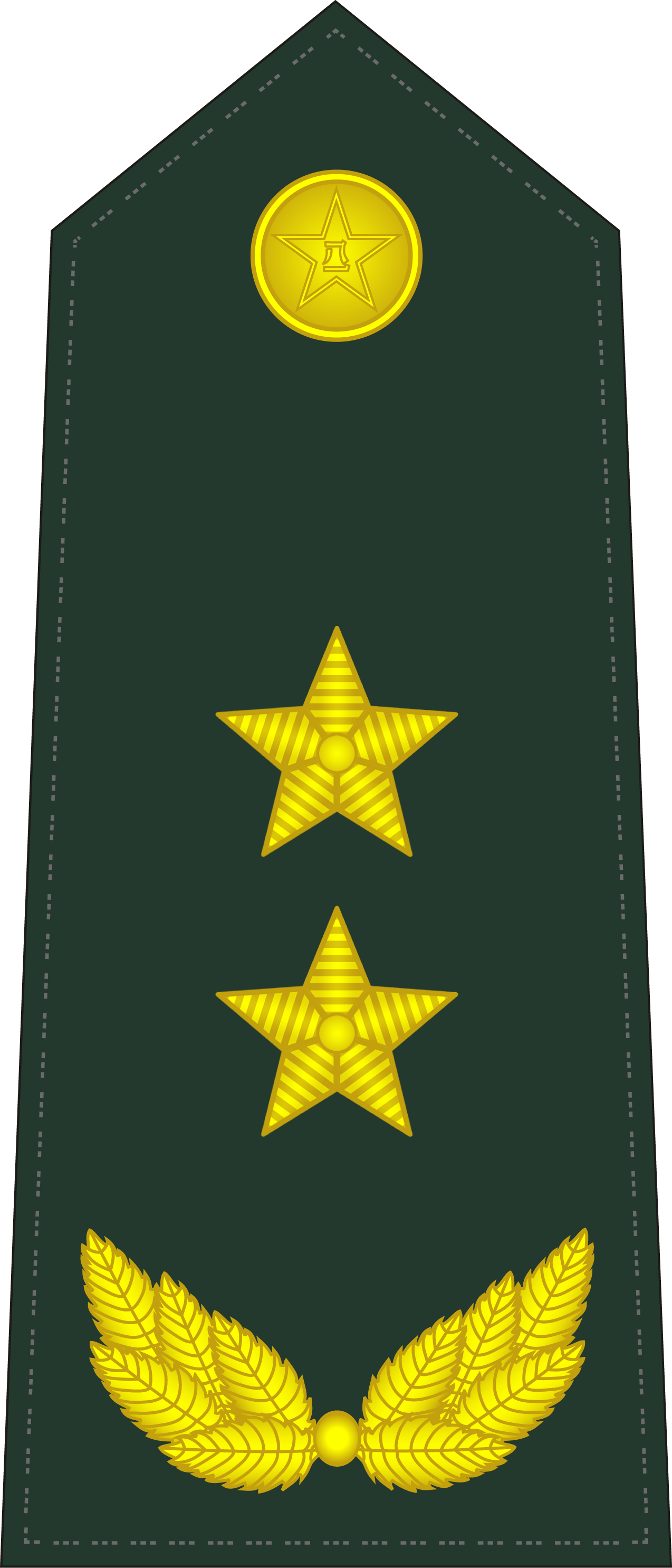
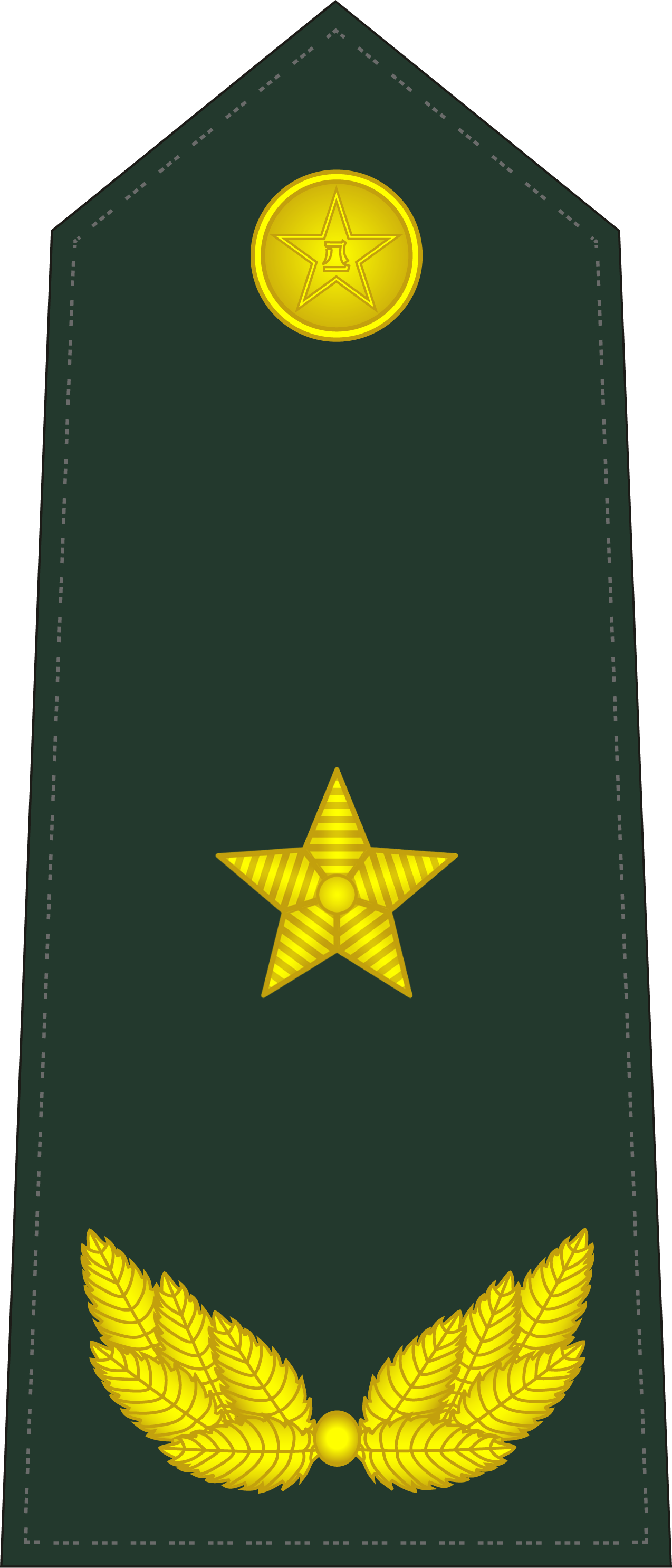
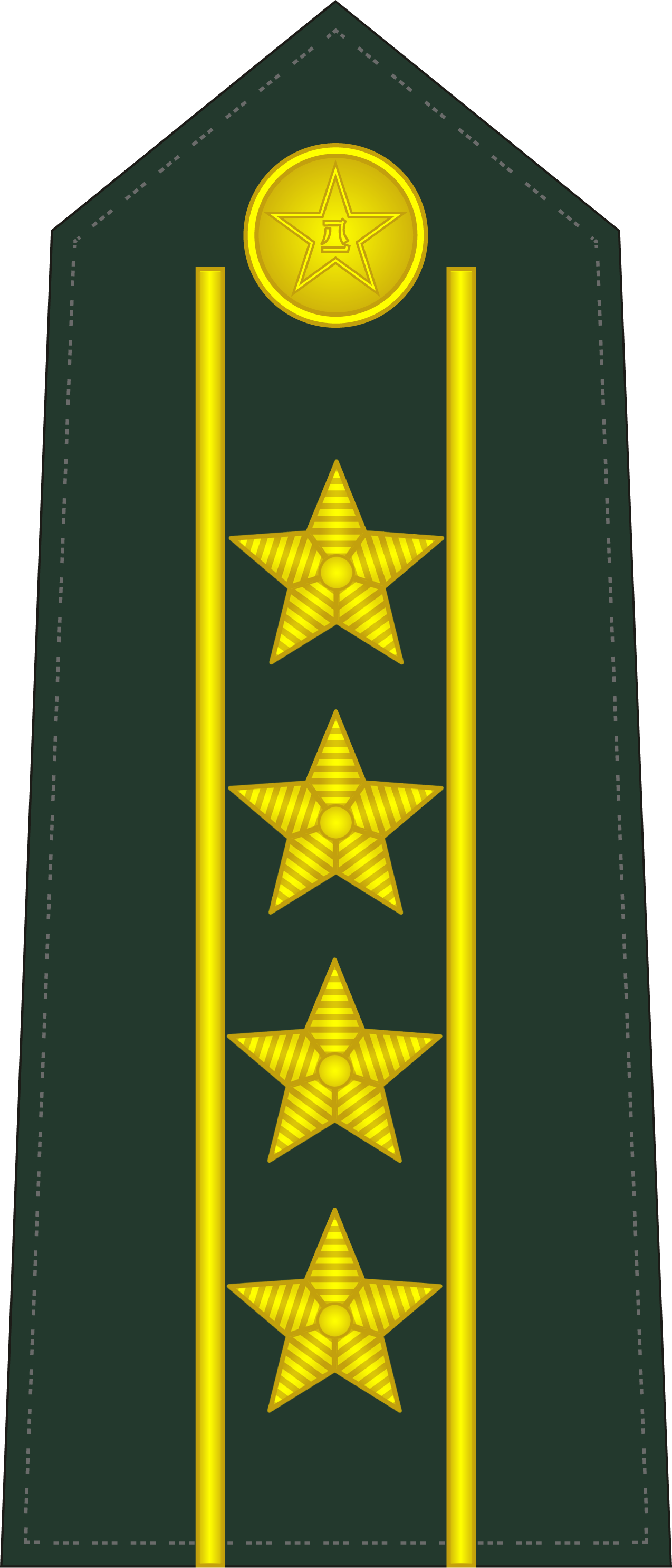
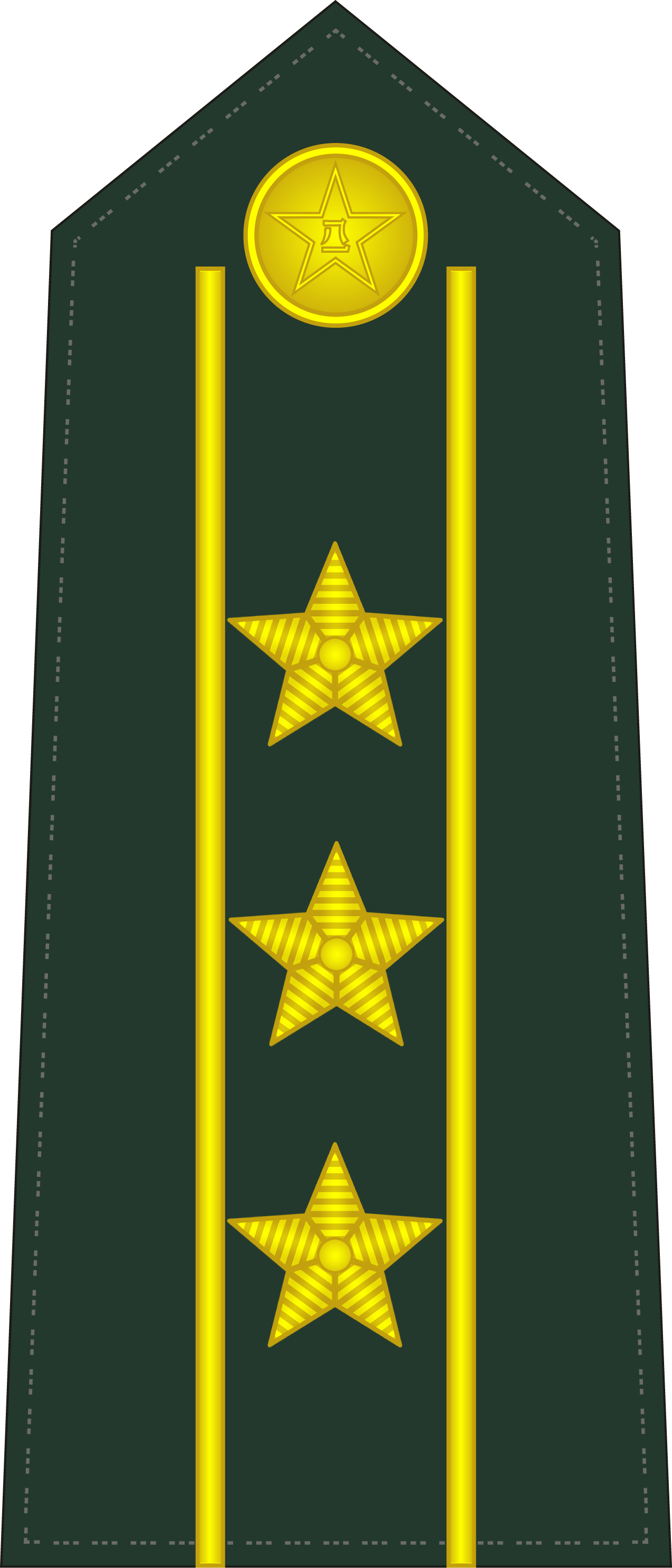
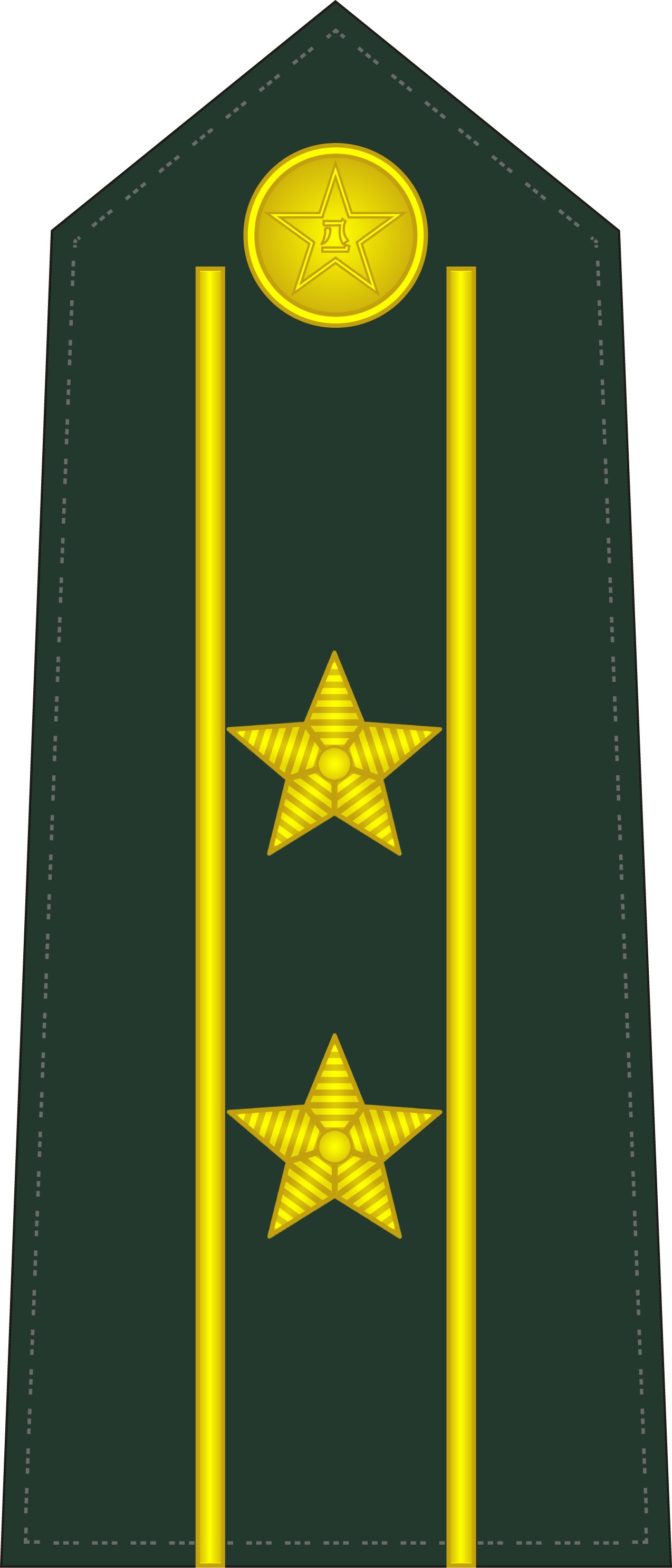
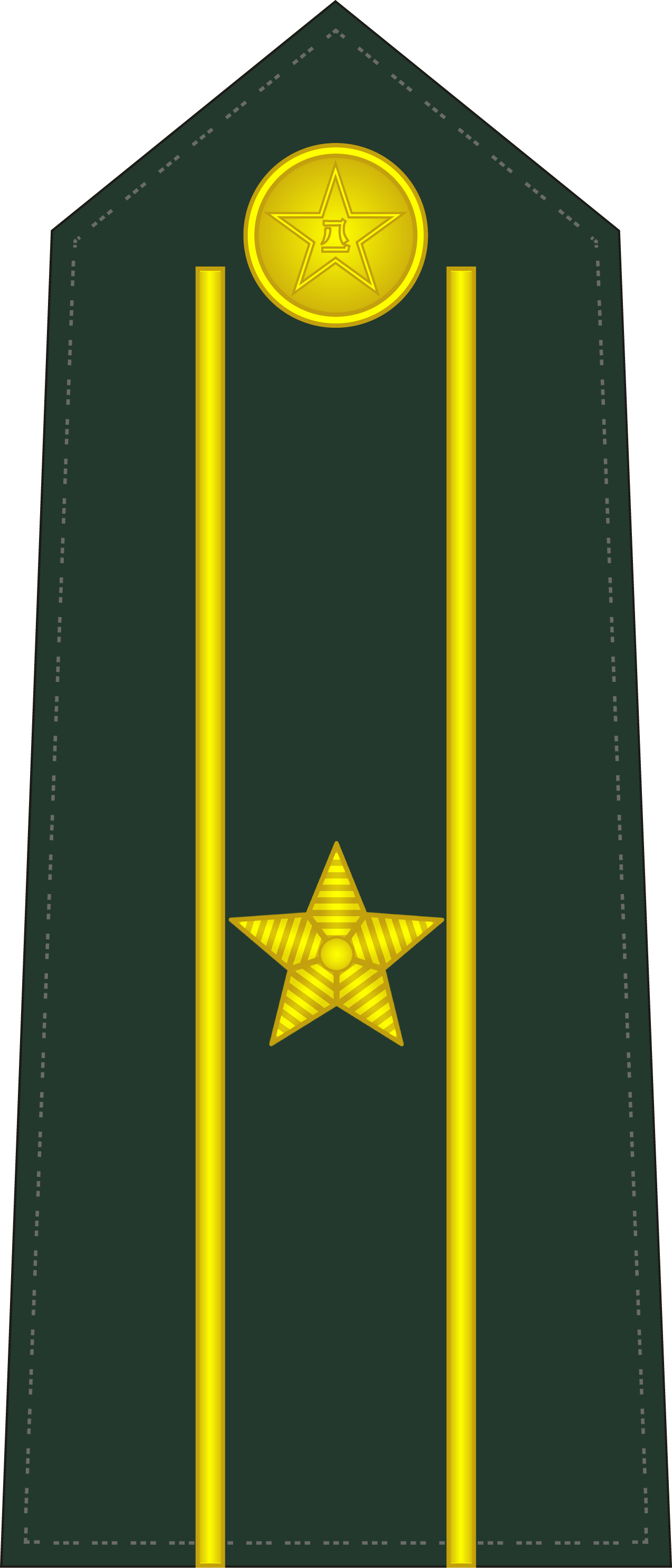
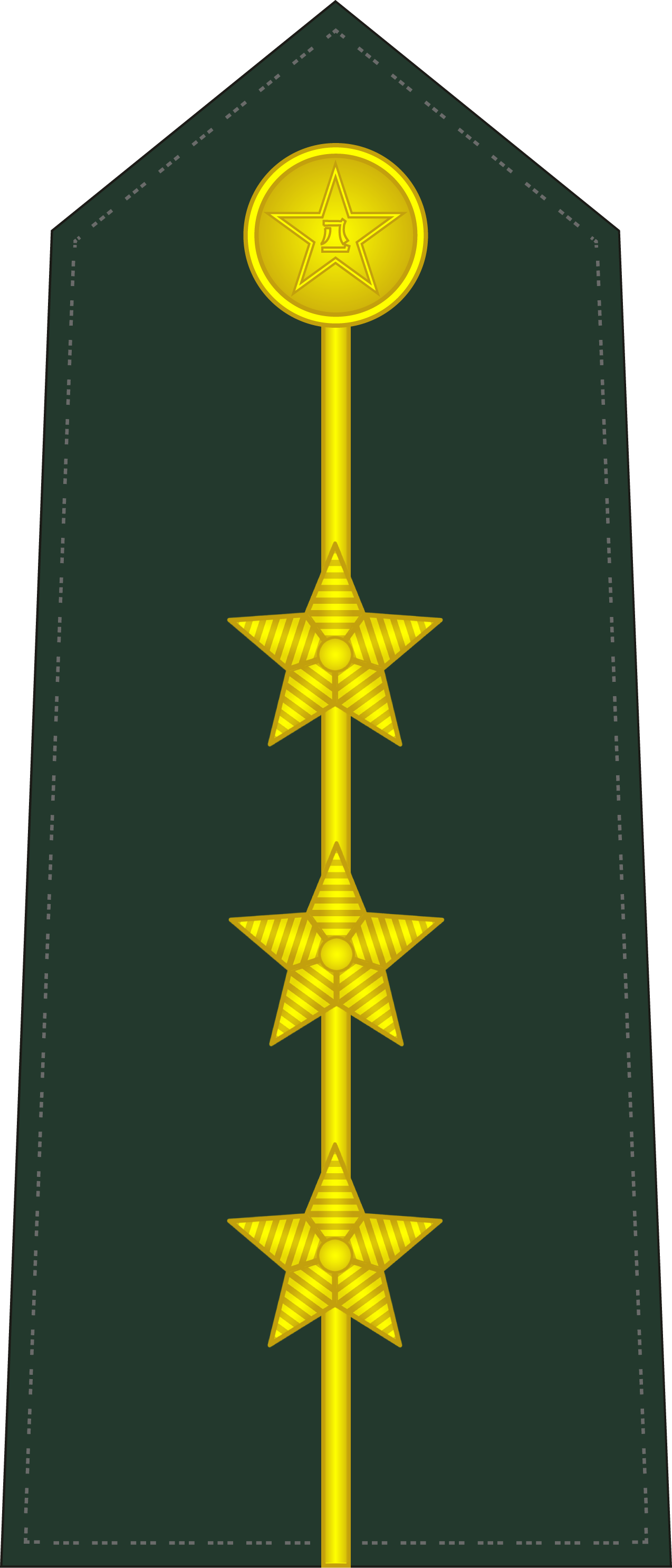
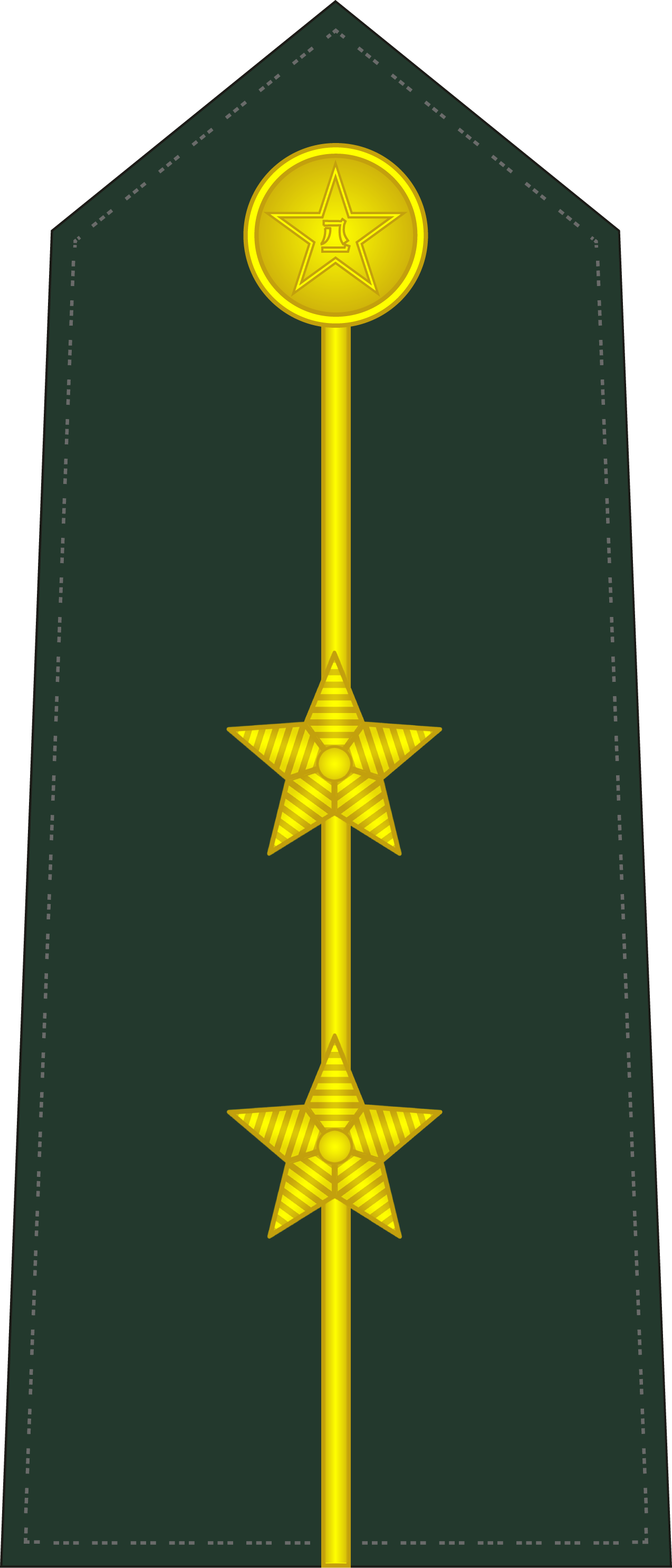
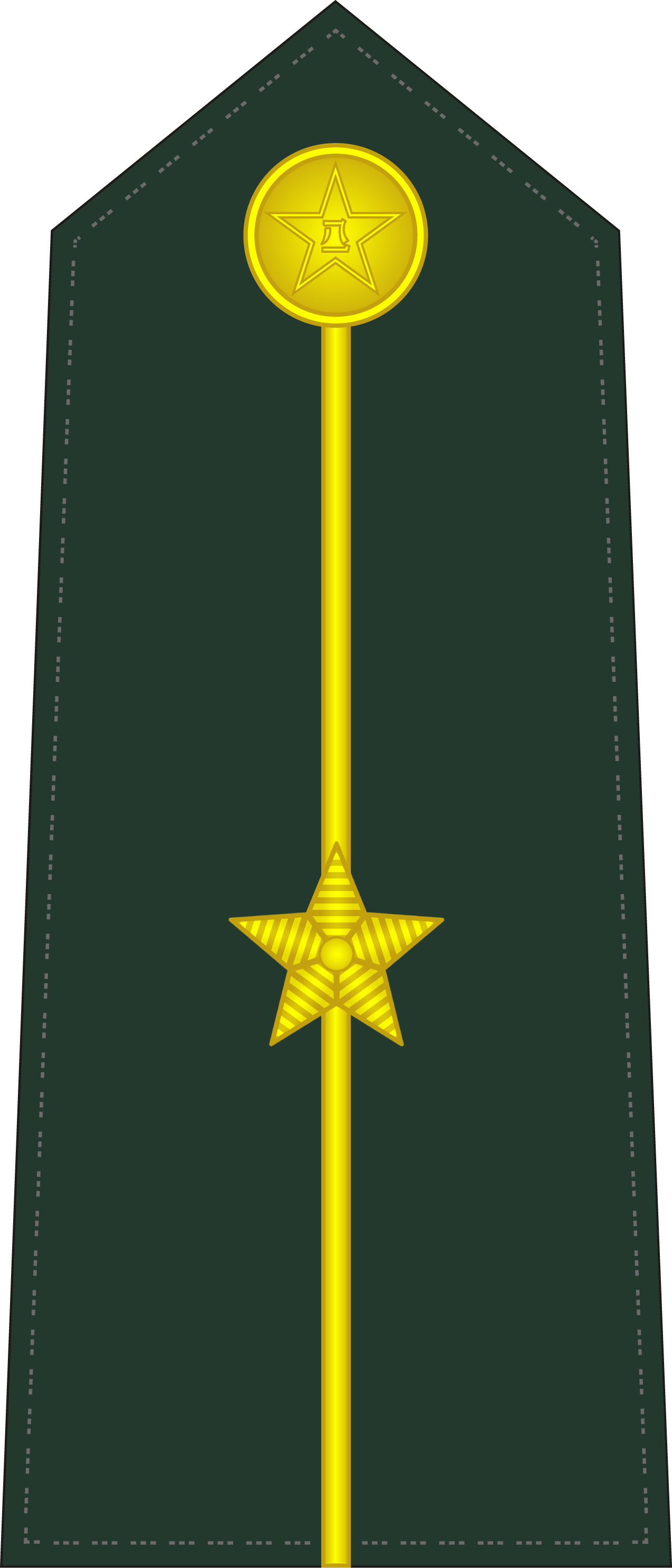
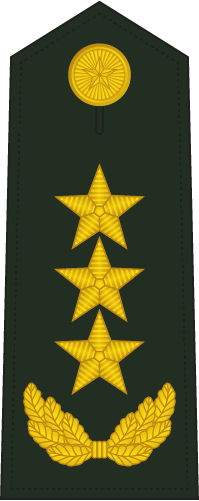
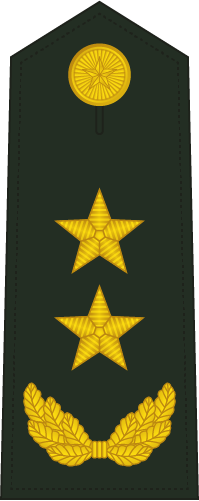
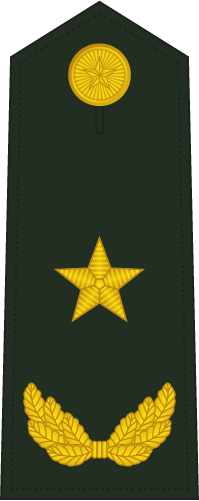
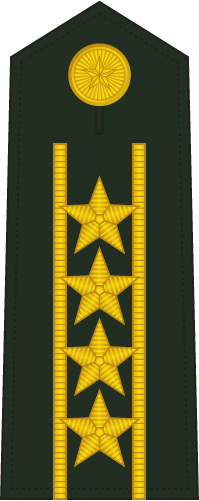
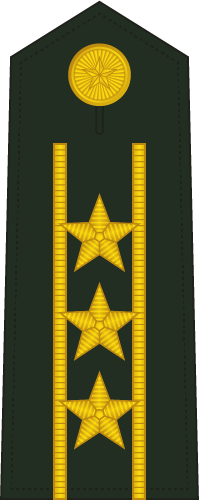
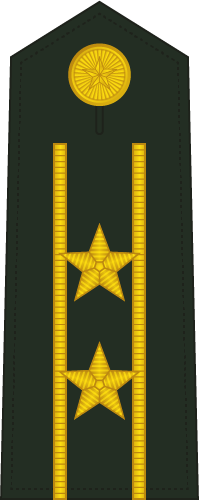
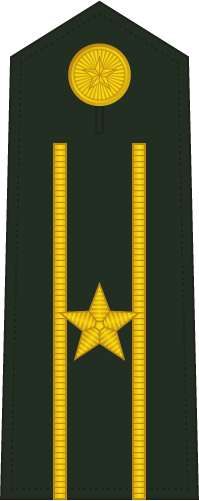
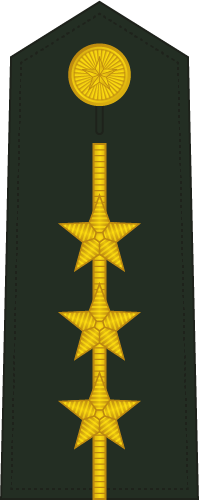
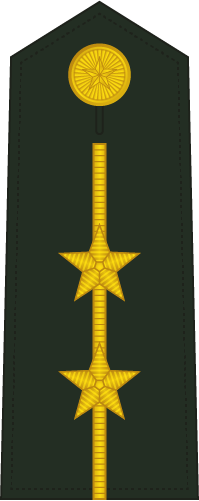
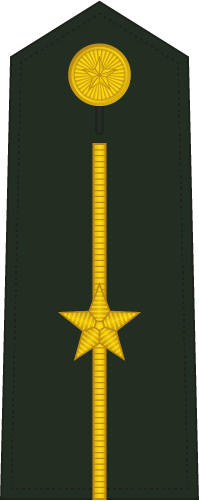
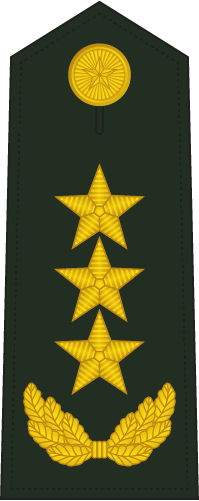
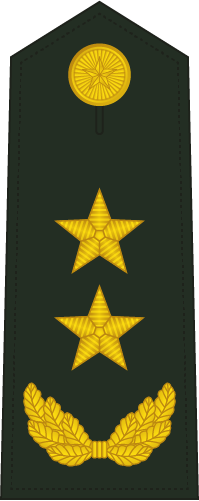
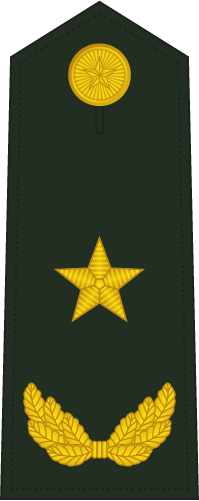
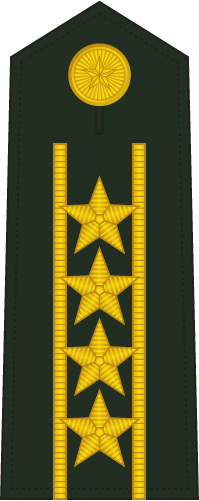
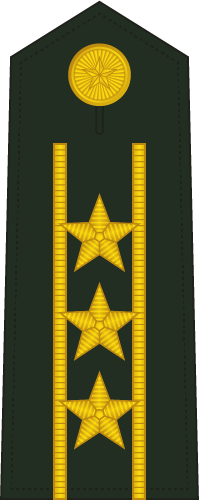
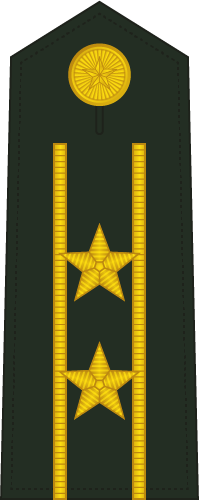
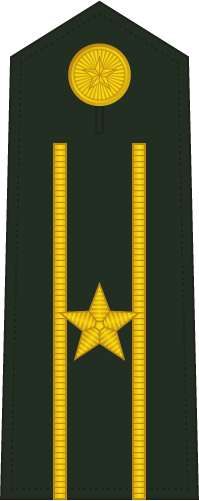
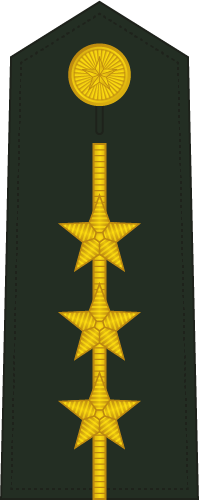
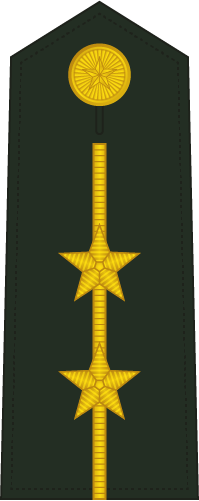
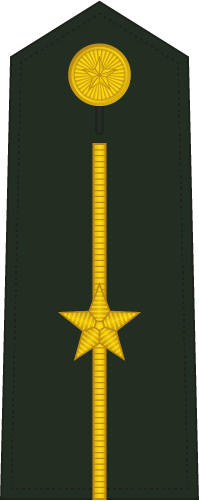
| Rank group | General / flag officers | | | Senior officers | | | | Junior officers |
|---|---|---|---|---|---|---|---|---|---|---|
| PLA Ground Force |
| PLA Ground Force | 上将; Shàngjiāng | 中将; Zhōngjiāng | 少将; Shàojiāng | 大校; Dàxiào | 上校; Shàngxiào | 中校; Zhōngxiào | 少校; Shàoxiào | 上尉; Shàngwèi | 中尉; Zhōngwèi | 少尉; Shàowèi |
| PLA Navy |
| PLA Navy | 海军上将; Hǎijūn shàngjiàng | 海军中将; Hǎijūn zhōngjiàng | 海军少将; Hǎijūn shàojiàng | 海军大校; Hǎijūn dàxiào | 海军上校; Hǎijūn shàngxiào | 海军中校; Hǎijūn zhōngxiào | 海军少校; Hǎijūn shàoxiào | 海军上尉; Hǎijūn shàngwèi | 海军中尉; Hǎijūn zhōngwèi | 海军少尉; Hǎijūn shàowèi |
| PLA Air Force |
| PLA Air Force | 空军上将; Kōngjūn shàngjiàng | 空军中将; Kōngjūn zhōngjiàng | 空军少将; Kōngjūn shàojiàng | 空军大校; Kōngjūn dàxiào | 空军上校; Kōngjūn shàngxiào | 空军中校; Kōngjūn zhōngxiào | 空军少校; Kōngjūn shàoxiào | 空军上尉; Kōngjūn shàngwèi | 空军中尉; Kōngjūn zhōngwèi | 空军少尉; Kōngjūn shàowèi |
| People's Armed Police |
| People's Armed Police | 武警上将; Wǔjǐng Shàngjiàng | 武警中将; Wǔjǐng Zhōngjiàng | 武警少将; Wǔjǐng Shàojiàng | 武警大校; Wǔjǐng Dàxiào | 武警上校; Wǔjǐng Shàngxiào | 武警中校; Wǔjǐng Zhōngxiào | 武警少校; Wǔjǐng Shàoxiào | 武警上尉; Wǔjǐng Shàngwèi | 武警中尉; Wǔjǐng Zhōngwèi | 武警少尉; Wǔjǐng Shàowèi |
| PLA Aerospace Force |
| PLA Aerospace Force | 上将; Shàngjiàng | 中将; Zhōngjiàng | 少将; Shàojiàng | 大校; Dàxiào | 上校; Shàngxiào | 中校; Zhōngxiào | 少校; Shàoxiào | 上尉; Shàngwèi | 中尉; Zhōngwèi | 少尉; Shàowèi |
| PLA Cyberspace Force |
| PLA Cyberspace Force | 上将; Shàngjiàng | 中将; Zhōngjiàng | 少将; Shàojiàng | 大校; Dàxiào | 上校; Shàngxiào | 中校; Zhōngxiào | 少校; Shàoxiào | 上尉; Shàngwèi | 中尉; Zhōngwèi | 少尉; Shàowèi |
| Rank group | General / flag officers | | | Senior officers | | | | Junior officers |

== Other ranks ==
The rank insignia of non-commissioned officers and enlisted personnel.

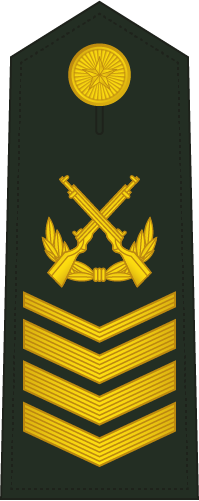
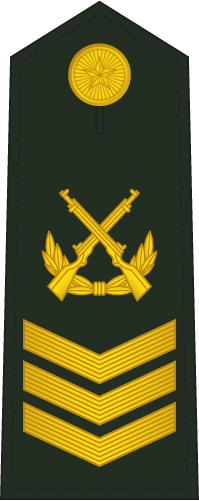
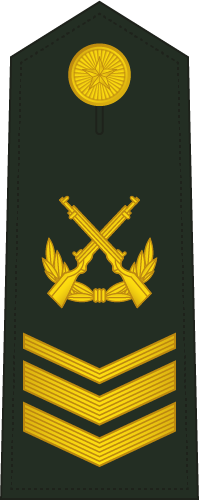
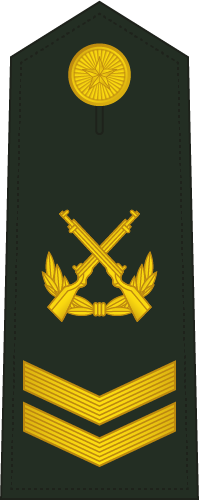
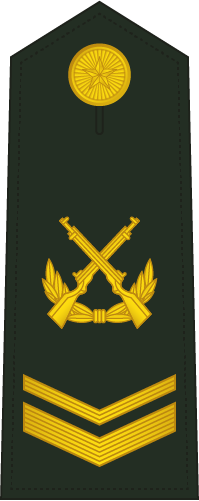
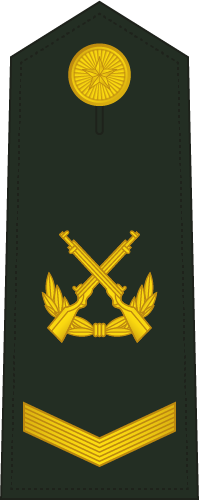
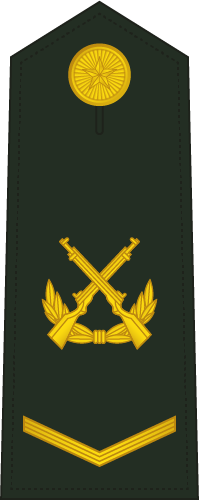
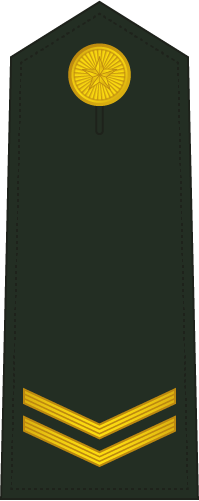
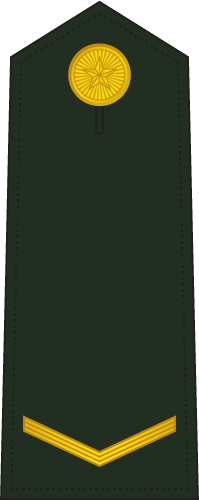
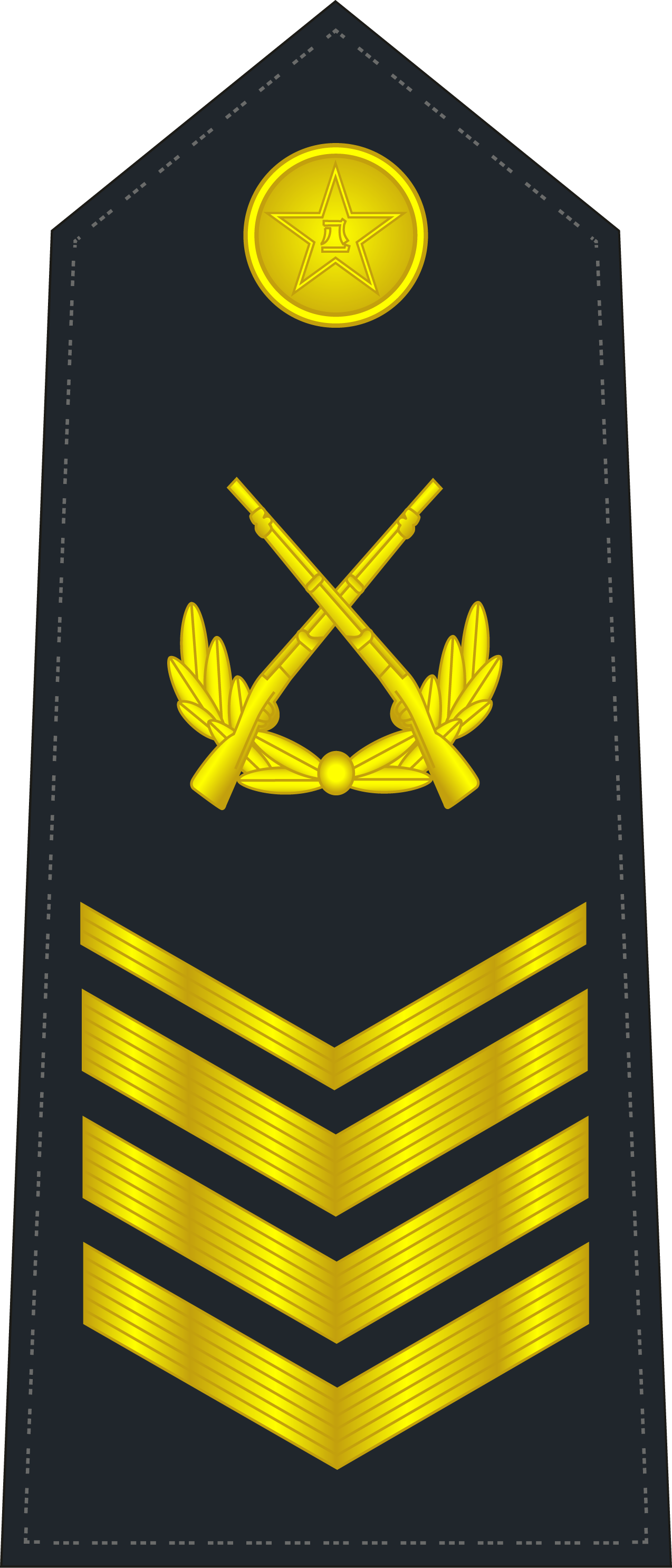
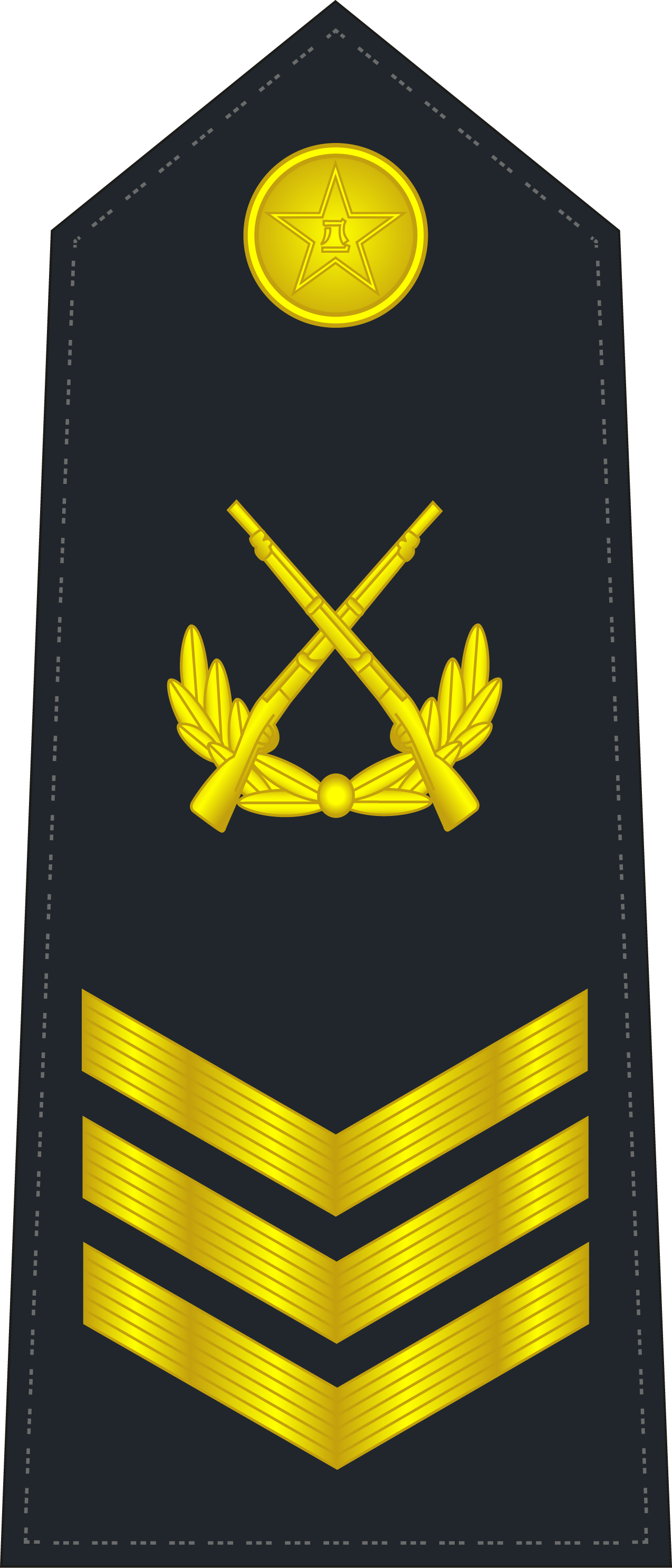
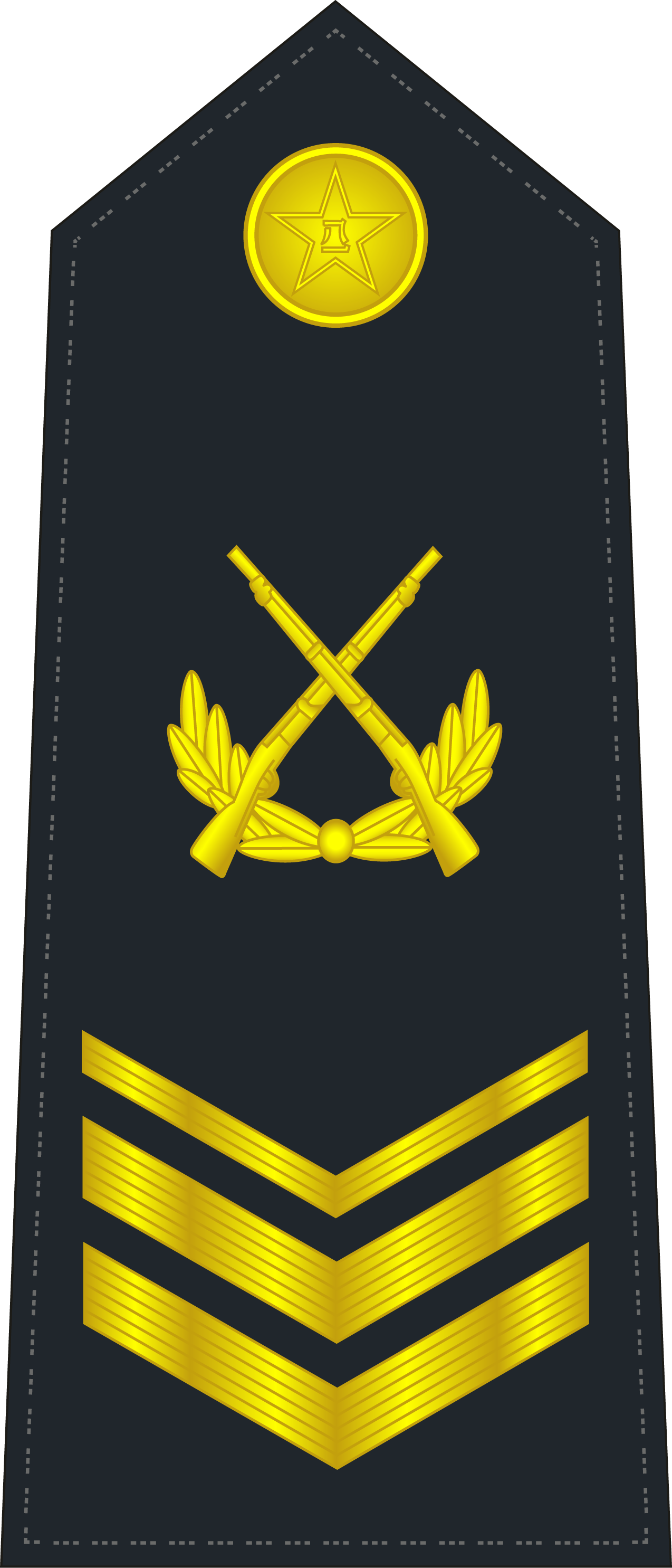
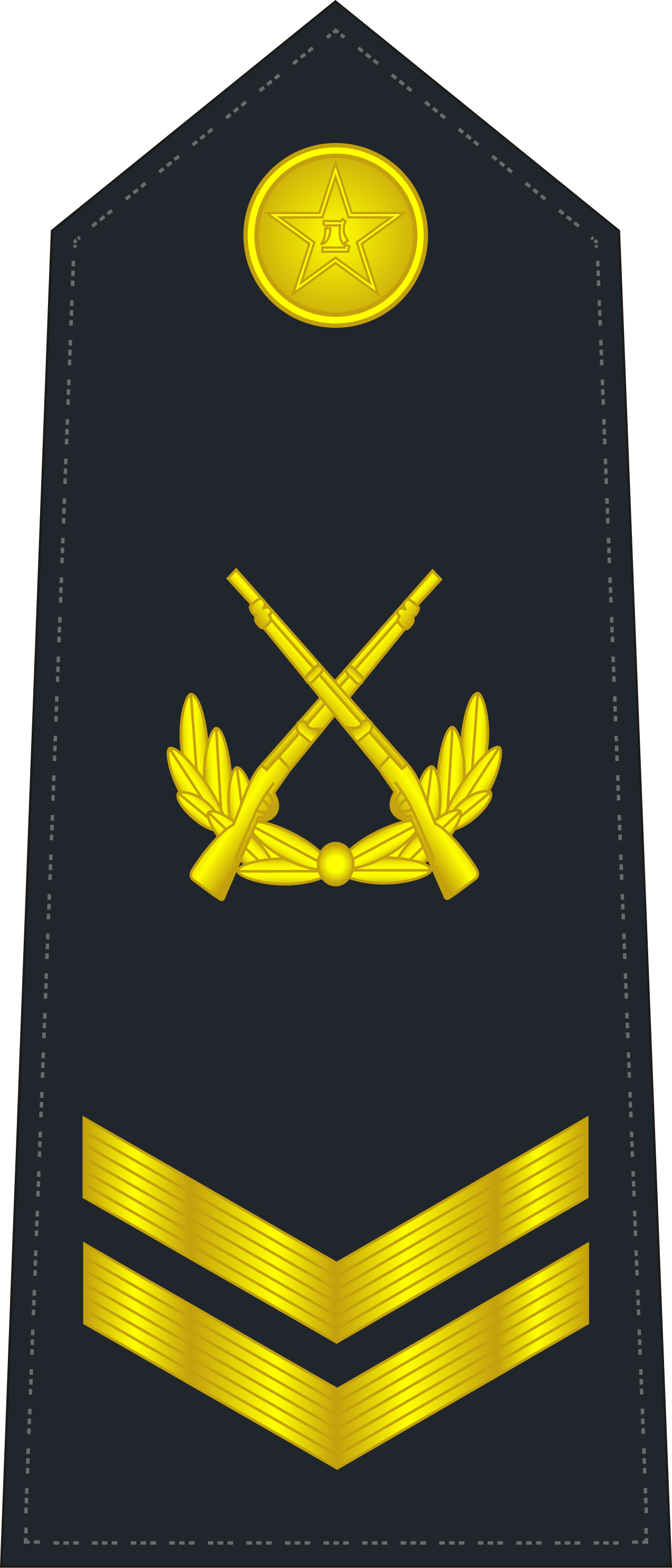
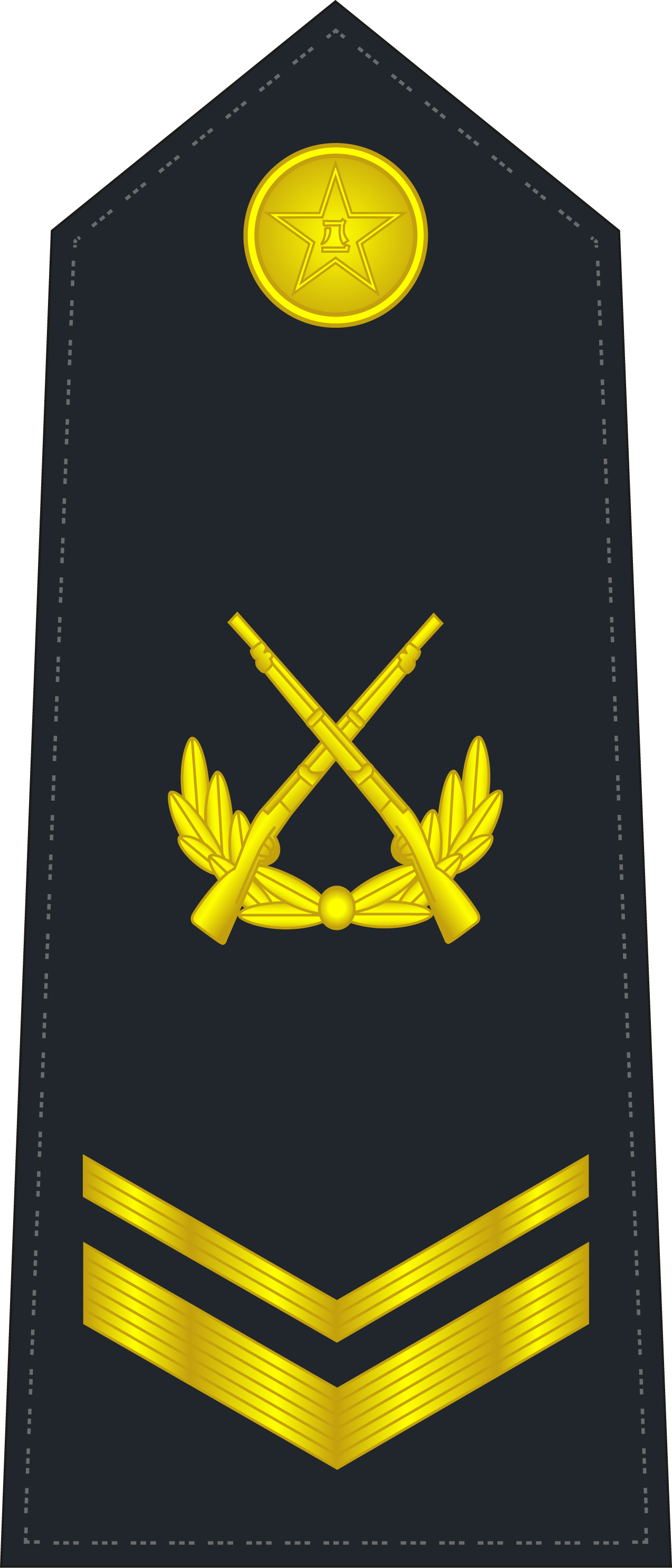
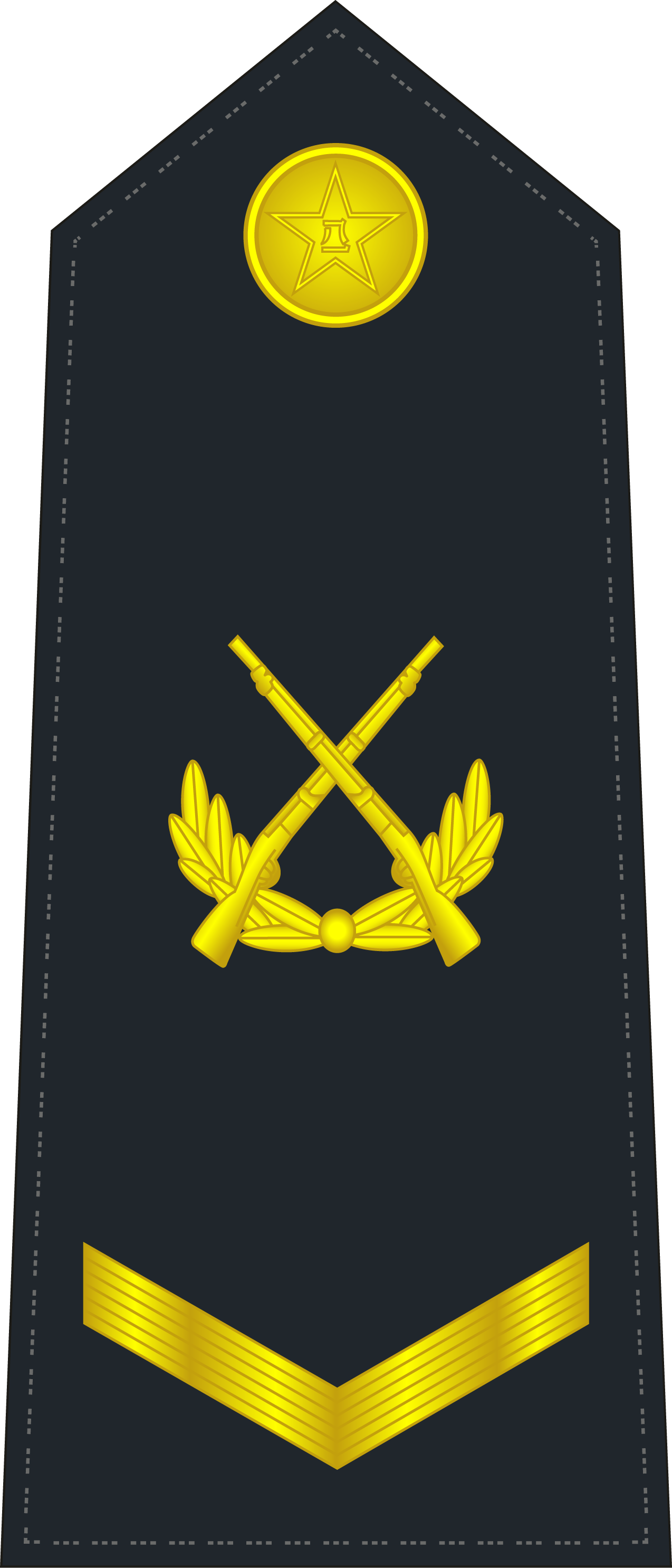
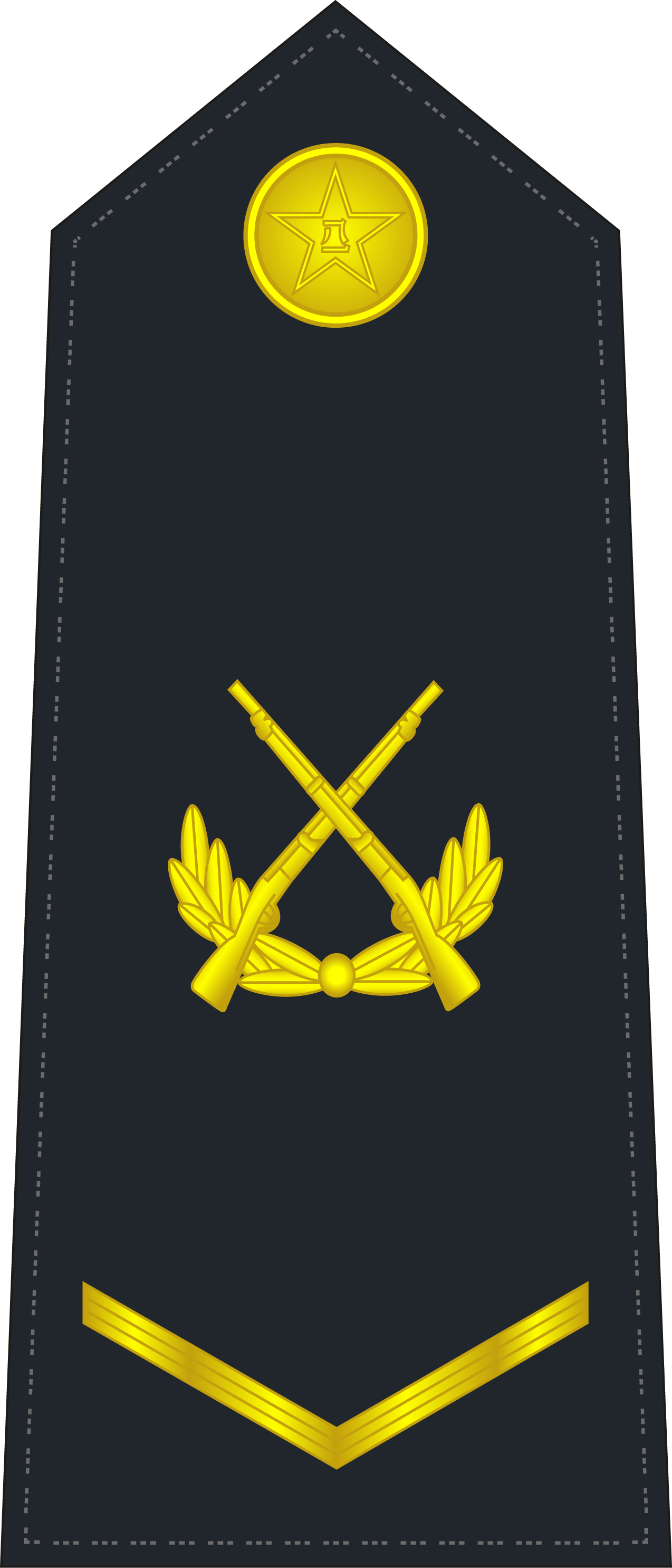
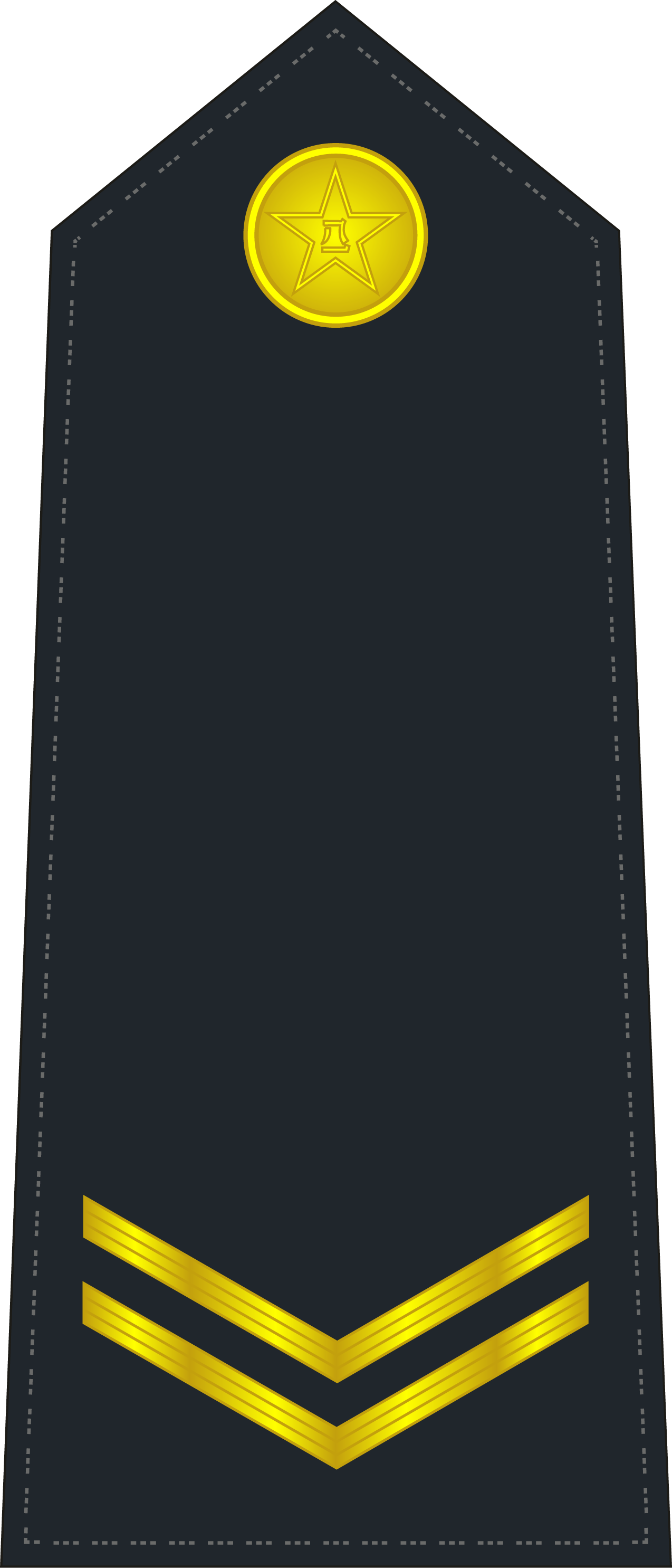
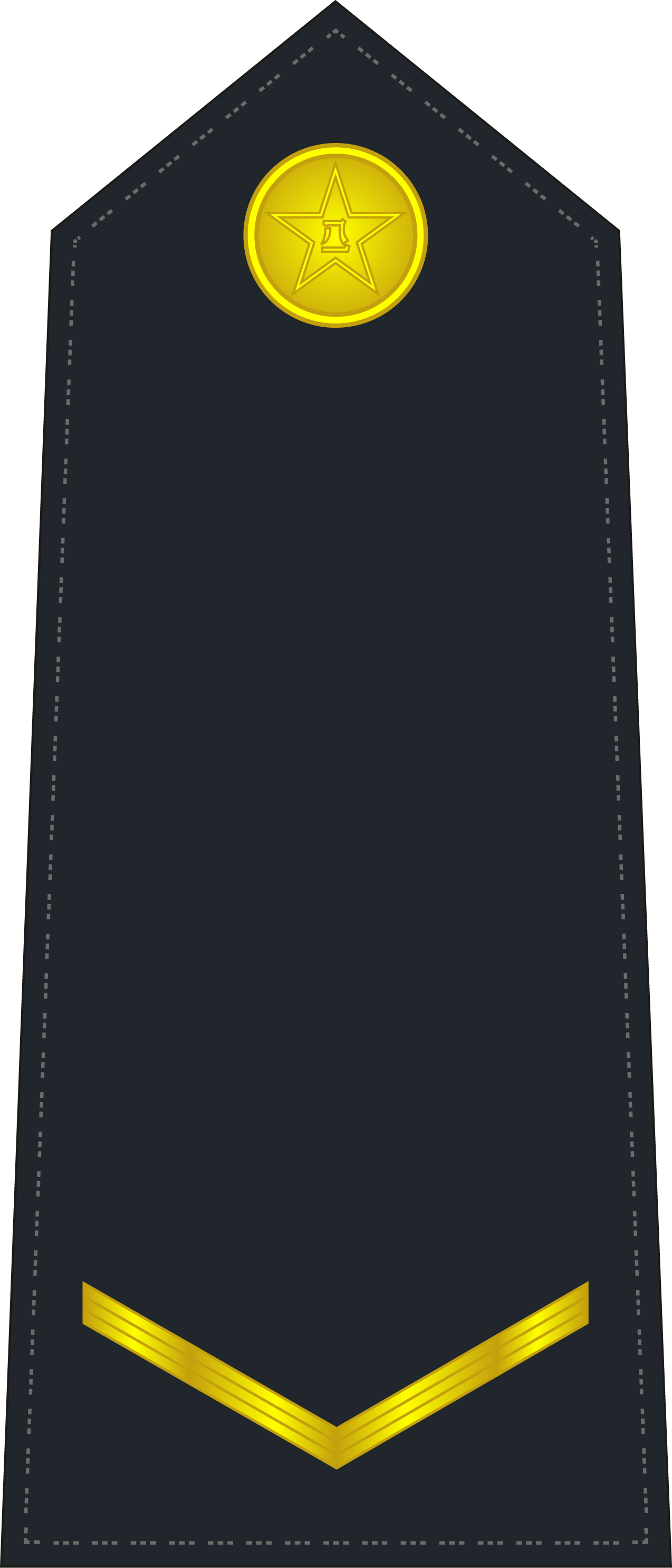
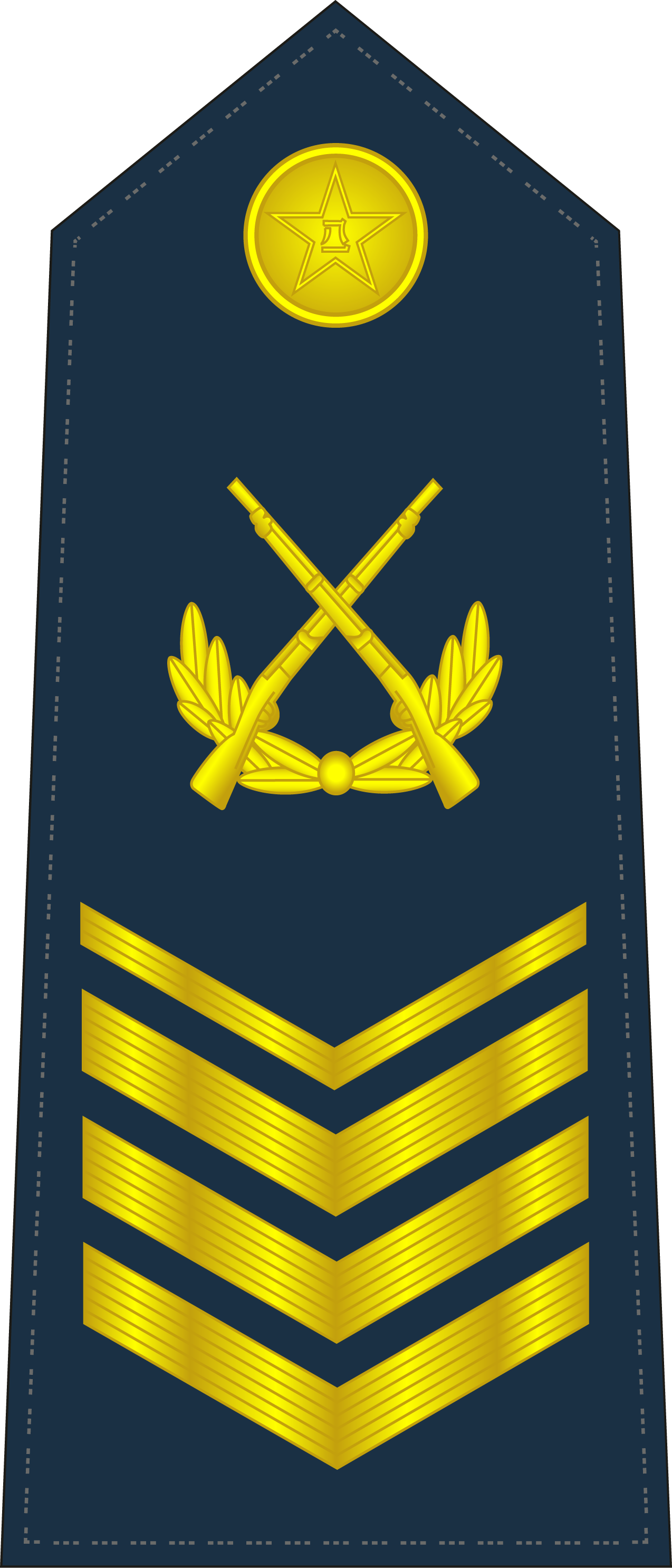
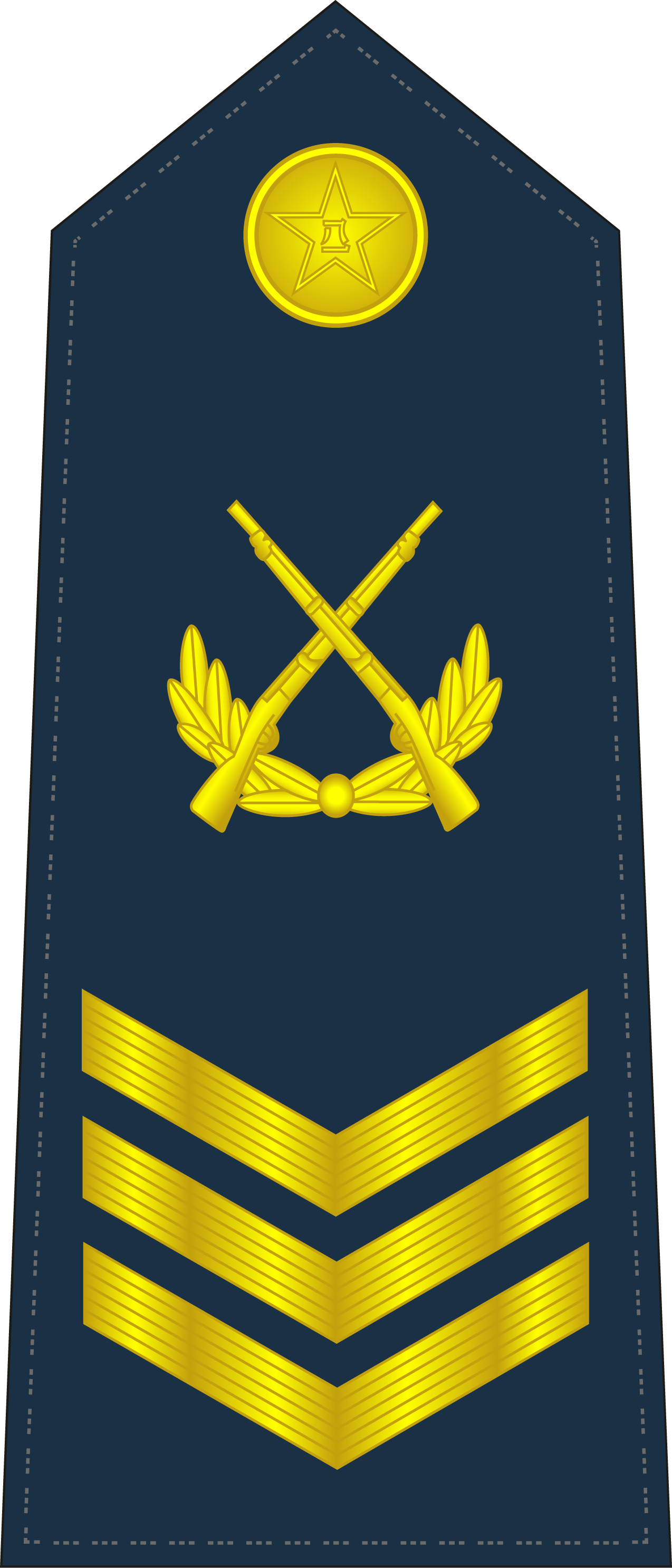
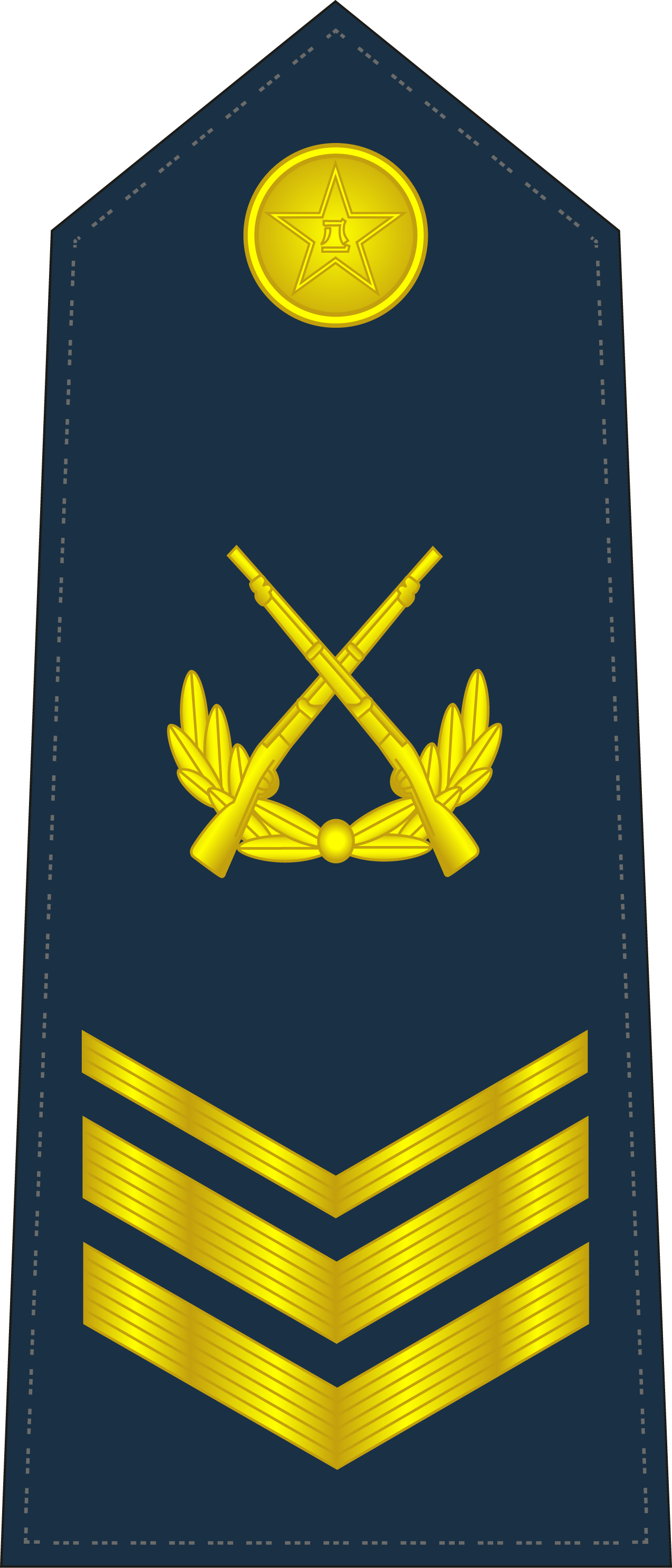
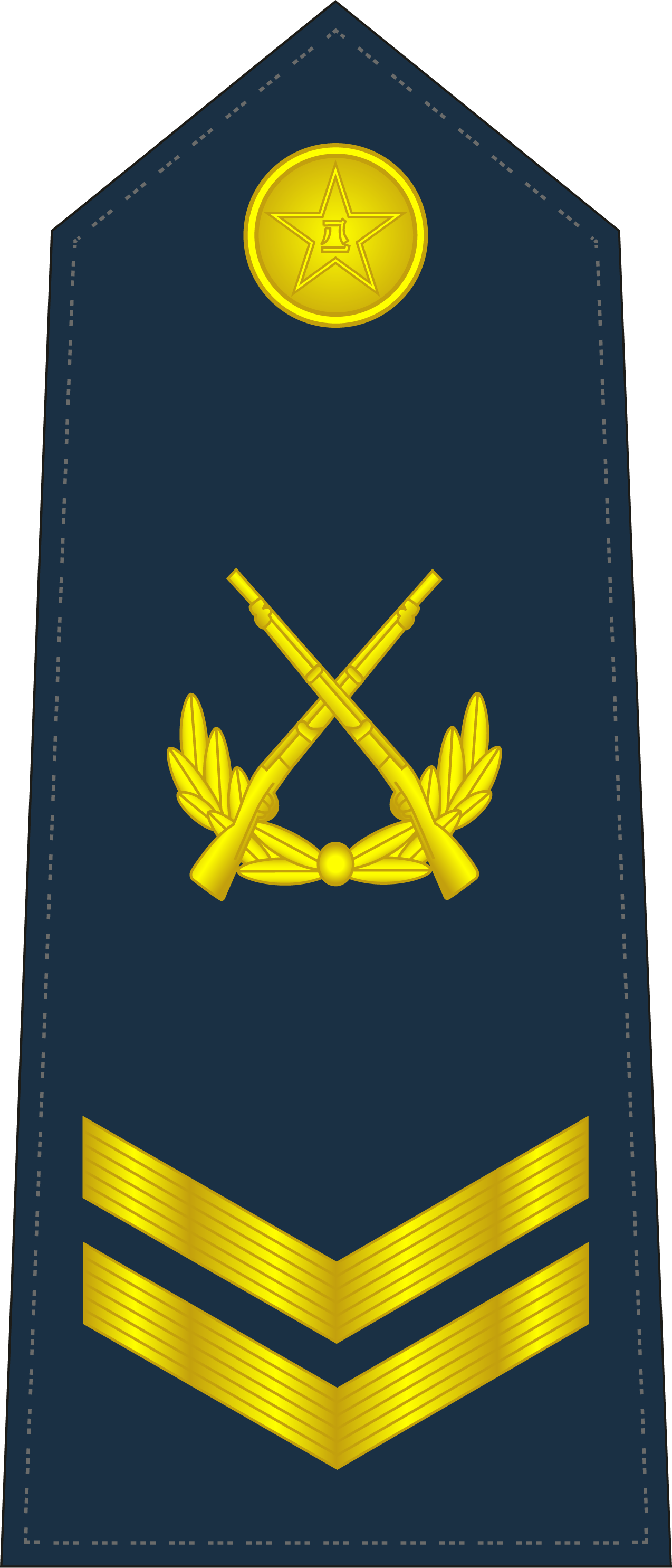
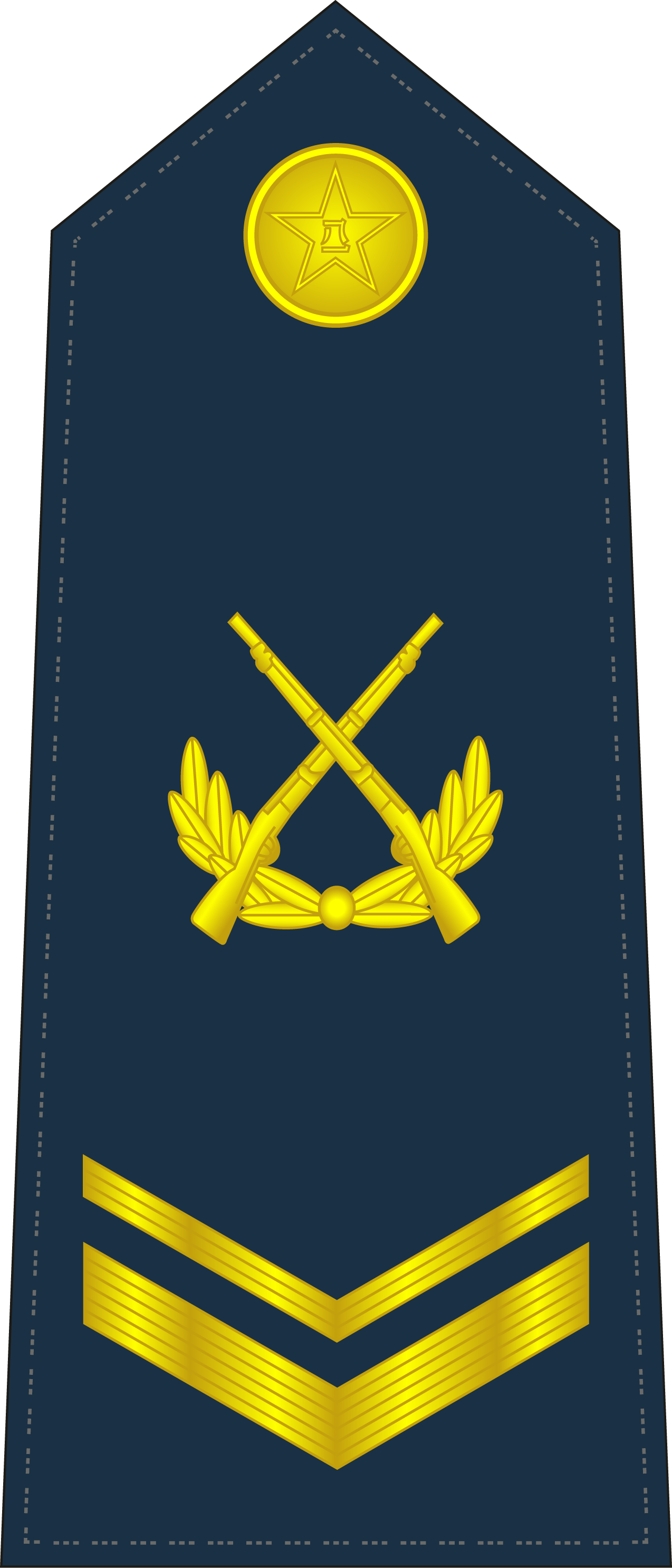
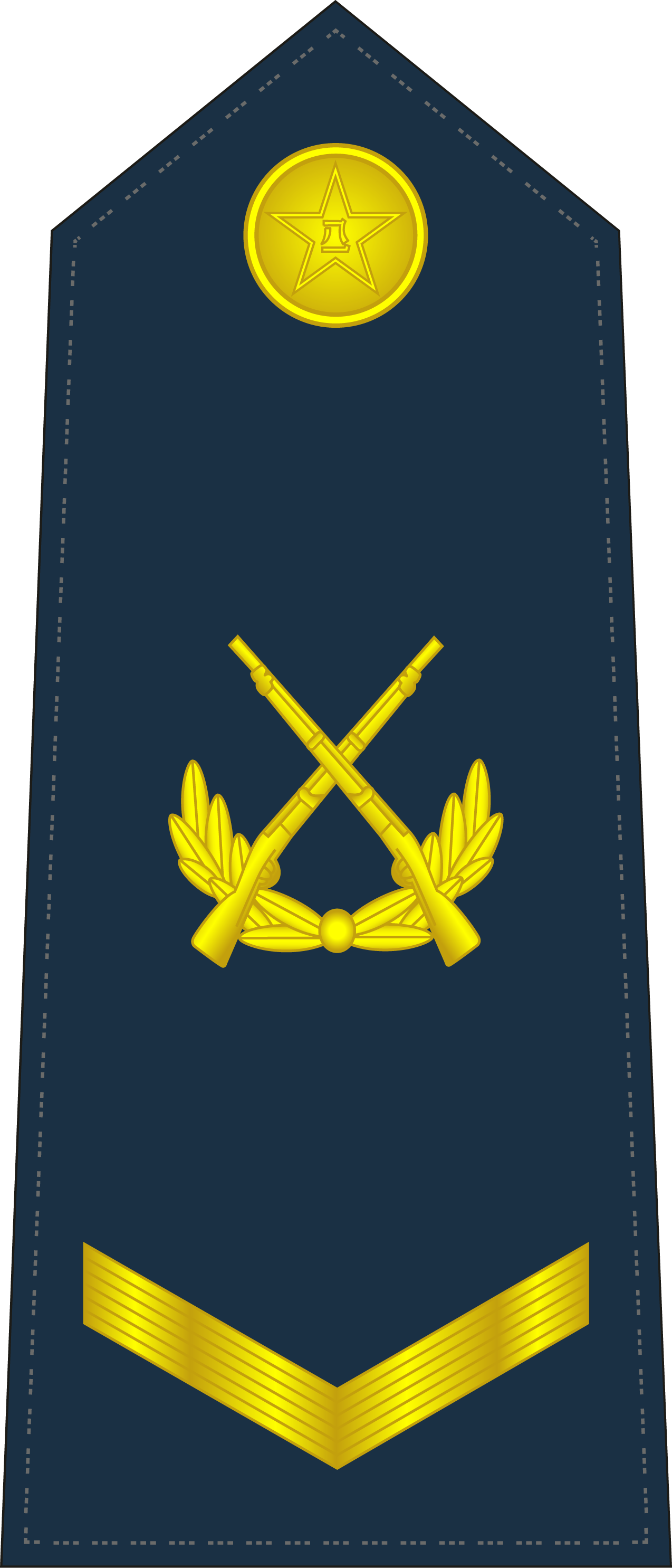
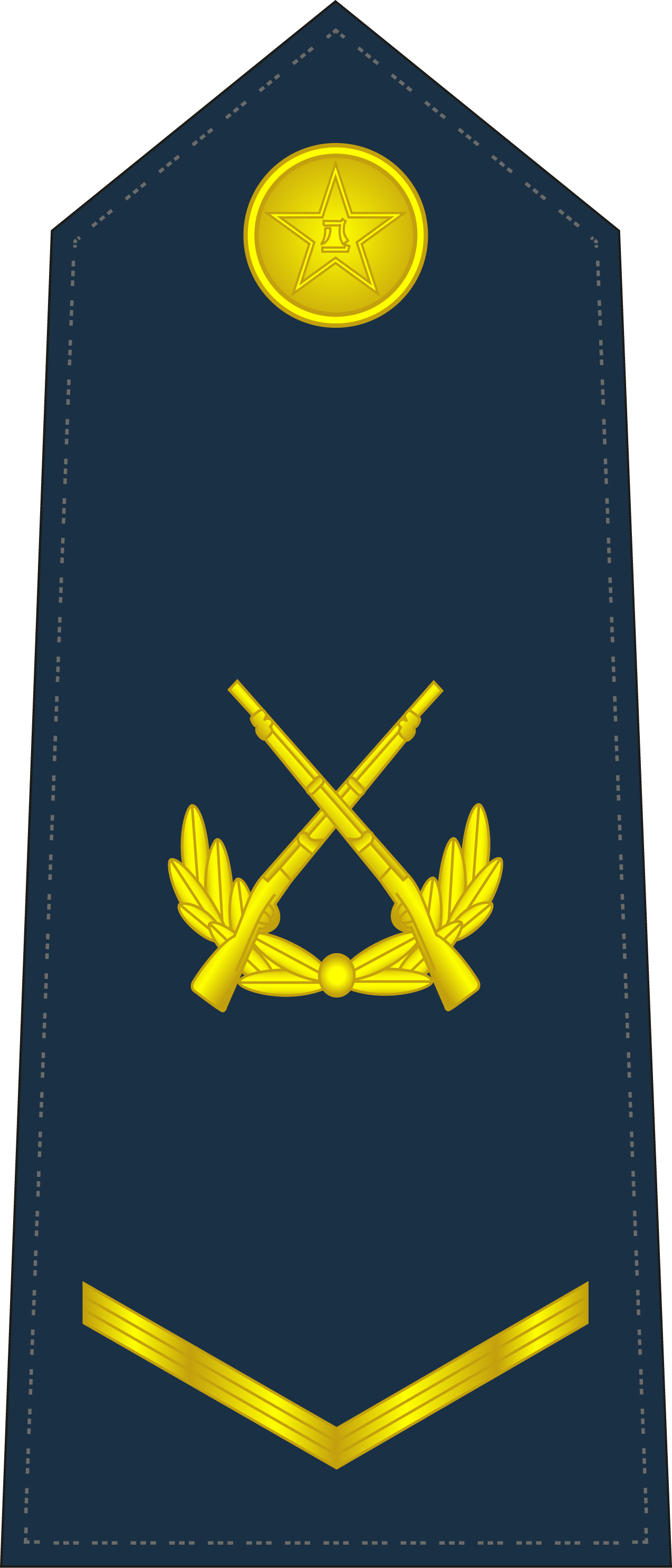
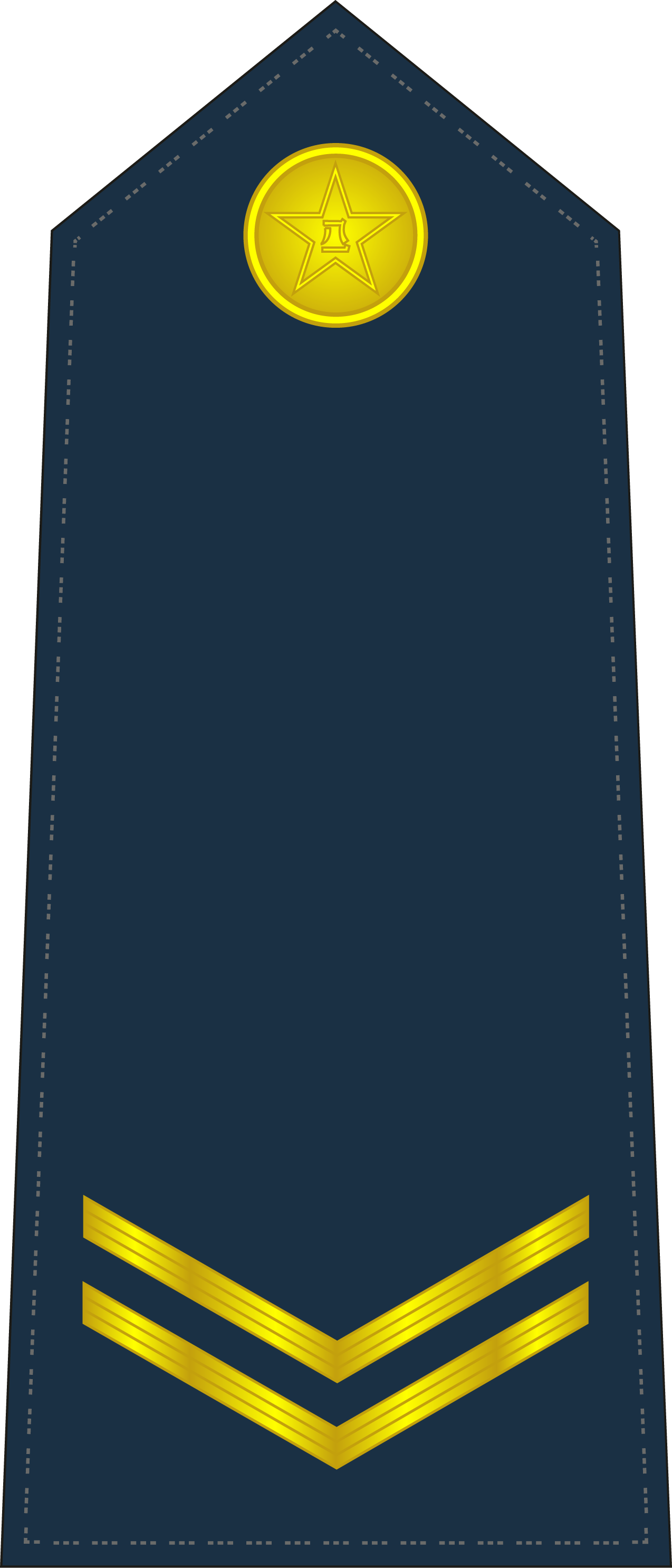
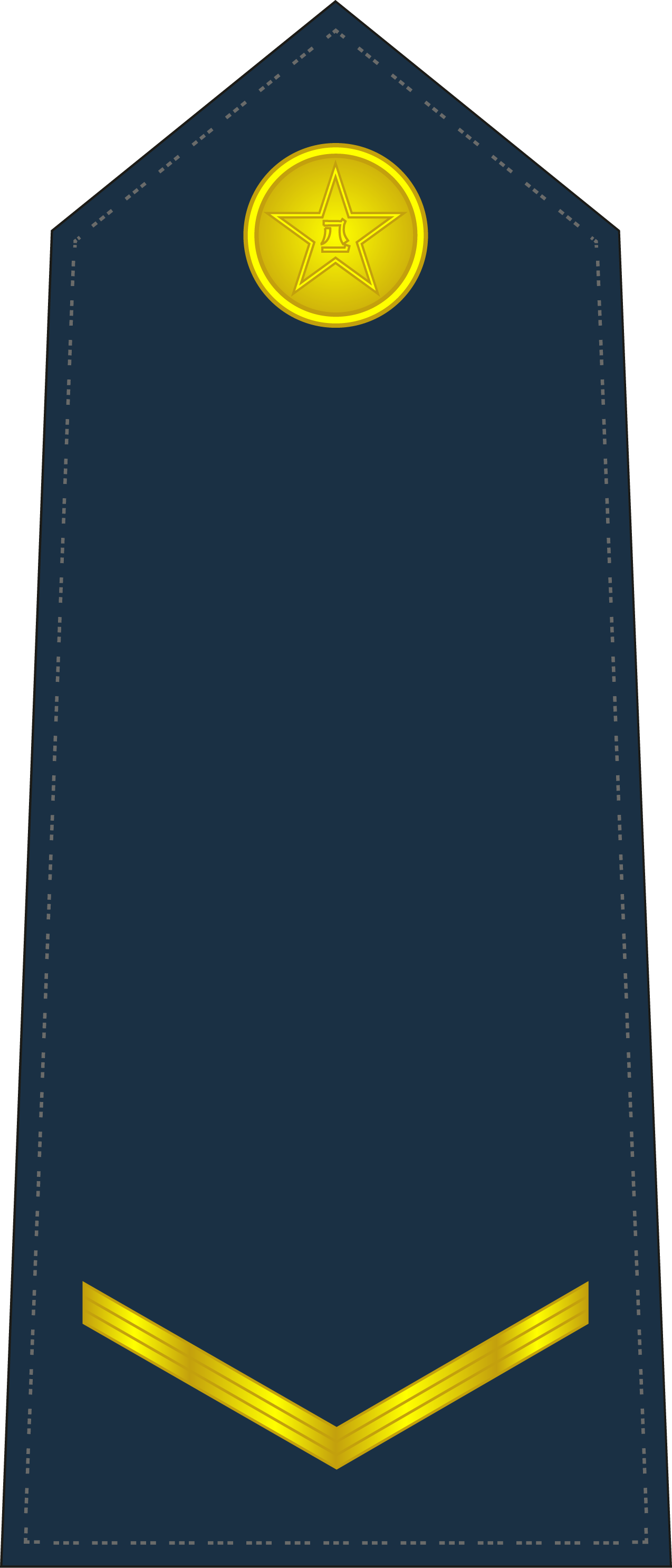
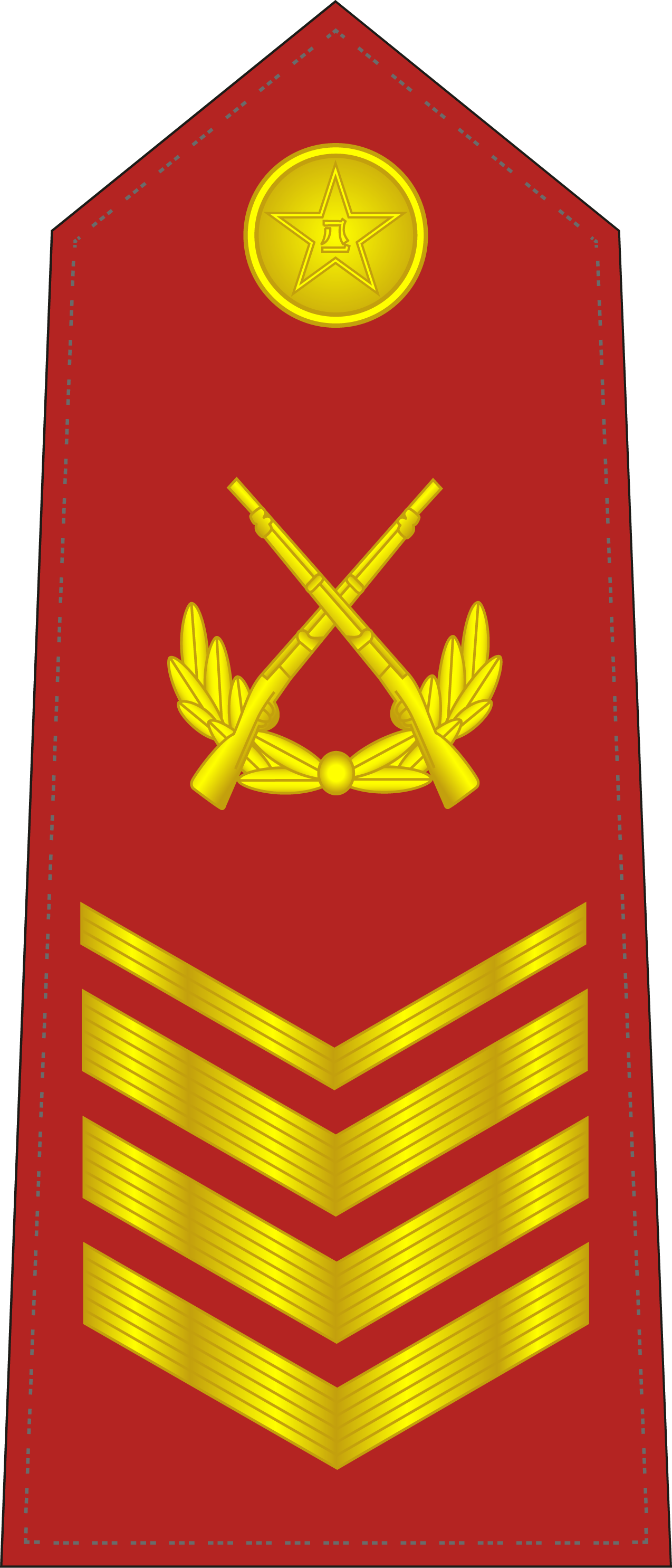
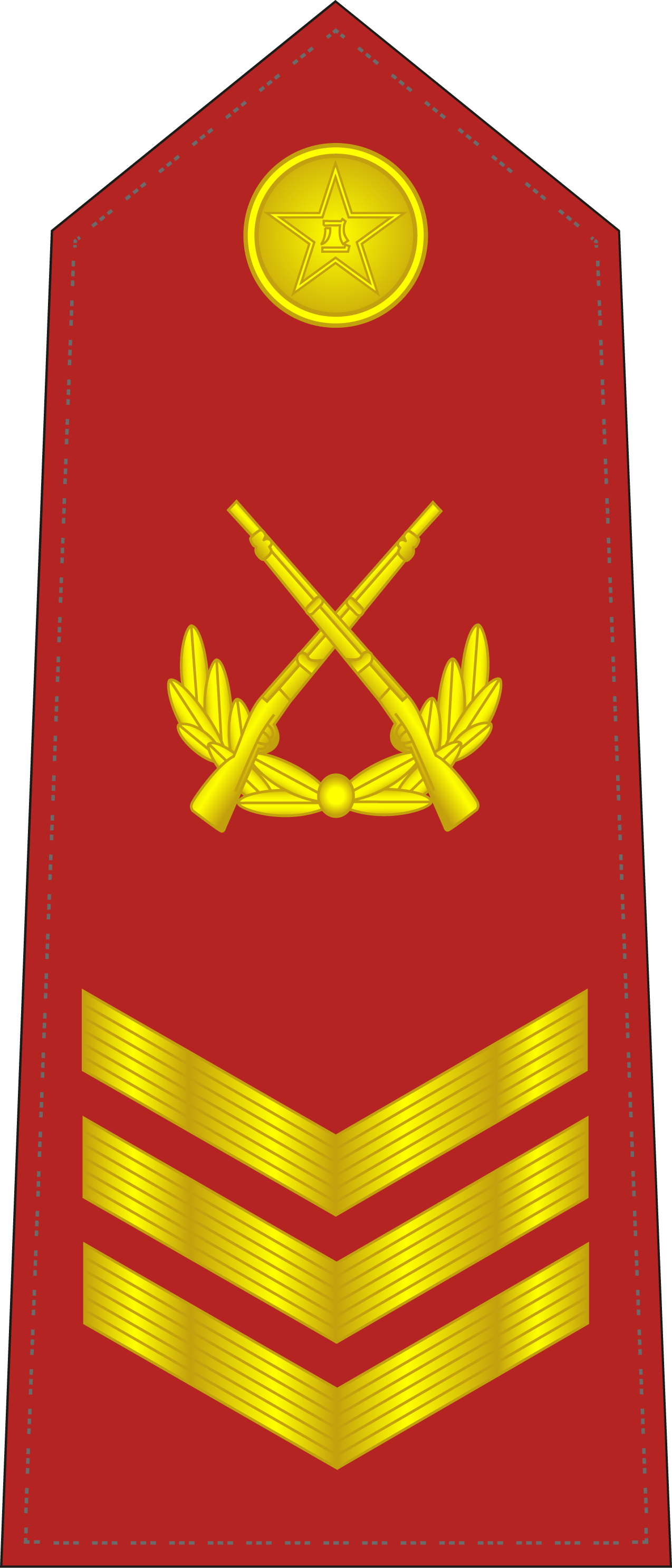
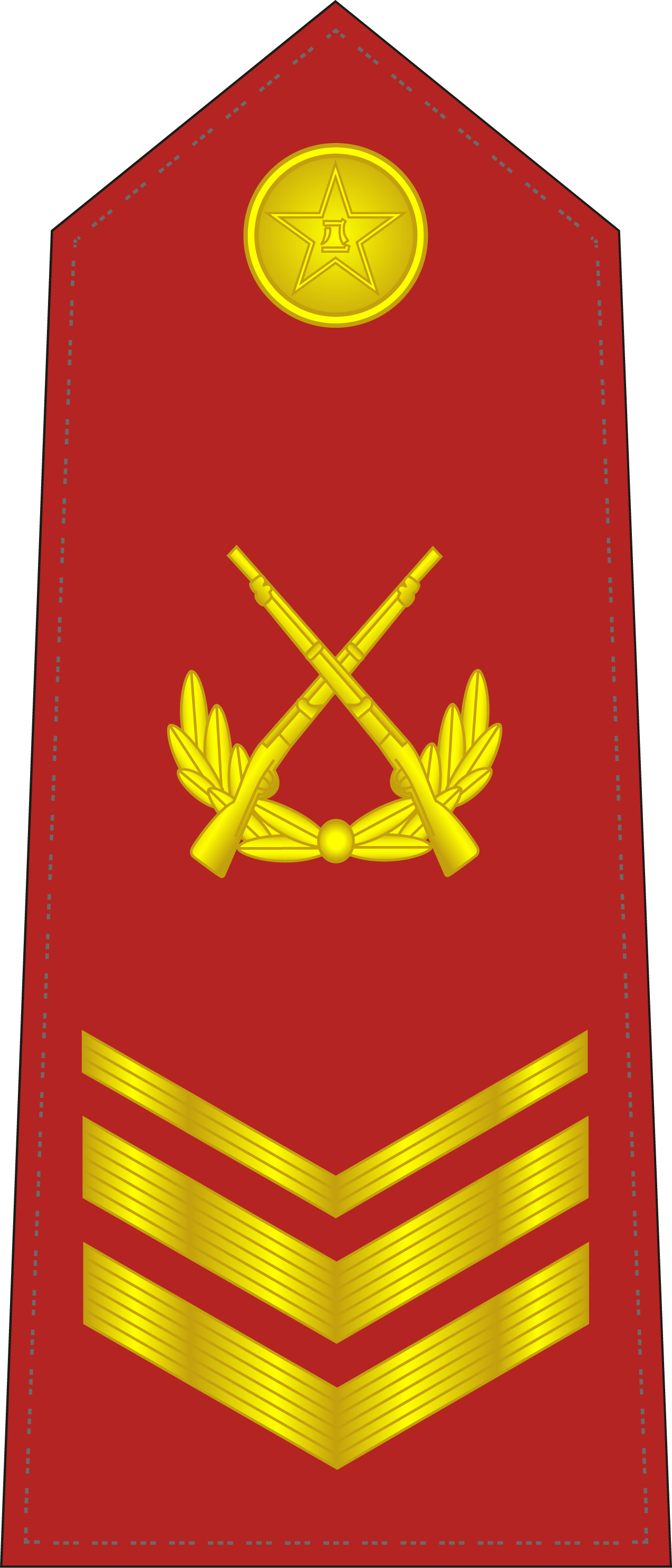
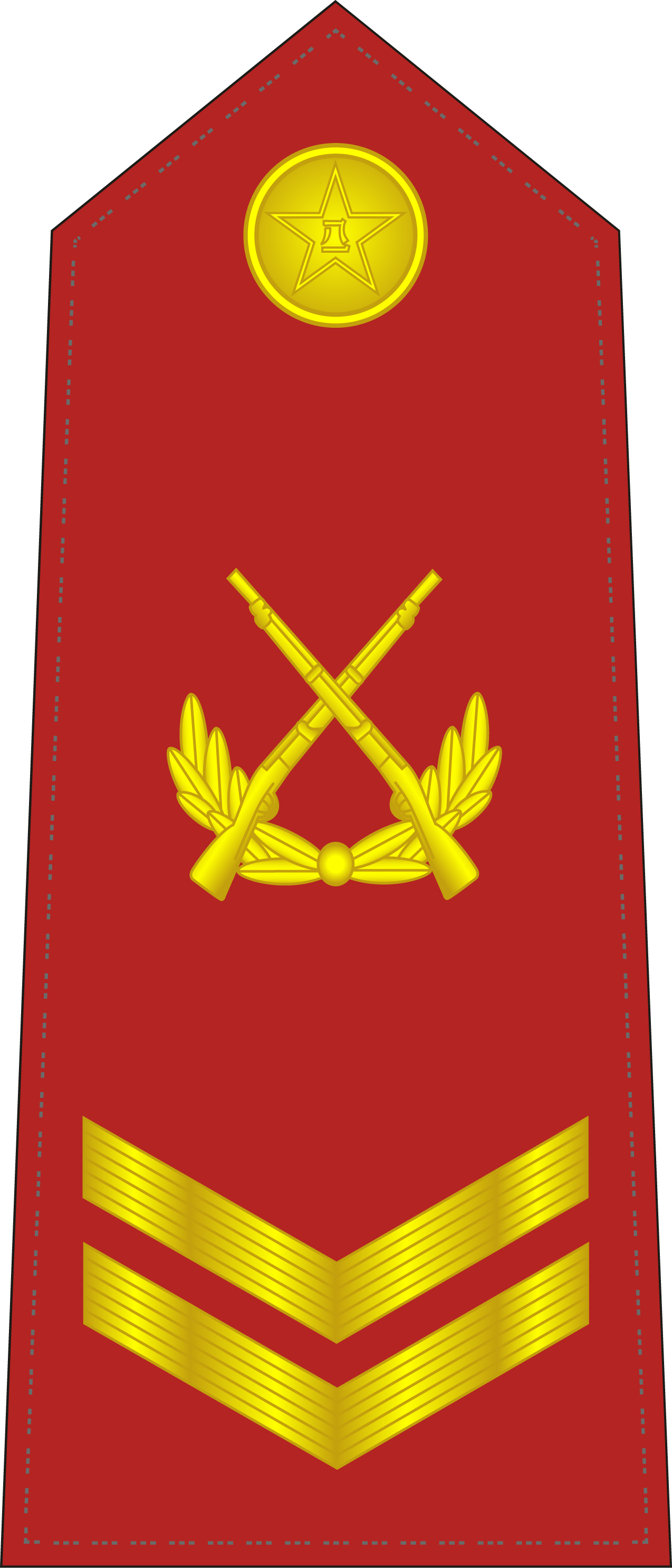
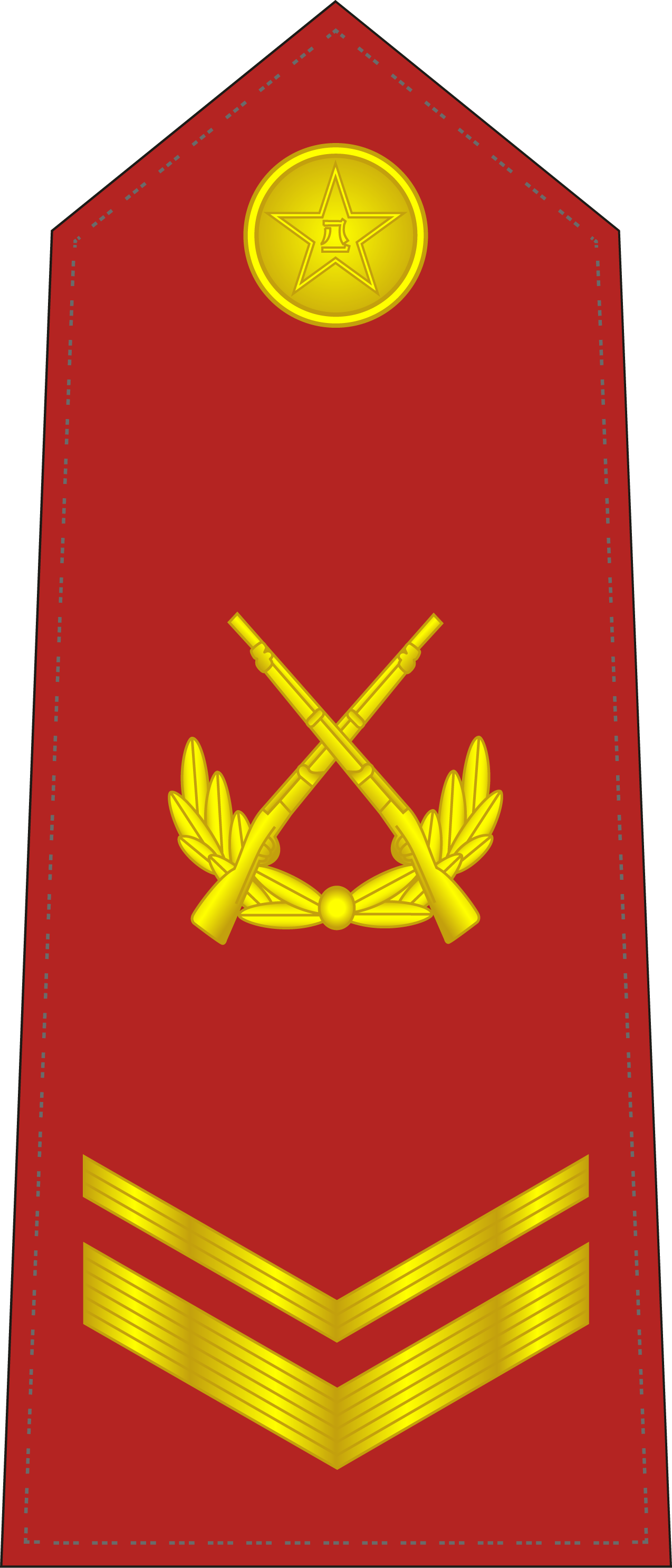
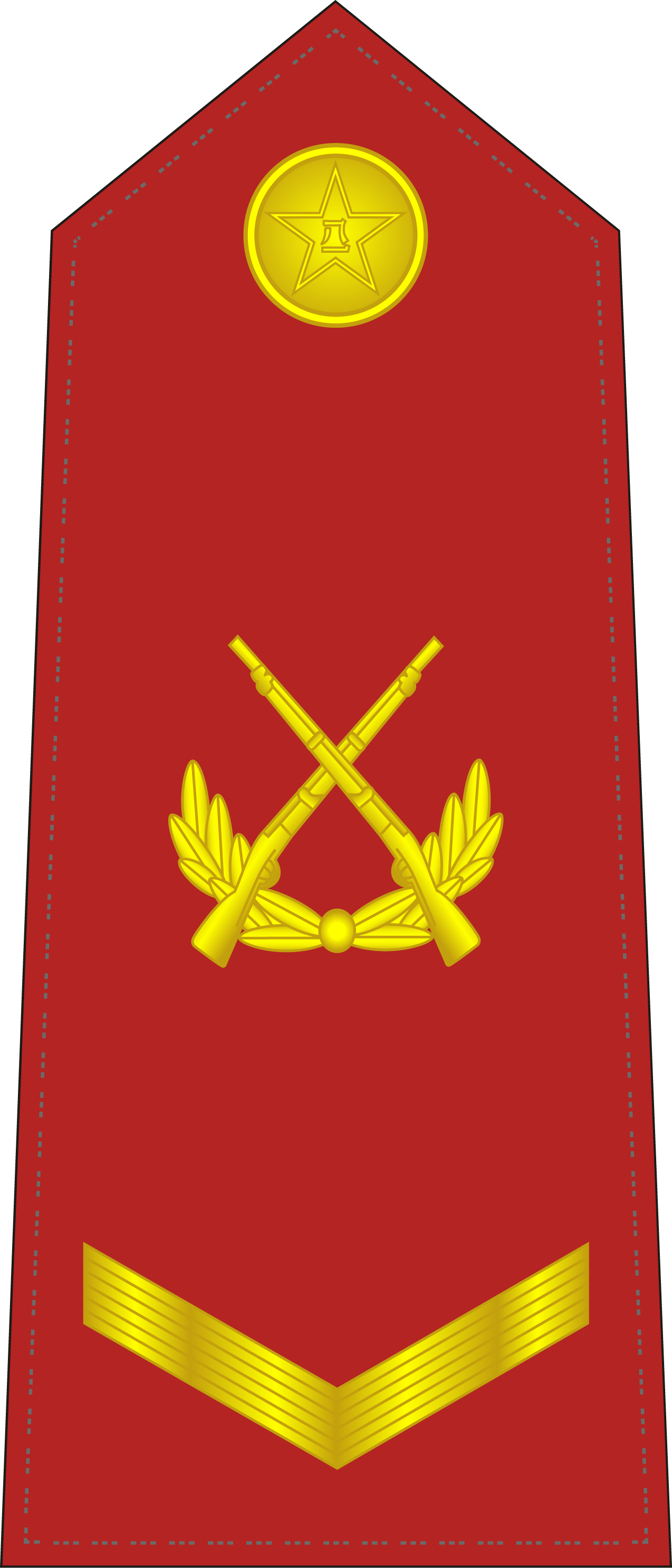
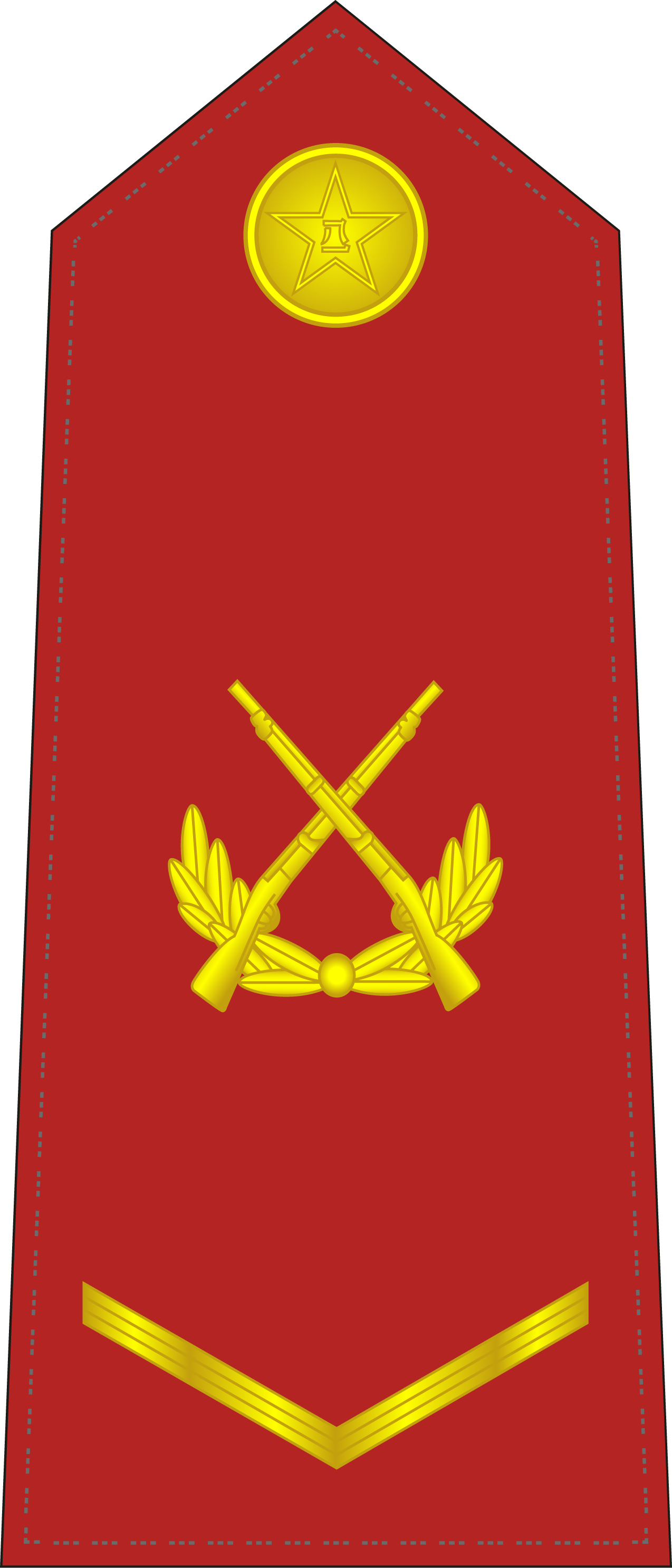
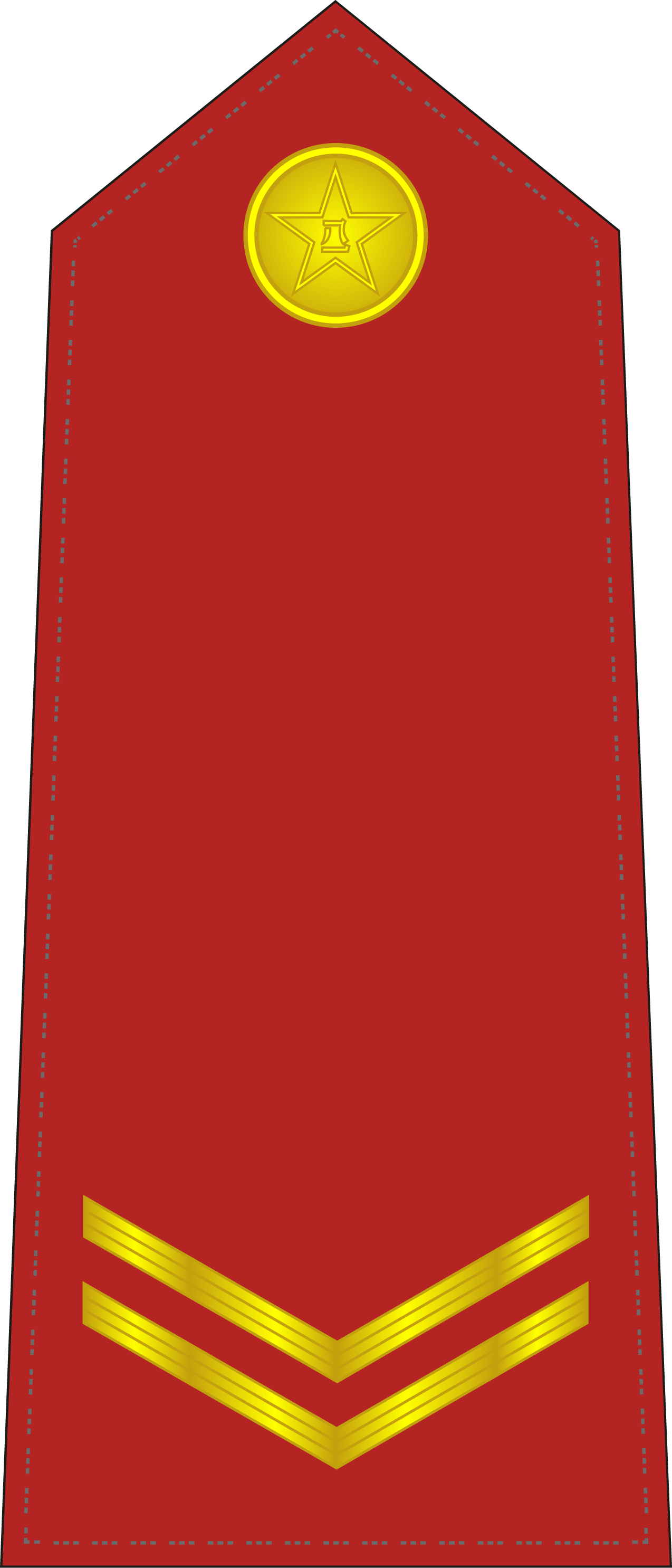
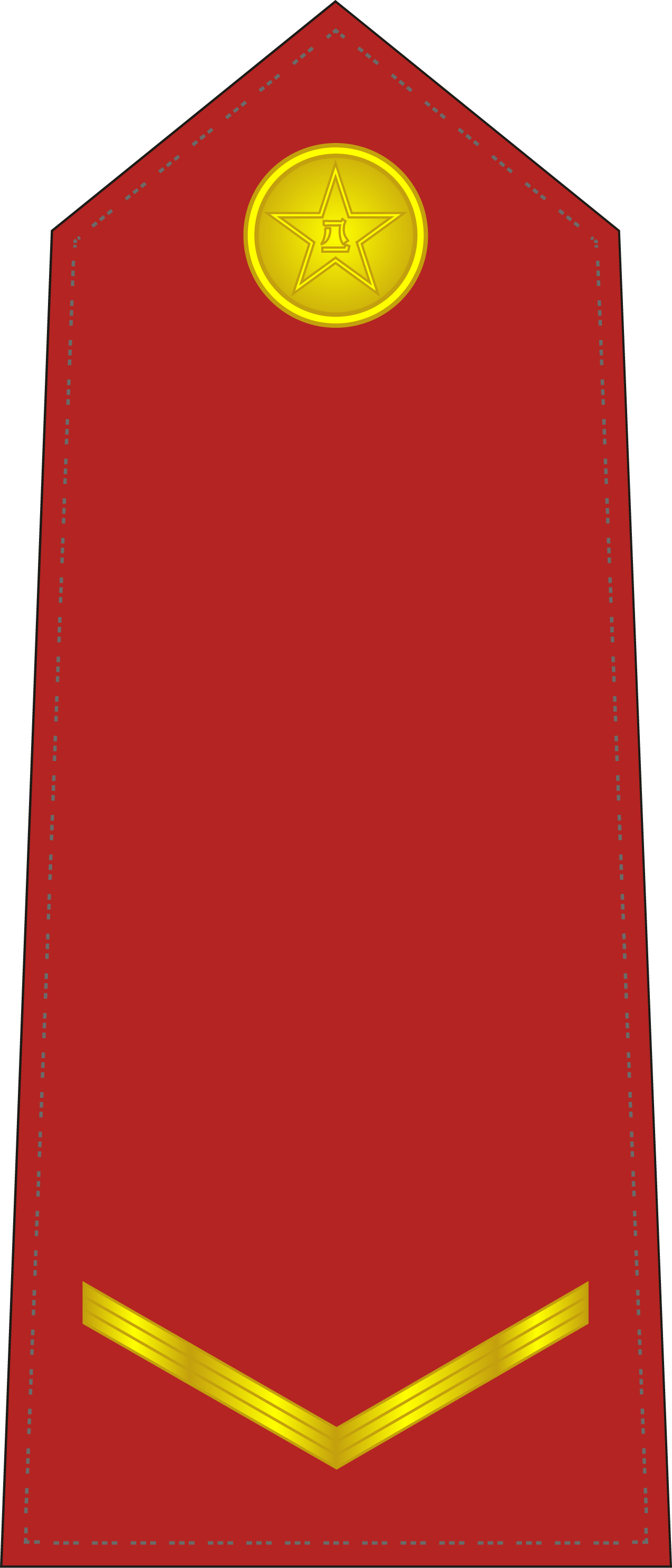
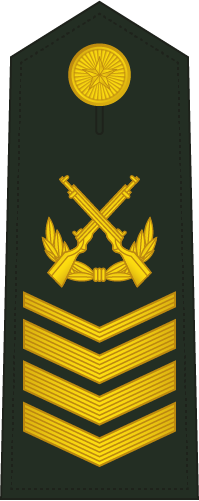
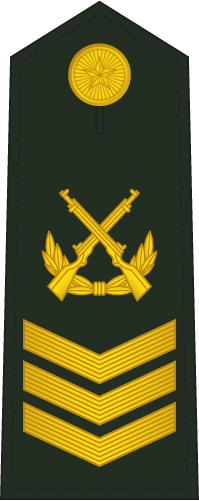
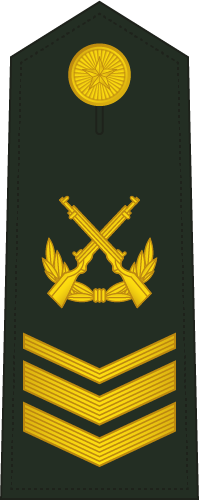
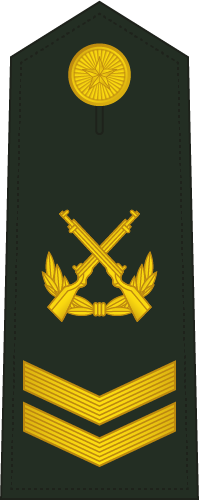
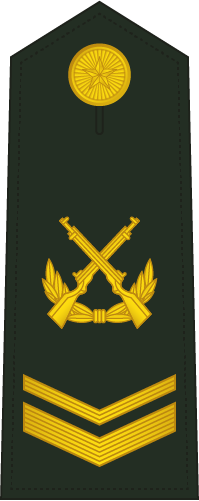
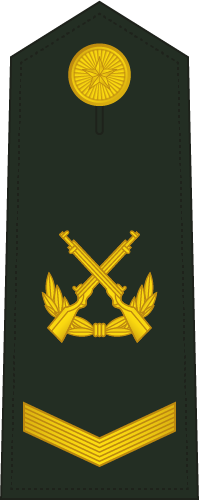
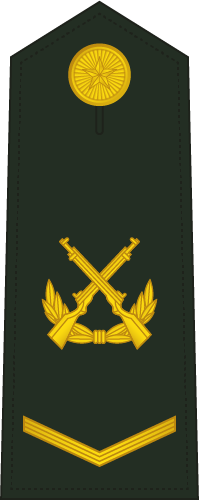
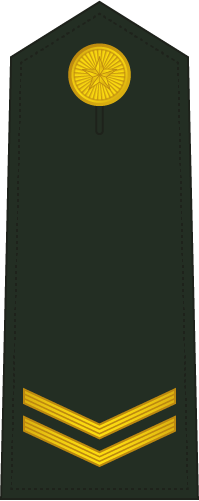
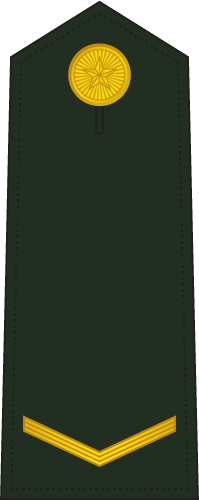
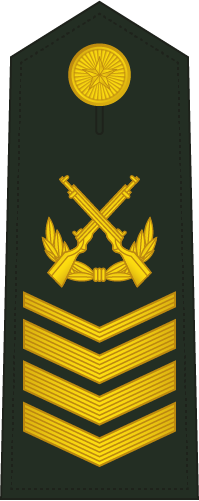
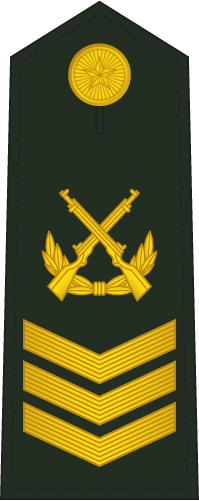
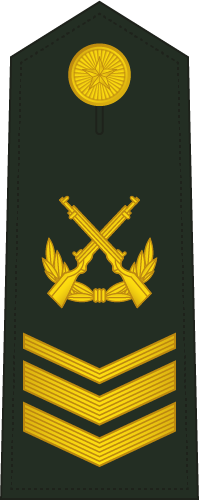
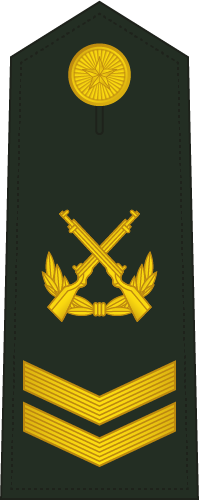
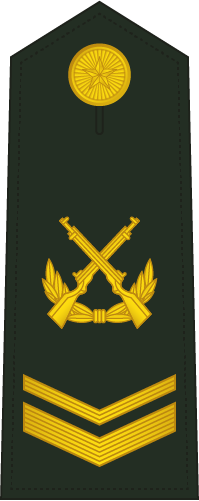
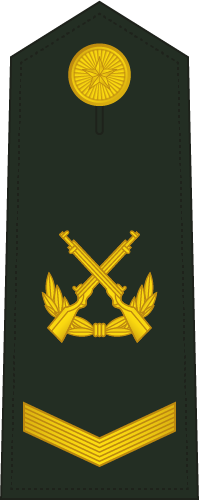
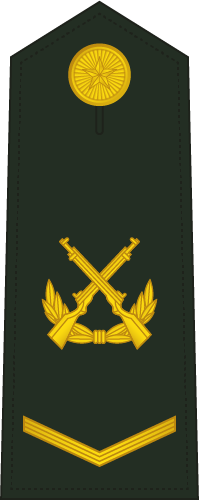
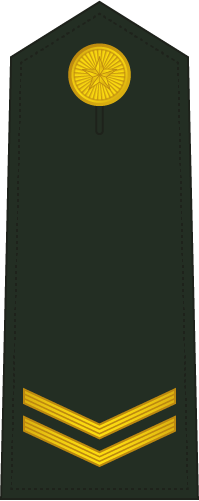
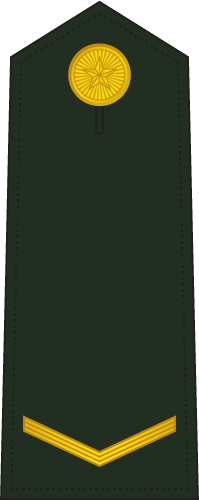
| Rank group | Senior NCOs | | | | | | Junior NCOs | Enlisted |
|---|---|---|---|---|---|---|---|---|---|
| PLA Ground Force |
| PLA Ground Force | 一级军士长; Yījí jūnshìzhǎng | 二级军士长; Èrjí jūnshìzhǎng | 三级军士长; Sānjí jūnshìzhǎng | 四级军士长; Sìjí jūnshìzhǎng | 上士; Shàngshì | 中士; Zhōngshì | 下士; Xiàshì | 上等兵; Shàngděngbīng | 列兵; Lièbīng |
| PLA Navy |
| PLA Navy | 海军一级军士长; Hǎijūn yījí jūnshìzhǎng | 海军二级军士长; Hǎijūn èrjí jūnshìzhǎng | 海军三级军士长; Hǎijūn sānjí jūnshìzhǎng | 海军四级军士长; Hǎijūn sìjí jūnshìzhǎng | 海军上士; Hǎijūn shàngshì | 海军中士; Hǎijūn zhōngshì | 海军下士; Hǎijūn xiàshì | 海军上等兵; Hǎijūn shàngděngbīng | 海军列兵; Hǎijūn lièbīng |
| PLA Air Force |
| PLA Air Force | 空军一级军士长; Kōngjūn yījí jūnshìzhǎng | 空军二级军士长; Kōngjūn èrjí jūnshìzhǎng | 空军三级军士长; Kōngjūn sānjí jūnshìzhǎng | 空军四级军士长; Kōngjūn sìjí jūnshìzhǎng | 空军上士; Kōngjūn shàngshì | 空军中士; Kōngjūn zhōngshì | 空军下士; Kōngjūn xiàshì | 空军上等兵; Kōngjūn shàngděngbīng | 空军列兵; Kōngjūn lièbīng |
| People's Armed Police |
| People's Armed Police | 武警一级警士长; Wǔjǐng Yījí jǐngshìzhǎng | 武警二级警士长; Wǔjǐng Èrjí jǐngshìzhǎng | 武警三级警士长; Wǔjǐng Sānjí jǐngshìzhǎng | 武警四级警士长; Wǔjǐng Sìjí jǐngshìzhǎng | 武警上士; Wǔjǐng Shàngshì | 武警中士; Wǔjǐng Zhōngshì | 武警下士; Wǔjǐng Xiàshì | 武警上等兵; Wǔjǐng Shàngděngbīng | 武警列兵; Wǔjǐng Lièbīng |
| PLA Aerospace Force |
| PLA Aerospace Force | 一级军士长; Yījí jūnshìzhǎng | 二级军士长; Èrjí jūnshìzhǎng | 三级军士长; Sānjí jūnshìzhǎng | 四级军士长; Sìjí jūnshìzhǎng | 上士; Shàngshì | 中士; Zhōngshì | 下士; Xiàshì | 上等兵; Shàngděngbīng | 列兵; Lièbīng |
| PLA Cyberspace Force |
| PLA Cyberspace Force | 一级军士长; Yījí jūnshìzhǎng | 二级军士长; Èrjí jūnshìzhǎng | 三级军士长; Sānjí jūnshìzhǎng | 四级军士长; Sìjí jūnshìzhǎng | 上士; Shàngshì | 中士; Zhōngshì | 下士; Xiàshì | 上等兵; Shàngděngbīng | 列兵; Lièbīng |
| Rank group | Senior NCOs | | | | | | Junior NCOs | Enlisted |

== See also ==
- Ranks of the People's Liberation Army Ground Force
- Ranks of the People's Liberation Army Navy
- Ranks of the People's Liberation Army Air Force
- Ranks of the People's Armed Police
