= Ranks of the People's Liberation Army Air Force =

The ranks in the Chinese People's Liberation Army Air Force are similar to those of the Chinese Army, formally known as the People's Liberation Army Ground Force, except that those of the PLA Air Force are prefixed by 空军 (Kong Jun) meaning Air Force. See Ranks of the People's Liberation Army or the article on an individual rank for details on the evolution of rank and insignia in the PLAAF. This article primarily covers the existing ranks and insignia.

== Current ranks ==
=== Ranks of officers ===
The current system of officer ranks and insignia dates from 1988 and is a revision of the ranks and insignia used from 1955 to 1965. The rank of Kong Jun Yi Ji Shang Jiang (First Class General) was never held and was abolished in 1994.

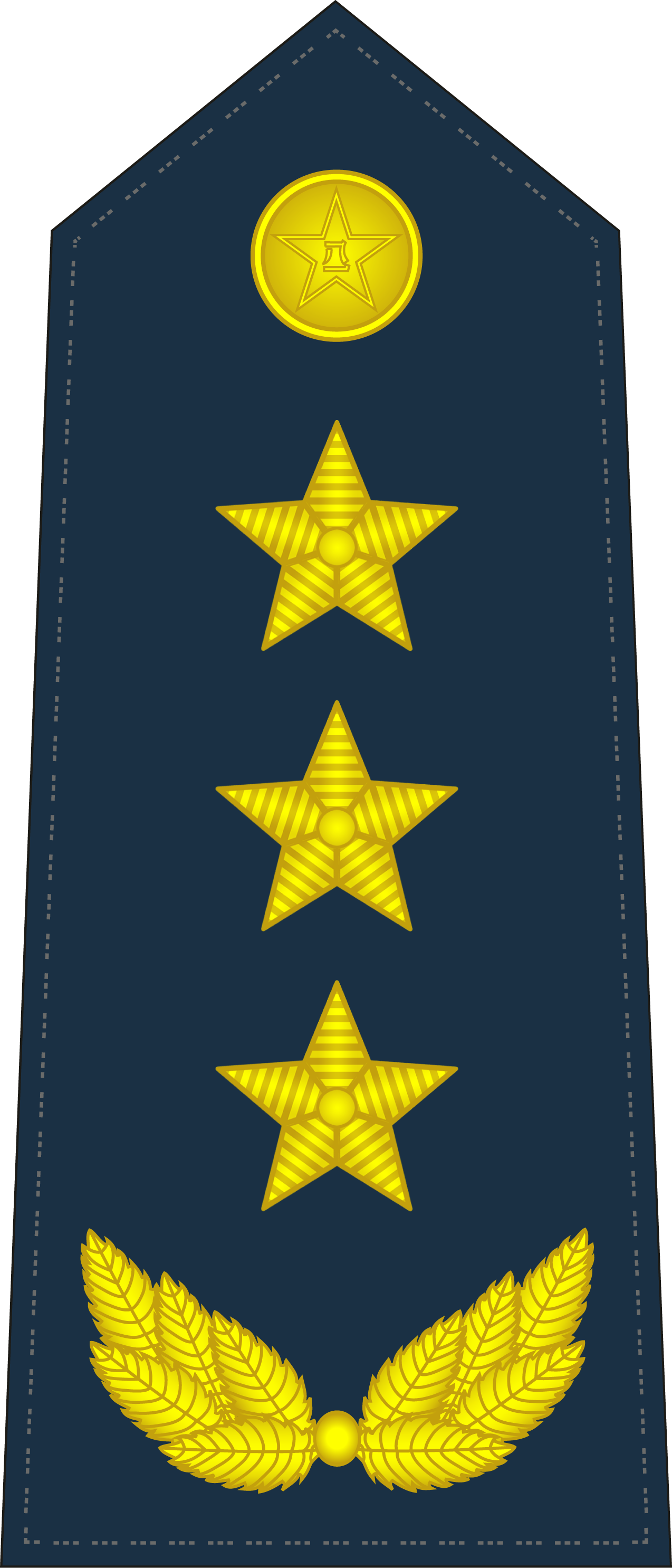
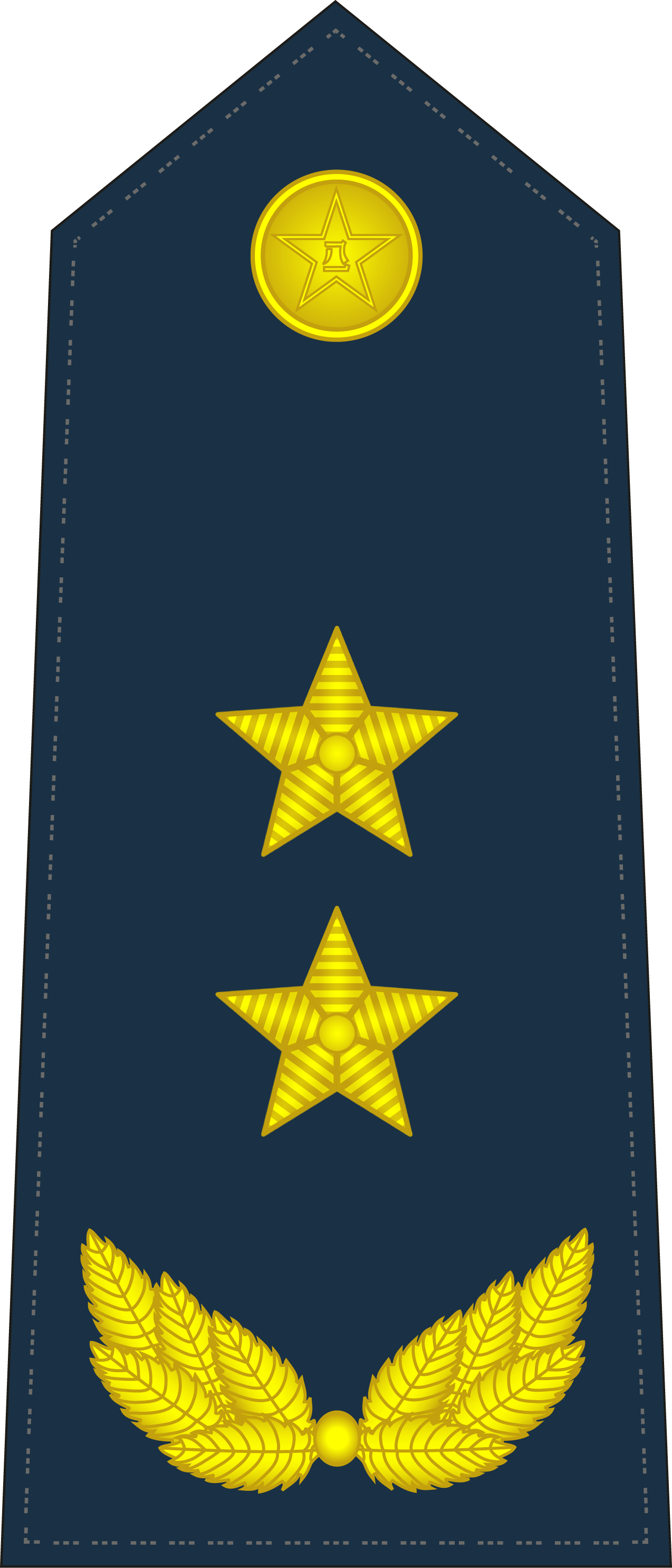
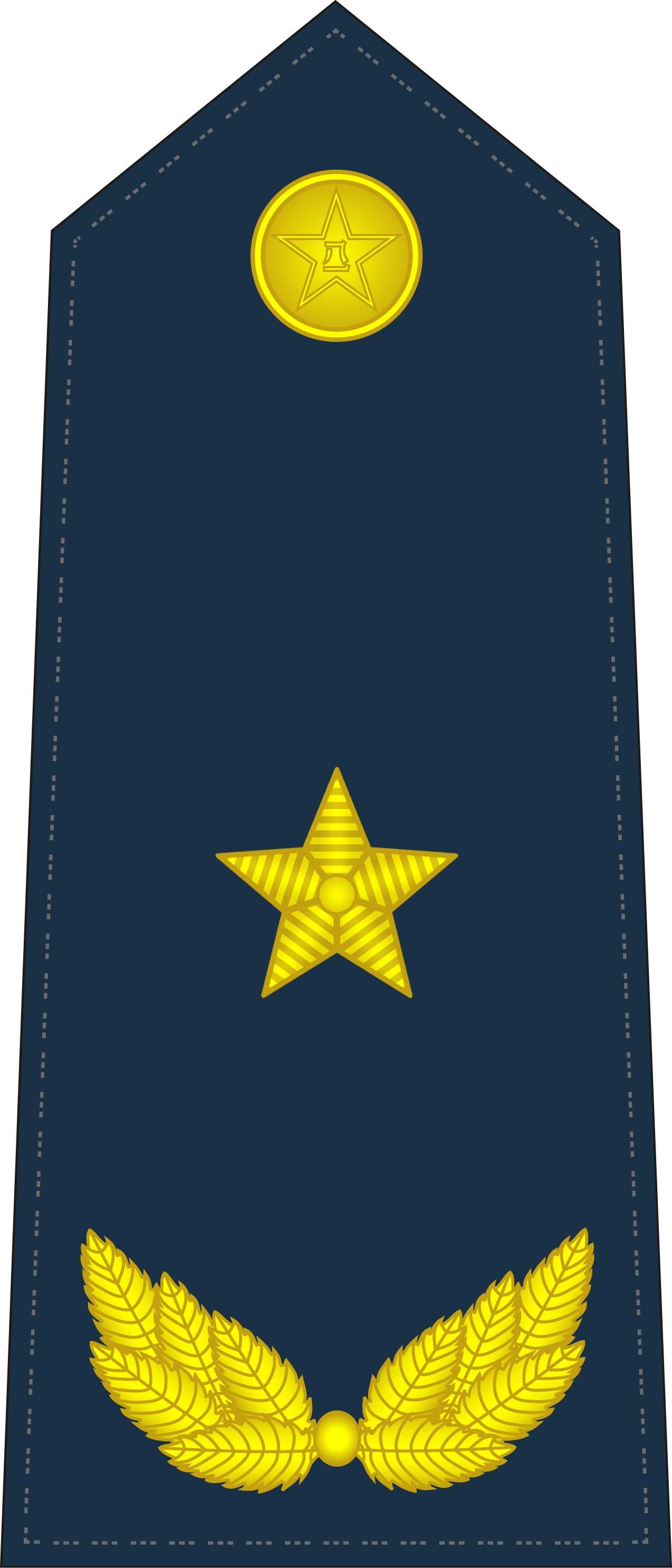
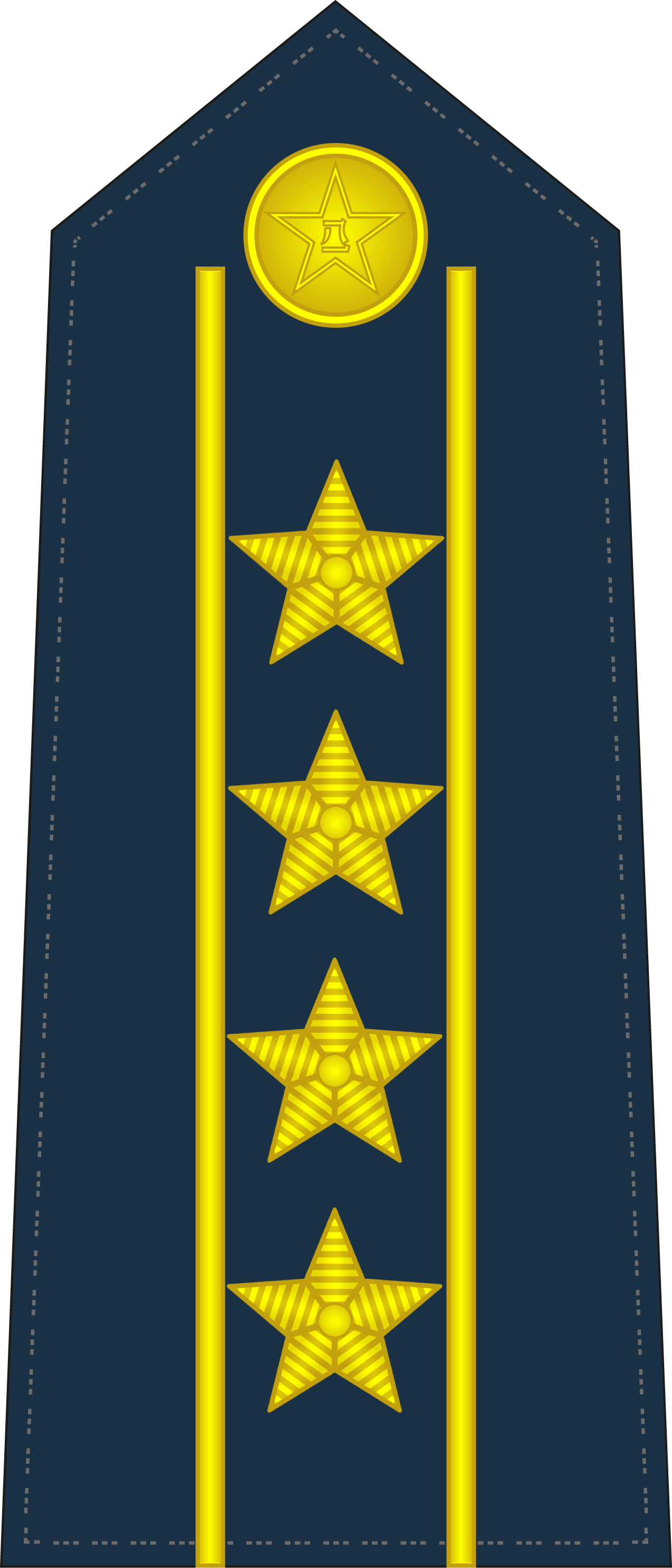
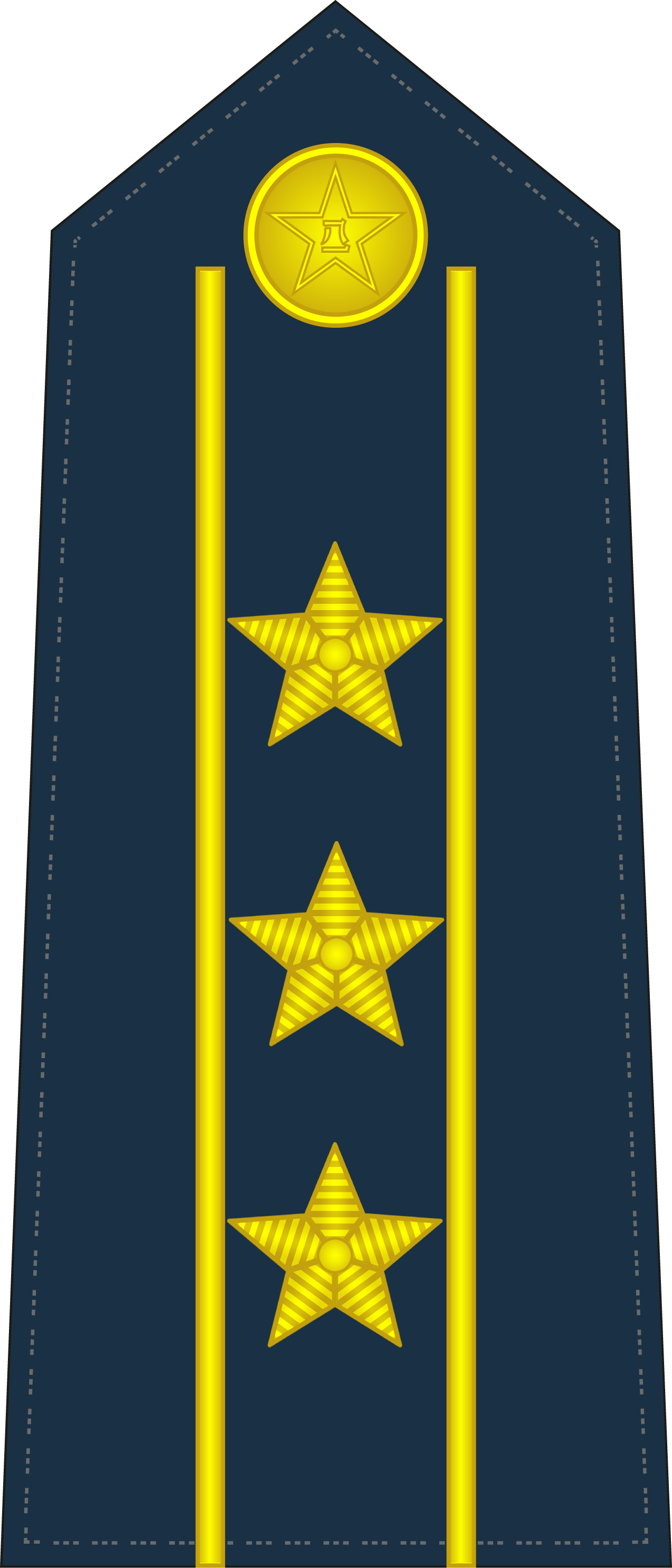
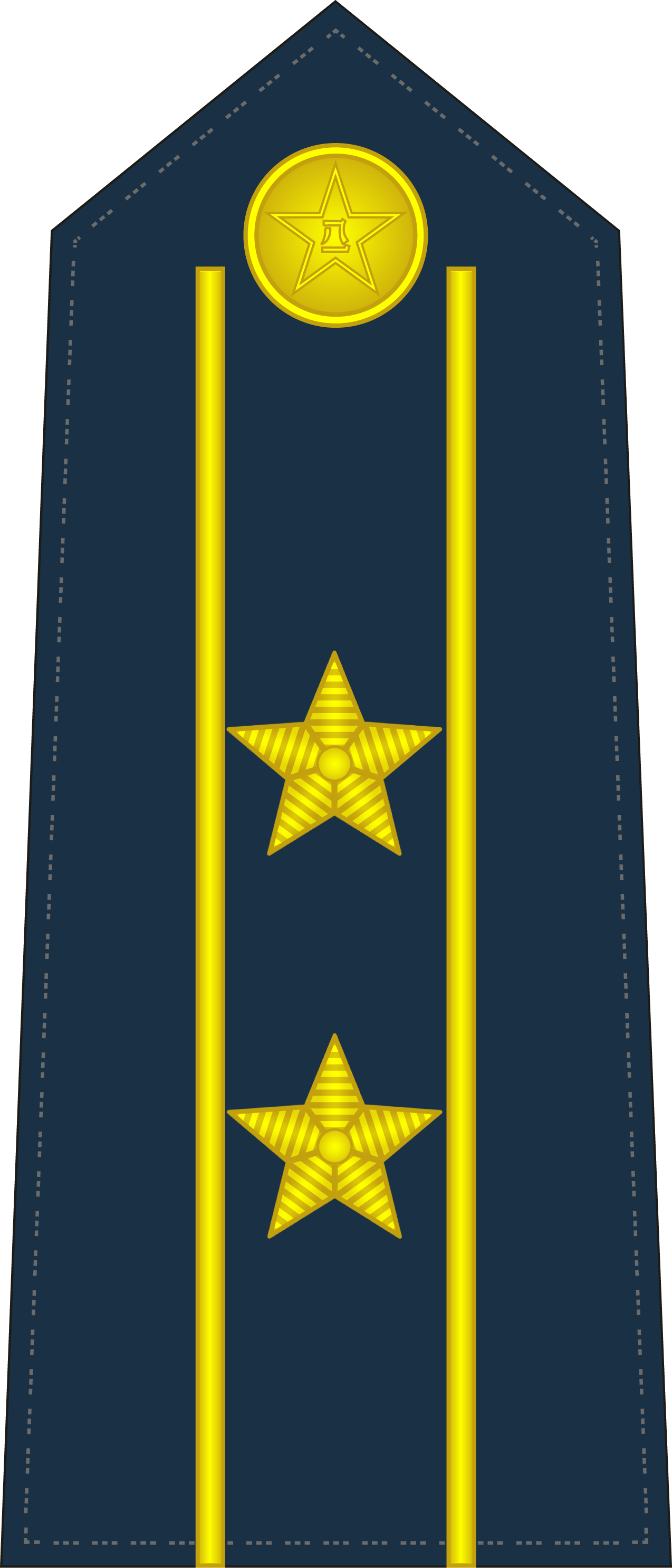
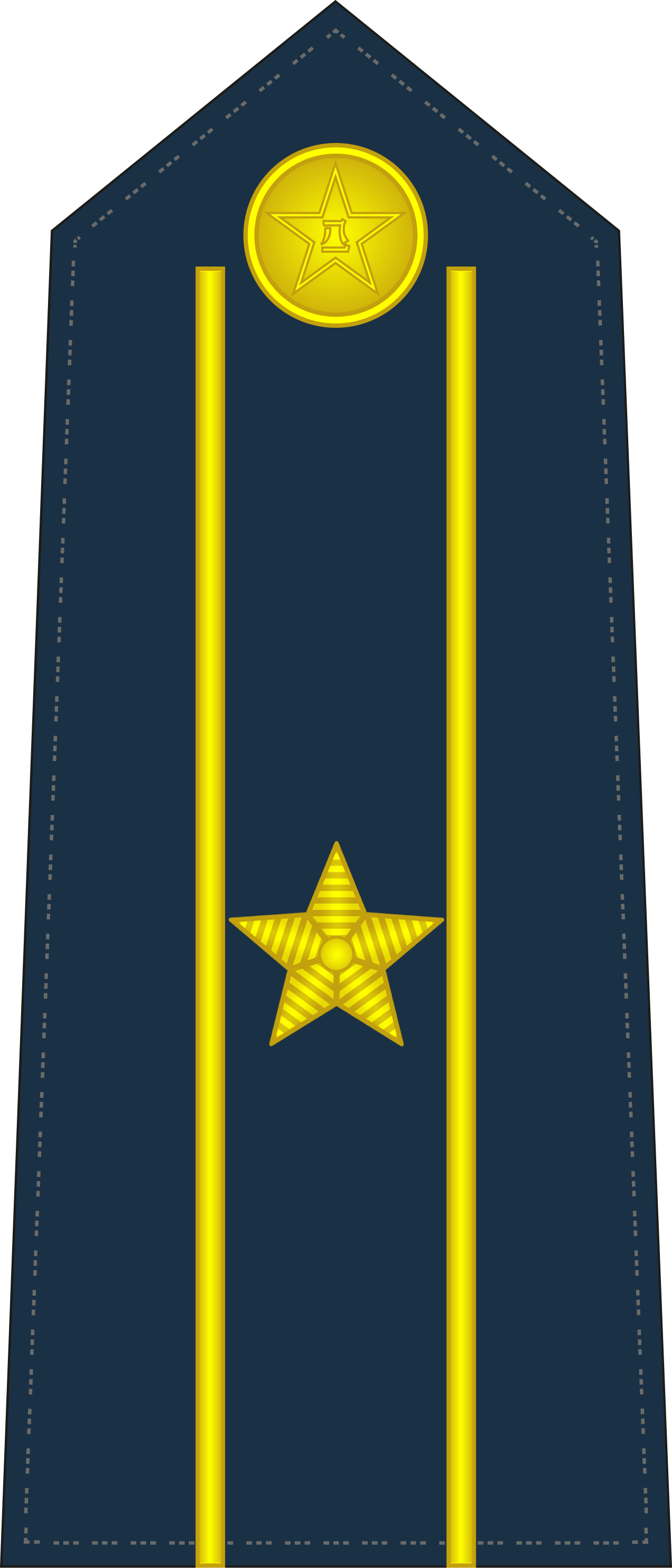
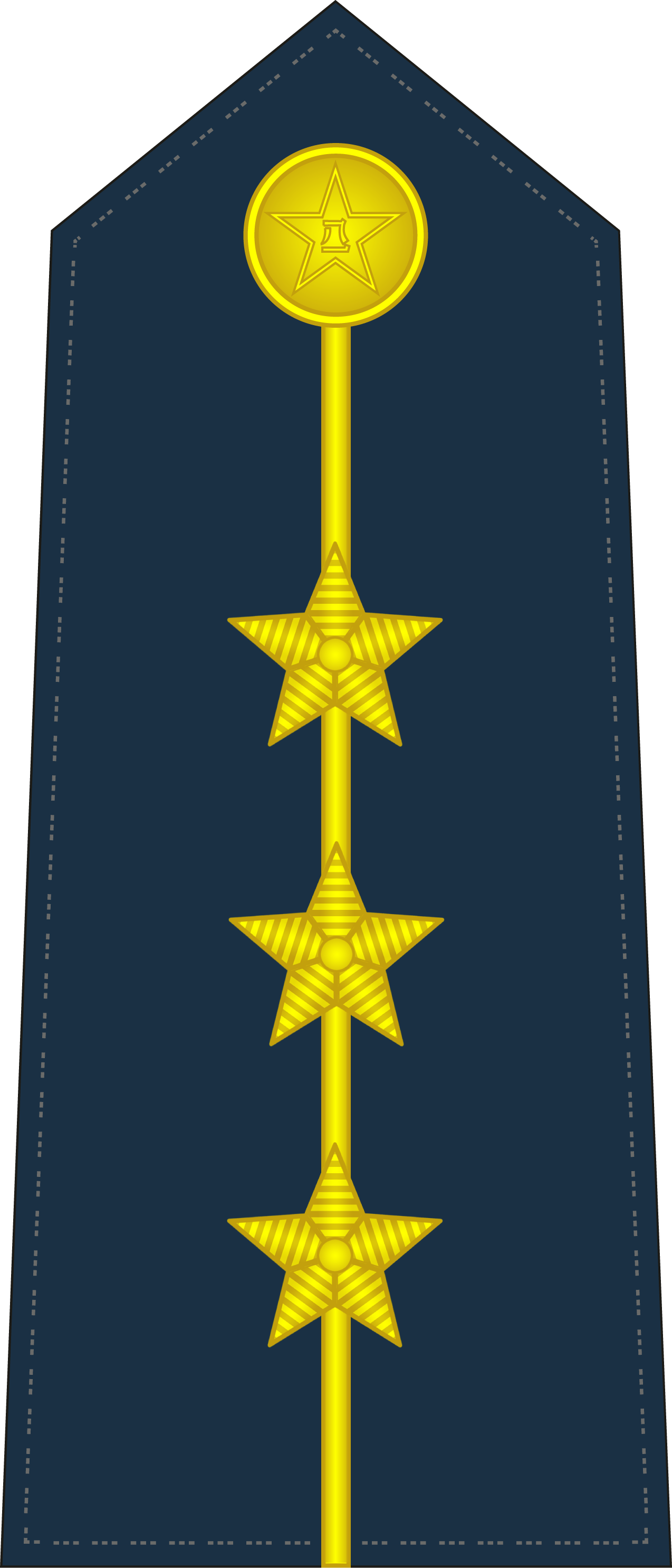
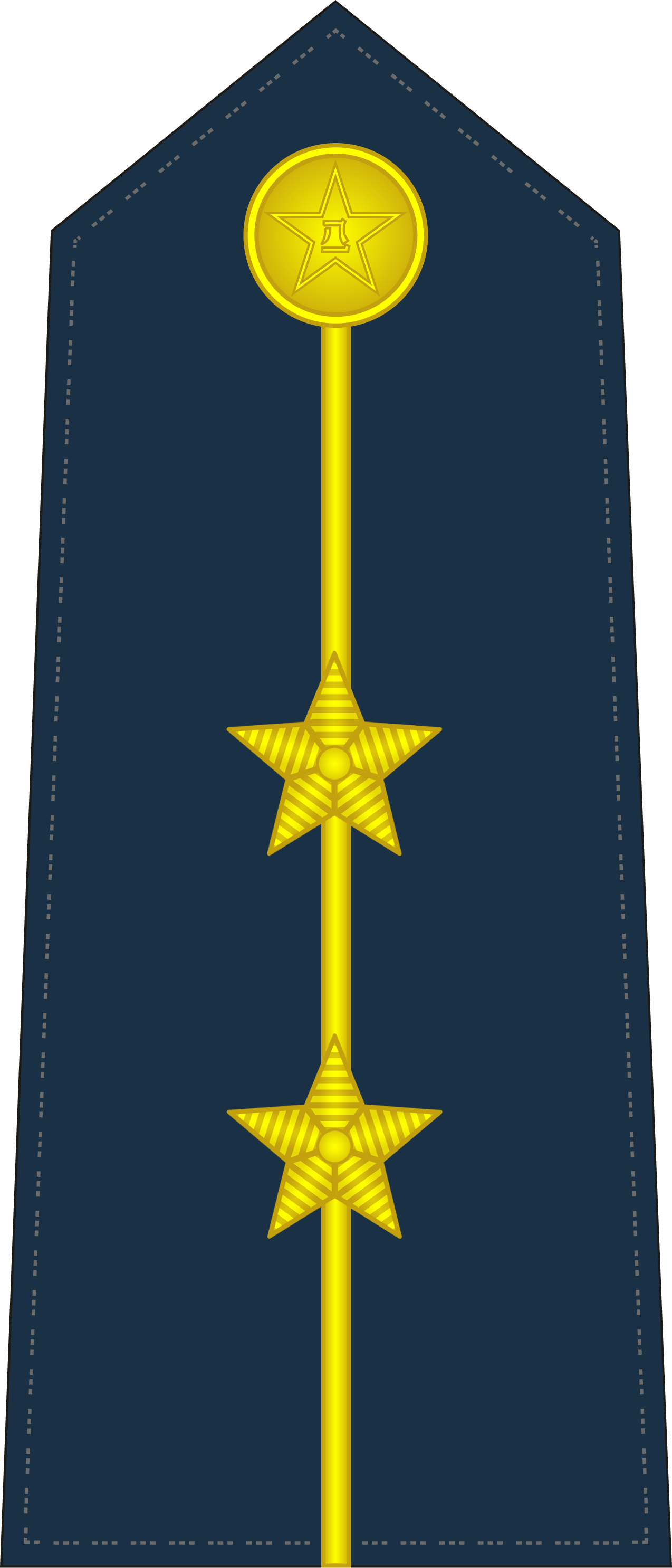
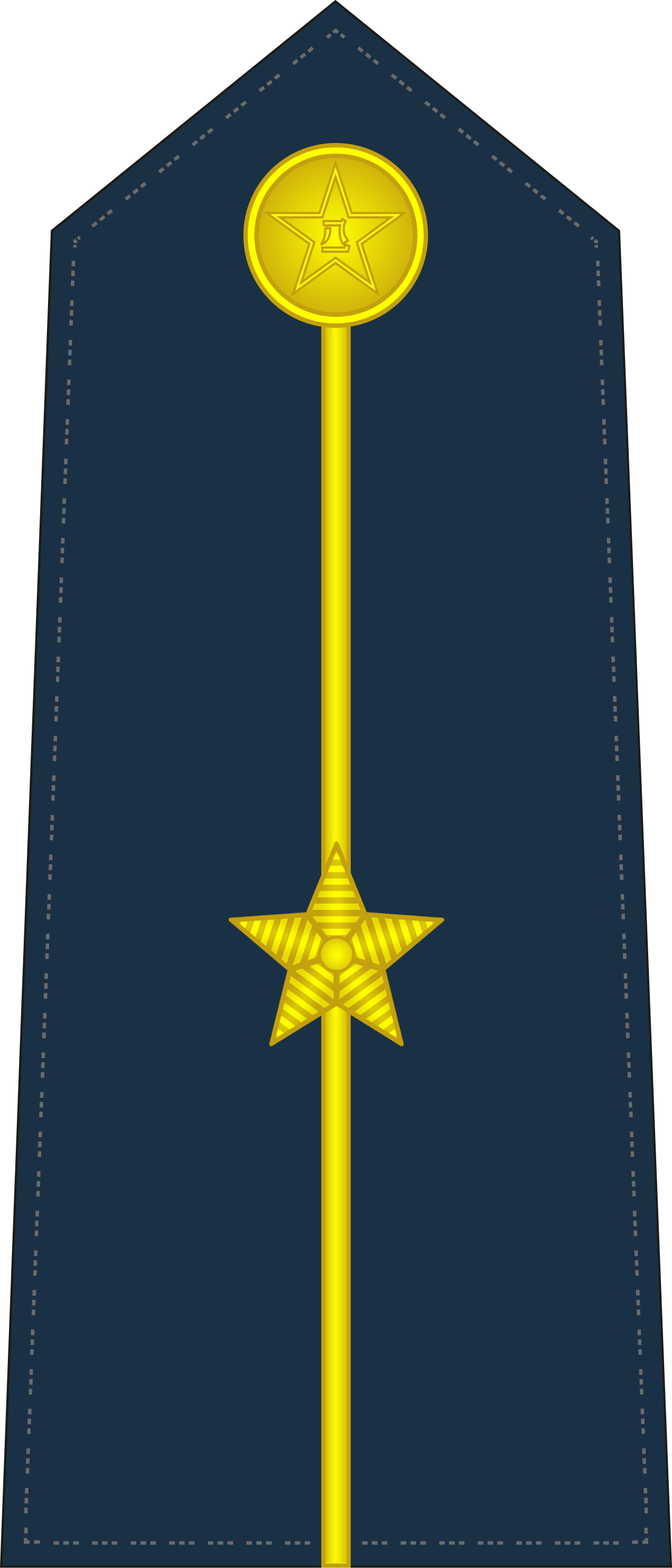
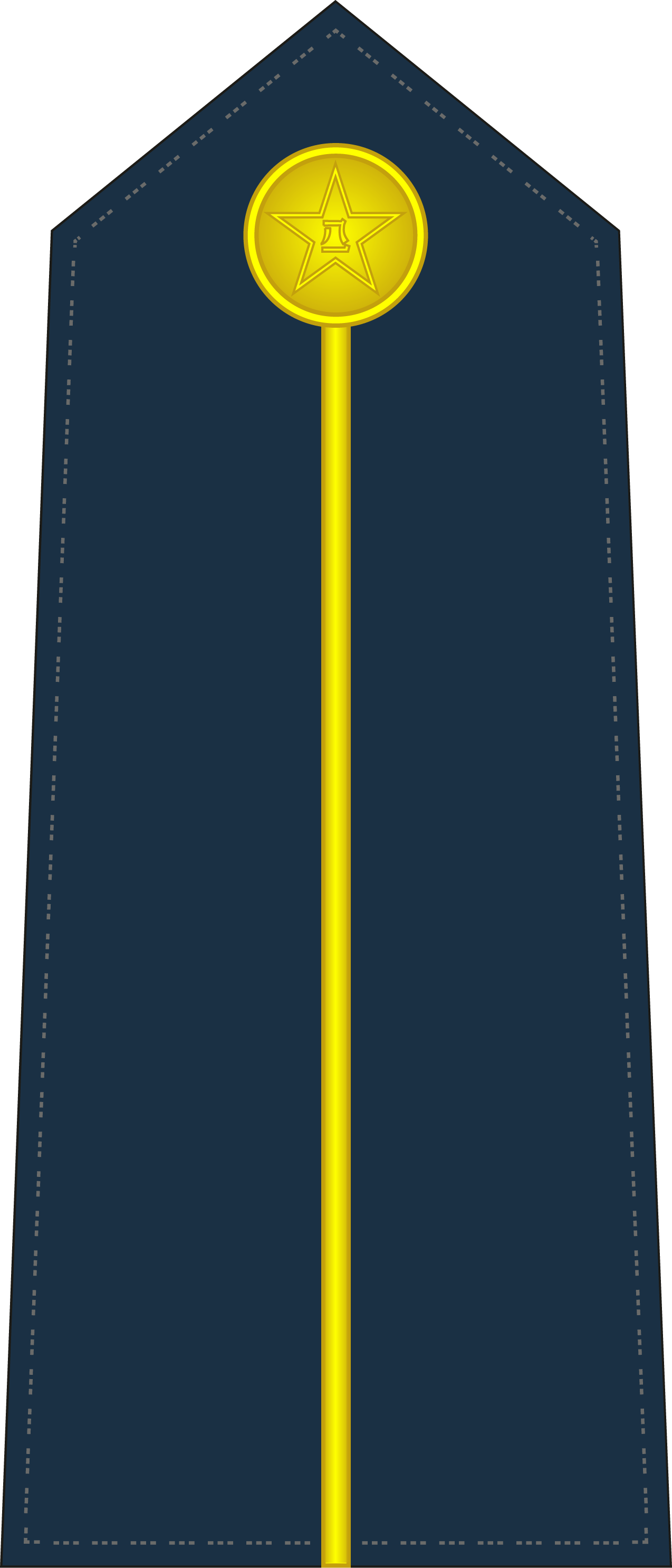
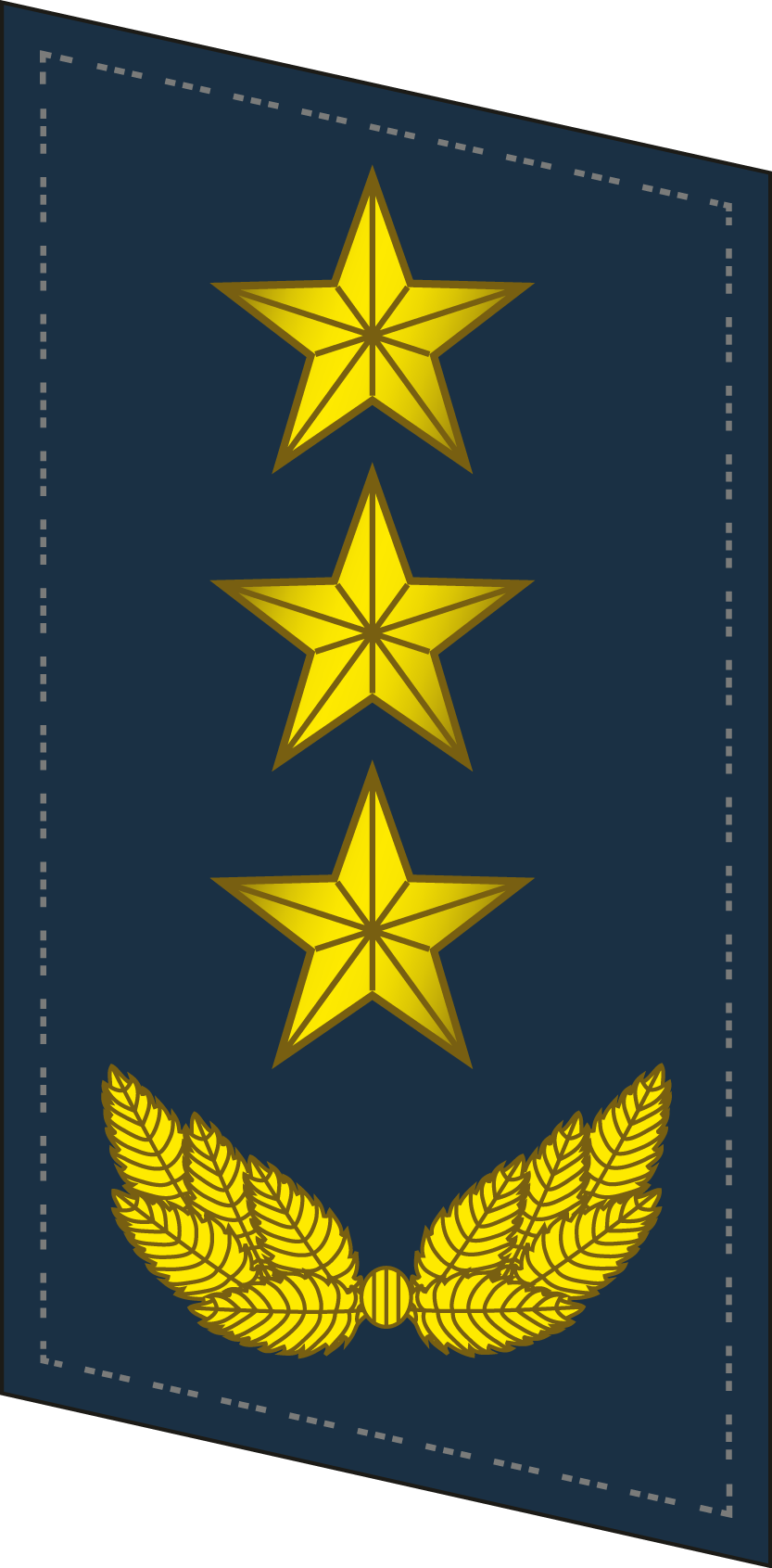
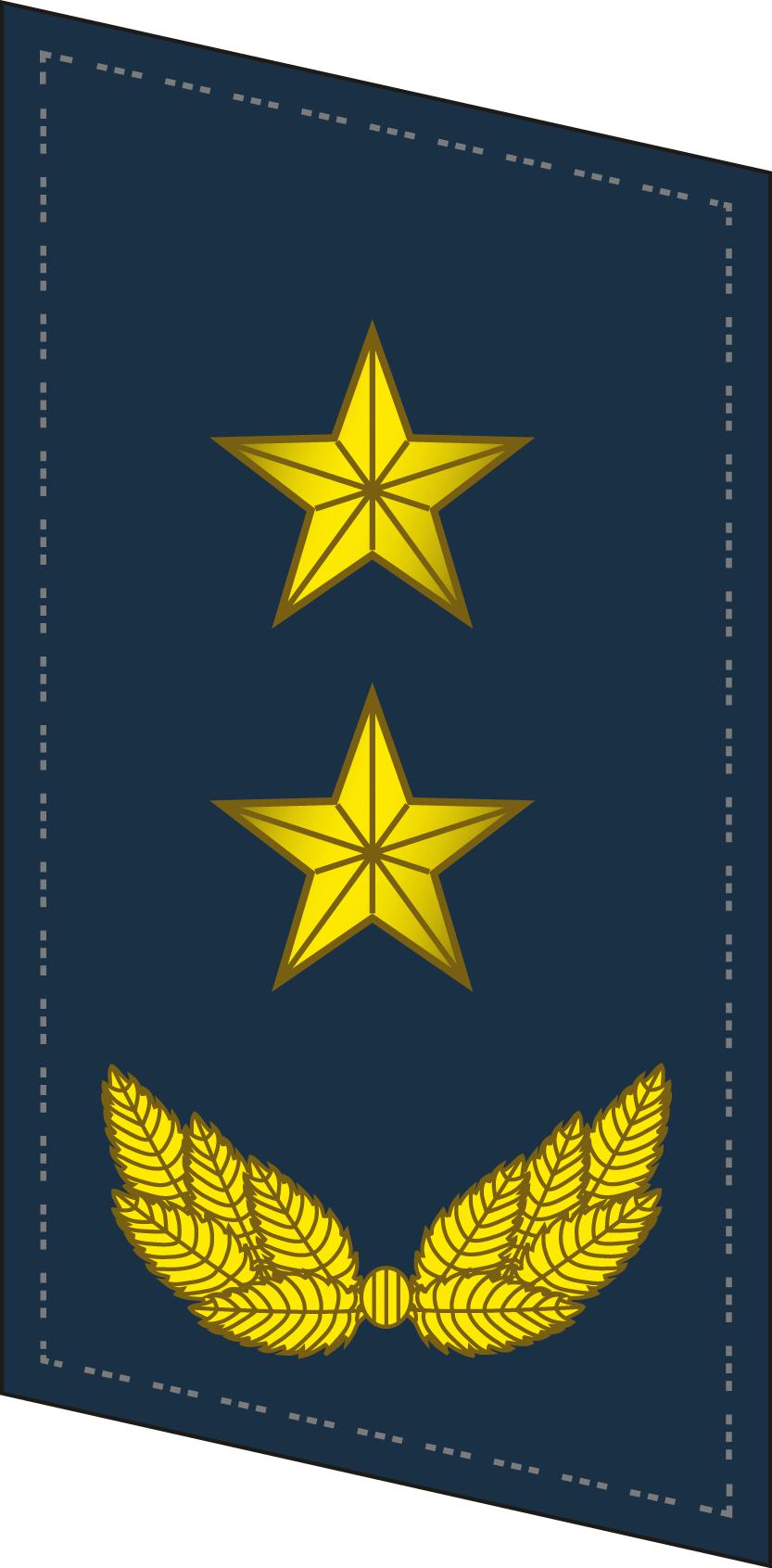
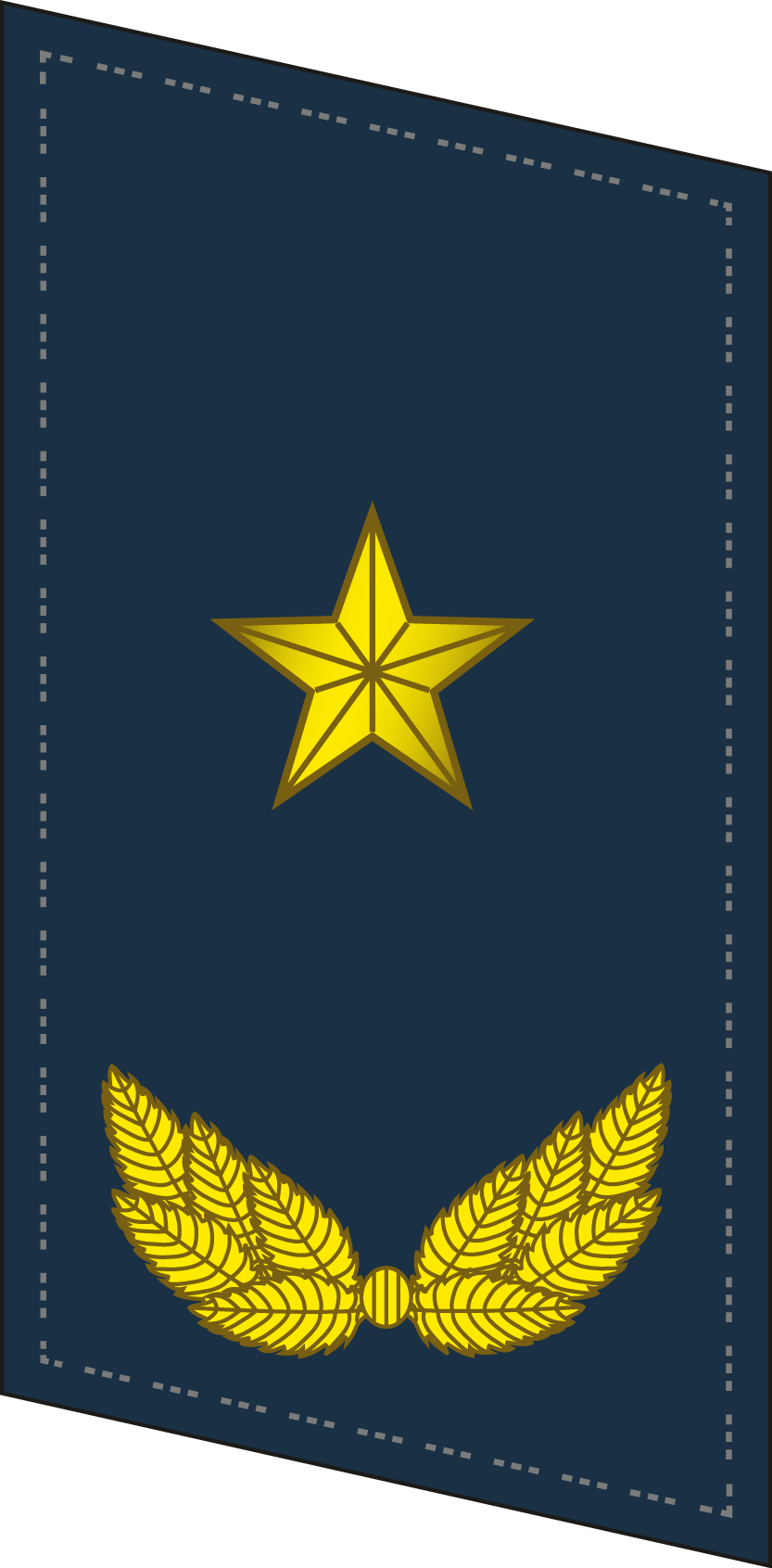
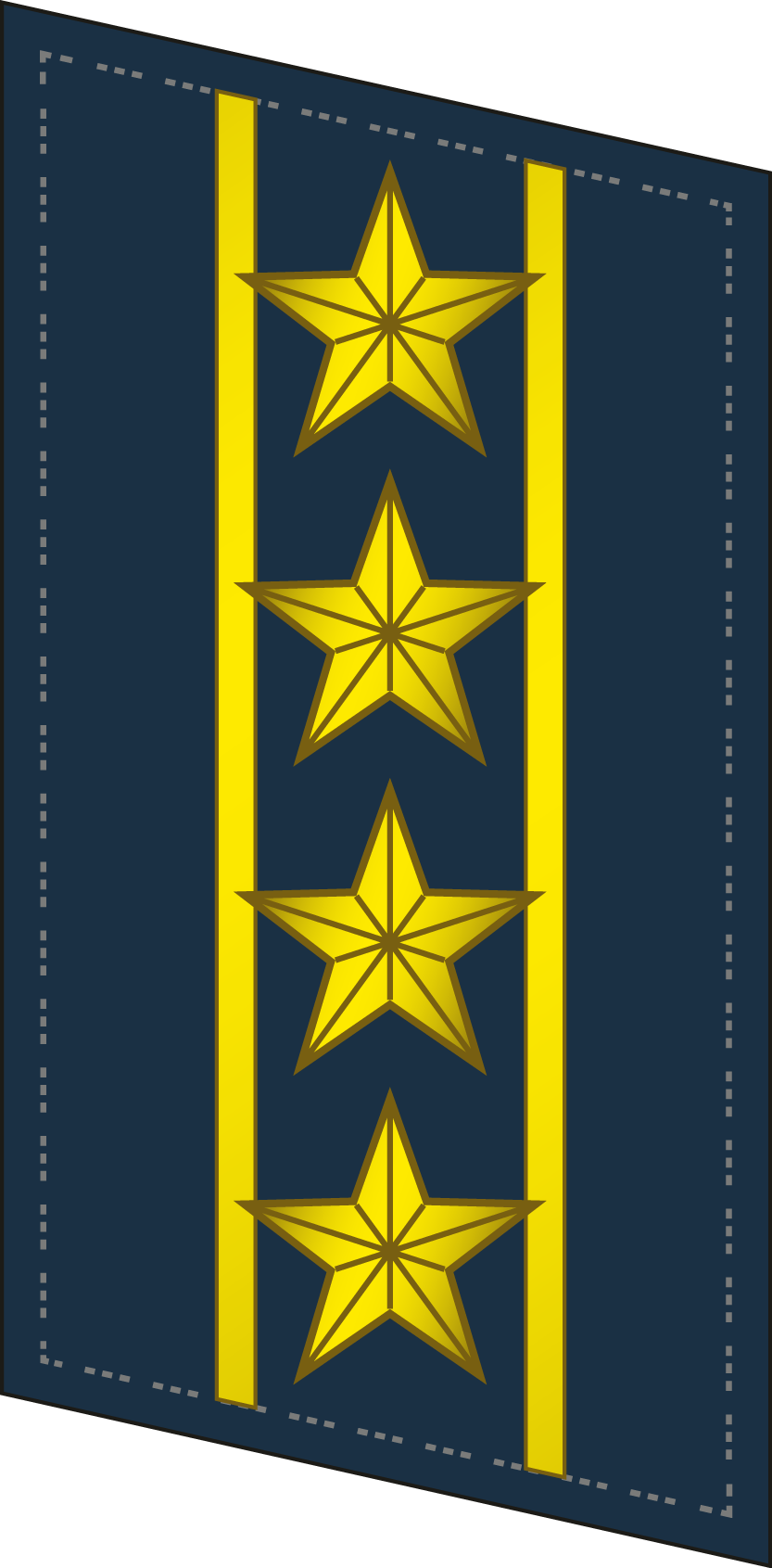
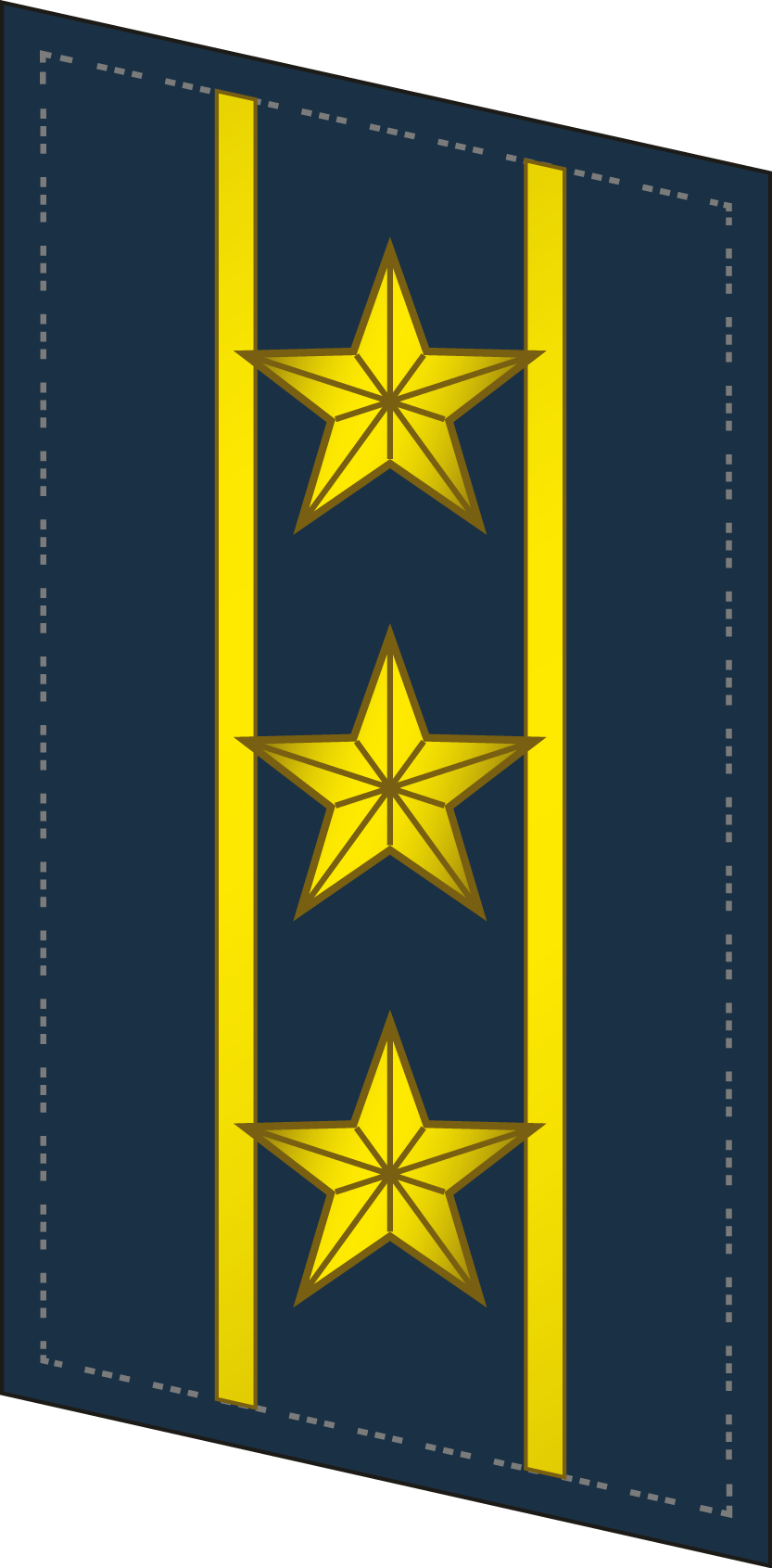
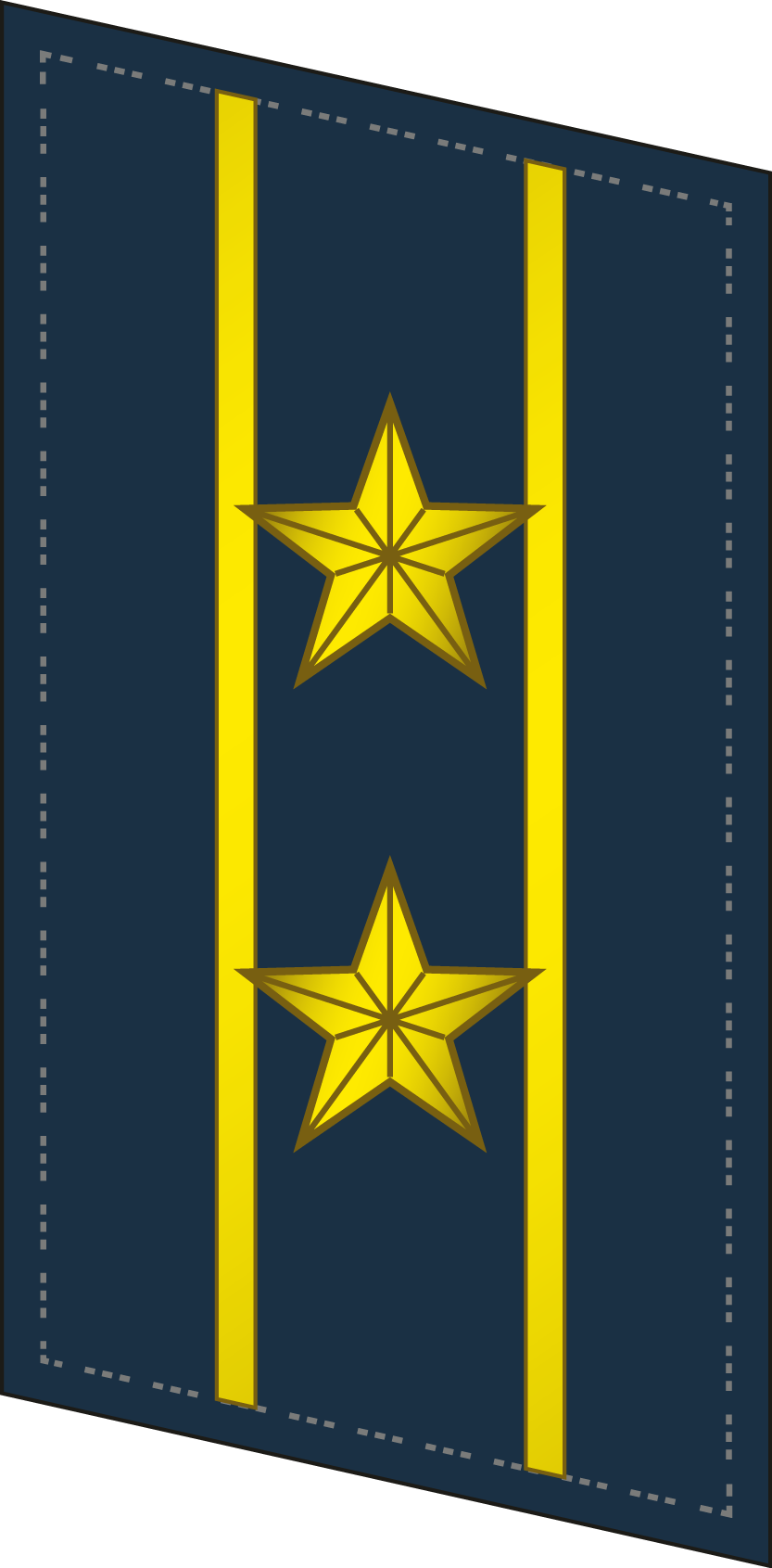
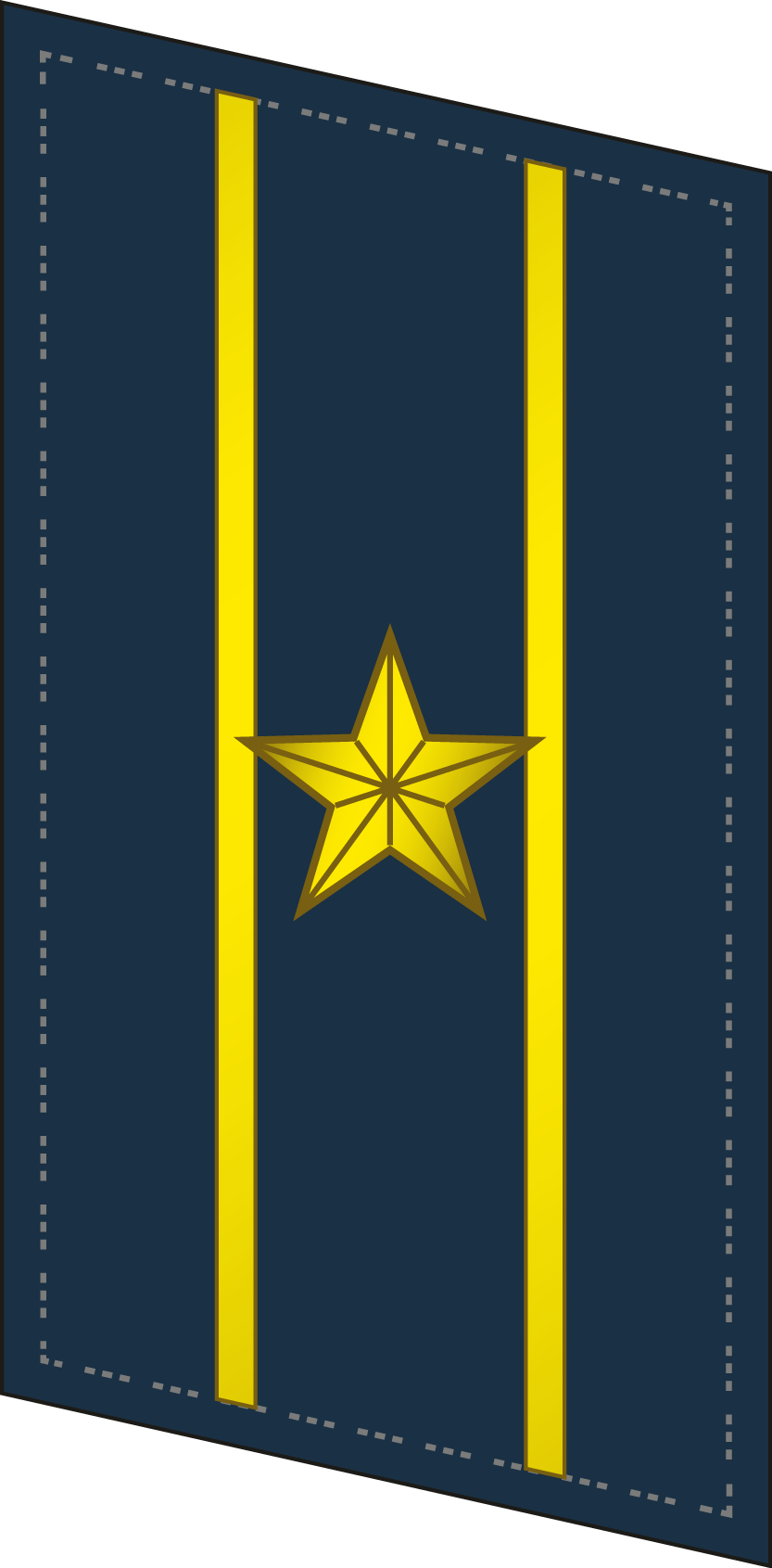
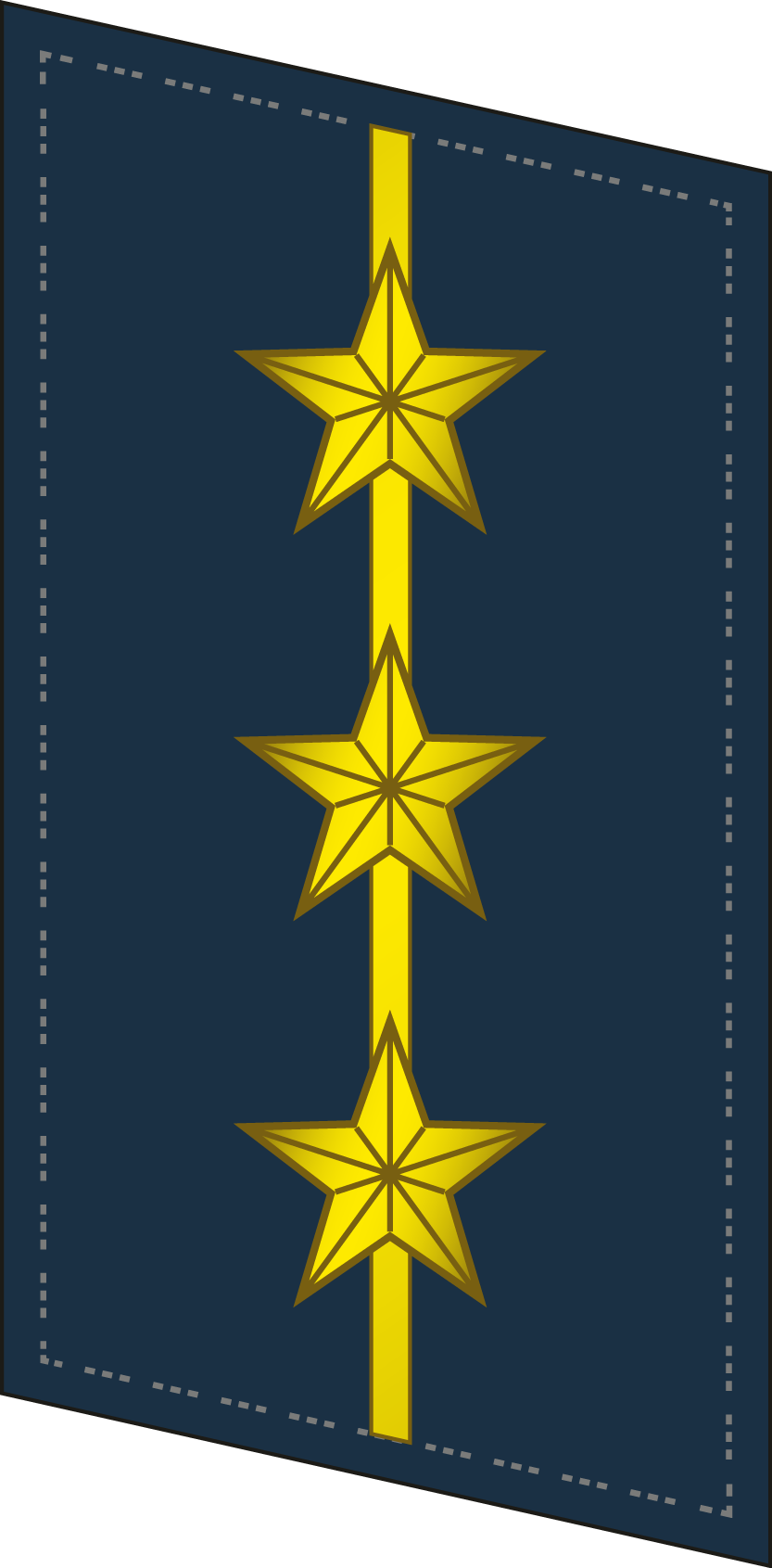
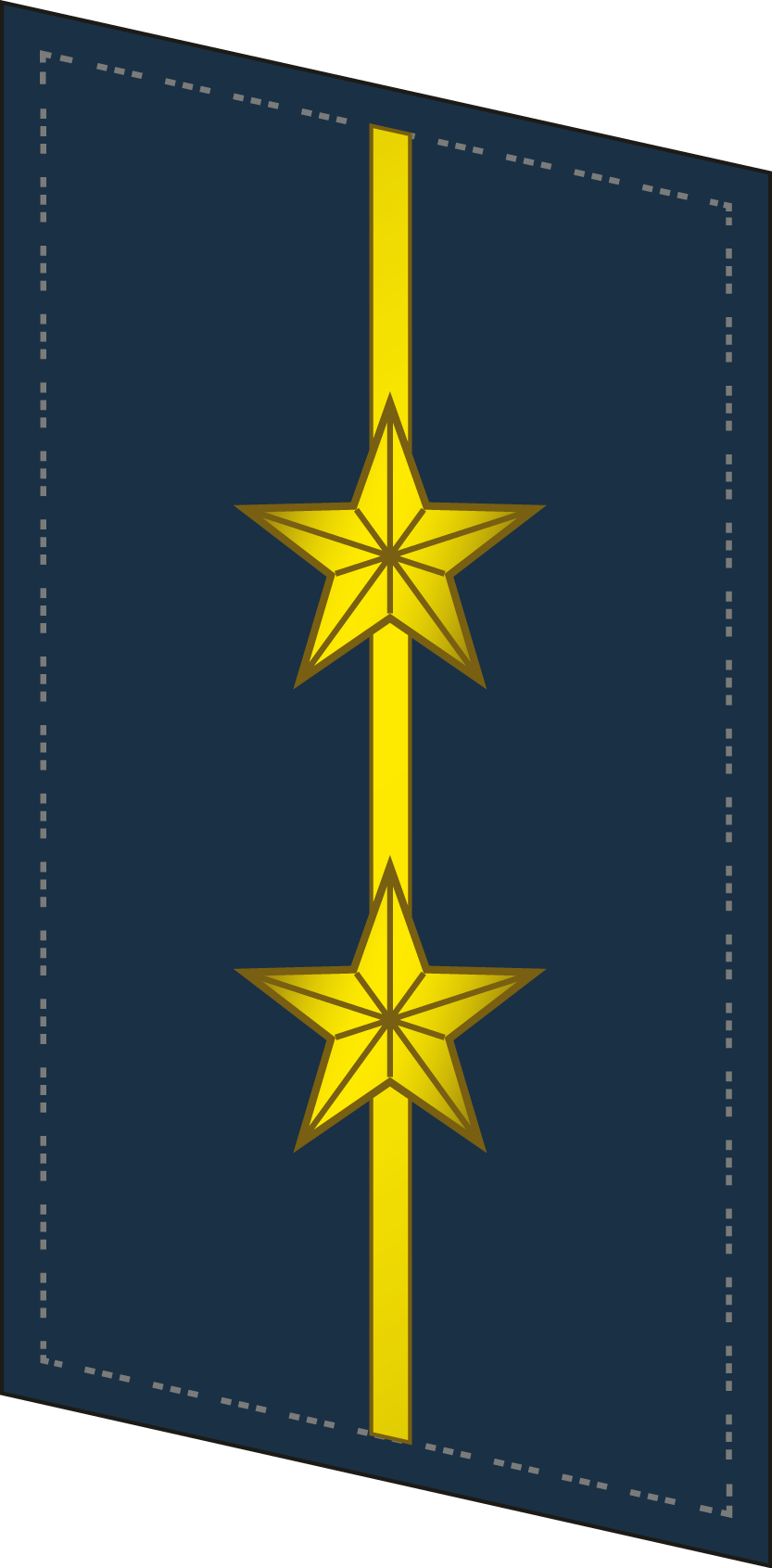
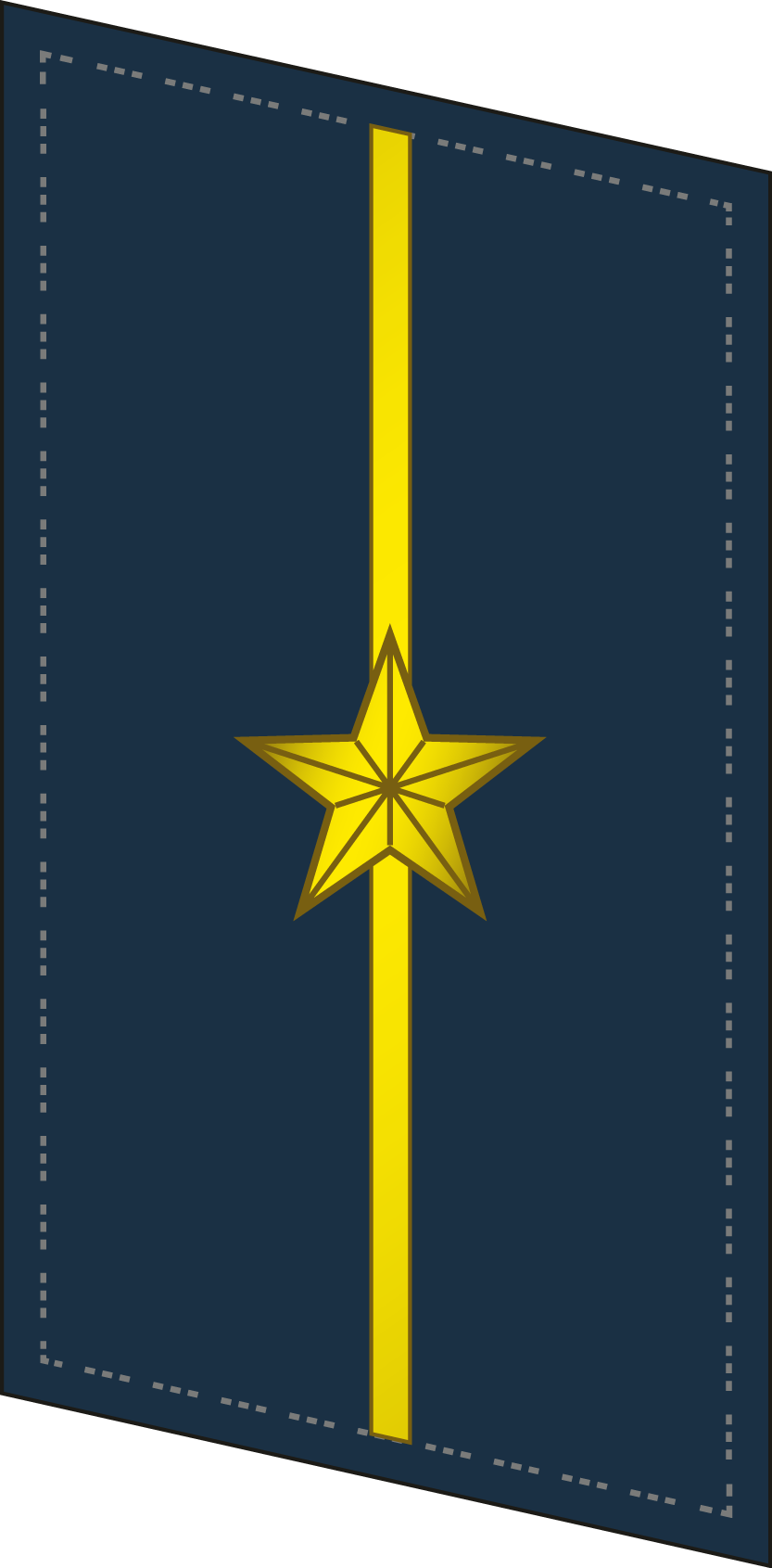
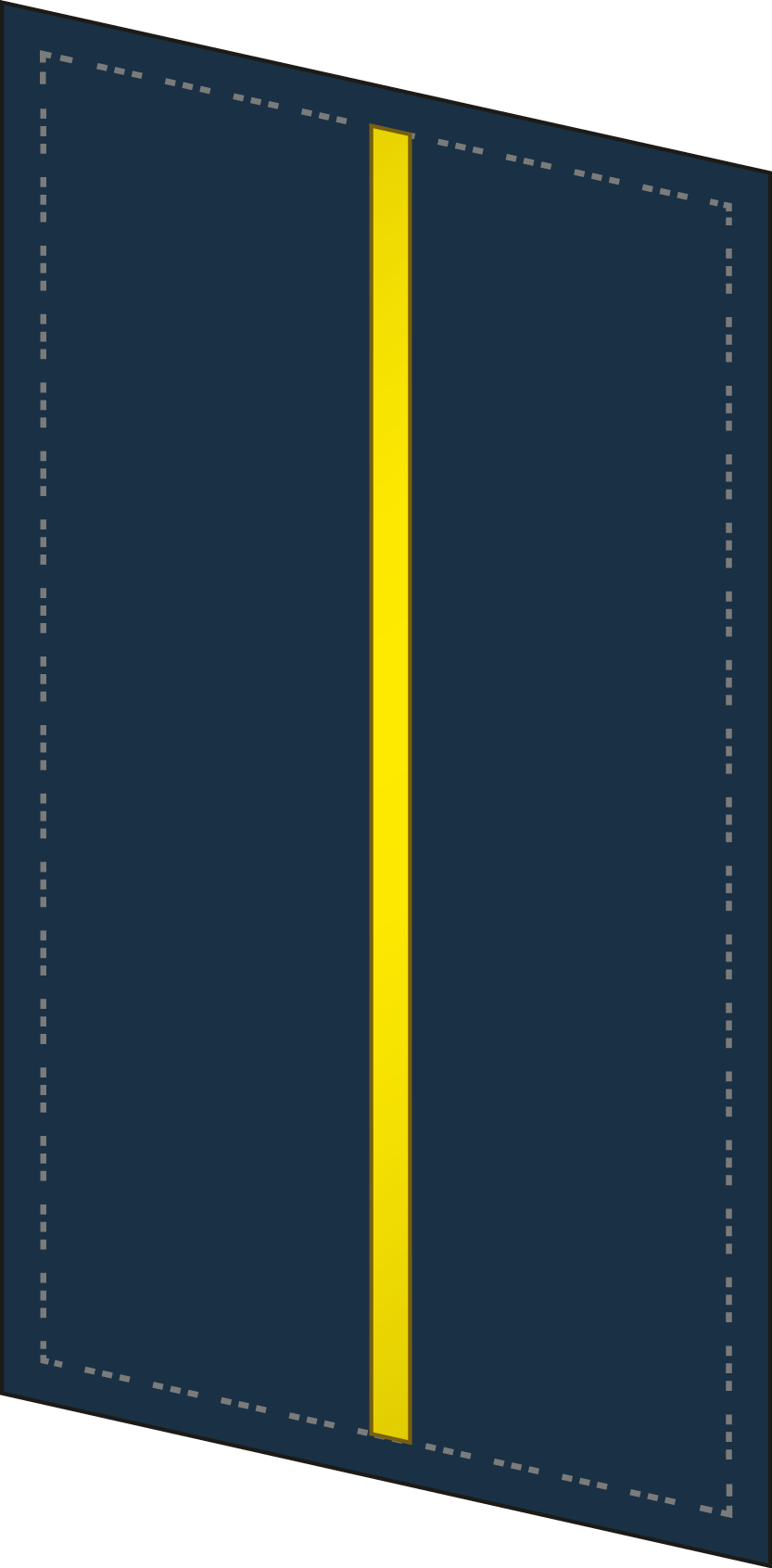
Title	空军上将 Kōngjūn shang jiang	空军中将 Kōngjūn zhong jiang	空军少将 Kōngjūn shao jiang	空军大校 Kōngjūn da xiao	空军上校 Kōngjūn shang xiao	空军中校 Kōngjūn zhong xiao	空军少校 Kōngjūn shao xiao	空军上尉 Kōngjūn shang wei	空军中尉 Kōngjūn zhong wei	空军少尉 Kōngjūn shao wei	空军学员 Kōngjūn xue yuan
Equivalent translation	General	Lieutenant general	Major general	Senior colonel	Colonel	Lieutenant colonel	Major	Captain	First lieutenant	Second lieutenant	Officer cadet
Shoulder insignia
Collar insignia

=== Ranks of enlisted personnel ===
The current system of enlisted ranks and insignia dates from 2022.

Unlike NATO countries, new recruits of the People's Liberation Army have no military ranks before the boot camp is completed, and they will be awarded the rank of Private/Seaman Apprentice/Airman (All collectively called "Private" or "Lie Bing" in the Chinese language) after they have graduated from the boot camp. According to Article 16 of Chapter 3 of the "Regulations on the Service of Active Soldiers of the Chinese People's Liberation Army" (Chinese: 中国人民解放军现役士兵服役条例), "The lowest enlisted rank is Private".

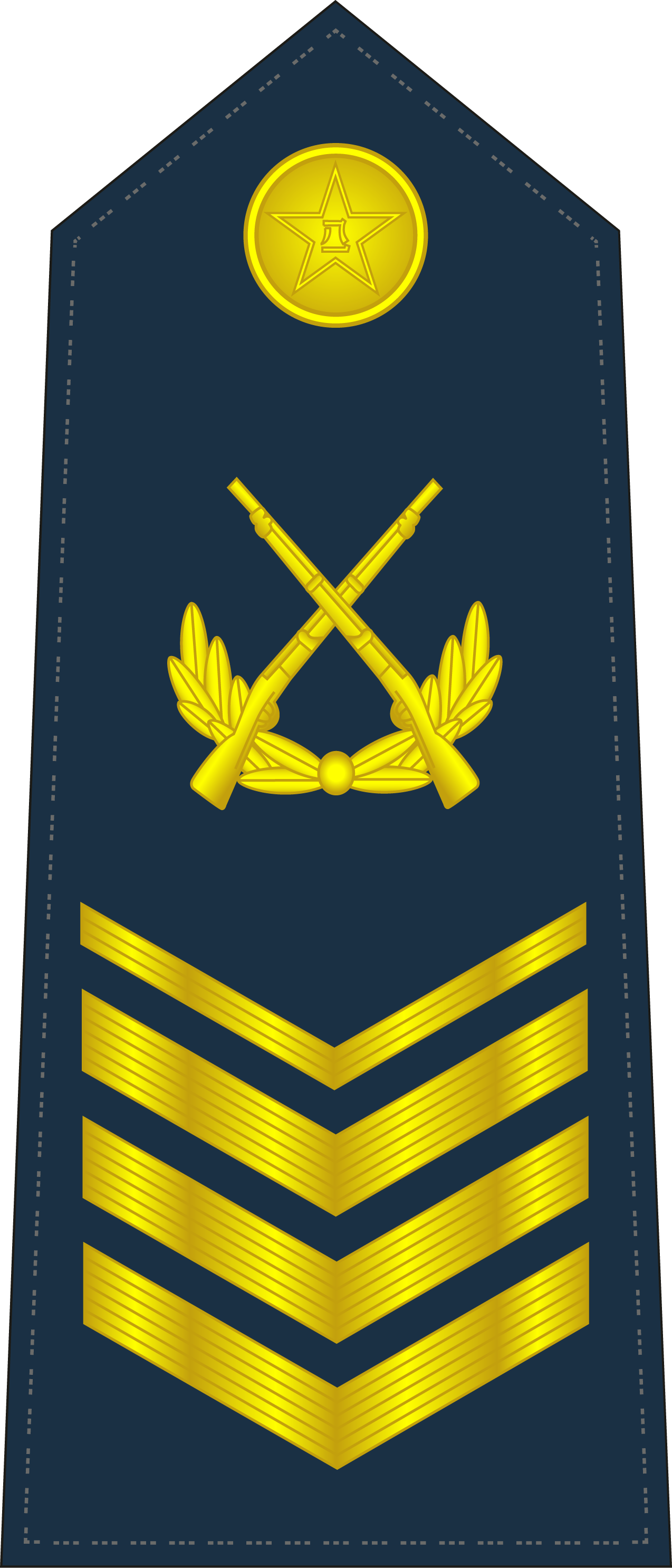
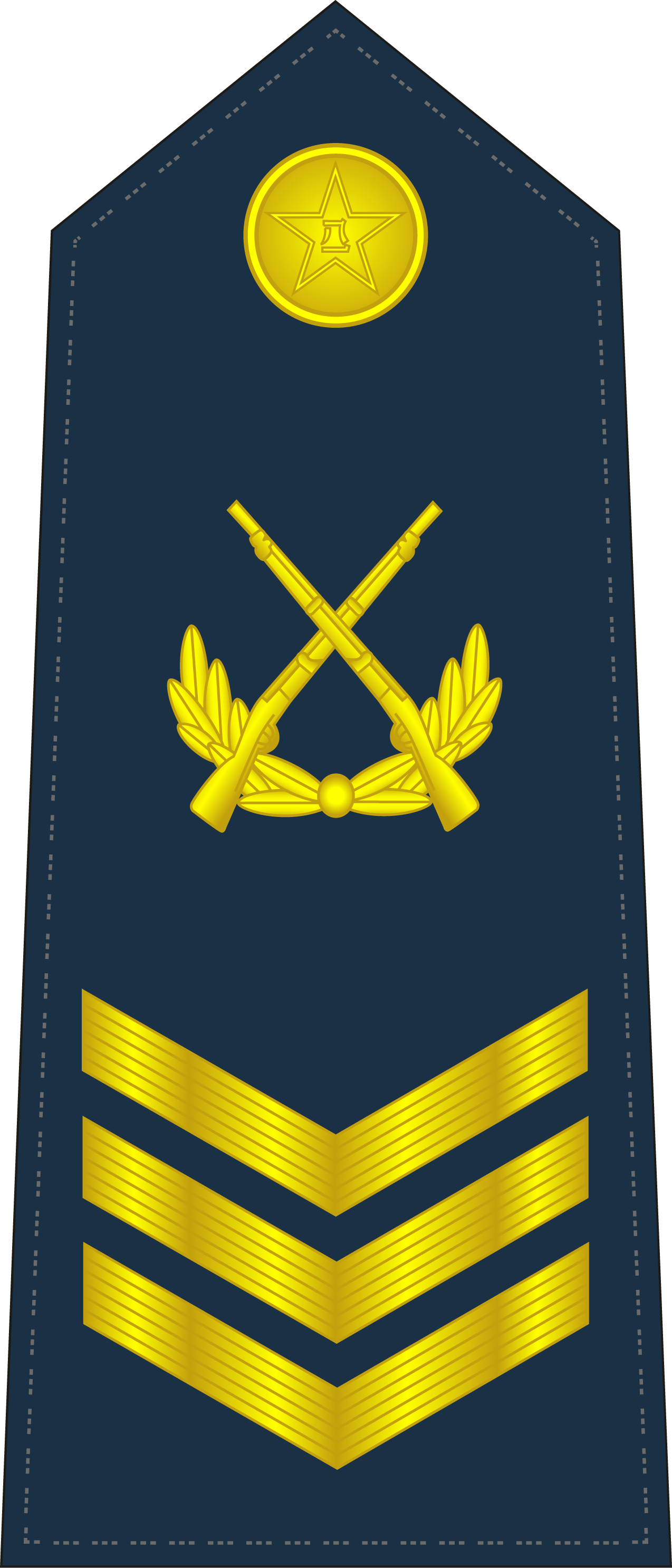
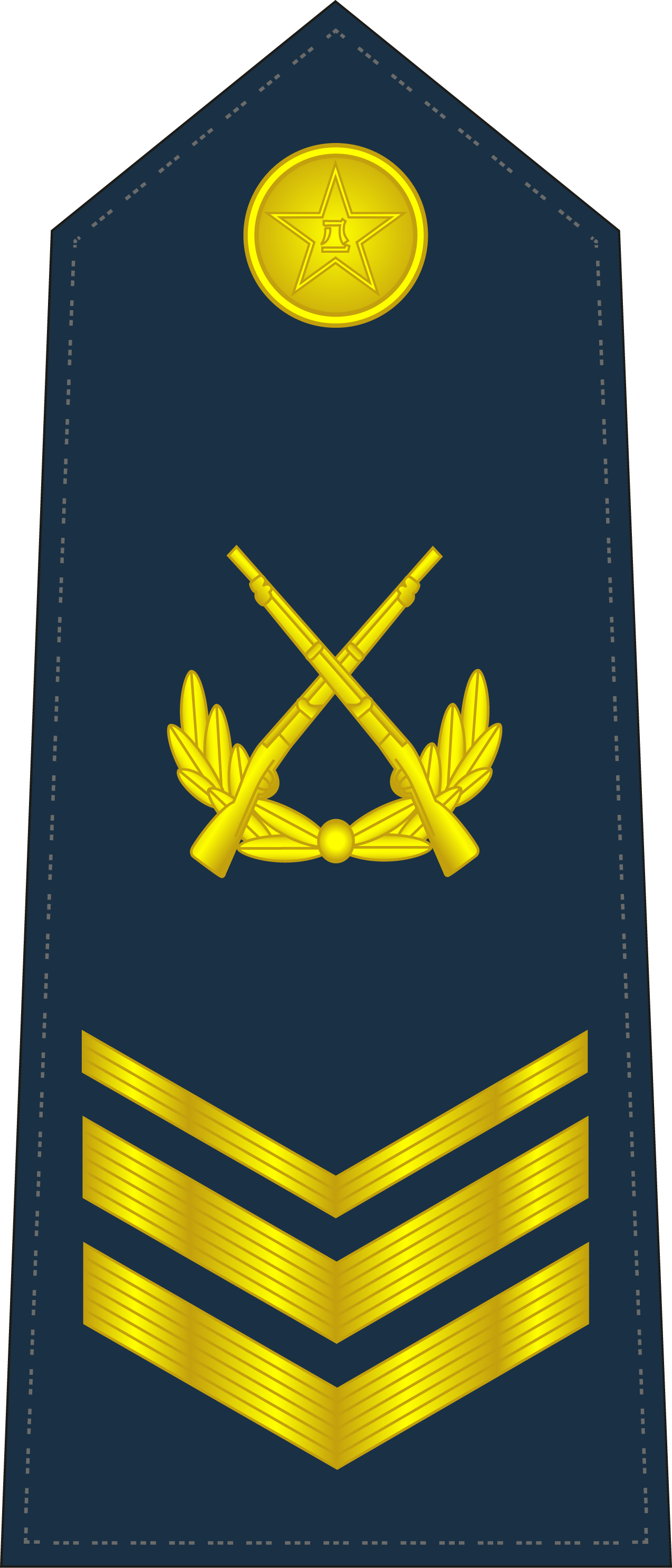
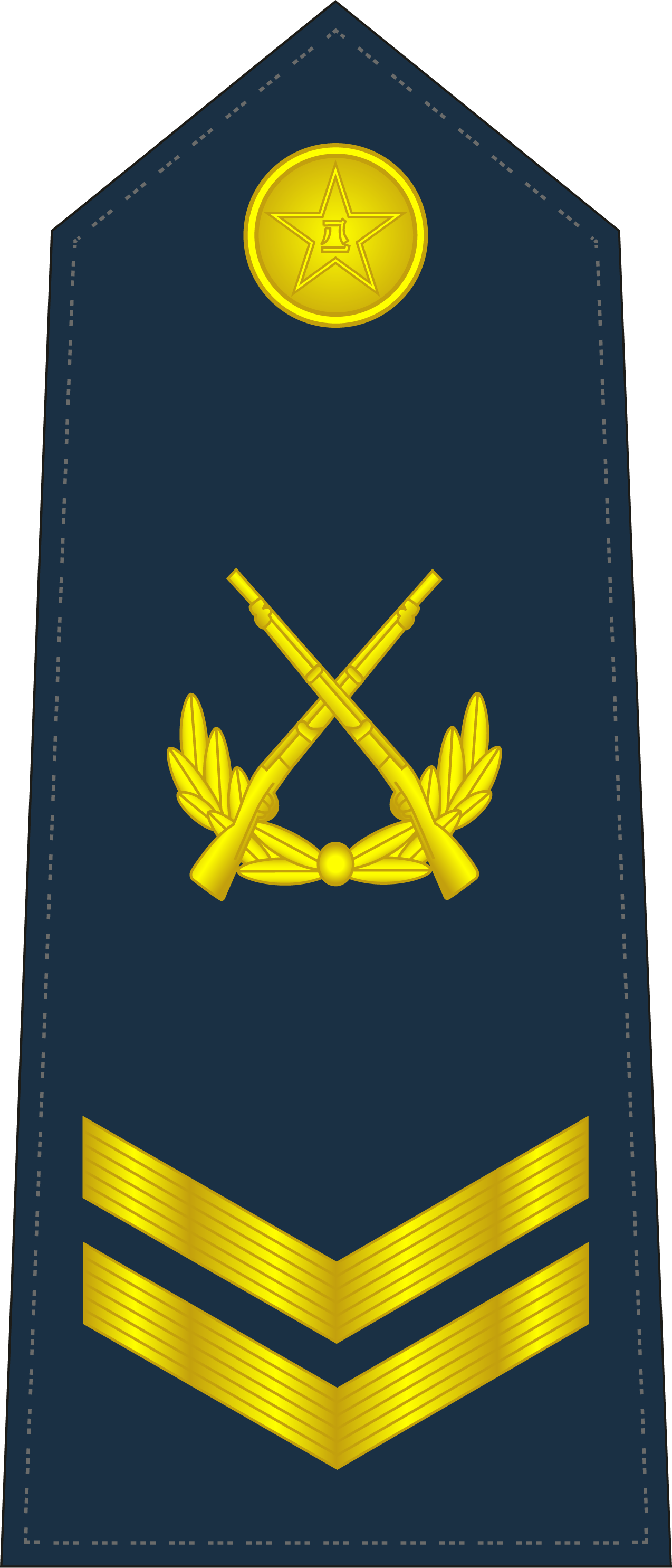
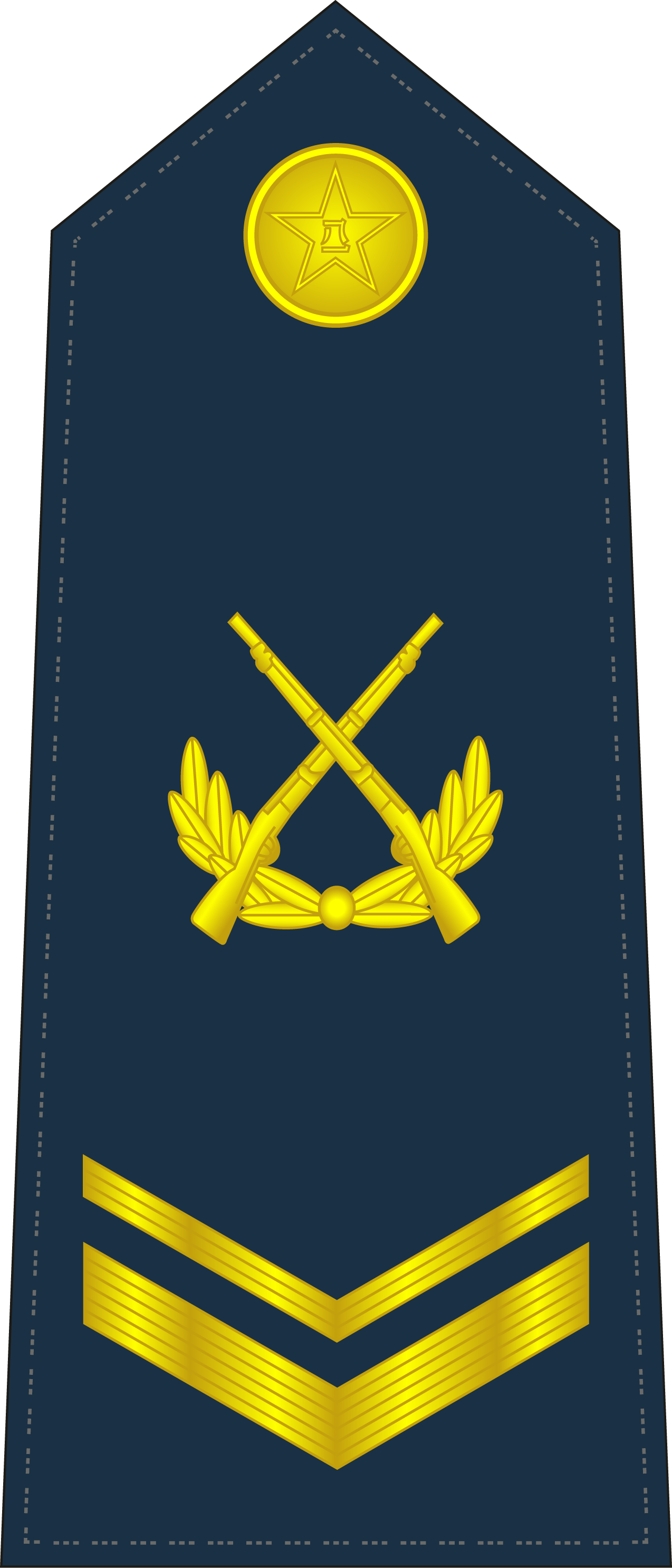
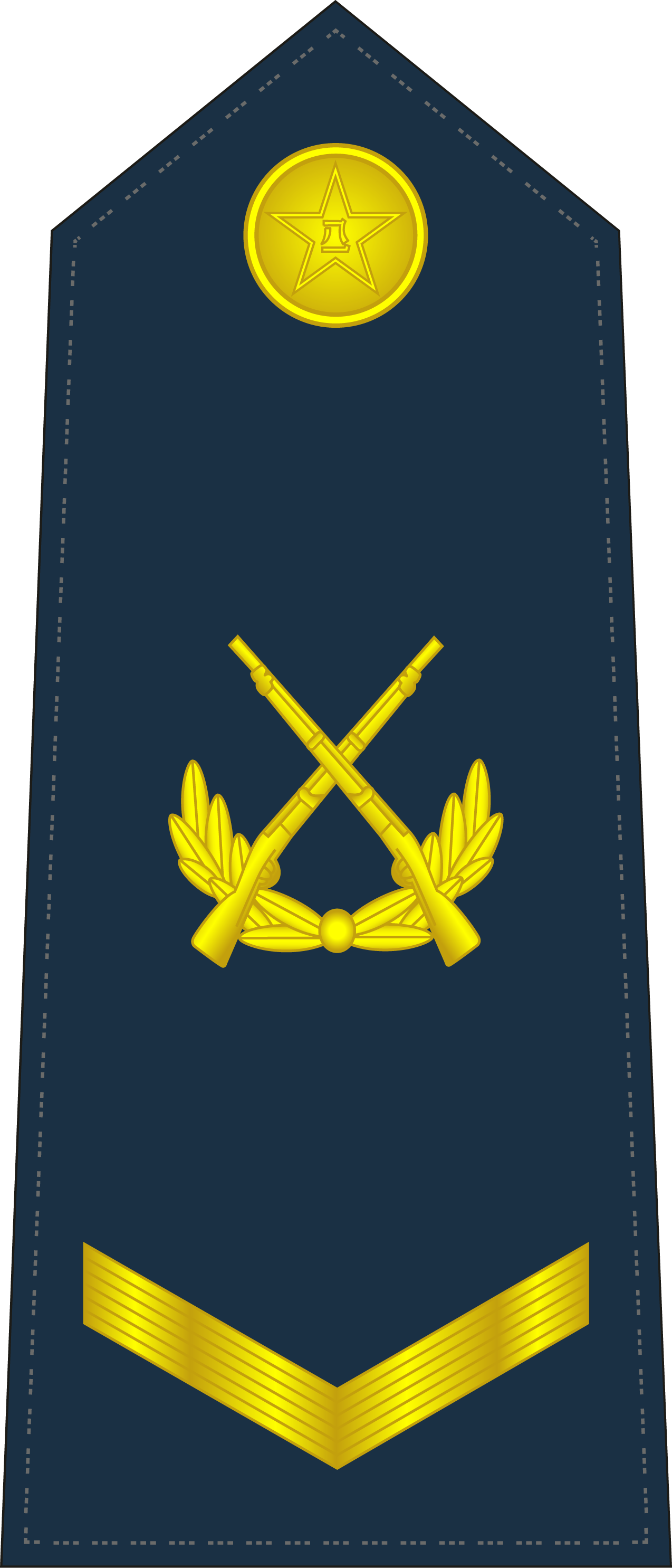
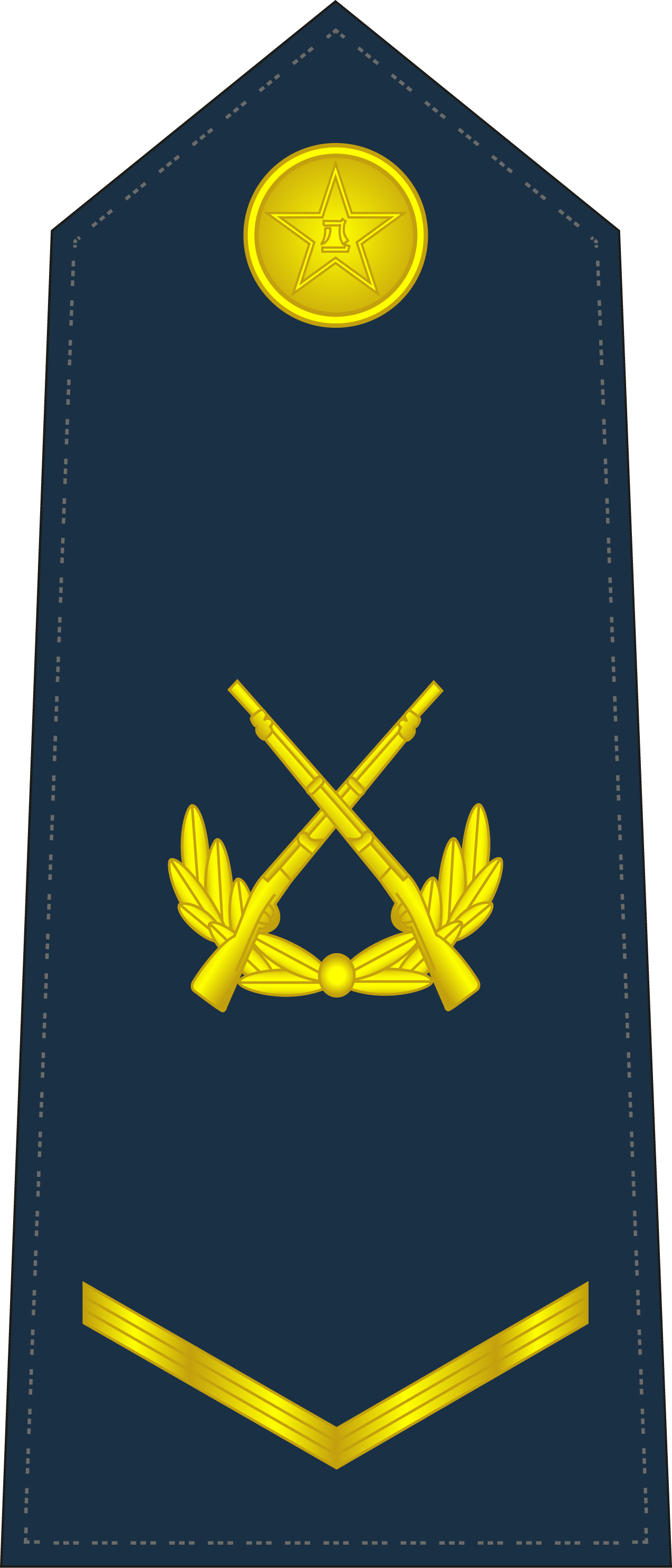
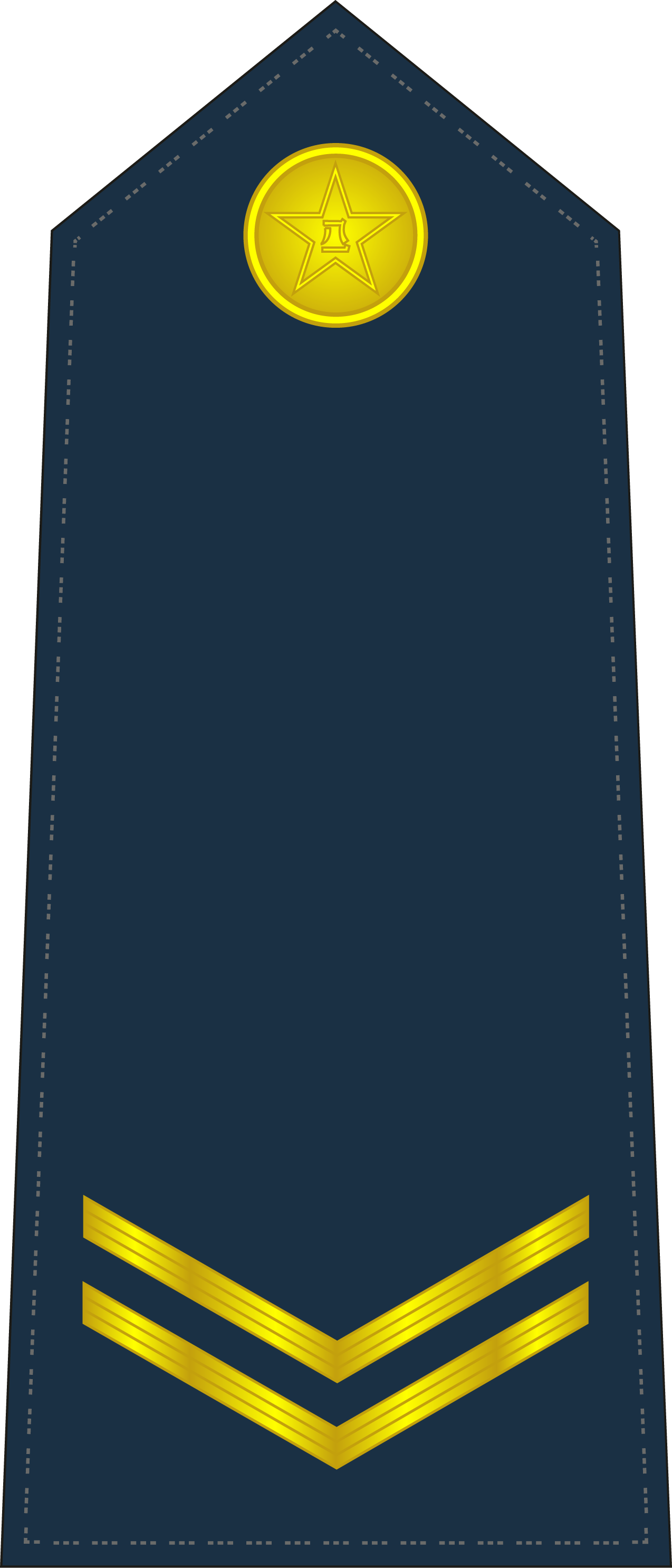
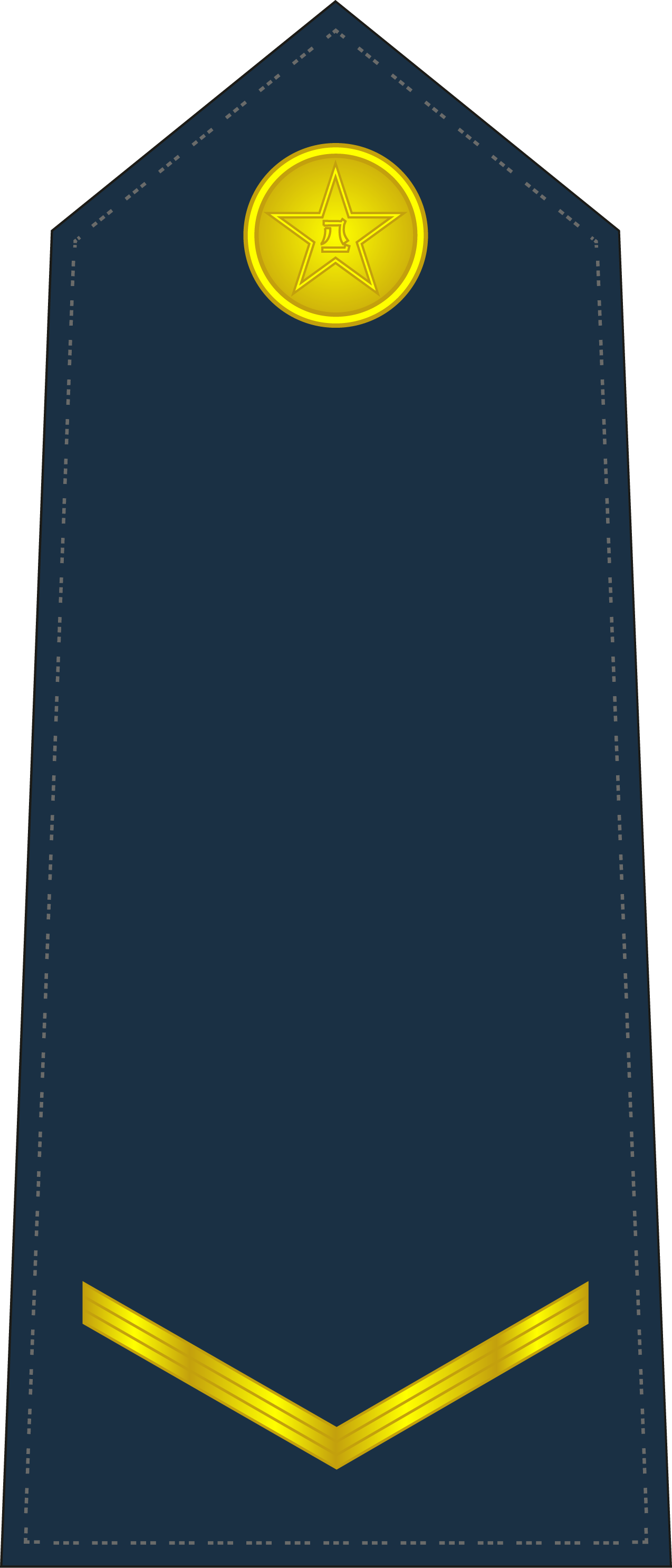
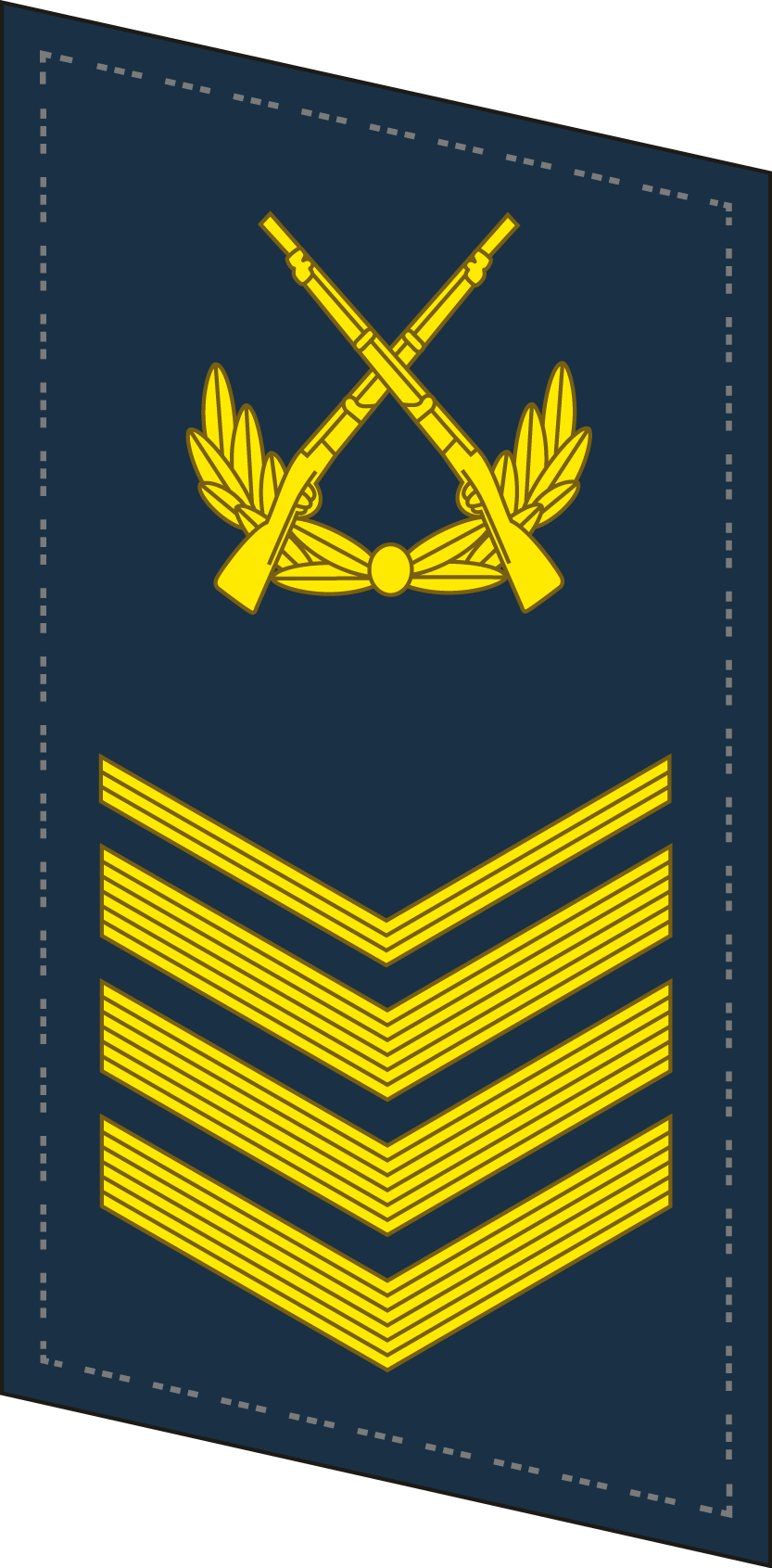
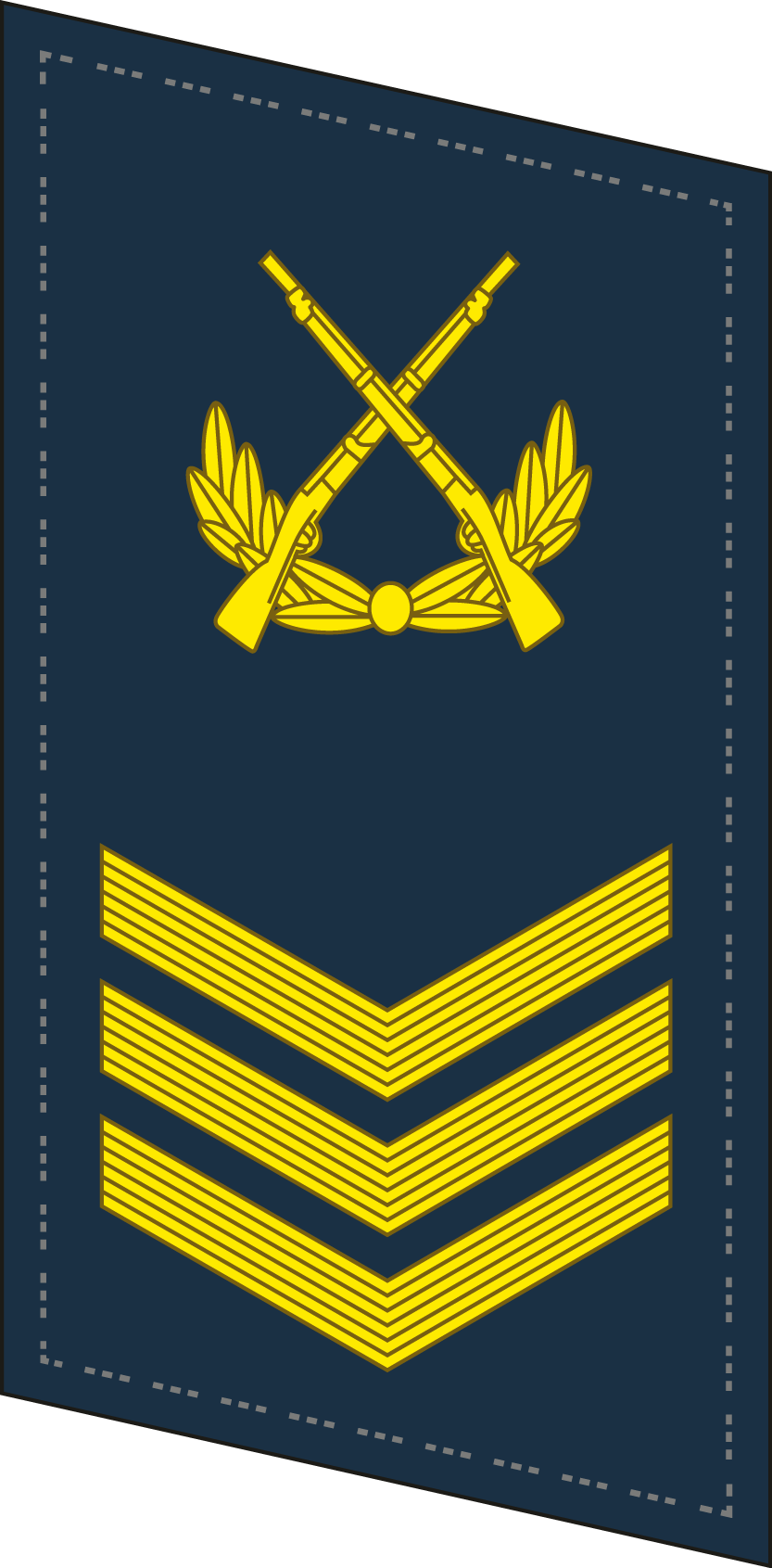
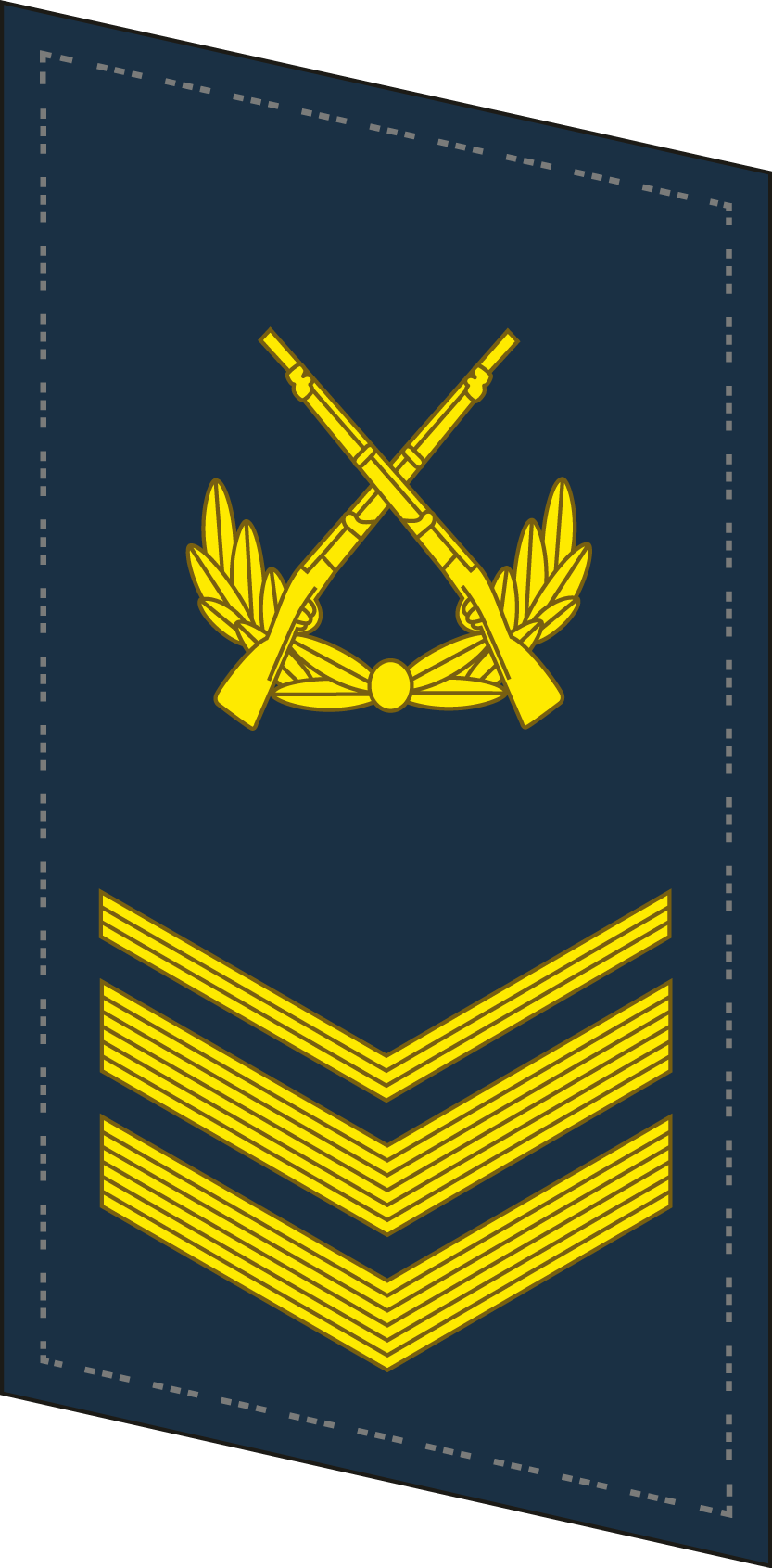
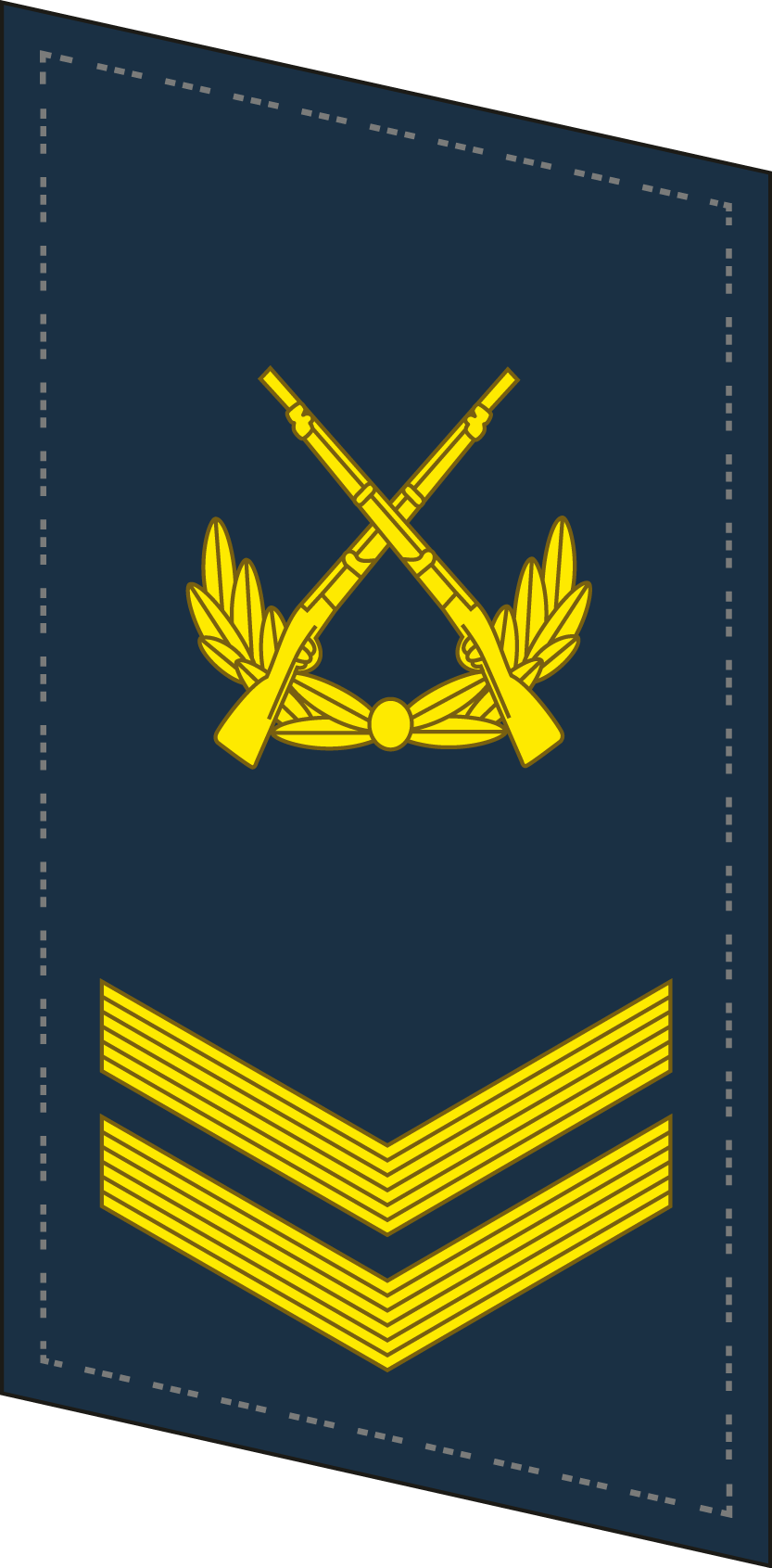
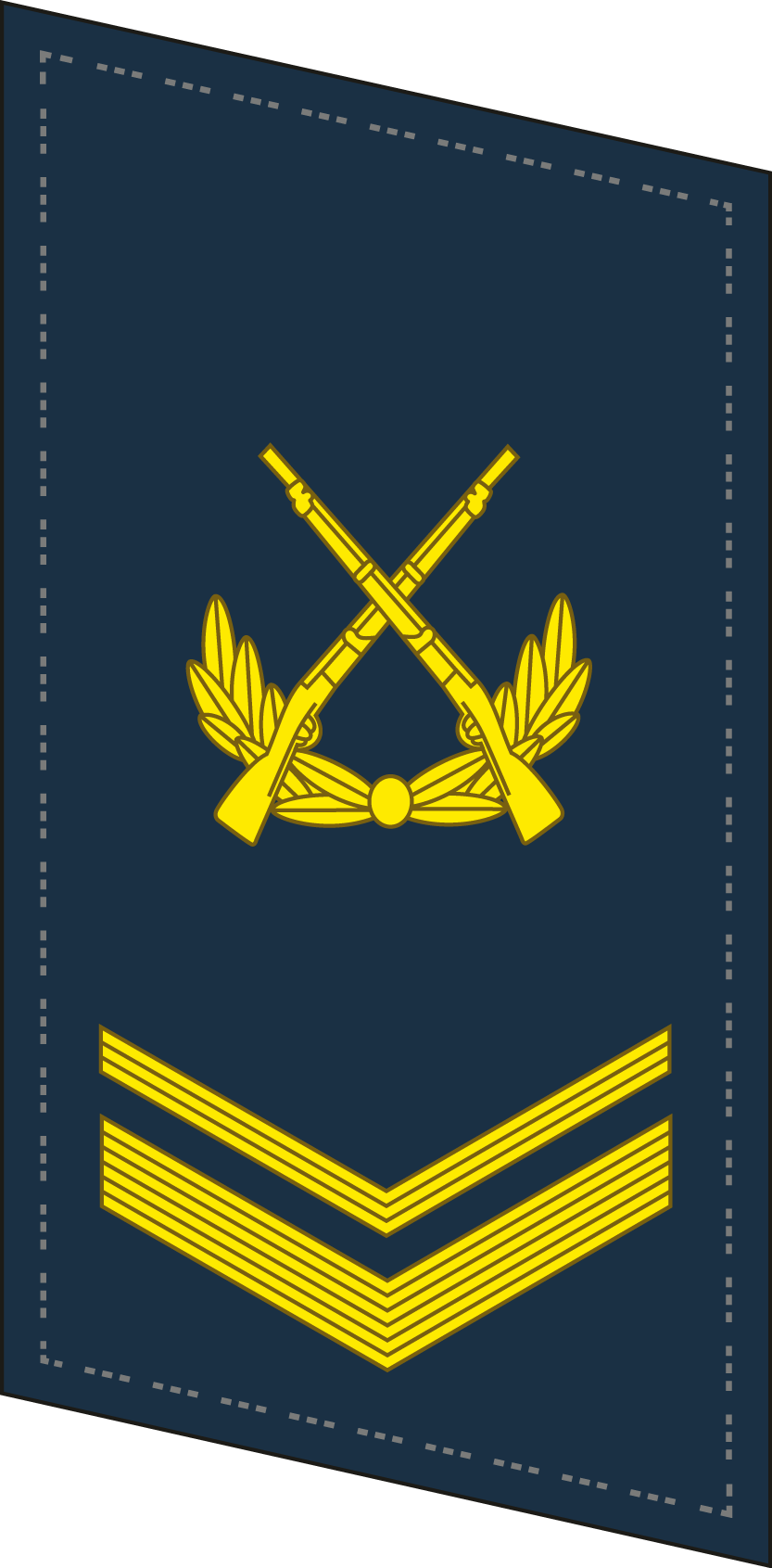
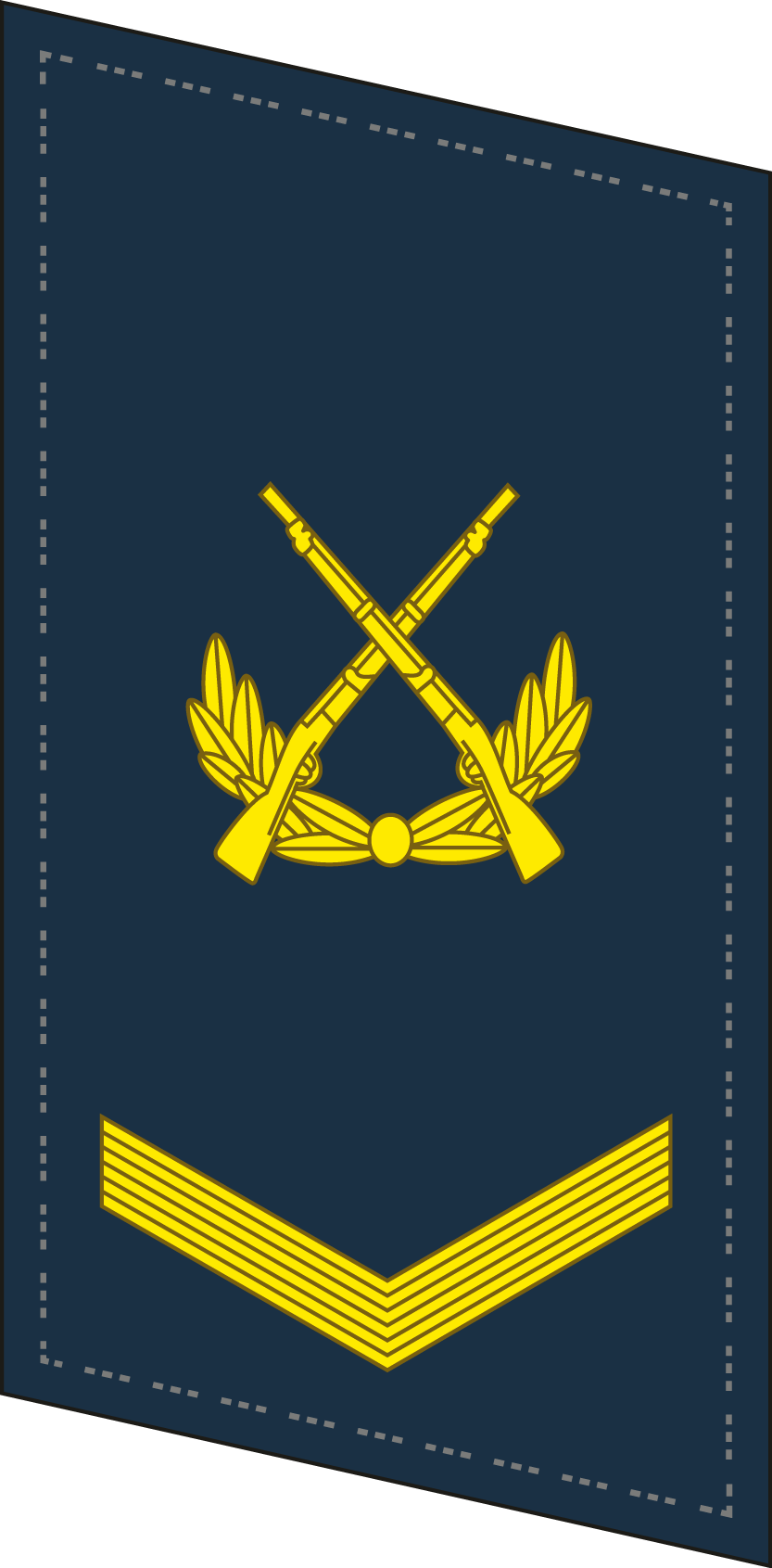
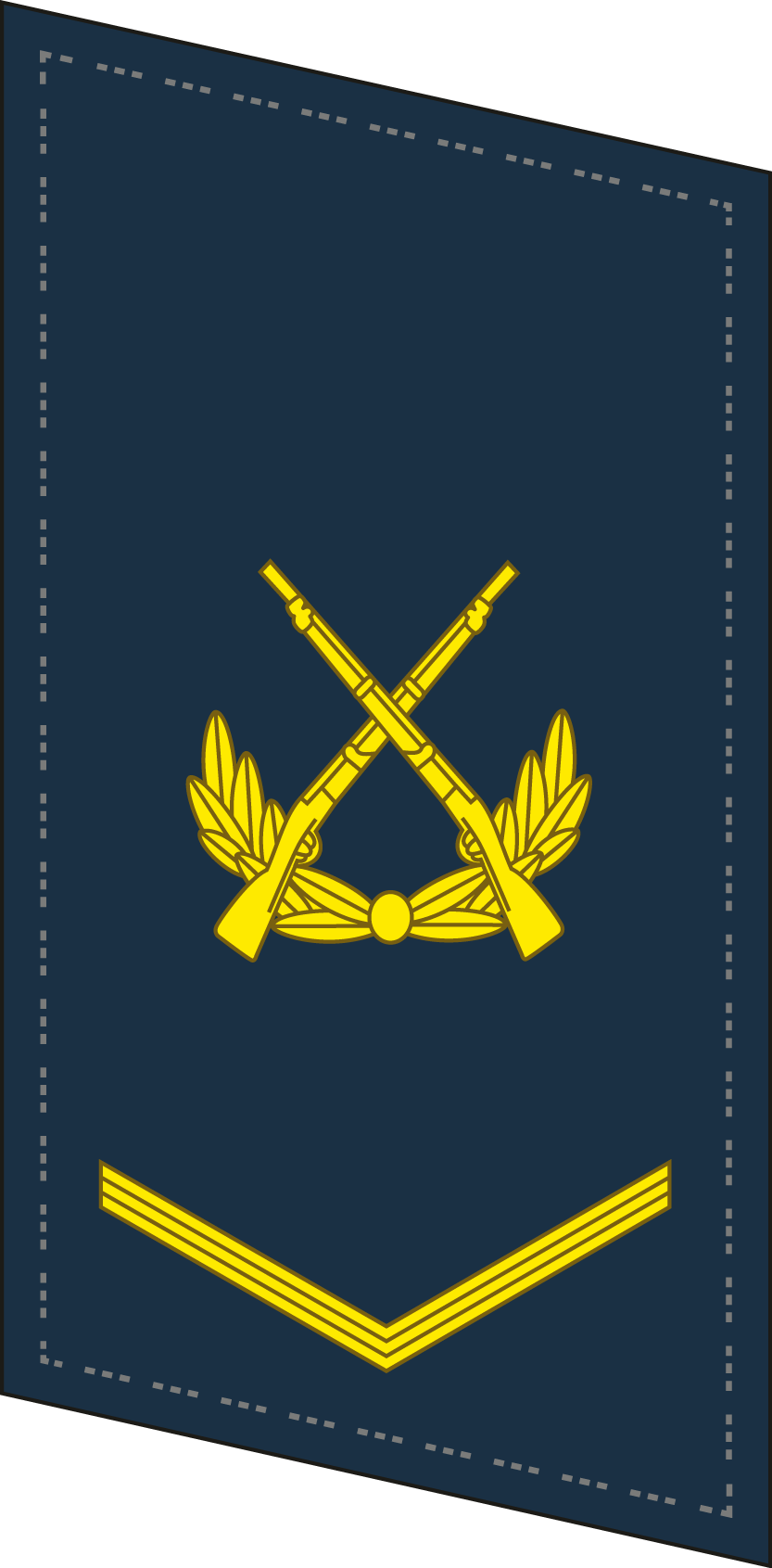
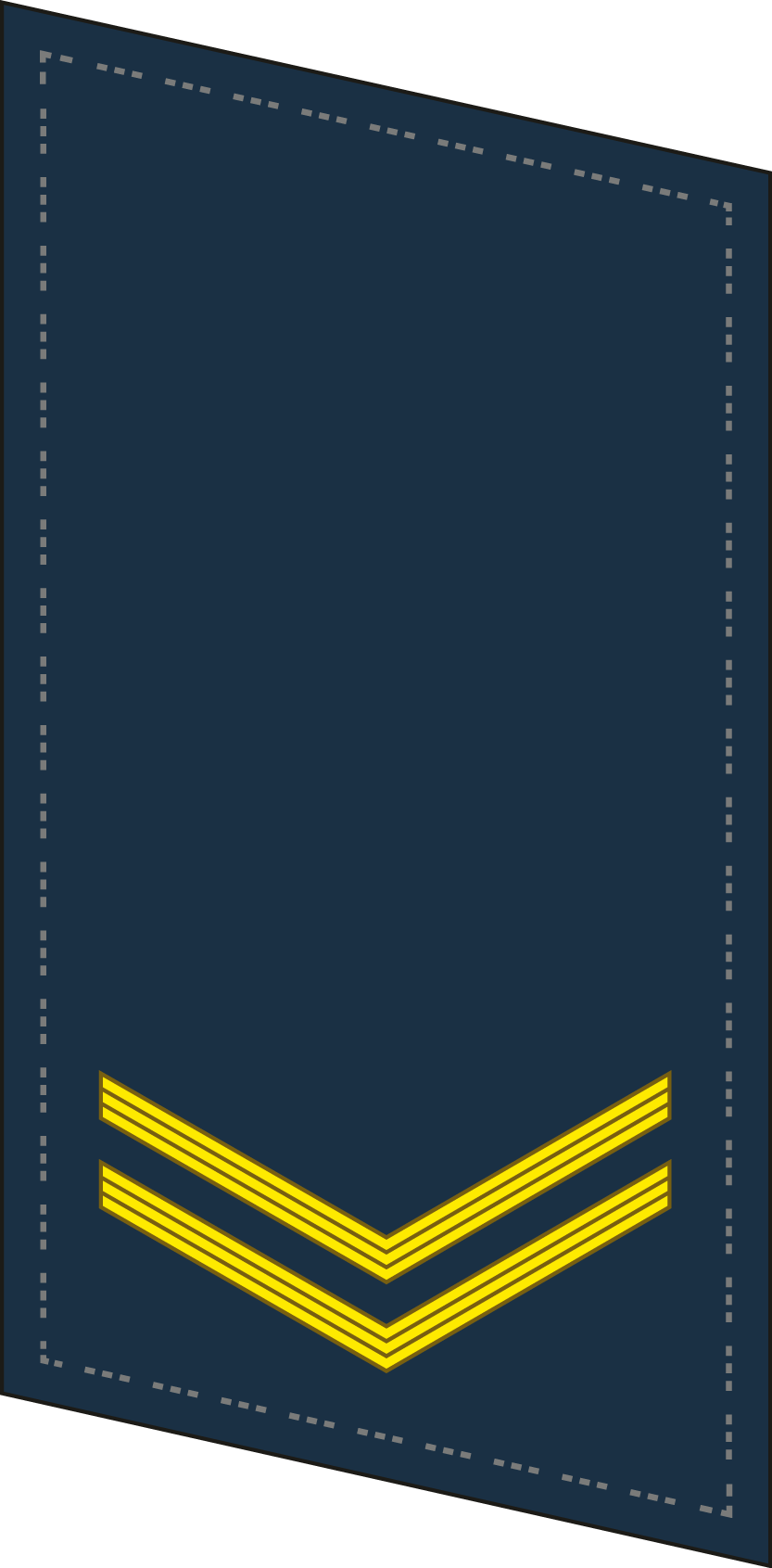
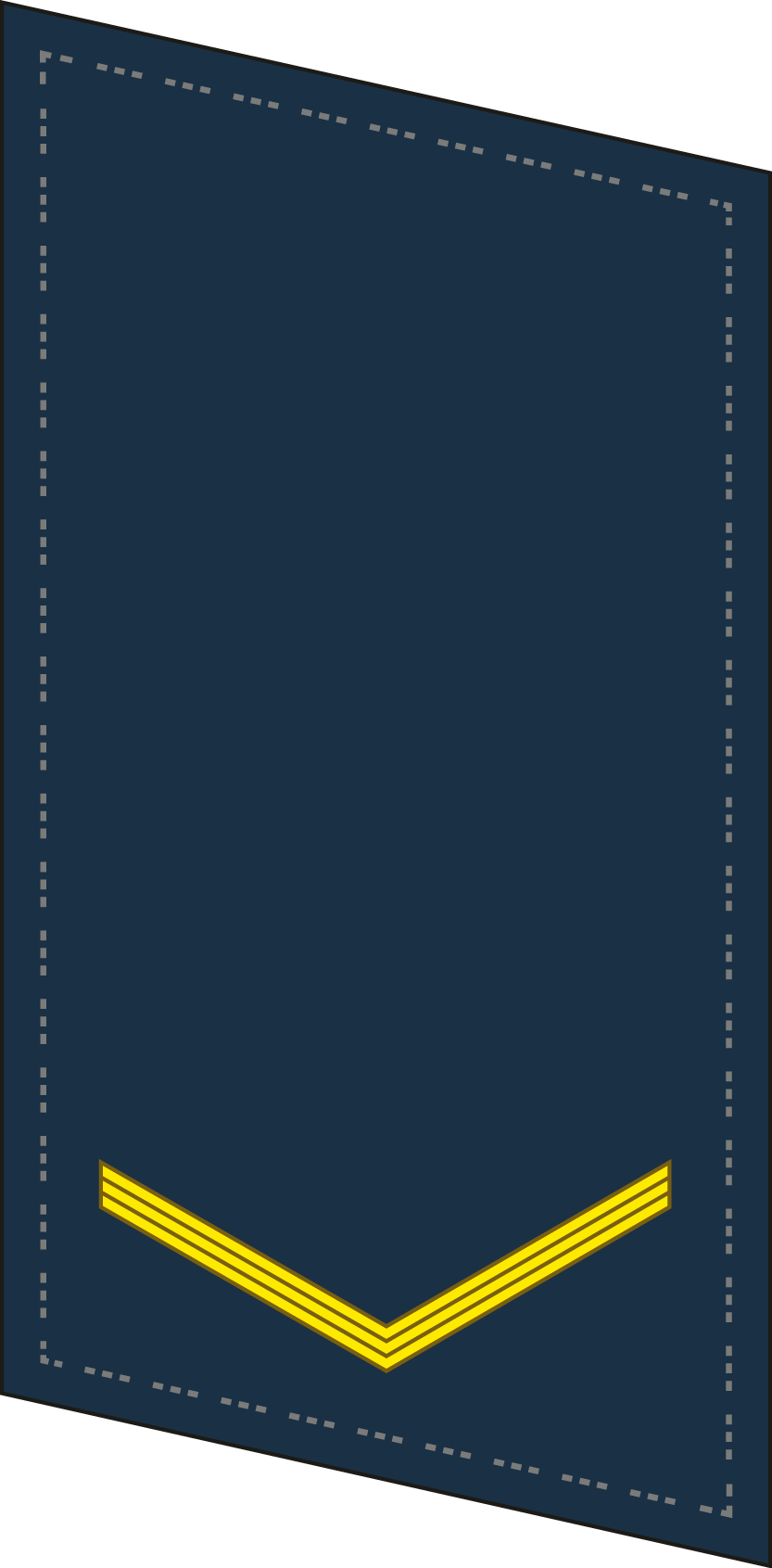
Title	空军一级军士长 Kōngjūn yi ji jun shi zhang	空军二级军士长 Kōngjūn er ji jun shi zhang	空军三级军士长 Kōngjūn san ji jun shi zhang	一级上士 Kōngjūn yi ji shang shi	二级上士 Kōngjūn er ji junshi zhang	空军中士 Kōngjūn zhong shi	空军下士 Kōngjūn xia shi	空军上等兵 Kōngjūn shang deng bing	空军列兵 Kōngjūn lie bing
Equivalent translation	Master sergeant first class	Master sergeant second class	Master sergeant third class	Technical sergeant	Staff sergeant	Sergeant	Corporal	Airman first class	Airman
Shoulder insignia
Collar insignia

=== Civilian cadre badges ===
The current PLA Air Force 07-style uniform has special provisions for the epaulettes of non-combat troops, that is, civilian cadres, guards of honor, and military bands. Among them, the badge of the guard of honor shown in the figure was abolished in 2014.

Category	Civilian cadres		Guard of honor	Military band	Art Troupe
Epaulette	Civilian cadre Professional technical level 3 (deputy military post) or above	Civilian cadre Professional technical level 4 or less (regular post)			文工团
Epaulette	Civilian cadre Professional technical level 3 (deputy military post) or above	Civilian cadre Professional technical level 4 or less (regular post)	Honor Guard	Military Band	Art Troupe

== Historical rank insignia ==
Officer ranks

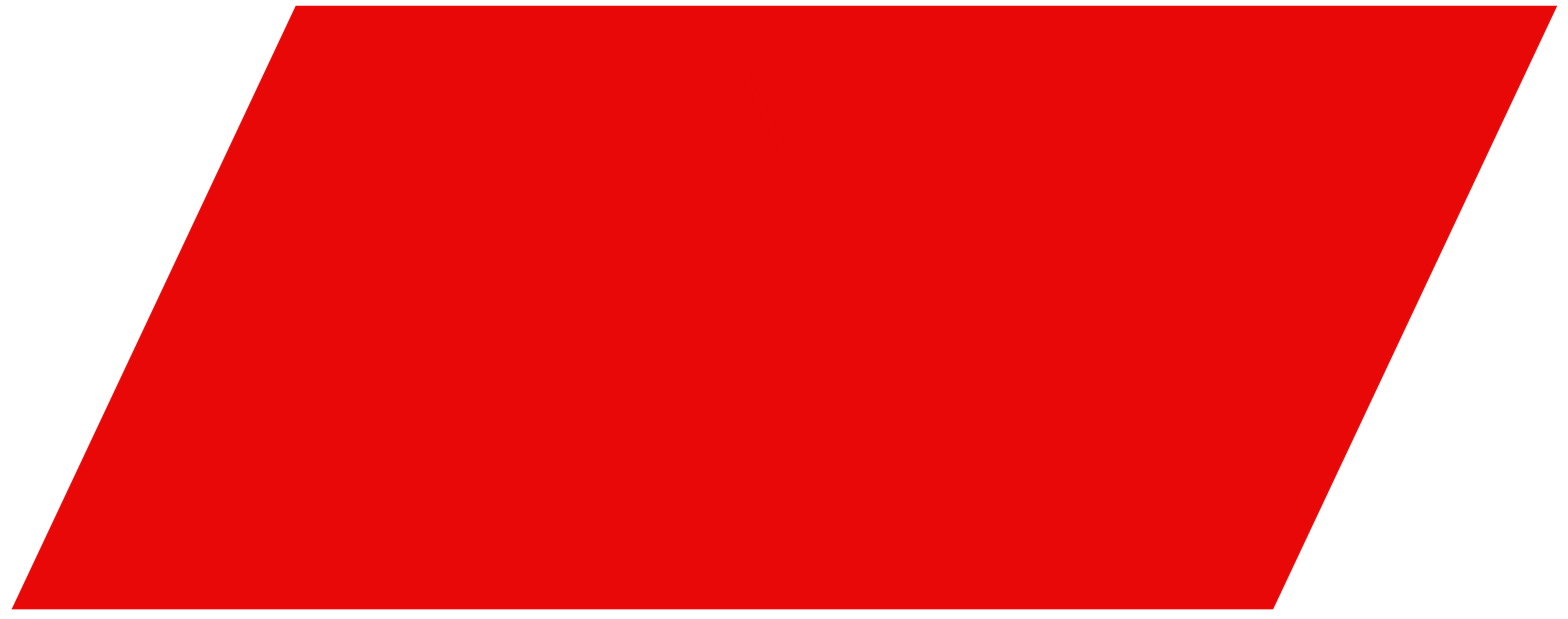
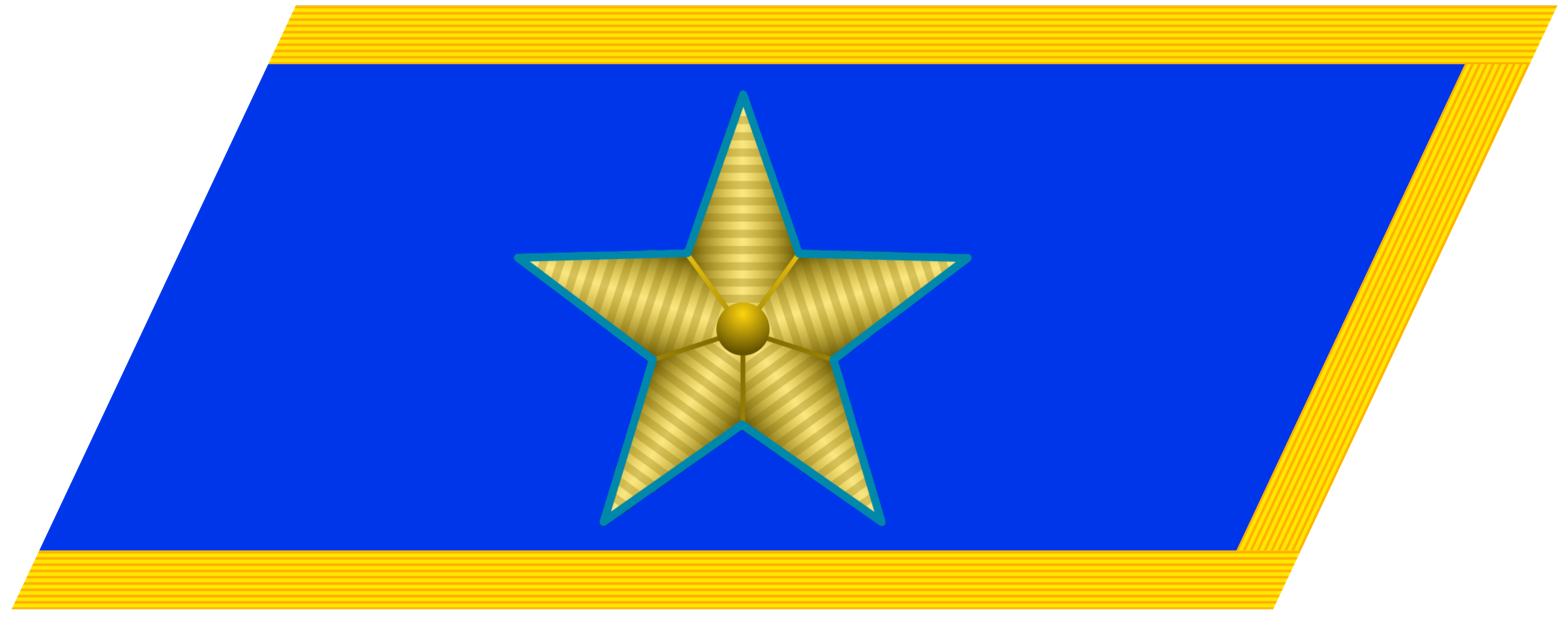
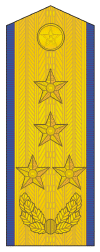
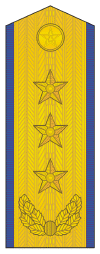
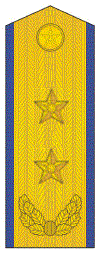
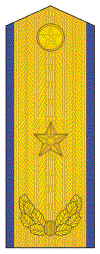
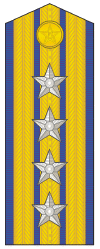
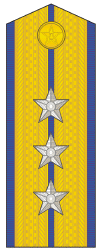
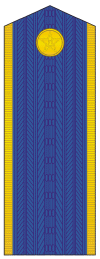
Rank group	General / flag officers				Senior officers				Junior officers
PLA Air Force (1955–1965)
PLA Air Force (1955–1965)	空军大将; Kōngjūn Dà jiàng	空军上将; Kōngjūn shàngjiàng	空军中将; Kōngjūn zhōngjiàng	空军少将; Kōngjūn shàojiàng	空军大校; Kōngjūn dàxiào	空军上校; Kōngjūn shàngxiào	空军中校; Kōngjūn zhōngxiào	空军少校; Kōngjūn shàoxiào	空军大尉; Kōngjūn dàwèi	空军上尉; Kōngjūn shàngwèi	空军中尉; Kōngjūn zhōngwèi	空军少尉; Kōngjūn shàowèi	空军准尉; Kōngjūn zhǔnwèi
No ranks (1965–1985)
No ranks (1985–1988)
PLA Air Force (1988–1994)	空军大将	空军上将	空军中校	空军少校	空军大校	空军上校	空军中校	空军少校	空军上尉		空军中尉	空军少尉	空军准尉
PLA Air Force (1988–1994)	空军一级上将; Kōngjūn yī jí shàng jiàng	空军上将; Kōngjūn shàngjiàng	空军中将; Kōngjūn zhōngjiàng	空军少将; Kōngjūn shàojiàng	空军大校; Kōngjūn dàxiào	空军上校; Kōngjūn shàngxiào	空军中校; Kōngjūn zhōngxiào	空军少校; Kōngjūn shàoxiào	空军上尉; Kōngjūn shàngwèi		空军中尉; Kōngjūn zhōngwèi	空军少尉; Kōngjūn shàowèi	空军学员; Kōngjūn xueyuan

=== Enlisted and NCOs ===
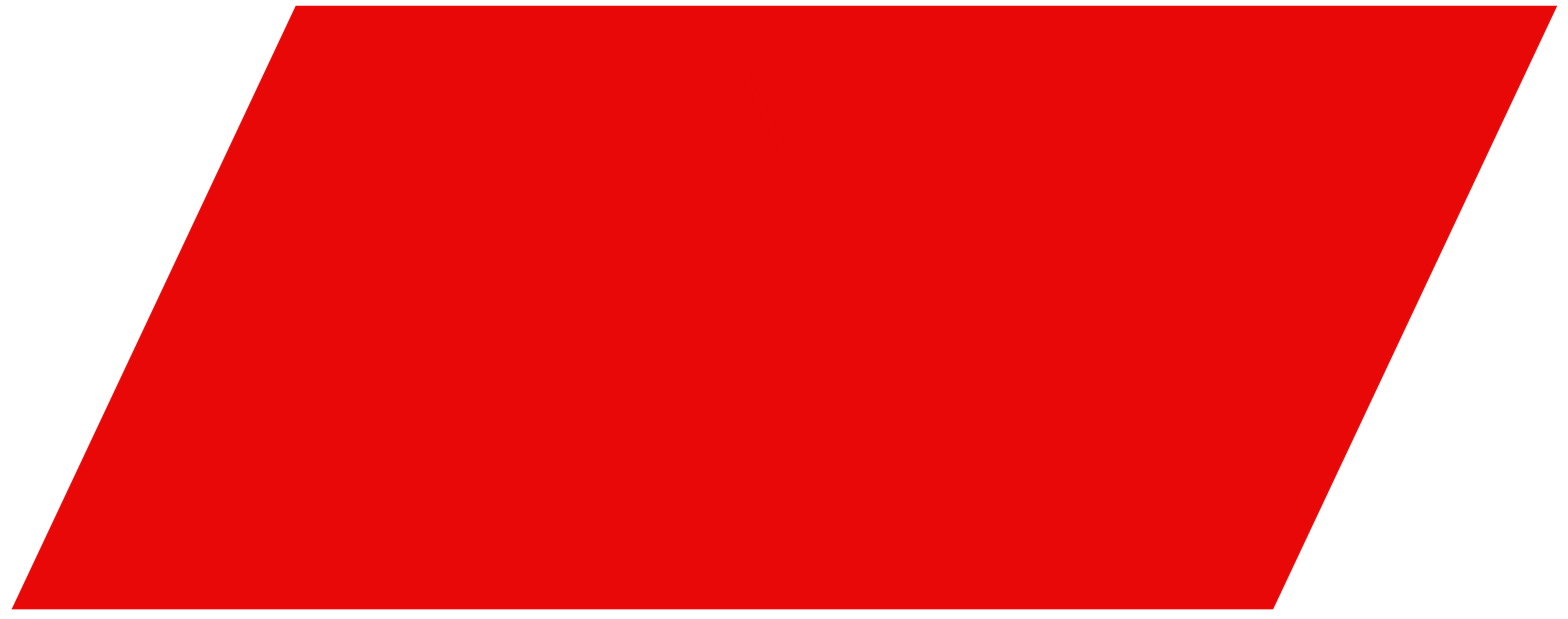
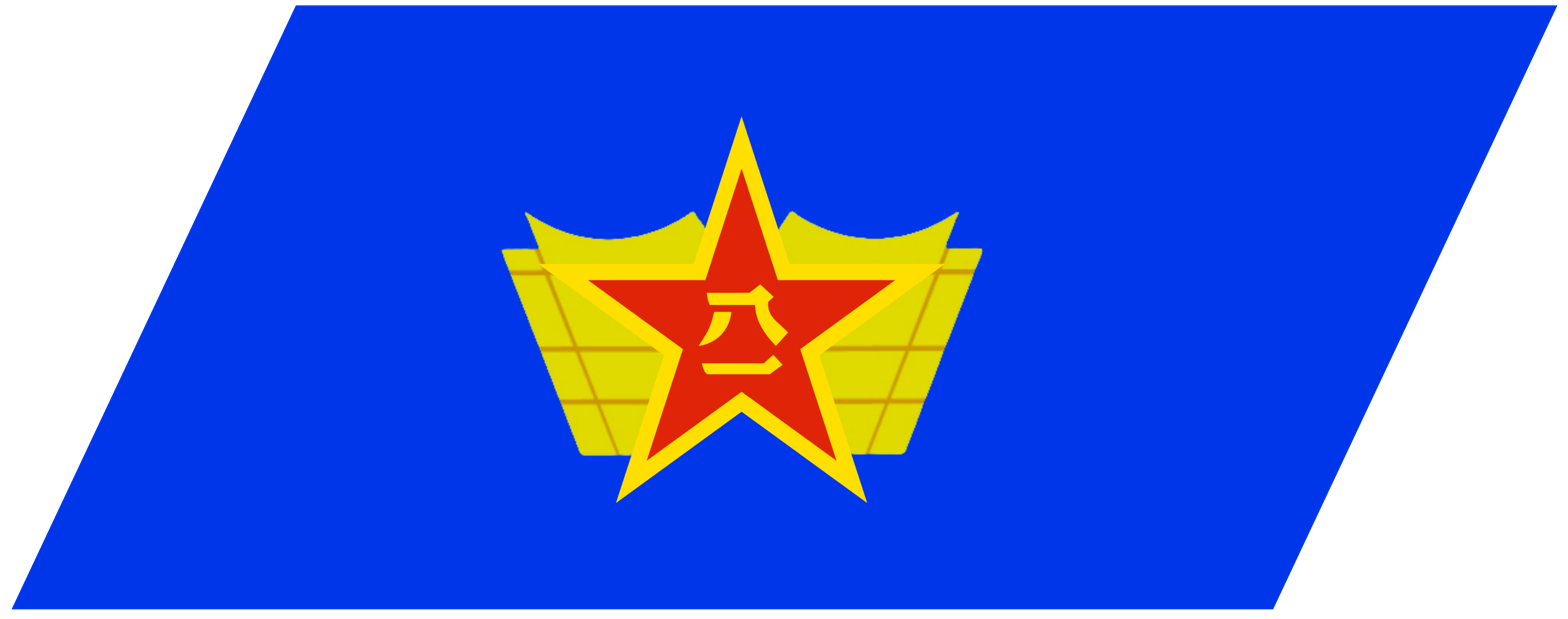
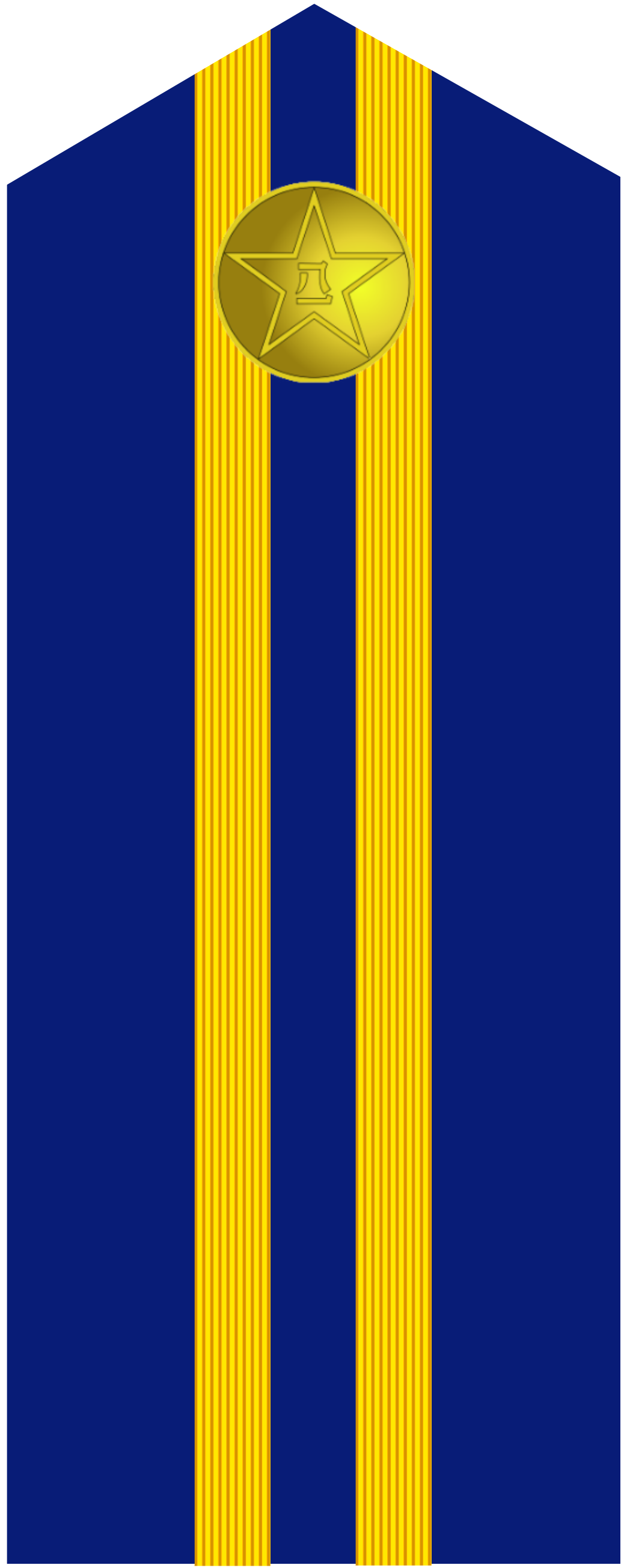
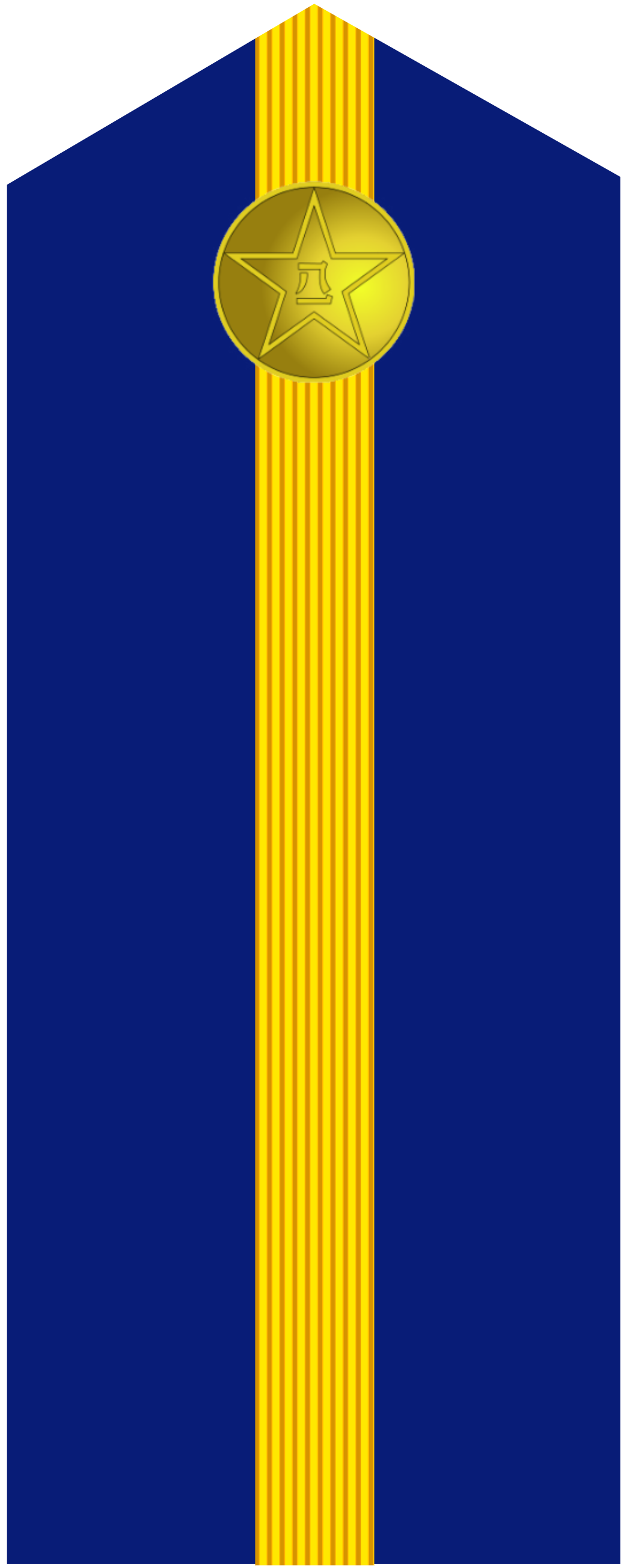
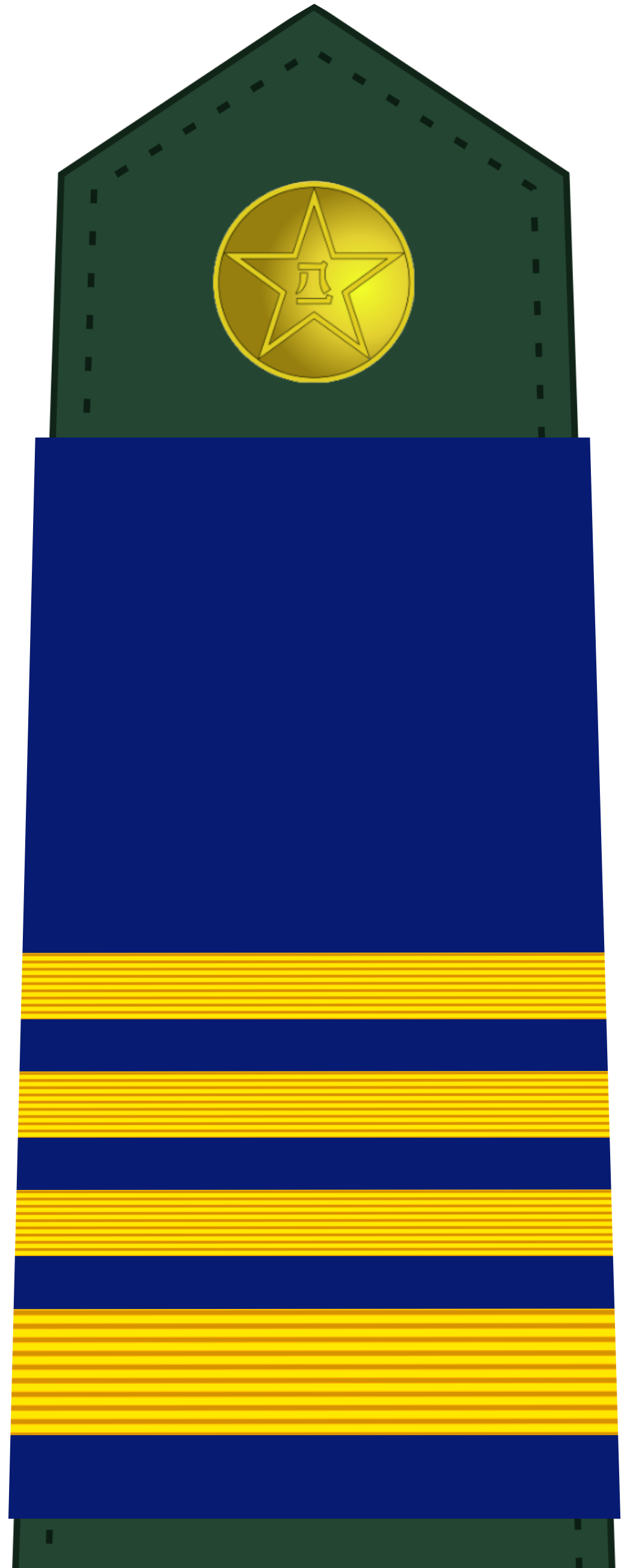
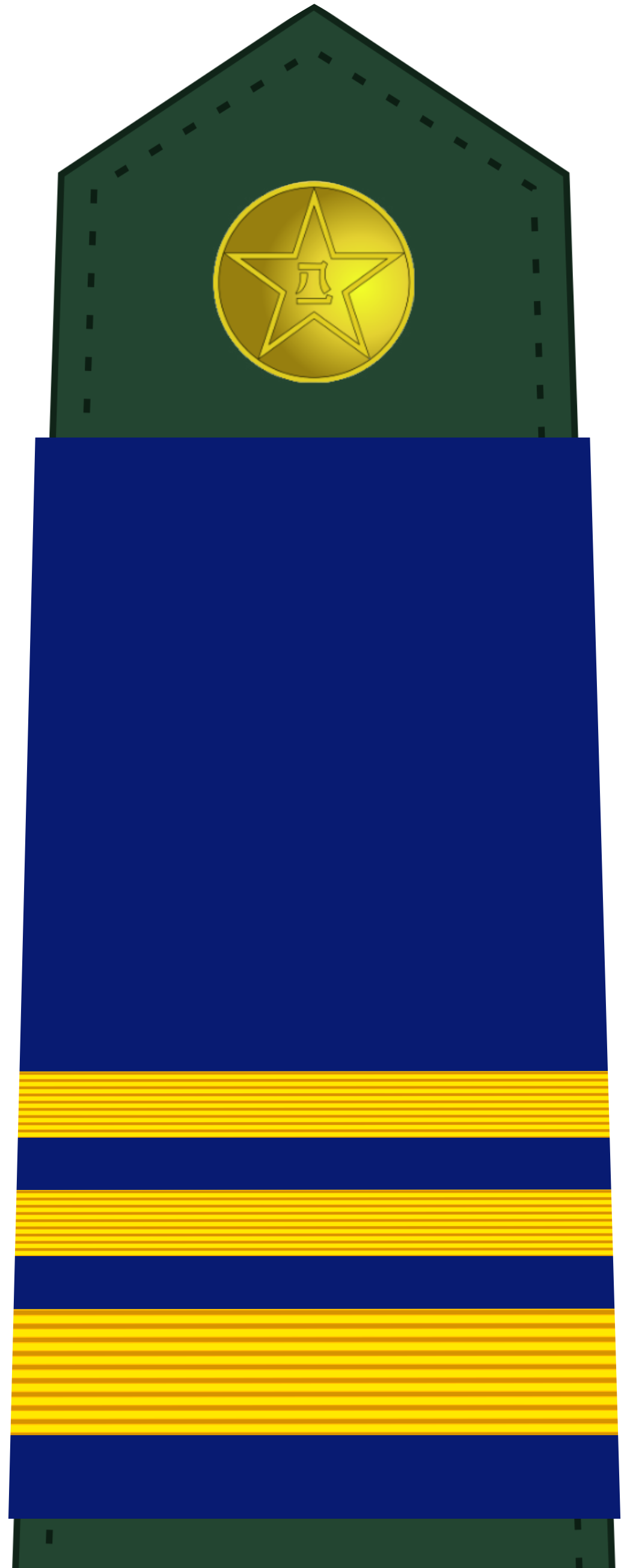
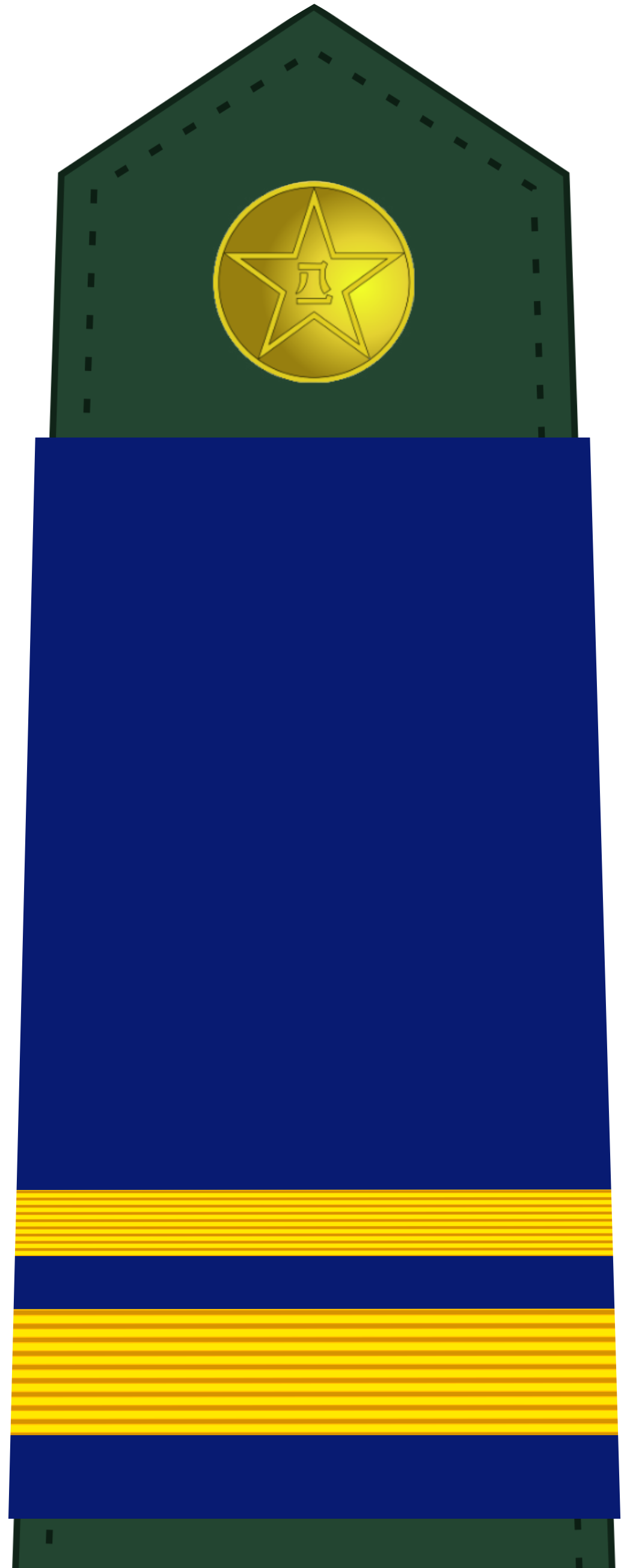
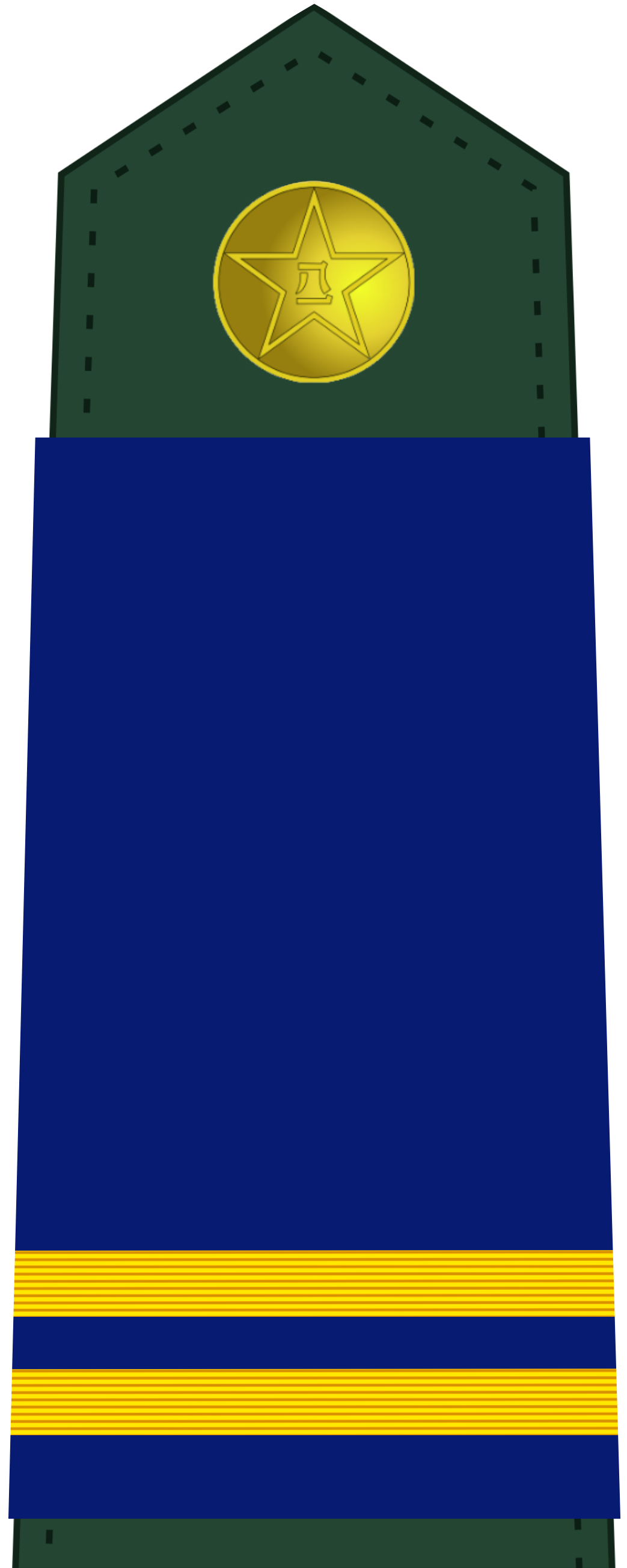
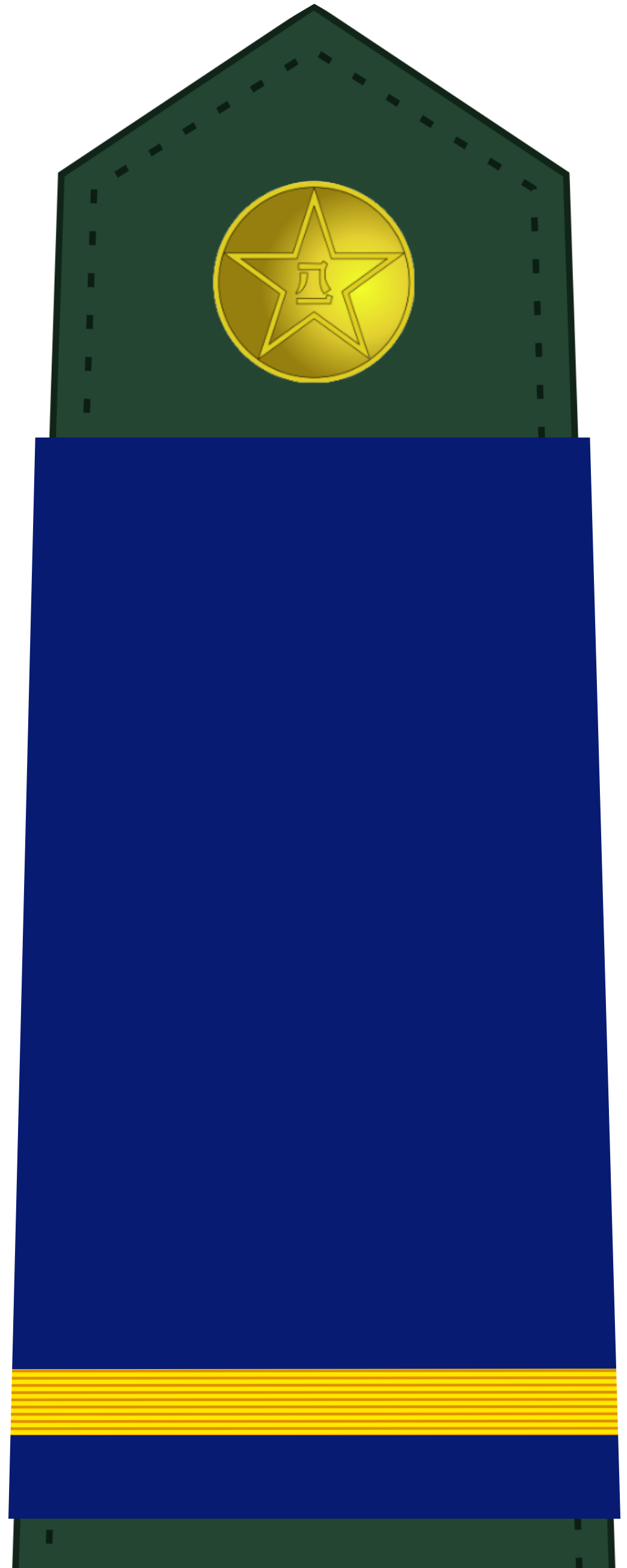
Rank group	Senior NCOs				Junior NCOs	Enlisted
PLA Air Force (1955–1965)
PLA Air Force (1955–1965)			上士; Shàng shì	中士; Zhōng shì	下士; Xià shì	上等兵; Shàngděngbīng	列兵; Lièbīng
No ranks (1965–1985)
No ranks (1985–1988)
PLA Air Force (1988–1994)
PLA Air Force (1988–1994)	军士长; Jūn shì zhǎng	专业军士; Zhuān yè jūn shì	上士; Shàng shì	中士; Zhōng shì	下士; Xià shì	上等兵; Shàngděngbīng	列兵; Lièbīng

== See also ==
- Grades of the armed forces of China
- People's Liberation Army rank insignia
- Republic of China Armed Forces rank insignia
